= Timeline of same-sex marriage =

This article contains a timeline of significant events regarding same-sex marriage and legal recognition of same-sex couples worldwide. It begins with the history of same-sex unions during ancient times, which consisted of unions ranging from informal and temporary relationships to highly ritualized unions, and continues to modern-day state-recognized same-sex marriage. Events concerning same-sex marriages becoming legal in a country or in a country's state are listed in bold.

== Summary ==
The summary table below lists in chronological order the sovereign states (United Nations member states plus Taiwan) that have legalized same-sex marriage. As of June 2026, 39 states have legalized same sex marriage.

Dates are when marriages between same-sex couples began to be officially certified. When distinguished, the initial date is the date of legalization in the first subnational jurisdiction (state, province or constituent country), and the second is the completion date for all jurisdictions, not counting external territories (or in the case of the US, sovereign tribal nations). A dash indicates that same-sex marriage is not (yet) legal in all jurisdictions. This is the case for the Kingdom of the Netherlands, where the constituent country Sint Maarten has not yet legalized, and for the Realm of New Zealand, where the constituent countries of Niue and the Cook Islands have not legalized.

Member state	First jurisdiction	National ruling or final jurisdiction
Netherlands	2001	—
Belgium	2003	
Canada	2003	2005
United States*	2004	2015
Spain	2005	
South Africa	2006	
Norway	2009	
Sweden	2009	
Mexico	2010	2022
Portugal	2010	
Iceland	2010	
Argentina	2010	
Brazil	2011	2013
Denmark	2012	2017
France	2013	
Uruguay	2013	
New Zealand*	2013	—
United Kingdom*	2014	2020
Luxembourg	2015	
Ireland	2015	
Colombia	2016	
Finland	2017	
Malta	2017	
Germany	2017	
Australia	2017	
Austria	2019	
Taiwan	2019	
Ecuador	2019	
Costa Rica	2020	
Chile	2022	
Switzerland	2022	
Slovenia	2022	
Cuba	2022	
Andorra	2023	
Estonia	2024	
Greece*	2024	
Liechtenstein	2025	
Thailand	2025	
Nepal	2026	

* State controls one or more territories where same-sex marriage is not performed or not recognized.

== Ancient history ==
Various types of same-sex marriages have existed, ranging from informal, unsanctioned relationships to highly ritualized unions.

Cicero mentions the marriage (using the Latin verb for "to marry", i.e. nubere) of the son of Curio the Elder, but he does it in a metaphorical form to criticize his enemy Antonius. Cicero states thus that the younger Curio was "united in a stable and permanent marriage" to Antonius. Martial also mentions a number of same-sex marriages, but always in derisory terms against people whom he wants to mock.

At least two of the Roman Emperors were in same-sex unions; and in fact, thirteen out of the first fourteen Roman Emperors held to be bisexual or exclusively homosexual. The first Roman emperor to have married a man was Nero, who is reported to have married two other men on different occasions. First with one of his freedmen, Pythagoras, to whom Nero took the role of the bride, and later as a groom Nero married a young boy, who resembled one of his concubines, named Sporus.

Adolescent emperor Elagabalus referred to his chariot driver, a blond slave from Caria named Hierocles, as his husband. He also married an athlete named Zoticus in a lavish public ceremony in Rome amidst the rejoicings of the citizens. In the Far East, same-sex marriage was recorded as normal and accepted by society in many of the native cultures of the Asia-Pacific region, such as Philippines.

The Siwa Oasis in Egypt had a historical acceptance of male homosexuality and even rituals of same-sex marriage—traditions that Egyptian authorities have sought to repress, with increasing success, since the early 20th century. The German egyptologist George Steindorff explored the oasis in 1900 and reported that homosexual relations were common and often extended to a form of marriage.

== Post-classical history ==
- 1590: The Boxer Codex records same-sex marriage as a normal occurrence in the Philippines for the indigenous population.
- 1781: Jens Andersson of Norway, assigned female at birth, but identifying as male, was imprisoned and put on trial after marrying Anne Kristine Mortensdotter in a Lutheran church. When asked about their gender, the response was "Hand troer at kunde henhøre til begge Deele" ("He believes he belongs to both").
- 1834: Anne Lister, dubbed "the first modern lesbian", married Ann Walker (landowner) at Holy Trinity Church, Goodramgate, York.

== 1900s ==
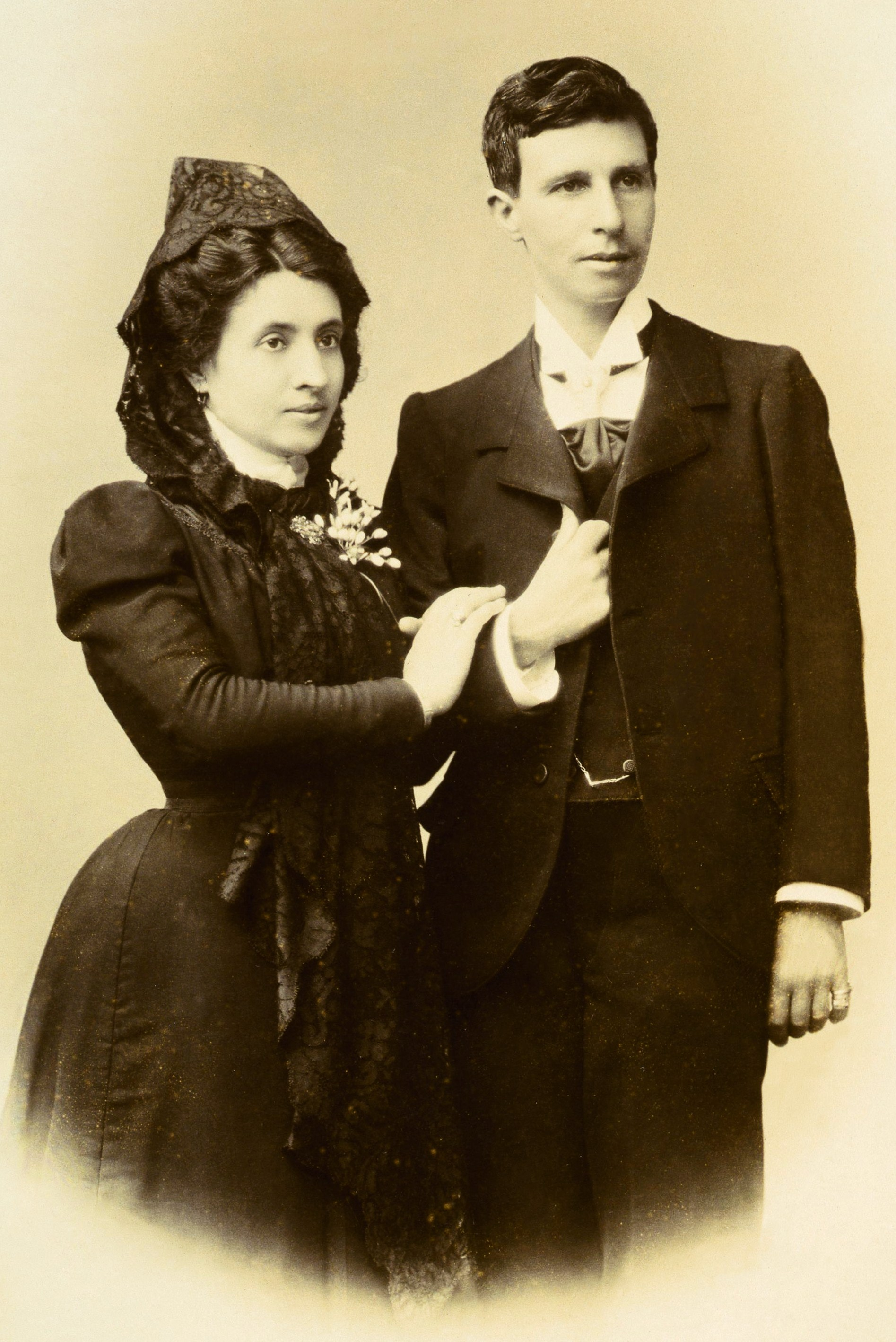
Marcela and Elisa after their wedding, photo by José Sellier

=== 1901 ===
- Two women named Marcela Gracia and Elisa Sánchez are able to get legally married in A Coruña, Spain. To achieve it, Elisa adopted a male identity under the name Mario Sánchez to marry Marcela and thus they were able to fool the authorities. The truth eventually broke out and their case appeared in many newspapers throughout Europe, so they had to escape to the Americas to avoid being arrested.

=== 1929 ===
- Following the decriminalisation of homosexuality in the Soviet Union, a conference on sexual and gender diversity organised by the People's Commissariat for Health adopts a resolution calling for same-sex marriage to be officially recognised with a requirement for approval from a psychiatrist. The resolution was not adopted into law and homosexuality was re-criminalised by the Soviet Union in 1933 under Joseph Stalin.

== 1960s ==
=== 1963 ===
- Swedish lesbian activist Vivi Astroy and her partner Märta organize a symbolic wedding ceremony with around 50 guests in one of the banquet halls of the Källaren Drufvan restaurant, in Stockholm. A gay friend of theirs officiated the wedding.

=== 1967 ===
- After living with each other for some years, a gay Brazilian couple from Cametá decided to formalize their union in a traditional religious ceremony. As same-sex marriage was illegal, one of them disguised as a woman, and with civil and ecclesiastical authorities unaware that they were two men, allowed the marriage. However, upon realizing it, they arrested the couple and church authorities ordered the annulment of the marriage.

== 1970s ==
=== 1970 ===
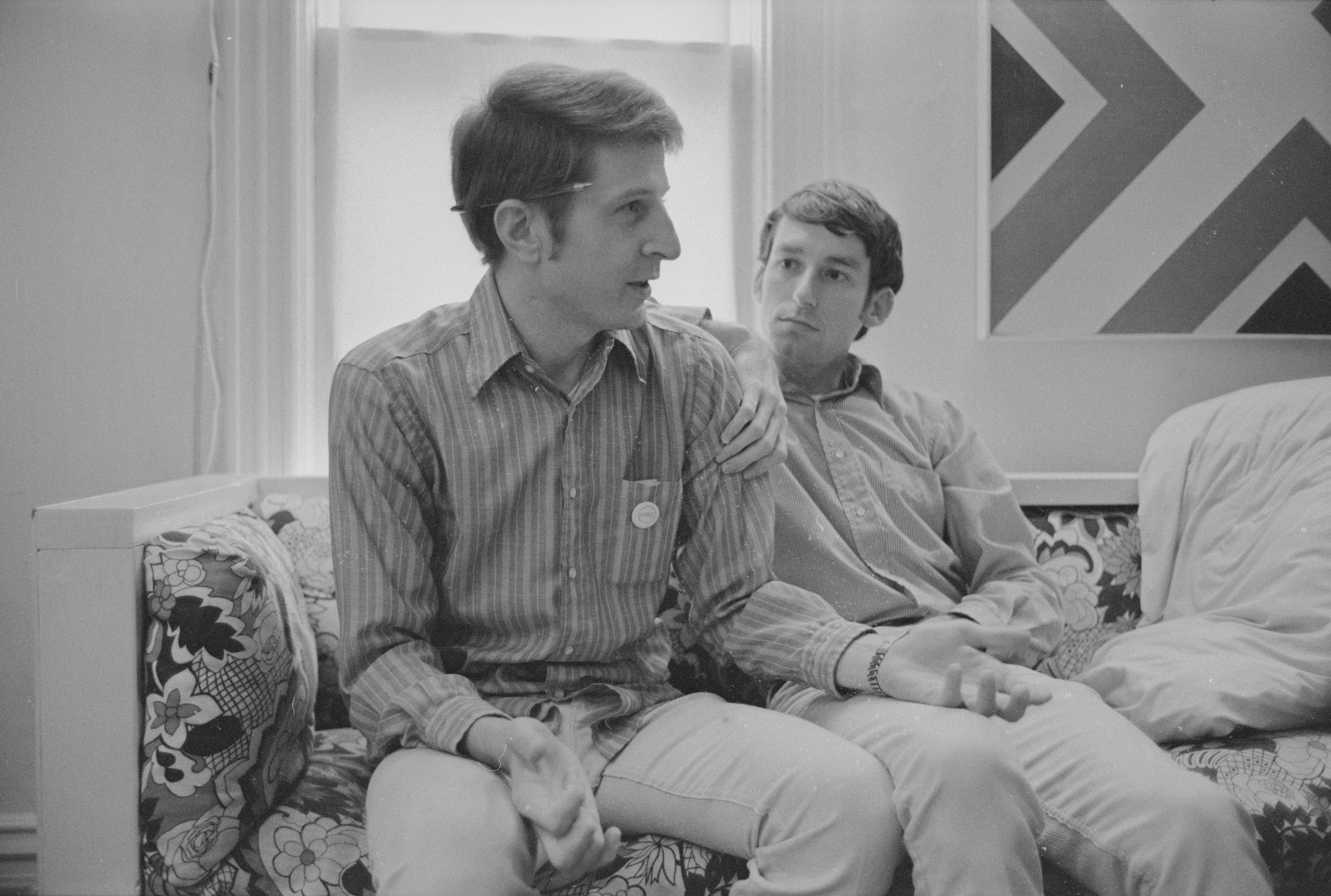
Jack Baker and Michael McConnell (r), 1970

- 18 May: Gay activists Jack Baker and Michael McConnell from the United States apply for a marriage license in Hennepin County, Minnesota, but are denied one by a clerk. Blue Earth County issues them a license in August 1971. Eventually, Assistant Chief Judge Gregory Anderson declares that marriage "to be in all respects valid", which made it the earliest legal same sex marriage "recorded" in the public files of any civil government.

=== 1971 ===
- 15 October: The Minnesota Supreme Court rules in Baker v. Nelson that the refusal by the clerk in Hennepin County to issue a marriage license to Jack Baker and Michael McConnell in 1970 did not violate the U.S. Constitution. The U.S. Supreme Court accepts their appeal but dismisses the action in 1972. Neither decision invalidates the license issued in Blue Earth County.

=== 1973 ===
- 1 January: Maryland becomes the first state in the U.S. to statutorily ban same-sex marriage. In the following two decades, other states joined Maryland in statutorily banning same-sex marriage, reaching almost the totality of US states by 1994.

=== 1974 ===
- 20 May: Singer v. Hara, a lawsuit filed by John F. Singer and Paul Barwick after being refused a request for a marriage license at the King County Administration Building in Seattle, Washington on 20 September 1971, ends with a unanimous rejection by the Washington State Court of Appeals.

=== 1975 ===
- April: Boulder County clerk Clela Rorex issued five same-sex marriage licenses. Boulder District Attorney deferred the licenses, which became void. The matter never reached the courts, and the six marriages were never invalidated.

=== 1979 ===
- June: The Netherlands adopts an "unregistered cohabitation" scheme as a civil status in rent law, becoming the first country in the world where same-sex couples could apply for limited rights.

== 1980s ==
=== 1984 ===
- 4 December: The Berkeley City Council passes a domestic partnership policy to offer insurance benefits to city employees in same-sex relationships, which made Berkeley the first city in the U.S. to do so.

=== 1985 ===
- 25 March: West Hollywood becomes the first US city to enact a domestic partnership registry open to all its citizens.

=== 1989 ===
- 27 August: Andrew Sullivan writes the first major article in the United States advocating for gay people to be given the right to marry, published in The New Republic.
- 1 October: Denmark becomes the first country in the world to legally recognise same-sex unions, after Margrethe II of Denmark gave royal assent to a bill legalising "registered partnerships" in a 71–47 vote.

== 1990s ==
=== 1993 ===
- 30 April: Norway approves a registered partnerships bill, becoming the second country in the world (after Denmark) to provide legal recognition for same-sex couples. It came into effect on 1 August.
- 5 May: The Supreme Court of the U.S. state of Hawaii rules in Baehr v. Lewin that the state's law limiting marriage to opposite-sex couples is presumed to be unconstitutional unless the state can present a "compelling interest" justifying the same-sex marriage ban.

=== 1994 ===
- 23 June: The Parliament of Sweden approves a registered partnerships bill in a 171–141 vote. It became legal on 1 January 1995.

=== 1995 ===
- 12 March: One recorded case of a legally valid same-sex civil marriage contraction in Cambodia: Khav Sokha and Pum Eth were married in the village of Kro Bao Ach Kok, in Kandal Province

=== 1996 ===
- 26 April: Greenland adopts Denmark's registered partnership law.
- 4 June: The Parliament of Iceland legalizes registered partnerships in a 44–1 vote.
- 21 September: As a direct result of the Baehr v. Lewin ruling of 1993, President Bill Clinton of the United States signs the Defense of Marriage Act (DOMA) into law, which banned the federal Government from recognizing same-sex unions.
- 12 November: Local politician Lonnie Rich proposed the legalization of same-sex marriage before the Alexandria, VA City Council. His proposal was not passed, but was an early example of a heterosexual politician showing support for same-sex marriages.

=== 1997 ===
- 5 July: The Netherlands passes a registered partnerships bill. It became law on 1 January 1998.
- U.S. state of Hawaii passes a law to establish Reciprocal beneficiary relationships, which made Hawaii the first state in the country to offer statewide recognition for same-sex couples. The law came into force on 1 July of the same year.

=== 1998 ===
- 30 June: Catalonia becomes the first region of the world to legalize civil unions for same-sex couples.
- 3 November: Hawaii and Alaska become the first U.S. states to pass constitutional amendments against same-sex marriage. Other U.S. states followed suit and passed similar amendments in the following years, reaching a peak of 31 in 2012. For more information, refer to U.S. state constitutional amendments banning same-sex unions.

=== 1999 ===
- 12 January: Belgium approves a registered partnerships bill. It became law on 1 January 2000.
- March: Spanish region of Aragon legalizes civil unions.
- 22 September: Governor Gray Davis from the U.S. state of California signs a domestic partnerships bill into law that provided limited rights for same-sex couples, which made California the first state in the country to have a statewide domestic partnership scheme and the second to provide a registry for same-sex couples after Hawaii.
- 15 November: The Parliament of France approves legislation (art. 515-1 et s. Code civil) that:

1. creates a relationship register for both gay and straight couples (called "Pacte civil de solidarité" abbreviated as "PaCS"); and
2. redefines the non-registered partnership as the stable union between two adults regardless of their gender (before this law, previous decisions of the French highest Court ruled that there could be no couple without appearance of marriage, therefore excluding gay people from any vision of family).

- 20 December: The Supreme Court of the U.S. state of Vermont holds in Baker v. Vermont that excluding same-sex couples from marriage violates the Vermont Constitution and orders the legislature to establish same-sex marriage or an equivalent status.

== 2000s ==
=== 2000 ===
- 26 April: Governor Howard Dean from the U.S. state of Vermont signs a civil unions bill in response to the ruling of Baker v. Vermont, thus making Vermont the first state in the U.S. to give civil union rights to same-sex couples. It became law on 1 July.
- 23 June: Spanish region of Navarra legalizes same-sex civil unions. It also legalized joint adoption for same-sex couples, a first for the country.
- November: Germany approves a bill to legalize "Life partnerships". It became law on 1 August 2001.
- 21 December: Queen Beatrix of the Netherlands signs into law the first same-sex marriage bill in the world. It had previously cleared the country's Senate on 19 December in a 49–26 vote and the House of Representatives on 12 September in a 109–33 vote. The law came into effect on 1 April 2001.

=== 2001 ===
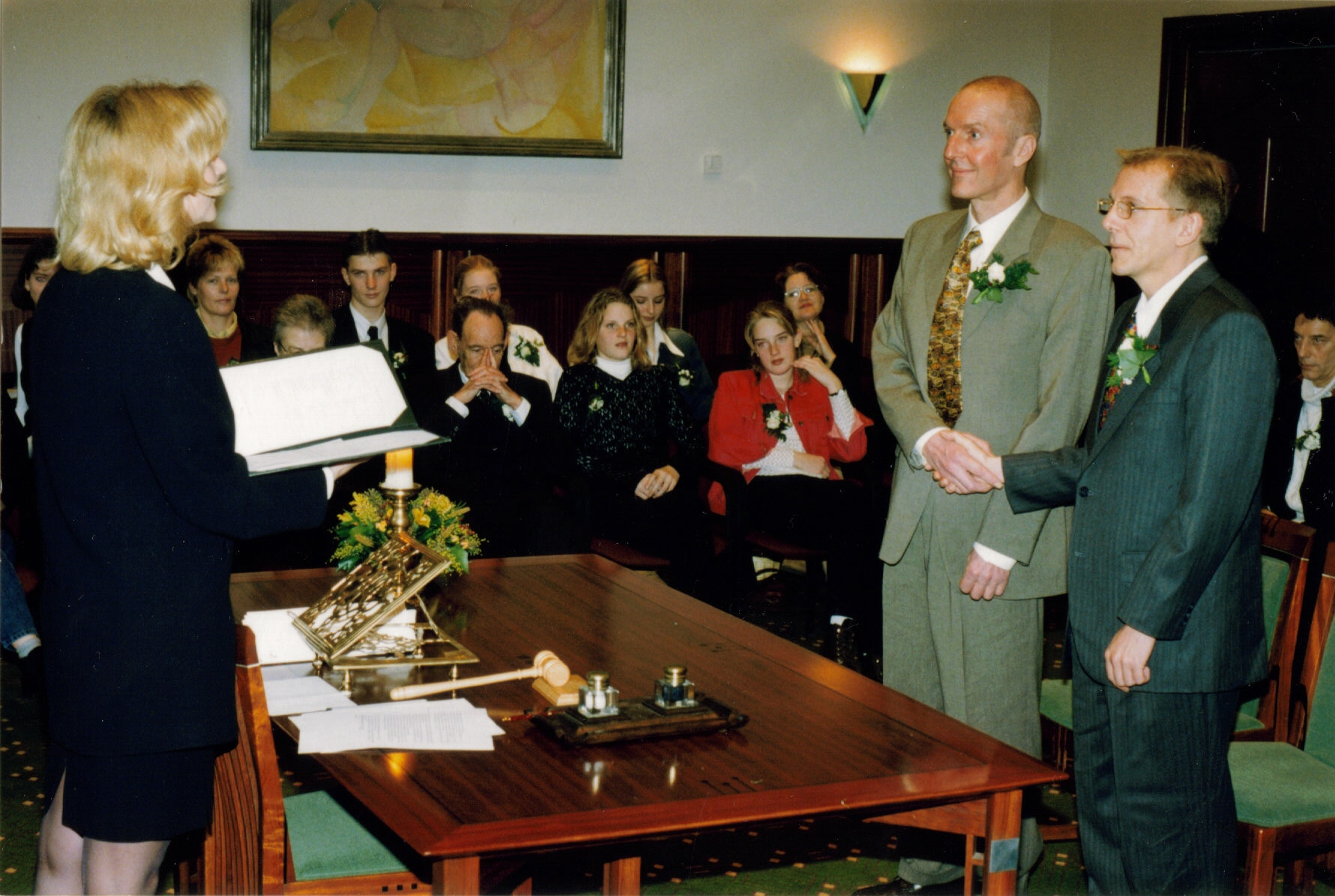
Two men marrying in Amsterdam, after Queen Beatrix signed the law to make Netherlands the first country in the world to legalize same-sex marriage (2001)

- 14 January: Two same-sex marriages are performed at the Metropolitan Community Church of Toronto in Ontario, Canada. Although registration of the marriages was initially denied, a successful court challenge upheld their legality on 10 June 2003, thus retroactively making them the first legal same-sex marriages in modern times.
- Netherlands (1 April): **Laws that permit marriage for same-sex couples and grant same-sex couples adoption rights in the Netherlands come into effect.** Four same-sex couples are married at the stroke of midnight by the Mayor of Amsterdam.
- 28 September: The Parliament of Finland approves a Registered Partnerships bill in a 99–84 vote. The law came into effect on 1 March 2002.
- 11 December: Spanish region of the Balearic Islands legalizes same-sex civil unions.
- 13 December: The Community of Madrid, location of the capital of Spain, legalizes same-sex civil unions.

=== 2002 ===
- June: the National Assembly of Quebec passed the Act Instituting Civil Unions and Establishing New Rules of Filiation. This created civil unions, which allow both same-sex and opposite-sex couples to make a public commitment to live together and comply with the resulting rights and obligations.
- 27 November: Spanish region of Andalucia legalizes same-sex civil unions.
- 12 December: A bill was passed to make civil unions legal in the Autonomous City of Buenos Aires, Argentina, making it the first jurisdiction in Latin America to legally recognize same-sex unions.

=== 2003 ===
- Belgium (13 February): **King Albert II of Belgium signs a bill legalizing same-sex marriage into law, making Belgium the second country in the world to legalize civil marriage for same-sex couples**, after the Netherlands. The bill previously passed the Chamber of Representatives in a 91–22 vote on 30 January 2003 and the Senate in a 46–15 vote on 13 December 2002. It came into effect on 1 June.
- 1 May: The British Columbia Court of Appeal becomes the first provincial court of appeal to rule that the Canadian government must legally recognize same-sex marriage.
- Ontario (10 June): **A court of appeals in Canada legalizes same-sex marriage in the province**, ruling that restricting marriage to heterosexual couples contravened the equality provisions in the Canadian Charter of Rights and Freedoms. This makes Ontario the second jurisdiction in the Americas to legalize same-sex marriages.
- 17 September: A registered partnership bill receives Royal Assent in Tasmania, Australia. It was previously approved by the state Legislative Council on 27 August and by the state House of Assembly on 25 June. It came into effect on 1 January 2004.
- 18 November: The Supreme Judicial Court of the U.S. state of Massachusetts rules in Goodridge v. Department of Public Health that same-sex couples have the right to be married and that marriage licenses must be issued beginning 17 May 2004, allowing the legislature six months to modify state law if it chooses to.

=== 2004 ===
- 12 January: The legislature of the U.S. state of New Jersey passes a registered partnerships bill. It came into effect on 10 July.
- February–March: A number of jurisdictions in the U.S. begin issuing marriage licenses to same-sex couples, including San Francisco, California (12 February), Sandoval County, New Mexico (20 February), New Paltz, New York (27 February), Multnomah County, Oregon (3 March) and Asbury Park, New Jersey (9 March). Many of the licenses were later nullified; not necessarily in those issued in Sandoval County, New Mexico.
- April: The U.S. state of Maine adopts a registered partnerships bill. The law comes into effect on 30 July.
- 12 May: The parliament of Luxembourg approves a civil partnerships bill. It came into effect on 1 November.
- 17 May: Same-sex marriage becomes legal in the U.S. state of Massachusetts after the Legislature failed to take any action in the 180 days period given by the state's Supreme Court. It becomes the first U.S. state to legalize same-sex marriage.
- 5 November: A judge in Saskatchewan, Canada, rules that same-sex couples must enjoy the right to equal marriage in that province.
- 17 November: The United Kingdom's parliament legalizes civil partnerships for same-sex couples. The bill receives royal assent the next day, and takes effect on 5 December 2005.
- 30 November: The Supreme Court of Appeal of South Africa rules that the common law concept of marriage must be extended to include same-sex couples.
- 8 December: The government of Israel indicates that it will recognize same-sex partnerships for certain benefits.
- 8 December: The parliament of New Zealand approves a civil unions law by a vote of 65 to 55. The bill comes into effect on 26 April 2005.

=== 2005 ===
- 23 March: The Principality of Andorra legalizes same-sex unions.
- 20 April: Governor Jodi Rell from the U.S. State of Connecticut signs a same-sex civil unions bill into law after passing the State Senate 26 to 8 earlier that day. The bill was previously approved on 13 April by the State House of Representatives in an 85–63 vote. It came into effect on 1 October.
- 5 June: A registered partnership law is approved in Switzerland by 58 percent of voters after opponents organized a ballot measure. It came into effect on 1 January 2007.
- 22 June: A registered partnerships bill is approved in Slovenia giving same-sex couples limited rights. It came into effect on 23 July 2006.
- 23 June: A judge in New Brunswick, Canada, rules that same-sex couples have the right to equal marriage in that province.
- Spain (30 June): **The Congress of Deputies of Spain passes a same-sex marriage bill for a second time, overruling the rejection of the Spanish Senate a week before. This makes Spain the third country in the world to legalize same-sex marriage.** The law took effect on 3 July, after it was publicized in the official government registry. King Juan Carlos I granted the law Royal Assent the day after passage.
- Canada (19 July): **The Parliament of Canada legalizes same-sex marriage, making Canada the first country in the Americas to legalize same-sex marriage and the fourth in the world to do so.** It became law on 20 July after receiving Royal Assent. Eight of ten provinces and one of three territories in Canada already allowed same-sex marriage before being recognized federally.
- 1 December: In the case of Minister of Home Affairs v Fourie, the Constitutional Court of South Africa unanimously finds the restriction of marriage to opposite-sex couples to be unconstitutional, giving the country's Parliament one year to introduce same-sex marriage.

=== 2006 ===
- 15 March: The Czech Republic's parliament passes a registered partnership law with 101 votes (out of 177) overriding President Václav Klaus, who previously vetoed the law on 16 February after it was approved by the lower and upper house in 2005. The law came into effect on 1 July.
- 18 May: King Albert II of Belgium signs a bill allowing adoption by same-sex couples into law after it was approved by the country's Senate on 20 April in a 34–33 vote.
- 25 October: The Supreme Court of the U.S. state of New Jersey unanimously rules in favor of same-sex marriage; 4–3 give the legislature six months to legalize same-sex marriage or civil unions. The three dissenting justices dissented because they believed same-sex couples should have the full right to marry.
- 9 November: The Legislative Assembly of Mexico City passes a civil union law.
- 21 November: Israel's supreme court rules that same-sex marriages performed abroad will be formally registered by the Israeli Interior Ministry. This ruling makes equal the status of same-sex couples and other Israeli couples who cannot be married by the formal religious institutions in Israel (e.g. couples from different religions).
- South Africa (29 November): **Deputy President Phumzile Mlambo-Ngcuka of South Africa signs the Civil Union Act into law, making South Africa the first African country to legalise same-sex marriage.** The bill was passed by the National Assembly in a 229–41 vote on 14 November, and 36–11 by the National Council of Provinces on 28 November. The first wedding took place on 1 December.
- 7 December: The Parliament of Canada rejects Prime Minister Stephen Harper's motion to re-open the equal marriage debate. The motion was defeated 175–123, and every political party had more MPs supporting same-sex marriage than in the previous vote. The prime minister declared the issue "settled".
- 21 December: Governor Jon Corzine from the U.S. state of New Jersey signs a bill legalizing civil unions into law. It took effect on 19 February 2007.

=== 2007 ===
- 12 January: The Mexican state of Coahuila legalizes civil unions, being the first state to do so in Mexico and the second entity (after Mexico D.F.).
- 21 April: Governor Christine Gregoire from the U.S. state of Washington signs a domestic partnerships bill into law. It came into effect on 22 July.
- 9 May: Governor Ted Kulongoski from the U.S. state of Oregon signs a domestic partnerships bill into law. It came into effect on 1 February 2008.
- 31 May: Governor John Lynch from the U.S. state of New Hampshire signs a civil unions bill into law. It came into effect on 1 January 2008.
- 30 August: A court of the U.S. state of Iowa strikes down its ban on same-sex marriage as a result of a legal challenge. About 20 couples obtained marriage licenses and one couple married before the judge issued a stay of his ruling pending appeal.
- Uruguay (27 December): **President Tabaré Vázquez of Uruguay signs a civil unions bill into law, becoming the first country in Latin America to approve a law giving legal recognition to same-sex couples.** The bill was previously approved by the country's legislature on 19 December. It came into effect on 1 January 2008.

=== 2008 ===
- 15 April: A bill legalizing registered relationships receives Royal Assent in Victoria, Australia. It was previously approved by the State Legislative Council on 10 April and by the State Legislative Assembly on 12 March. The law came into effect on 1 December.
- 8 May: The Legislative Assembly of the ACT, Australia, passes a bill legalizing civil partnerships for same-sex couples. It came into effect on 19 May.

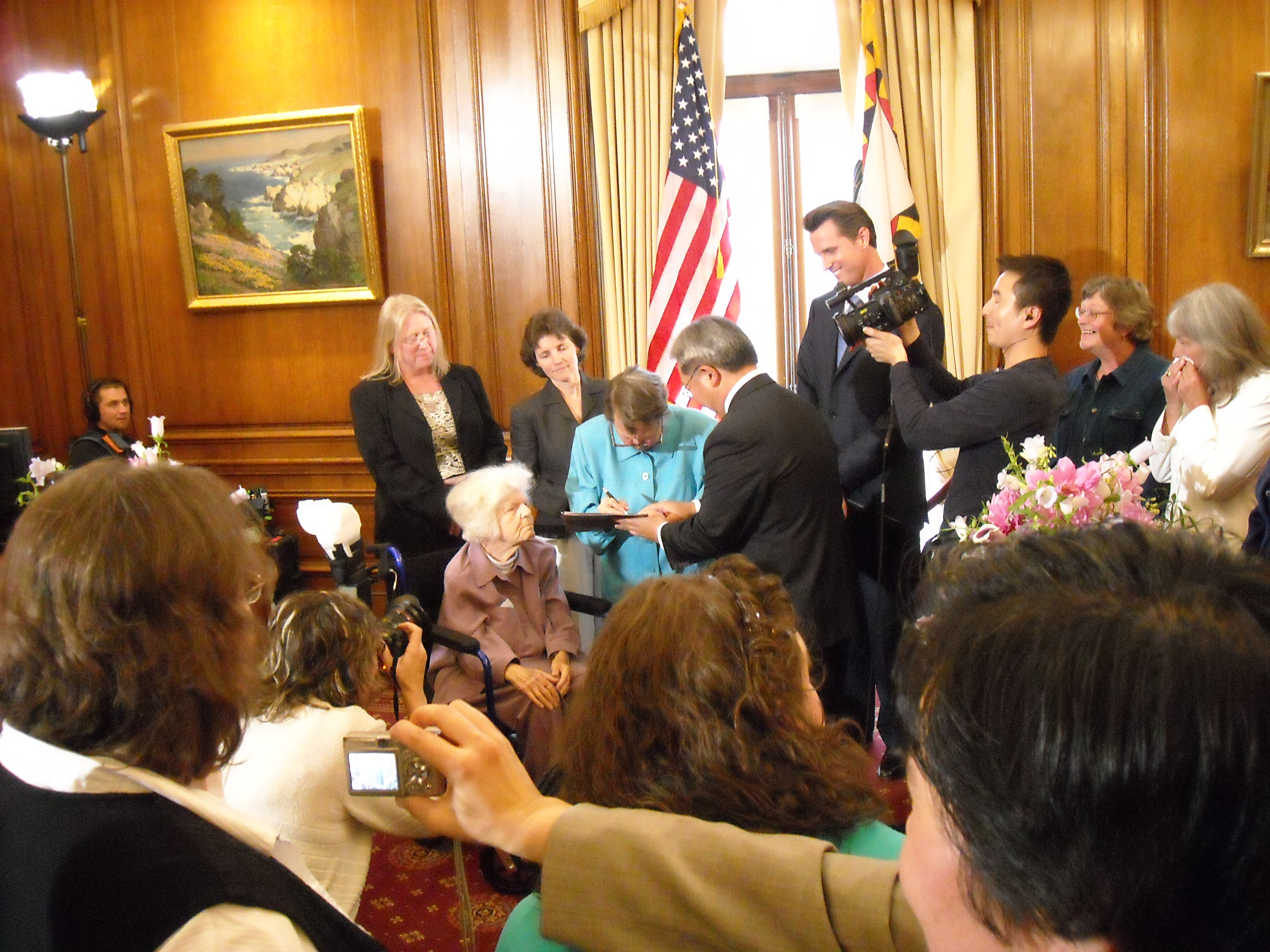
The first same-sex wedding in San Francisco, California, with legal recognition by the state, with Mayor Gavin Newsom officiating (16 June 2008)

- California (15 May): **The Supreme Court of the U.S. state of California legalizes same-sex marriage** in the landmark In re Marriage Cases ruling. The ruling took effect on 16 June.
- 22 May: Governor Martin O'Malley of the U.S. state of Maryland signs into law two bills legalizing domestic partnerships. They came into effect on 1 July.
- Norway (17 June): **Norway's upper house legalizes same-sex marriage in a 23–17 vote.** The bill was previously approved by the lower house on 11 June in an 84–41 vote. It came into effect on 1 January 2009.
- 28 September: Ecuador's new Constitution is approved by 63.9% of voters, legalizing civil unions for same-sex couples. The country's first same-sex civil union was performed on 12 August 2009.
- Connecticut (10 October): **The Supreme Court of the U.S. state of Connecticut legalizes same-sex marriage** in the landmark Kerrigan and Mock v. Connecticut Department of Public Health ruling. Same-sex weddings started on 12 November.
- 4 November: A referendum seeking to constitutionally ban same-sex marriages in the U.S. state of California is approved by 52.2% of voters; thus **overturning same-sex marriage in California**, this event being noteworthy because it was the first time in modern history that same-sex marriage has been overturned.

=== 2009 ===
- 28 January: The Constitutional Court of Colombia rules that same-sex couples are entitled to the same rights as heterosexual couples in common-law marriages. The ruling means that civil and political rights such as nationality, residency, housing protection, and state benefits are now granted to same-sex partners.
- Sweden (1 April): **The Parliament of Sweden legalizes same-sex marriage in a 226–22 vote.** The law came into effect on 1 May.
- Iowa (3 April): **The Supreme Court of the U.S. state of Iowa unanimously votes to legalize same-sex marriage** in the landmark Varnum v. Brien ruling. Same-sex weddings started on 27 April.
- Vermont (7 April): **The U.S. state of Vermont legalizes same-sex marriage after a 23–5 vote in the State Senate and a 100–49 vote in the House of Representatives**, overriding Governor Jim Douglas, who had vetoed the law a day earlier, thus making Vermont the first U.S. state to legalize same-sex marriage through statute, rather than court decisions. The bill came into effect on 1 September.
- 20 April: The Parliament of Hungary legalizes registered partnerships in a 199–159 vote. The law came into effect on 1 July.
- 6 May: Governor John Baldacci from the U.S. state of Maine signs a same-sex marriage bill into law. The bill was previously approved 89–58 by the House of Representatives a day earlier and 21–14 by the State Senate on 30 April. However, opponents organized a referendum that overturned the law on 3 November.
- 18 May: Governor Chris Gregoire from the U.S. state of Washington signs the so-called "everything-but-marriage" registered partnerships bill into law. It was passed by the State Senate on 10 March and by the House of Representatives on 15 April. Opponents organized a referendum that failed to overturn it on 3 November. The law took effect on 3 December.
- 26 May: California Supreme Court upholds Proposition 8, constitutionally banning same-sex marriage, but rules that previously officiated same-sex marriages shall remain valid.
- 31 May: The Assembly of the U.S. state of Nevada legalizes domestic partnerships by a 28–14 vote, overriding a veto from Governor Jim Gibbons after the Senate did the same on 30 May by a 14–7 vote. The law came into effect on 1 October.
- New Hampshire (3 June): **Governor John Lynch from the U.S. State of New Hampshire signs a bill legalizing same-sex marriage into law** after being approved 14–10 by the State Senate and 198–176 by the House of Representatives. The law took effect on 1 January 2010.
- 29 June: Governor Jim Doyle from the U.S. state of Wisconsin signs into law a bill legalizing registered partnerships. The bill was previously approved by the State Assembly in a 50–48 vote on 13 June and by the State Senate in a 17–16 vote on 17 June. The law came into effect on 3 August.
- District of Columbia (18 December): **District of Columbia Mayor Adrian Fenty signs a same-sex marriage bill into law**. The bill was previously approved by the D.C. Council on 15 December. It came into effect on 3 March 2010.
- 18 December: The Federal Council (upper house) of Austria's passes a bill legalizing registered partnerships in a 44–8 vote. The bill was previously passed by the National Council (lower house) on 10 December in a 110–64 vote. It came into effect on 1 January 2010.
- 28 December: The first same-sex marriage in Argentina and Latin America is conducted in Ushuaia, province of Tierra del Fuego. The couple first planned to marry in Buenos Aires on 1 December after a city court ruled that it should be issued a marriage license; however, a national judge blocked the marriage from taking place in Buenos Aires. The couple successfully married in Ushuaia thanks to Governor Fabiana Ríos's intervention.
- Mexico City (29 December): **Mexico City's Head of Government Marcelo Ebrard signs a same-sex marriage bill into law.** The bill was previously approved on 21 December by the Legislative Assembly in a 39–20 vote. It took effect on 3 March 2010. Civil unions in Mexico City had been available since 2007, but full marriage was not yet recognized.

== 2010s ==
=== 2010 ===
- Portugal (17 May): **President of Portugal Aníbal Cavaco Silva signs a same-sex marriage bill into law**, making Portugal the sixth country in Europe, and eighth country overall, to legalize same-sex marriages. The country's Assembly previously approved the bill in its second reading on 11 February. It took effect on 5 June.
- 19 May: A registered partnerships bill receives Royal Assent in New South Wales, Australia. The bill was previously approved by the state upper House on 12 May in a 32–5 vote and by the state lower House on 11 May in a 62–9 vote. The law came into effect on 1 July.
- Iceland (11 June): **The Parliament of Iceland unanimously approves a law legalizing same-sex marriage by a vote of 49–0.** The law took effect on 27 June.
- 27 June: Jóhanna Sigurðardóttir, Iceland's Prime minister, becomes the world's first head of government to enter a same-sex marriage.
- 19 July: President Mary McAleese of Ireland signs into law a bill legalizing Civil Partnerships. It was previously passed by the Seanad in a 48–4 vote on 8 July. The law came into effect on 1 January 2011.

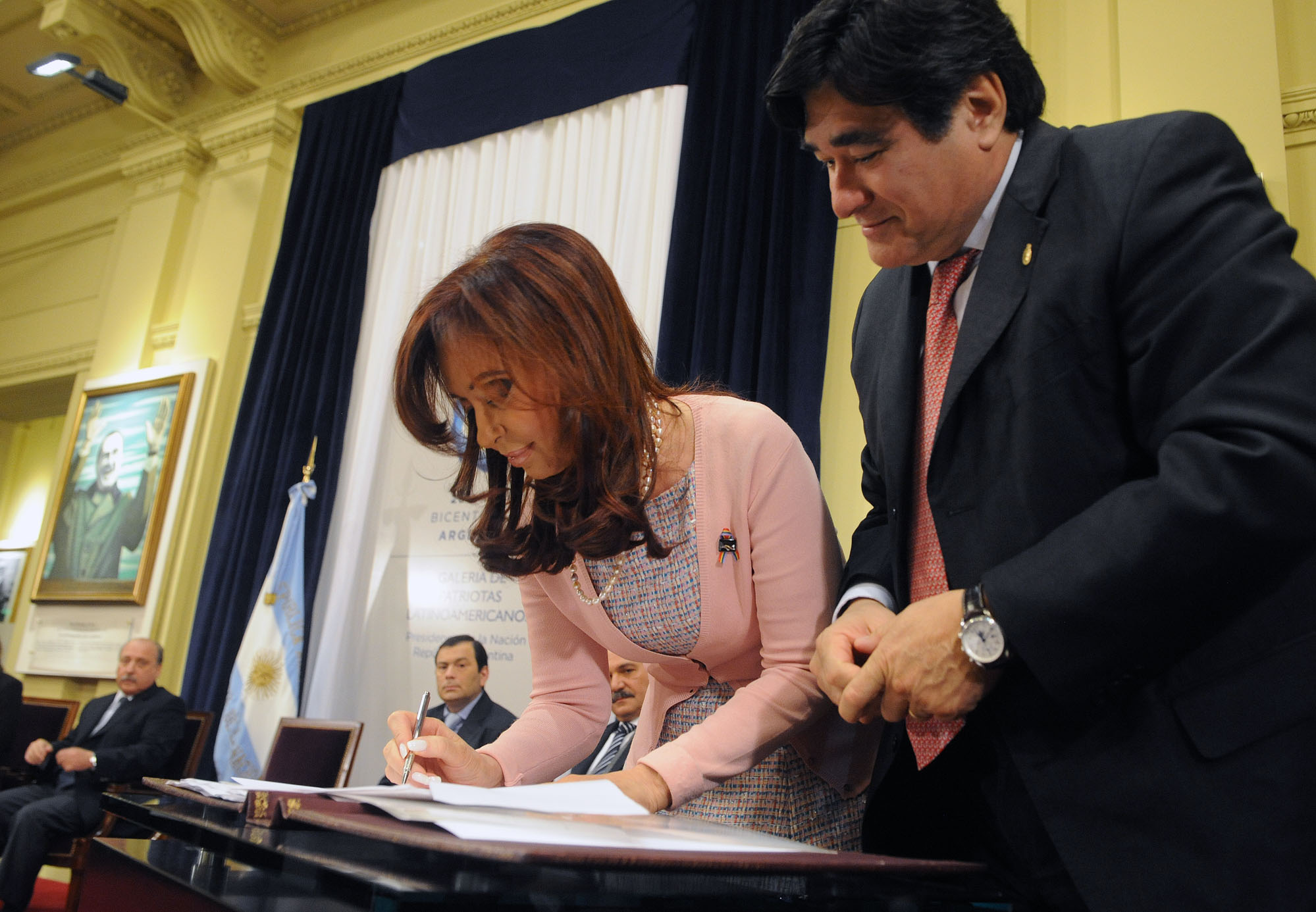
President of Argentina, Cristina Fernández, signs the bill legalizing same-sex marriage.

- Argentina (21 July): **President Cristina Fernandez of Argentina signs a same-sex marriage bill into law, making Argentina the first country in both South America and Latin America, and the second country in the Americas, to legalize same-sex marriage nationwide**. The bill was previously approved by the country's Senate 33–27 on 15 July and 125–109 by the Chamber of Deputies on 5 May. The first marriage took place on 30 July.
- 4 August: U.S. District Court of Northern California declares that Proposition 8, a 2008 California-electorate ban on same-sex marriage, violates due process and equal protection clauses in the U.S. Constitution. Supporters of the proposition eventually appealed all the way to the Supreme Court, which issued a ruling in 2013.
- 5 August: The Supreme Court of Mexico votes 8–2 to uphold the constitutionality of Mexico City's same-sex marriage law. On the following days, it also votes to mandate that all 31 states of Mexico must recognize same-sex marriages performed in other jurisdictions (on 10 August, on a 9–2 vote) and to uphold a Mexico City law permitting same-sex couples entering into marriages to adopt children (on 16 August, on a 9–2 vote).
- 10 August: The Supreme Court of Costa Rica issues a 5–2 ruling to halt a referendum on same-sex civil unions which was scheduled for 5 December after stating that minority rights should not be decided by the majority.

=== 2011 ===
- 10 January: The Court of Appeal of the province of Saskatchewan in Canada rules that marriage commissioners cannot refuse to wed same-sex couples on religious grounds.
- 31 January: Governor Pat Quinn from the US state of Illinois signs a civil unions bill into law. The bill was previously approved 32–24 by the state Senate on 1 December and 61–52 by the state House of Representatives on 30 November. It came into effect on 1 June.
- 23 February: Governor Neil Abercrombie from the US state of Hawaii signs a civil unions bill into law. The bill was previously approved 18–5 by the state Senate on 16 February and 31–19 by the state House of Representatives on 11 February. It came into effect on 1 January 2012.
- 15 March: The Isle of Man legalizes civil partnerships. The law came into effect on 6 April.
- 16 March: The Parliament of Liechtenstein passes a registered partnerships bill in a 24–0 vote. However, opponents organized a referendum that took place on 19 June.
- 5 May: The Supreme Federal Court of Brazil unanimously legalizes civil unions for same-sex couples.
- 11 May: Governor Jack Markell from the US state of Delaware signs a civil unions bill into law. The bill was previously approved 26–15 by the state House of Representatives on 14 April and 13–6 by the state Senate on 7 April. It came into effect on 1 January 2012.
- 19 June: Voters of Liechtenstein approve a registered partnerships bill by 68.8% after opponents organized a ballot measure. The law took effect on 1 September.
- New York (24 June): **Governor Andrew Cuomo from the US state of New York signs a same-sex marriage bill into law.** The bill was previously approved two hours early 33–29 by the state Senate and 80–63 by the state Assembly on 15 June. It came into effect on 24 July.
- 1 July: A civil unions bill in the US state of Rhode Island becomes effective, Independent Governor Lincoln Chafee signed the bill on 2 July 2011 but the law was made retroactive from 1 July 2011. The bill was previously approved 21–16 by the state Senate on 29 June and by the Assembly in a 62–11 vote on 20 May.
- 12 July: A civil partnerships bill is unanimously approved in Jersey. It took effect on 2 April 2012.
- 26 July: The Constitutional Court of Colombia rules that same-sex couples have the right to form a family and orders the Congress to pass legislation addressing the issue of same-sex marriage before 20 June 2013. If such a law is not passed until then, same-sex couples will be able to apply for marriage-like rights automatically.
- 1 August: Same-sex marriage is in effect legalized by the Suquamish tribe in the US state of Washington for tribe members.
- 25 October: The Superior Court of Justice of Brazil rules that two women can legally be married.
- 28 November: First same-sex marriages are held in Quintana Roo, Mexico, because the state's civil code does not state sex or gender requirements for marriage.
- 30 November: The state parliament of Queensland, Australia, passes a civil partnerships bill in a 47–40 vote. The law came into effect on 23 February 2012.
- Alagoas (7 December): **The Court of Justice of the Brazilian state of Alagoas extends marriage to same-sex couples.**

=== 2012 ===
- Washington (13 February): **Governor Christine Gregoire from the US state of Washington signs a same-sex marriage bill into law**. The bill was priorly approved 55–43 by the state House on 8 February and 28–21 by the state Senate on 1 February. However, opponents organized a referendum that took place on 6 November.
- Maryland (1 March): **Governor Martin O'Malley from the US state of Maryland signs a same-sex marriage bill into law.** The bill was previously approved by the Senate, 25–22, on 23 February and by the House, 72–67, on 17 February. However, opponents organized a referendum that took place on 6 November.
- Denmark (7 June): **The Parliament of Denmark legalizes same-sex marriage in an 85–24 vote, becoming the eighth country in Europe, and eleventh overall, to do so.** The law took effect on 15 June. Denmark was previously the first country to legally recognize same-sex couples through registered partnerships in 1989.
- 10 June: A judicial court in Uruguay declares a foreign same-sex marriage valid, making it the first legal same-sex marriage in the country. The ruling also affirmed that local laws already permit same-sex marriage, even if they do not state it literally, and that Uruguayans married overseas can go to a judge to have their marriages recognized.
- Sergipe (5 July): **The Court of Justice of the Brazilian state of Sergipe issues "Provimento nº 06/2012", extending marriage to same-sex couples.**
- Espírito Santo (15 August): **The Court of Justice of the Brazilian state of Espírito Santo extends marriage to same-sex couples.**
- Bahia (10 October): **The Court of Justice of the Brazilian state of Bahia extends marriage to same-sex couples.** The ruling came into effect on 26 November.
- Bonaire, Sint Eustatius and Saba (10 October): **Same-sex marriage is legalized in the Bonaire, Sint Eustatius and Saba after the Dutch Parliament passed a law extending its same-sex marriage law to the special municipalities**. The first same-sex marriage was performed on Saba on 4 December 2012 between a Dutch and a Venezuelan man, both residing in Aruba.
- 6 November: The Spanish Constitutional Court upholds the country's same-sex marriage law after the ruling People's Party filed a lawsuit arguing that it was unconstitutional. After the ruling, the Spanish Minister of Justice said that the government will accept the verdict and drop plans to change the law.
- 6 November: Voters in the US states of Maine, Maryland, and Washington approve same-sex marriage laws in referendums, becoming the first jurisdictions in the world to legalize same-sex marriage through this process, while voters in the US state of Minnesota become the first to reject a constitutional amendment seeking to ban same-sex marriage in their state. The laws of Washington, Maine and Maryland, came into effect on 6 December 2012, 29 December 2012 and 1 January 2013 respectively.
- 26 November: Same-sex marriages begin in the Brazilian state of Bahia.
- Federal District (Brazil) (1 December): **The Court of Justice of the Brazilian Federal District extends marriage to same-sex couples.**
- 5 December: Supreme Court of Mexico unanimously finds the same-sex marriage ban in the state of Oaxaca unconstitutional, paving the way for same-sex marriages nationally. Same-sex marriage was already legal in Quintana Roo and Mexico City.
- Piauí (15 December): **The Court of Justice of the Brazilian state of Piauí extends marriage to same-sex couples.**
- São Paulo (18 December): **The Court of Justice of the Brazilian state of São Paulo legalizes same-sex marriage.** Same-sex marriages were already offered in six other Brazilian states and in the country's Federal District. The ruling came into effect on 1 March 2013.

=== 2013 ===
- Ceará (7 March): **The Court of Justice of the Brazilian state of Ceará rules, from 15 March on, that notaries statewide are required to perform same-sex marriages**.
- 21 March: Governor John Hickenlooper from the U.S. state of Colorado signs a civil unions bill into law. The bill was previously approved by the House of Representatives on 12 March in a 39–26 vote and by the Senate in a 21–14 vote on 11 February. It came into effect on 1 May.
- 22 March: The Bundesrat of Germany passes a state-level initiative which will open marriage to same-sex couples. The bill will advance in the Bundestag where an identical bill was rejected in 2012. The legislation was proposed by 5 states of Germany.
- Mato Grosso do Sul (2 April): **The Court of Justice of the Brazilian State of Mato Grosso do Sul extends marriage to same-sex couples**.
- Paraná (3 April): **The Court of Justice of the Brazilian State of Paraná extends marriage to same-sex couples**.
- Uruguay (10 April): **The Chamber of Deputies of Uruguay legalizes same-sex marriage with 71 affirmative votes (out of 92) in its second reading**, making Uruguay the second country in Latin America, after Argentina, and twelfth overall, to legalize same-sex marriage. The law was previously passed by the Senate on 2 April by a 23–8 vote. The bill was signed into law on 3 May 2013. It came into force on 5 August 2013.
- 14 April: The Constitutional Convention of Ireland, which was charged with making recommendations to the Irish Government in respect of changes to the country's Constitution, votes overwhelmingly (79%) in favour of amending the Constitution to allow for same-sex marriage. The Irish Government will respond to the decision within 4 months. An Tanaiste, Eamon Gilmore, the Deputy Prime Minister of Ireland, states in July that a referendum to introduce same-sex marriage in Ireland may take place in 2014.
- New Zealand (17 April): **The Parliament of New Zealand legalizes same-sex marriage by a 77–44 vote in the bill's third reading,** making New Zealand the first country in Oceania, and thirteenth overall, to legalize same-sex marriage. The bill received Royal Assent two days later. It came into effect on 19 August 2013.
- 17 April: The General Magistrate of Justice of the Brazilian state of Rio de Janeiro, Valmir de Oliveira Silva, authorizes local judges to perform same-sex marriages if they agree to do so. The ruling states that couples must register their request in the civil registry and then wait 15 days for the district to decide whether to perform it or not.
- Rondônia (26 April): **The Court of Justice of the Brazilian state of Rondônia publishes a Provision (008/2013-CG) which extends marriage to same-sex couples** and the conversion of stable unions into marriages throughout the State.
- Santa Catarina and Paraíba (29 April): **The Court of Justice of the Brazilian states of both Santa Catarina and Paraíba extend marriage to same-sex couples**.
- Rhode Island (2 May)**: Governor Lincoln Chafee from the U.S. state of Rhode Island signs a same-sex marriage bill into law.** The bill was passed shortly before with a final 56–15 vote in the House of Representatives and on 24 April by the state Senate in a 26–12 vote. It came into effect on 1 August 2013.
- Delaware (7 May): **Governor Jack Markell from the U.S. state of Delaware signs a same-sex marriage bill into law.** The bill was passed shortly before by the state Senate by a 12–9 vote and on 23 April by the House of Representatives by a 23–18 vote. It took effect on 1 July 2013.
- Brazil (14 May): **The Justice's National Council of Brazil legalizes same-sex marriage in the entire country by a 14–1 vote,** making Brazil the third country in South America, after Argentina and Uruguay, and fifteenth in the world to legalize same-sex marriage nationwide. The same-sex marriage was already legal in 12 states and the Federal District. The Council's ruling orders all civil register of the country to grant same-sex marriages. The ruling was published on 15 May and took effect on 16 May 2013.
- Minnesota (14 May): **Governor Mark Dayton from the U.S. state of Minnesota signs a same-sex marriage bill into law.** The bill was passed a day before by the state Senate by a 37–30 vote and on 9 May by the House of Representatives by a 75–59 vote. It came into effect on 1 August 2013.

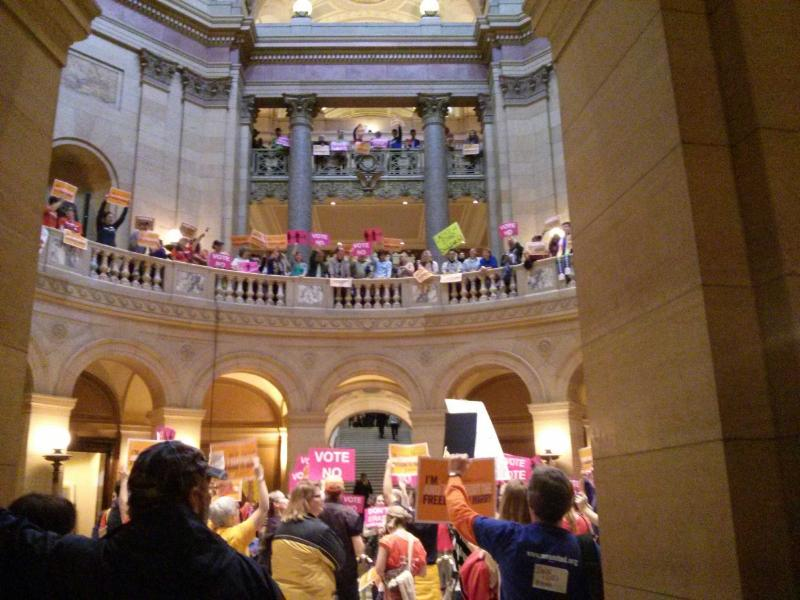
Minnesota State House, 2013

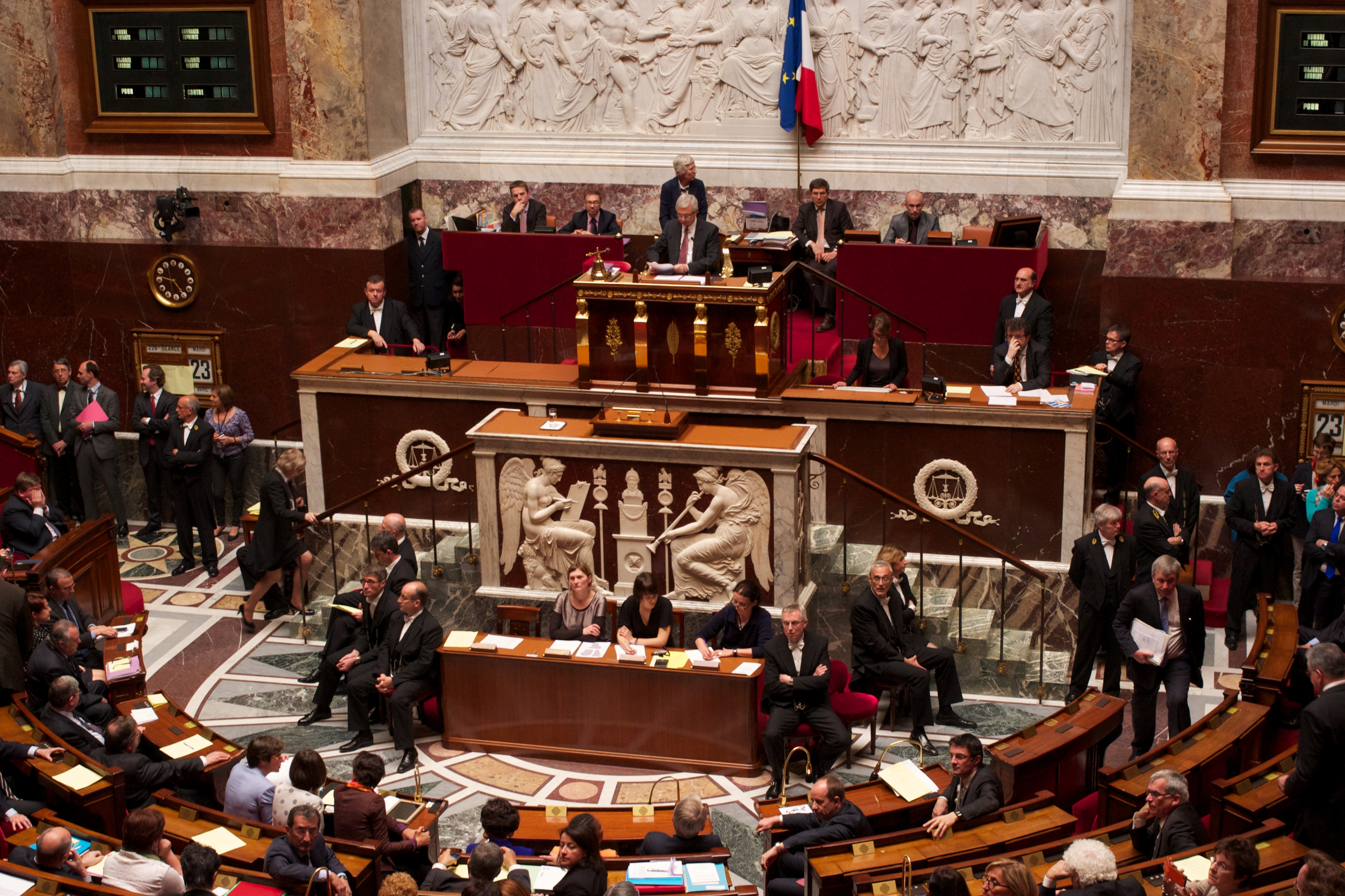
The National Assembly of France gives final approval to the same-sex marriage bill by a 331–225 vote.

- France (18 May): **President François Hollande of France signs a same-sex marriage bill into law,** making France the fourteenth country in the world to legalize same-sex marriage. The bill was introduced to the National Assembly by the government on 14 November 2012, who approved it by a 329–229 vote on 12 February 2013. The Bill was then sent to the Senate who approved it with amendments by a 179–157 vote on 12 April. As parts of it were changed, the Bill was thus sent back to the lower house on 17 April for a final scrutiny and passed on 23 April by a 331–225 vote. The law was validated by the Constitutional Council of France on 17 May. François Hollande, President of France, signed it into law on 18 May. It took effect on 19 May 2013, making France the thirteenth country to effectively implement same-sex marriage.
- 20 June: Deadline given by the Colombian Constitutional Court for Parliament to legislate on same-sex unions ends. Notaries across the country begin performing "marital contracts" for same-sex couples, however, LGBT activists advice people not to engage in those contracts as they did not exist in the country's laws. In the following days, several couples make petitions to civil judges to have their relationships recognized through marriage.
- California (26 June): **The Supreme Court of the United States rules that supporters of Proposition 8, the same-sex marriage ban in California, lacked standing to appeal a court's 2010 decision that deemed the ban unconstitutional, thus legalizing same-sex marriage in California**. Marriages resumed in the state two days later. The Supreme Court also declares Section 3 of the Defense of Marriage Act, the portion of the law that barred federal recognition of same-sex marriages, unconstitutional.
- 17 July: **Queen Elizabeth II gives Royal Assent to the Marriage (Same Sex Couples) Bill, legalizing same-sex marriage in England and Wales.** This occurs after the House of Lords passed the bill in a third and final reading two days before, and the amended version was approved by the House of Commons the following day.
- 24 July: Colombia's first same-sex marriage takes place in Bogotá after a local judge accepted the marriage petition of a male couple.
- 30 July: The Mexican state of Colima allows same-sex civil unions.
- New Mexico (21 August – 4 September): **Same-sex marriages begin in several New Mexico counties after a series of judicial and county clerk decisions.** Counties include: Doña Ana, Santa Fe, Bernalillo, San Miguel, Valencia, Taos, Grant, and Los Alamos counties.
- New Jersey (21 October): **State officials of the U.S. state of New Jersey begin performing same-sex marriages.** Officials were able to perform such marriages after the Supreme Court of New Jersey upheld a denial of a motion for a stay issued by a lower court in the case Garden Estate Equality v Dow.
- 5 November: The Government of Ireland announces a same-sex marriage referendum to take place before the summer of 2015.
- Hawaii (13 November): **Governor Neil Abercrombie from the U.S. state of Hawaii signs a bill granting marriage to same-sex couples, making Hawaii the fifteenth such US state.** The legislation was approved by the state Senate by a 19–4 vote on 12 November and previously by the House by a 30–19 vote on 8 November. This legislation started to be debated on 28 October 2013.
- Illinois (20 November): **Governor Pat Quinn from the US state of Illinois signs a bill granting marriage to same-sex couples.** The legislation was previously approved by the House by a 61–54 vote on 5 November and by the Senate by a 34–21 vote on 14 February.
- 20 November: The Scottish Parliament passes the Marriage and Civil Partnership Bill through the first Stage by a 98–15 vote. The bill was previously approved by the Equal Opportunities Committee.
- 1 December: Croatia passes a constitutional amendment banning same-sex marriage and defining marriage as strictly a union between a man and woman. The amendment was passed via a referendum with 65% of voters voting for it.
- 12 December: The High Court of Australia decides unanimously that a legislative act granting marriage to same-sex couples in the Australian Capital Territory (ACT) "cannot operate concurrently with the federal Marriage Act 1961." The court said that such marriages have no effect under the act and that it is matter of the federal Parliament to amend the federal marriage law. The ACT passed legislation granting marriage to same-sex couples in a 9–8 party-line vote on 22 October. The first marriages were solemnized on 7 December but have been annulled as unconstitutional.
- New Mexico (19 December): **The Supreme Court of the U.S. state of New Mexico ordered state officials to issue marriage licenses to same-sex couples in the case Griego v. Oliver.**

=== 2014 ===
- Scotland (4 February): **The Scottish Parliament approved the Marriage and Civil Partnership Bill through the third Stage by a 105–18 vote.** On 20 November 2013, the Parliament passed the bill through the first stage by a 98–15 vote and then ended the second stage on 16 January. The bill received royal assent on 12 March.
- 21 February: The U.S. District Court for Illinois found the state's ban on same-sex marriage unconstitutional in the case Lee and others v. Orr and ordered that Cook County's officials must issue marriage licenses to same-sex couples. Other counties followed several days later. Illinois had already signed into law a legislation granting marriage to same-sex couples on 20 November 2013 which took effect on 1 June 2014
- 26 February: The U.S. District Court for Western Texas found the state's ban on same-sex marriage unconstitutional in the case De Leon v. Perry.
- England and Wales (13 March): **Legislation to allow same-sex marriage in England and Wales came into force**, with the first same-sex marriages taking place on 29 March 2014.
- 21 March: The Parliament of Gibraltar approved the Civil Partnership bill 2014 through the third reading in a 16–0 vote.'
- 21 March: The U.S. District Court for Michigan found the state's ban on same-sex marriage unconstitutional in the case DeBoer v. Snyder.
- 9 April: The Italian Civil Court of Grosseto ordered the recognition of a same-sex marriage contracted abroad.
- 14 April: The Parliament of Malta approved the Civil Unions bill 2014 through the third reading in a 37–0.
- 23 April: The Supreme Court of Mexico unanimously found the same-sex marriage ban in the southern state of Oaxaca unconstitutional. As a final decision the Court set a precedent in the State of Oaxaca. The Court ordered the state officials to comply with the ruling.
- 9 May: The Circuit Court of Pulaski County of the U.S. state of Arkansas found the state's ban on same-sex marriage unconstitutional in the case Wright v. Arkansas. After approximately 450 same-sex couples received marriage licenses in several Arkansas counties, the Arkansas Supreme Court suspended Judge Piazza's ruling after a week on 16 May 2014 and enforced a stay while the decision is appealed by Arkansas' Democratic Attorney General Dustin McDaniel.
- 13 May: The U.S. District Court of Idaho struck down the marriage laws prohibiting same-sex couples from marrying in the case Latta v. Otter. Same-sex marriage in Idaho would have become legal on 16 May 2014 at 9:00 am. MDT but the ruling was eventually stayed by an appeals court.
- Oregon (19 May): **The U.S. District Court of Oregon found the state's ban on same-sex marriage unconstitutional in the case Geiger v. Kitzhaber, legalizing same-sex marriage in Oregon.**
- Pennsylvania (20 May): **The U.S. District Court of Pennsylvania found the state's ban on same-sex marriage unconstitutional in the case Whitewood v. Wolf, legalizing same-sex marriage in Pennsylvania.**
- 1 June: Legislation granting the right to marry took effect in Illinois.
- Luxembourg (18 June): **The Chamber of Deputies of Luxembourg approved legislation that grants same-sex couples the right to marry in 56–4 vote and the law takes effect 1 January 2015**. On 24 June the Council of State gave its consent to skip a second vote on the measure. The bill was promulgated by Grand Duke Henri on 4 July and was published in the official gazette on 17 July. It came into effect on 1 January 2015.
- 19 June: In Vietnam, a law is approved that will abolish the ban on same-sex marriage although same-sex marriages will not be recognized. The revised law, which was approved by the National Assembly (NA) on 19 June 2014, will come into effect on 1 January 2015.
- 25 June: The United States Court of Appeals for the Tenth Circuit found the Utah ban on same-sex marriage unconstitutional in the case Kitchen v. Herbert but stayed pending appeal. The decision was delivered by a three-judge panel with a 2–1 split vote in favor of upholding a lower court opinion decided on 20 December 2013.
- 1 July: The U.S. District Court for Kentucky found the state's ban on same-sex marriage unconstitutional in the case Love v. Beshear.
- 10 July: The District Court of the Boulder County, Colorado, ruled in favor for the county official who defied the state ban on same-sex marriage when the 10th Circuit issued and stayed the opinion in the case Kitchen v. Herbert. Denver and Pueblo county announced that they will issue marriage licenses for same-sex couples too.
- 15 July: The Croatian Parliament approved the Life Partnership bill in an 89–16 vote.
- 18 July: The United States Court of Appeals for the Tenth Circuit found the Oklahoma ban on same-sex marriage unconstitutional in the case Bishop v. United States but stayed pending appeal. The decision was in favor of upholding a lower court opinion decided on 14 January 2014.
- 23 July: The U.S. District Court of Colorado struck down the state ban on same-sex marriage in the case Burns v. Hickenlooper. The Tenth Circuit stayed the ruling on 21 August.
- 25 July: The District Court of the Miami-Dade County, Florida, ruled unconstitutional the state ban on same-sex marriage in the case Pareto v. Ruvin. This is the second ruling in favor of same-sex couples in 8 days, the first was decided by the District Court of the Monroe County, Florida in the case Huntsman v. Heavilin. Both cases are stayed pending the appeal.
- 28 July: The United States Court of Appeals for the Fourth Circuit found the Virginia ban on same-sex marriage unconstitutional in the case Bostic v. Schaefer. The decision was in favor of upholding a lower court opinion decided on 13 February 2014.
- 21 August: The U.S. District Court of Florida found the state's ban on same-sex marriage unconstitutional in the cases Brenner v. Scott and Grimsley v. Scott.
- Coahuila (1 September): **The Congress of the Mexican state of Coahuila approved the legislation that grants the right to marry to same-sex couples in a 19–1 vote.**
- 4 September: The United States Court of Appeals for the Seventh Circuit found the Indiana and Wisconsin ban on same-sex marriage unconstitutional. The unanimous decision upheld a lower ruling from Indiana in the case of Baskin v. Bogan and another ruling from Wisconsin in the case Wolf v. Walker.
- **6 October: The United States Supreme Court allowed appeals court decisions striking down same-sex marriage bans in Virginia, Indiana, Wisconsin, Oklahoma, and Utah to stand, allowing same-sex couples to begin marrying immediately in those five states and creating binding legal precedent that has nullified bans in six other states in the Fourth, Seventh, and Tenth Circuits (Colorado, Kansas, North Carolina, South Carolina, West Virginia, and Wyoming).**
- Norfolk Island (7 October): **Norfolk Island introduces bill to legalise same-sex marriage. The bill was passed in December**
- United States (7 October): **The Supreme Court of the U.S. state of Colorado dismissed the case Brinkman v. Long and vacated the stay, thus legalizing same-sex marriage throughout the state.** The case was decided on 9 July by the District Court of the Adams County, Colorado, which ruled unconstitutional the state ban on same-sex marriage
- 7 October: The United States Court of Appeals for the Ninth Circuit struck down same-sex marriage bans in Idaho and Nevada. This is expected to rapidly nullify bans in other jurisdictions covered by the Ninth Circuit: Guam and the Northern Mariana Islands.
- Nevada (8 October): United States Supreme Court Justice Anthony Kennedy issued an order staying the implementation of same-sex marriage in Nevada and Idaho. Later that day, Kennedy stated that his order of 8 October was erroneous in mentioning Nevada and revised it to apply only to Idaho. **Same-sex marriages begin in Nevada.**
- 9 October: The Parliament of Estonia approved the Civil Partnerships Bill 2014 through the third reading in 40–38 vote. It was signed by President Toomas Hendrik Ilves the same day and will take effect on 1 January 2016. It came into effect on 1 January 2016.
- West Virginia (9 October): The Attorney General of West Virginia announced that in light of the Supreme Court declining to review the Fourth Circuit ruling, he considers **same-sex marriage legal in West Virginia**, and he will stop defending the state's law banning same-sex marriage. The Governor of West Virginia issued a similar statement and ordered all state agencies to comply. Marriage licenses were issued immediately.
- North Carolina (10 October): U.S. District Judge Max Cogburn, ruling in General Synod of the United Church of Christ v. Cooper, struck down North Carolina's ban, citing the Fourth Circuit Court of Appeals in Bostic v. Schaefer. **Marriages in North Carolina began that day.**
- 10 October: The Supreme Court lifts Kennedy's order of 8 October and denies Idaho's request for a further stay. The Idaho case returns to the Ninth Circuit for Monday hearings.
- Alaska (12 October): District Court Judge Timothy Burgess strikes down the ban on same-sex marriage in Alaska, with immediate effect, making **same-sex marriage legal in Alaska**.
- Idaho (15 October): **Same-sex marriage becomes legal in Idaho** with the lifting of the stay in Latta v. Otter.
- Arizona (17 October): U.S. District Judge John Sedwick rules Arizona's ban on same-sex marriage to be unconstitutional, making **same-sex marriage legal in Arizona.**
- Wyoming (17 October): U.S. District Judge Scott Skavdahl rules Wyoming's ban on same-sex marriage to be unconstitutional. On 21 October, Wyoming notified the court that they will not appeal, and **same-sex marriages start in Wyoming.**
- 4 November: **U.S. District Judge Daniel D. Crabtree rules in Marie v. Moser that Kansas's ban on same-sex marriage is unconstitutional.** His decision takes effect on 12 November when the state defendants exhaust their options for obtaining a stay pending appeal.
- 7 November: U.S. District Judge Ortrie Smith rules in Lawson v. Kelly that Missouri's ban on same-sex marriage is unconstitutional, staying his order pending appeal.
- South Carolina (12 November): U.S. District Judge Richard Gergel rules in Condon v. Haley that South Carolina's ban on same-sex marriage is unconstitutional. His decision takes effect on 20 November, and **same-sex marriages begin in South Carolina.**
- Montana (19 November): U.S. District Judge Brian Morris rules in Rolando v. Fox that Montana's ban on same-sex marriage is unconstitutional, **making same-sex marriage legal in Montana.**
- 25 November: Two U.S. district courts struck down state bans on same-sex marriage in Arkansas in Jernigan v. Crane and in Mississippi in Campaign for Southern Equality v. Bryant.
- Finland (28 November): **The Parliament of Finland votes to legalize same-sex marriage by a vote of 105–92.** Secondary legislation would be required before this law came into effect. The first same-sex marriages took place on 1 March 2017.
- 16 December: The Irish Government decides to hold the Marriage Equality referendum in May 2015. The referendum, which is expected to be held on 22 May, proposes to add to the Irish Constitution a declaration that "marriage may be contracted in accordance with law by two persons without distinction as to their sex". Ireland introduced civil partnership in 2011.
- 23 December: The Parliament of Taiwan (The Republic of China) considered legislation to legalize same-sex marriage. Opposition Democratic Progressive Party (DPP) lawmaker Cheng Li-chiun proposed a bill with gender-neutral wording.

=== 2015 ===
- 1 January: An amended Marriage and Family Law becomes effective in Vietnam, allowing same-sex couples to marry (albeit without legal recognition).
- Florida (6 January): **Same-sex marriage becomes legal in Florida.**
- 20 January: The Chamber of Deputies of Chile approves legislation to create the civil union pact (pacto de unión civil or PUC), that was already approved by the Senate.
- Alabama (23 January): **Same-sex marriage becomes legal in Alabama.**
- Finland (20 February): **President Sauli Niinistö of Finland signs a same-sex marriage bill into law**, making Finland the last of the Nordic countries to legalize same-sex marriage. The bill was approved by Parliament in November 2014 and it took effect in March 2017.
- 4 March: The parliament of Slovenia approves a same-sex marriage bill by a vote of 51–28. However, the National Assembly then organized a referendum that took place on 20 December.
- Pitcairn Islands (14 May): **Same-sex marriage becomes legal in Pitcairn Islands.**
- Ireland (22 May): **The Republic of Ireland is the first country in the world to approve same-sex marriage and its constitutional protection by a popular vote in a referendum.** There was a yes vote of 62% to a no vote of 38%.
- Greenland (26 May): **Greenland's parliament, by a vote of 27–0, unanimously approves same-sex marriage.** The law entered into force on 1 April 2016.
- 3 June: Mexico's Supreme Court rules that state laws banning same-sex marriage are discriminatory.
- 5 June: A federal judge strikes down a law in the U.S. territory of Guam that defined marriage as between couples of the opposite sex, thereby allowing same sex marriage to commence.
- Chihuahua (12 June): **Same-sex marriage becomes legal in Chihuahua.**
- United States (26 June): **Same-sex marriage becomes legal in the United States of America** as a result of a Supreme Court ruling. Marriages started immediately except in Louisiana and Mississippi.
- Puerto Rico (15 July): **Same-sex marriage becomes legal in Puerto Rico** as a result of a Supreme Court ruling.
- Ireland (29 August): **The President of Ireland formally signs same-sex marriage protection into the Irish Constitution**, the first country to do so, following the successful Marriage Equality referendum on 22 May 2015.
- 22 September: The States of Jersey, Channel Islands, agrees, in principle, on a vote of 37 to 4 with 1 abstention that same-sex couples should be allowed to marry. Legislation to bring the law into effect is scheduled to be introduced by January 2017.
- 26 November: The Civil Partnership Bill was passed by the Cyprus House, Interior Ministry has announced. The bill passed with 39 votes for, 12 against, while three MPs abstained.
- 10 December: The States of Guernsey, Channel Islands, agrees in a vote of 37 to 7 to introduce same sex marriage.
- Nayarit (17 December): **A bill to legalize same-sex marriage in the Mexican state of Nayarit is approved by the state congress, in a 26–1 vote, with 1 abstention.**
- 20 December: In a referendum, Slovenian voters overturned by a two-to-one margin the same-sex marriage bill that had been passed by the parliament on 4 March.
- 23 December: The Greek Parliament passes same-sex civil unions law which legalised civil partnerships.

=== 2016 ===
- 25 February: The Italian Senate approves a Civil Union bill in a 173–71 vote. The bill would then face a vote in the Chamber of Deputies.
- 4 March: Ecuadorian province of Azuay unanimously approves an ordinance which creates a marriage register for same-sex couples. As marriage is regulated by the Ecuadorian state, the ordinance of Azuay only represents a symbolic recognition.
- 8 March: A same-sex marriage bill passes 17–3 in the House of Keys, the lower branch of the parliament of the Isle of Man.
- 26 April: A same-sex marriage bill passes 6–3 in the Legislative Council of the Isle of Man. The bill now awaits royal assent before same sex marriage is legalised in the Isle of Man.
- Colombia (28 April): **The Constitutional Court of Colombia legalizes same-sex marriage in a 6–3 decision.**
- 11 May: The Italian Chamber of Deputies approves a Civil Union bill in a 372–51 vote, awaiting signing into law by the President of Italy.
- Jalisco (12 May): **Same-sex marriage becomes legal in the Mexican state of Jalisco**.
- 20 May: Same-sex civil unions become legal in Italy after the President of Italy signs the bill into law.
- Campeche (20 May): **Same sex marriage becomes legal in the Mexican state of Campeche, following a 34–1 vote.**
- Colima (12 June): **Same sex marriage becomes legal in the Mexican state of Colima, following a 24–0 vote.**
- Michoacán (23 June): **Same-sex marriage becomes legal in the Mexican state of Michoacán, following a 27–0 vote.**
- Morelos (5 July): **Same-sex marriage becomes legal in the Mexican state of Morelos, following a 20**–**6 vote.**
- Isle of Man (22 July): **Same-sex marriage becomes legal in the Isle of Man, after receiving royal assent on 19 July**.
- British Antarctic Territory (13 October): **Same-sex marriage becomes legal in the British Antarctic Territory**,
- Gibraltar (15 December): **Same-sex marriage becomes legal in the British Overseas Territory of Gibraltar.** It was passed by Parliament on 26 October and received royal assent on 1 November.

=== 2017 ===
- Ascension Island (1 January): **Same-sex marriage becomes legal in Ascension Island.**
- Finland (1 March): **Same-sex marriage becomes legal in Finland.**
- Falkland Islands (13 April): **Same-sex marriage becomes legal in Falkland Islands.**
- Guernsey (2 May): **Same-sex marriage becomes legal in Guernsey.**
- Bermuda (5 May): **Same-sex marriage becomes legal in Bermuda.**
- 24 May: Taiwan's Constitutional Court rules that same-sex marriage is legal. This court ruling goes into effect no later than 24 May 2019.
- 30 June: Same-sex marriage passes a vote of the Lower House in Germany.
- Faroe Islands (1 July): **Same-sex marriage becomes legal in Faroe Islands.**
- 7 July: Same-sex marriage passes the Bundesrat in Germany.
- Chiapas (11 July): **Same-sex marriage becomes legal in the Mexican state of Chiapas, following a decision of the Mexican Supreme Court.**
- Puebla (1 August): **The Supreme Court of Mexico declares same-sex marriage to be legal in the state of Puebla.**
- Tristan da Cunha (4 August): **Same-sex marriage becomes legal in Tristan da Cunha.**
- Malta (1 September): **Same-sex marriage becomes legal in Malta.** A bill for legalization passed Parliament on 12 July and was signed by the President on 1 August.
- Germany (1 October): **Same-sex marriage becomes legal in Germany.**
- Baja California (3 November): **Same-sex marriage becomes legal in the Mexican state of Baja California by government decree.**
- 15 November: Same-sex marriage is approved by a non-binding postal plebiscite in Australia, with 61.6% of the population voting yes. When an amendment to the Marriage Act 1961 was passed by parliament (on 29 November), Australia legalised same-sex marriage.
- 29 November: The Australian Senate approves a same-sex marriage bill by 43 votes to 12.
- 4 December: The Constitutional Court of Austria decides to open marriage for same-sex couples by 1 January 2019.
- 7 December: The Australian House of Representatives passes a vote in favor of same-sex marriage upon third reading, with 136 voting in favor, four voting against and eight abstaining.
- Australia (9 December): **Same-sex marriage becomes legal in Australia.**
- 14 December: Senators in Bermuda vote to ban any further same-sex marriage and institute domestic partnerships for same-sex couples, months after its Supreme Court legalized it.
- 19 December: Legislative Council of St Helena votes to legalise same-sex marriage.
- Saint Helena (20 December): **Same sex marriage becomes legal in Saint Helena.**

=== 2018 ===
- 9 January: After a motion presented by Costa Rica requesting clarifications on the rights of same-sex couples, the Inter-American Court of Human Rights ruled that all signatory parties of the Pact of San José were required to provide the same rights to same-sex couples, including marriage, possibly legalizing same-sex marriage in most of the Americas. The governments of Costa Rica and Panama announced that they would comply.
- Bermuda (1 June): **Same-sex marriage is no longer legal in Bermuda.**
- 5 June: The European Court of Justice rules, in Coman and Others v General Inspectorate for Immigration and Ministry of the Interior, that EU member states should recognise same-sex marriages for the purpose of residency if at least one person in the marriage is an EU citizen. Slovakia announces that they will comply with this ruling, recognising marriages performed abroad.
- 6 June: Supreme Court of Bermuda strikes down the ban on same-sex marriage, five days after the ban goes into effect.
- 13 June: 46 deputies in the Czech parliament introduce a bill which would legalise same-sex marriage in the country.
- Alderney (14 June): **Same-sex marriage becomes legal in Alderney.**
- 19 June: The Supreme Court of the Philippines begins hearing a case to legalise same-sex marriage.
- 29 June: Two family judges in Ecuador rule that same-sex couples have a right to marry. However, the decision was overturned by The Labor Chamber of the Provincial Court of Justice of Ecuador on 10 September, which ruled that the legalisation of same-sex marriage was a decision for the National Assembly or the Constitutional Court.
- Jersey (1 July): **Same-sex marriage becomes legal in Jersey.**
- 8 August: The Supreme Court of Costa Rica orders that same-sex marriage must be legalised by 2020.
- 4 September: Senator Germán Martínez introduces a bill to legalise same-sex marriage federally in Mexico.
- 7 October: A referendum to constitutionally ban same-sex marriage in Romania fails due to low turnout.
- Bermuda (23 November): **Same-sex marriage becomes legal in Bermuda again after the government appeal of 6 June decision fails.**
- 5 December: Same-sex civil unions become legal in San Marino. It had previously passed civil unions legislation in a vote of 40 to 4.

=== 2019 ===
- Austria (1 January): **Same-sex marriage becomes legal in Austria.**
- 11 January: The Supreme Court of Lithuania rules that the Lithuanian state must grant residency rights to the same-sex partners of European Union citizens.
- Nuevo León (19 February): **Same-sex marriage becomes legal in the Mexican state of Nuevo León.** A ruling by the Supreme Court of Justice of the Nation (SCJN) strikes down articles 140 and 148 of the Civil Code, which banned same-sex marriage.
- 29 March: The Grand Court of the Cayman Islands rules that same-sex marriage is legal in the Cayman Islands, but the ruling is stayed pending the conclusion of the government's appeal to the Cayman Islands Court of Appeal, the islands' highest court.
- Aguascalientes (2 April): **Same-sex marriage becomes legal in the Mexican state of Aguascalientes.**
- San Luis Potosí (21 May): **Same-sex marriage becomes legal in the Mexican state of San Luis Potosí.**
- Taiwan (24 May): **Same-sex marriage becomes legal in Taiwan, the first Asian country to do so.**
- Hidalgo (11 June): **Same-sex marriage becomes legal in the Mexican state of Hidalgo.**

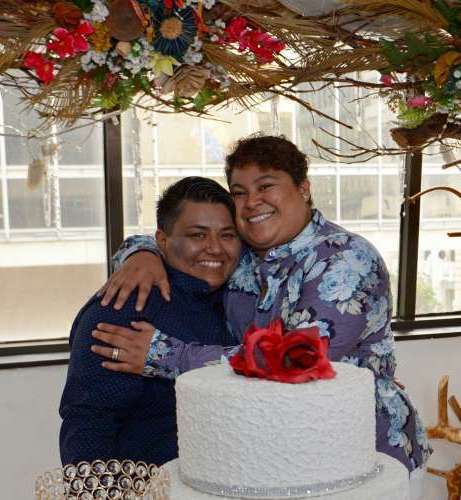
Alexandra Chávez and Michelle Avilés, first same-sex couple to get married in Ecuador

- Ecuador **(12 June): The Constitutional Court of Ecuador legalises same-sex marriage in a 5–4 vote.** The ruling came into effect on 8 July 2019.
- Baja California Sur (29 June): **Same-sex marriage becomes legal in the Mexican state of Baja California Sur.**
- 1 July: Ibaraki Prefecture becomes the first prefecture of Japan to enact a partnership oath system to recognize same-sex unions.
- 9 July: The Parliament of the United Kingdom enacts the Northern Ireland (Executive Formation etc) Act 2019, which includes a clause providing that same-sex marriage will become legal in Northern Ireland unless the Northern Ireland Assembly (Stormont) reconvened by a 21 October deadline.
- 25 July: The Supreme Administrative Court of Bulgaria rules that Bulgaria must grant residency rights to same-sex married couples including at least one citizen of the European Union, in conformity with the 2018 ruling of the European Court of Justice in Coman and Others v General Inspectorate for Immigration and Ministry of the Interior.
- Oaxaca (28 August): **Same-sex marriage becomes legal in the Mexican state of Oaxaca.** In a 25–10 vote, the Congress of Oaxaca repealed the state's ban on same-sex marriage, allowing such unions to take place immediately.
- 21 October: Since the Northern Ireland Assembly had not reconvened by this date, same-sex marriage will become legal in Northern Ireland on 13 January 2020.
- 29 October: The National Assembly of Panama passes a constitutional amendment proposal to ban same-sex marriage, which would have to be approved by popular referendum.

== 2020s ==
=== 2020 ===
- Northern Ireland (13 January): **Same-sex marriage becomes legal in Northern Ireland.**
- Sark (23 April): **Same-sex marriage becomes legal in Sark.**
- Costa Rica (26 May): **Same-sex marriage becomes legal in Costa Rica.**
- 23 June: Tel Aviv-Yafo begins registering same-sex marriages, although they are not recognized officially by the state.
- 1 July: Parliament of Montenegro legalizes civil partnerships for same-sex couples in a 42–5 vote and 34 abstentions. The act was subsequently signed by the incumbent president Milo Djukanovic. The law came into effect on 15 July 2021.
- 4 September: Recognition of same-sex civil partnerships in the Cayman Islands.
- 3 November: The legalization of same-sex marriage in Puebla is codified by the Congress of Puebla.
- 1 December: The Swiss Council of States votes to legalise same-sex marriage. The bill was previously approved by the Swiss National Council on 11 June.

=== 2021 ===
- 17 March: A Sapporo District Court in Japan rules that the country's failure to legalize same-sex marriage is 'unconstitutional'.
- Sinaloa (15 June): **The Congress of Sinaloa unanimously legalizes same-sex marriage**. The law came into effect on 30 June 2021.
- 16 June: A constitutional amendment to repeal the unenforced ban against same-sex marriage in Baja California is approved with 18 legislators in favor, 4 opposed and 1 abstention. It came into effect on 9 August 2021.
- 25 August: The Congress of Yucatán amends the state's Constitution to legalize same-sex marriage by 20 votes to 5. The Congress was given an additional 180 day period to change laws to reflect the constitutional change.
- 22 September: **The Congress of Querétaro legalizes same-sex marriage by 21 votes to 4**. The law came into effect on 13 November 2021.
- 23 September: **The Congress of Sonora legalizes same-sex marriage by 26 votes to 7**. The law came into effect on 22 October 2021.
- 26 September: **Same-sex marriage in Switzerland is approved in the 2021 Swiss same-sex marriage referendum with 64.1% of the population voting yes**.
- 7 December: Tokyo governor Yuriko Koike announces Tokyo will move to recognise same-sex partnerships beginning April 2022.

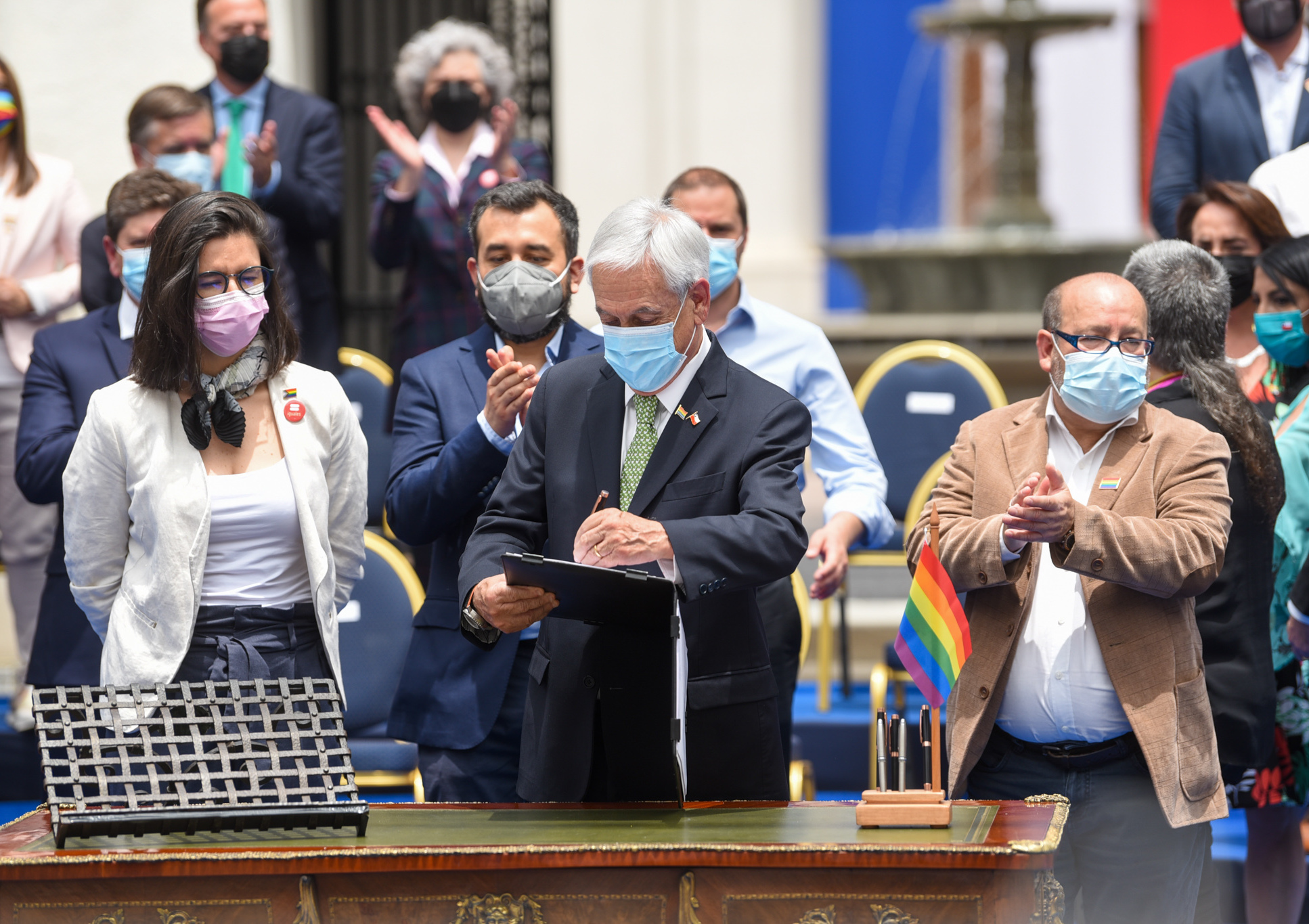
President Sebastian Piñera of Chile signs the same-sex marriage bill into law.

- 9 December: **President Sebastián Piñera of Chile signs a same-sex marriage bill into law.** The bill had been approved two days earlier by the Chamber of Deputies by 82 votes to 20 and by the Senate in a 21 to 8 vote. The law will take effect 90 days later (10 March 2022).
- 14 December: **The Congress of Zacatecas legalizes same-sex marriage by 18 votes to 10**. It came into effect on 29 December.
- 20 December: **Same-sex marriage becomes legal in the Mexican state of Guanajuato by government decree.** The government decision allows such unions to take place immediately.

=== 2022 ===
- Yucatán (1 March): The **Congress of Yucatán unanimously passes a bill amending all legislation to allow same-sex marriage**, following the Constitutional change on 25 August 2021. The law came into effect on 4 March 2022.
- Chile (10 March): **Same-sex marriage comes into effect in Chile**.
- 14 March: Judicial Committee of the Privy Council rules against same-sex marriage in Bermuda and the Cayman Islands. **Same-sex marriage is no longer legal in Bermuda.**
- 6 April: The Congress of Jalisco passes a bill to codify equal marriage into law, bringing the state Civil Code into conformity with the 2016 Supreme Court ruling.
- Veracruz (2 June): **The Congress of Veracruz passes a bill to legalize same-sex marriage**, following the ruling of the Supreme Court of Justice of the Nation on 30 May 2022. The law came into effect on 13 June 2022.
- 15 June: The National Assembly of Thailand gives first approval to four different bills allowing either civil partnerships or full same-sex marriages.
- Switzerland (1 July): **Same-sex marriage law comes into effect in Switzerland.**
- Slovenia (9 July): **Same-sex marriage becomes legal in Slovenia**, a day after the Constitutional Court published its June ruling that the statutory definition of marriage as a living community of a husband and a wife is unconstitutional.
- 21 July: The General Council of Andorra approves a new family code. The articles regarding same-sex marriage were voted with 18 votes in favour, 6 votes against and 1 abstention. The law will enter into force 6 months after receiving the signature of either co-prince.
- 22 July: The National Assembly of Cuba approves changes to The Family Code that legalize same-sex marriage. The Code is subject to the national referendum on 25 September 2022.
- 17 August: The new Family Code of Andorra is signed by Co-Prince Emmanuel Macron into law. The law will come into effect six months later (17 February 2023). It includes legalization of same-sex marriage.
- Durango (18 September): **Same-sex marriage becomes legal in the Mexican state of Durango**, via decree by Governor, signed 16 September.
- Cuba (25 September): **Cuba approves a new Family Code including same-sex marriage in a referendum.** It was signed into law by President Diaz-Canel the next day and came into effect on 27 September, when it was published on the Official Gazette.
- State of Mexico (11 October): **The Congress of the State of Mexico approves a law allowing same-sex marriage and concubinage** in a 50–16 vote, with 7 abstentions. The law came into force on 2 November 2022, a day after being published in the state's official newspaper.
- 18 October: The Parliament of Slovenia passes a law codifying the Constitutional Court's decision to legalize same-sex marriage and adoption in a 51–24 vote.
- Tabasco (19 October): **The Congress of Tabasco passes a bill legalizing same-sex marriage** in a 23–5 vote, coming into force on 27 October, a day after its publishing in the state's official newspaper.
- Guerrero (25 October): **The Congress of Guerrero passes a bill legalizing same-sex marriage and concubinage** in a 38–6 vote. It took effect on 31 December 2022, one day after it was published in the official newspaper.
- Tamaulipas (26 October): **The Congress of Tamaulipas passes a bill legalizing same-sex marriage** in a 23–12 vote. The bill takes effect one day after its publication in the official state journal on 18 November.
- 1 November: Tokyo Metropolis becomes the tenth and most populous prefecture in Japan to establish a domestic partnership registry to recognize same-sex couples with limited rights. In addition, the prefectural government recognizes existing registries established previously in Tokyo's wards and cities and recognizes children of registered partners (without extending joint adoption which is prohibited by national law).
- 2 November: Parliament of Liechtenstein passes a motion calling on government to introduce a bill legalizing same-sex marriage in a 23–2 vote.
- 29 November: Parliament of Singapore votes to amend the constitution, giving Parliament the sole right to define marriage, in an 83–2 vote.
- 8 December: The United States House of Representatives passes the Respect for Marriage Act. In July 2022, the bill passed 267–157, with 47 Republican representatives joining the Democrats. In December 2022, the United States Senate passed the bill 61–36, and the House again voted 258–169 to pass it.
- 13 December: United States President Joe Biden signs the Respect for Marriage Act, which repeals the 1996 Defense of Marriage Act, affirms Loving v. Virginia, and mandates that the federal government and all states recognize marriages which are legally performed in other jurisdictions of the United States, including same-sex and interracial marriages.
- 31 December: **Legality in all of Mexico**. Effective statewide in Guerrero, the final jurisdiction in Mexico. Access is not equal in all states, and same-sex marriage does not count as "marriage" in all states when it comes to adoption, but it is available across the country.

=== 2023 ===
- 19 January: Taiwan legalizes binational same-sex marriages between Taiwanese citizens and citizens of countries where same-sex marriage is not legal. In practice, this excludes citizens of most of the People's Republic of China (save for residents of Hong Kong and Macau), because cross-straits marriages must first be registered in China.
- 31 January: Slovenia's law implementing same sex marriage after the 9 July Constitutional Court judgment becomes effective.
- 14 February: Bangkok's Dusit district becomes the first jurisdiction in Thailand to issue partnership certificates, which are legally non-binding.
- Andorra (17 February): **Same-sex marriage comes into force in Andorra**.
- 8 April: Estonia's new to-be-formed coalition (now Kaja Kallas' third cabinet) agreed to marriage equality and legalize same sex marriage.
- 16 May: The Supreme Court of Namibia orders the government to recognize same-sex marriages conducted in other countries.
- 6 June: The congress of the Mexican state of Baja California Sur passes a bill recognizing same-sex couples in concubinage.
- 14 June: The congress of the Mexican state of Nuevo Leon passes a bill codifying same-sex marriage into law in a 23–10 vote. It had been legal in the state since a 2019 Supreme Court ruling.
- 20 June: The Parliament of Estonia votes 55–34 to legalize same-sex marriage, joint adoption, and pass implementing legislation for the cohabitation law. The law takes effect 1 January 2024.
- 28 June: A single judge bench of the Nepal Supreme Court orders the government to establish a separate register for sexual minorities and non-traditional couples and to temporarily register them. The first same-sex marriage was registered on 29 November. However, registration is temporary and does not confer any of the rights of marriage.
- 22 July: A high court in Peru rules that same-sex couples are entitled to have their marriages legally registered on public records.
- 13 December: The Cabinet of Thailand approves a bill enabling same-sex marriages, which was overwhelmingly passed by Parliament on 21 December.

=== 2024 ===
- Estonia (1 January): **Estonia's same-sex marriage law comes into effect.**
- Greece (16 February): **Same-sex marriage bill in Greece passed as the majority of the Parliament voted in favor.**
- 8 March: Liechtenstein approves a same-sex marriage bill on its first reading.
- 14 March: Sapporo High Court declares Japan's exclusively heterosexual definition of marriage to be unconstitutional.
- 27 March: Thailand's lower house passes bill to legalize same-sex marriage.
- 16 May: Liechtenstein's parliament votes to legalize same-sex marriage, with 24 out of 25 MPs supporting it. The law will come into effect on 1 January 2025.
- 18 June: Thailand's senate gives final approval to the Marriage Equality Act to legalize same-sex marriage and adoption. The law will come into effect 120 days after it receives royal assent and is officially published into law.
- 19 June: Aruba's parliament rejected a same-sex marriage bill on a 10–10 vote with one abstention.
- Aruba and Curaçao (12 July): **The Supreme Court of The Netherlands rules that same-sex marriage is legal in Aruba and Curaçao.** The ruling has immediate effect.
- 24 September: The King of Thailand signed the Marriage Equality Act into law. Same-sex marriage in Thailand can be legally performed starting on 23 January 2025.
- 30 October: Tokyo High Court rules that Japan's same-sex marriage ban is unconstitutional.

=== 2025 ===
- Liechtenstein (1 January): **Liechtenstein's same-sex marriage law comes into effect.**
- Thailand (23 January): **Thailand's Marriage Equality Act comes into effect.**
- 7 March: Nagoya High Court of Japan rules that prohibiting same-sex marriage is unconstitutional.
- 10 November: The Supreme Court of the United States rejects the Ermold v. Davis case.
- 25 November: European Court of Justice rules in Cupriak-Trojan and Trojan v Wojewoda Mazowiecki that same-sex marriages must be recognised across the European Union (however, potentially not as marriages but as, often lesser, forms of unions - e.g. civil partnerships).

=== 2026 ===
- 18 June: A three-judge bench of the Nepal Supreme Court orders the government to legalize same-sex marriage.

== See also ==
- Same-sex marriage
- Same-sex union legislation
- Status of same-sex marriage
- Timeline of LGBTQ history
- Timeline of same-sex marriage in the United States
