= Hillary Hall =

American county clerk (2006–2018)

Boulder County Clerk
- In office 2006–2018

Personal details
- Born: 1965 (age 60–61)
- Party: Democratic
- Education: University of Northern Colorado; Le Cordon Bleu College of Culinary Arts
- Known for: Issuing same-sex marriage licenses

Hillary Hall (born 1965) is an American politician. She was the Boulder County, Colorado, clerk and recorder from 2006 to 2018. She issued hundreds of marriage licenses to same-sex couples in 2014 before the Colorado Supreme Court ordered her to stop.

== Early life, education and family ==
Hillary Hall was born in 1965. She grew up in Boulder, Colorado, where she attended Fairview High School. She was a student government officer at Fairview and was described, then as now, as “a smart, visionary, compassionate person” by former Boulder County Commissioner Josie Heath. She attended the University of Northern Colorado and later Le Cordon Bleu College of Culinary Arts where she obtained a degree in culinary arts. Hall is married to Tim Enwall and they have two adult daughters.

== Career ==
Hall worked for her husband's technology company, managed restaurants, and owned her own catering company and cooking school before being elected Boulder County clerk and recorder in 2006, after beating the Democratic incumbent in the primary. She was re-elected in 2010 and 2014 before being term limited. Her only opponent in the 2014 race was Libertarian candidate Ralph Shnelvar. Previously she had worked with and served as chair of the Boulder County Democratic party. She had also been involved with monitoring prior elections.

== Issuance of same-sex marriage licenses ==
On June 25, 2014, the U.S. Court of Appeals for the 10th Circuit, which includes Colorado, issued an opinion in Kitchen v. Herbert declaring Utah's ban on gay marriage unconstitutional. Within hours Hall began issuing same-sex marriage licenses in Boulder County. Hall stated “Couples across Colorado have been waiting a long time to have their right to marry the person they love recognized. I want to act immediately to let them carry out that wish.”

Colorado Attorney General John Suthers sought an injunction to stop Hall on the ground that the 10th Circuit had issued a stay of its decision pending an appeal to the U.S. Supreme Court and Colorado law banned such marriages at the time. In the resulting case Colorado ex rel. Suthers v. Hall, state court judge Andrew Hartman denied Suthers' request, opening the door for other Colorado county clerks to begin issuing same-sex marriage licenses. On July 9 another state court judge, C. Scott Crabtree, ruled that Colorado's same-sex marriage ban was unconstitutional but stayed that decision pending appeal. On July 23 a federal court judge ruled Colorado's same-sex marriage ban unconstitutional but that decision was also stayed pending appeal. Hall's office issued 202 same-sex marriage licenses before the Colorado Supreme Court stepped in on July 29 and ordered the practice stopped until the issue was resolved on appeal.

On October 6, 2014, the U.S. Supreme Court declined to hear an appeal of the 10th Circuit's Utah case, effectively legalizing same-sex marriage in Colorado. On October 7, 2014, John Suthers ordered all Colorado county clerks to begin issuing same-sex marriage licenses.

Hall followed in the footsteps of a previous Boulder County clerk, Clela Rorex, who in 1975 had been the first county clerk in the country to issue same-sex marriage licenses. Her actions had also been opposed by the state attorney general.

== Poll watcher lawsuits ==
Ralph Shnelvar sued Hall in 2012 to have designated election watchers observe her office's handling of mail-in and other ballots. The case was settled out of court. Hall was sued again in 2014, this time by the Boulder County Republican party which claimed that Hall provided insufficient access for poll watchers to observe the clerk's counting of mail-in ballots. The suit was dismissed because insufficient notice had been given to the county attorney.
