= Colorado ex rel. Suthers v. Hall =

2014 Colorado District Court case

- No. 2014-CV-30833
- Court: Colorado Twentieth Judicial District Court
- Decided: July 10, 2014

Case history
- Subsequent actions: Case transferred, stay ordered, No. 2014-SC-582 (Colo. Sup. Ct. July 29, 2014), affirmed, No. 2014-CA-1368 (Colo. App. July 24, 2014).

Holding
- Colorado county clerks can issue marriage licenses to same-sex couples as a form of civil disobedience, despite state and U.S. district court rulings in favor of such being ordered stayed.

Court membership
- Judges sitting: Andrew Hartman, District Judge

Keywords
- Same-sex marriage; Civil disobedience

Colorado ex rel. Suthers v. Hall was a Colorado District Court case dealing with the use of civil disobedience, specifically by issuing same-sex marriage licenses to couples despite the stay of court rulings supporting them. The Court found that a county clerk was indeed allowed to engage in this practice, as the state did not meet the burden of proof to show that clerks should not be stopped from doing so. The Colorado Court of Appeals agreed; the Colorado Supreme Court stayed the clerk's actions while it waited to hear the case after October 20, 2014.

== Introduction ==
Boulder County Clerk Hillary Hall had been issuing marriage licenses to same-sex couples based on her own interpretation of Herbert v. Kitchen, a ruling by the U.S. Court of Appeals for the Tenth Circuit striking down Utah's ban on same-sex marriage and binding precedent on Colorado courts. The State of Colorado ex rel. State Attorney General John Suthers filed a motion in the Colorado District Courts in an attempt to stop the Hall's actions. As the attorney general's motion was being heard, the Seventeenth Judicial District struck down Colorado's ban on same-sex marriage as unconstitutional in Brinkman v. Long.

=== District court ruling ===
On July 10, 2014, a day after the ruling in Brinkman, the Twentieth Judicial District denied the state attorney general's motion in Colorado ex rel. Suthers. District Court Judge Andrew Hartman found that while the Boulder clerk violated the law—

There is little argument that Clerk Hall is engaging in a form of civil disobedience. She apparently is taking the position posited by St. Augustine and followed notably by Martin Luther King, Jr. that, "an unjust law is no law at all."

—he refused to impose a restraining order or injunction upon her, as the state did not meet its high burden for a stay.

Viewing the case as a procedural one, Judge Hartman applied the test set out in Rathke v. MacFarlane, 648 P.2d 648 (Colo. 1982). The judge found for the state on two of the Rathke factors: probability of success in finding that the clerk was violating current law, and certainty that an injunction would preserve the status quo. But Judge Hartman found that the other four factors outweighed this, in the clerk's favor: that no irreparable injury would occur by issuing licenses; that if marriage licenses were issued in error, the state had an adequate remedy—precedent existed in Lockyer v. San Francisco, 33 Cal. 4th 1055 (Cal. 2004)—of invalidating the licenses; that stopping the clerk would not serve the public interest as the ban had been found unconstitutional; and that a balance of the equities did not favor stopping the clerk, either, as "the law is hanging on by a thread."

=== Denial of reconsideration and stay pending appeal ===
In light of the ruling by the Colorado Supreme Court in Brinkman v. Long staying license issuance in Adams and Denver counties, the defendants also asked Judge Hartman to reconsider his ruling and stay it.

Judge Hartman denied the state's request on July 23, 2014; he dismissed the assertion that the state supreme court's stay of Brinkman is binding on Boulder County as "an improper circular argument". Judge Hartman noted that the high court relied on Judge Crabtree's preexisting stay of the Denver and Adams county cases when ruling; however, no such stay exists in the Boulder case. Judge Hartman then finds that issuing a stay is now even more difficult since the last time he performed Rathke analysis, as "chances of prevailing are rapidly fading since two subsequent rulings ... have found same sex marriage bans unconstitutional." The rulings he notes are Bishop v. Smith and Huntsman v. Heavilin.

== Court of Appeals proceedings ==
On July 21, 2014, state Attorney General Suthers appealed Judge Hartman's ruling allowing the Boulder County clerk to issue marriage licenses despite the ban.

A three-judge panel of the Colorado Court of Appeals denied the attorney general's motion to stay the Boulder County clerk's issuance of same-sex marriage licenses on appeal, Colorado v. Hall, No. 2014-CA-1368 (Colo. App. July 24, 2014). In a short opinion, the court affirmed Judge Hartman and said that the state did not meet the factors in Romero v. City of Fountain, 307 P.3d 122 (Colo. App. 2011).

== Colorado Supreme Court proceedings ==
On July 29, 2014, the Colorado Supreme Court, in an en banc order, sua sponte transferred Colorado v. Hall before it pursuant to Colorado Appellate Rule (C.A.R.) 50(b) and ordered the record filed from the Court of Appeals on or before October 20, 2014, Hall, No. 2014-SC-582. Furthermore, the court stayed Clerk Hall from issuing any more same-sex marriage licenses, pursuant to C.A.R. 8, and without other comment.

== See also ==
- Same-sex marriage in Colorado
- Recognition of same-sex unions in Colorado
- Brinkman v. Long
