= Same-sex marriage in Colorado =

Same-sex marriage has been legally recognized in Colorado since October 7, 2014. Colorado's state constitutional ban on same-sex marriage was struck down in state district court on July 9, 2014, in Brinkman v. Long, and by the U.S. District Court for the District of Colorado on July 23, 2014, in Burns v. Hickenlooper. The Tenth Circuit Court of Appeals had already made similar rulings with respect to such bans in Utah on June 25 and Oklahoma on July 18, which are binding precedents on courts in Colorado. On October 6, 2014, the U.S. Supreme Court declined to hear the cases, and the Tenth Circuit lifted its stay. On October 7, the Colorado Supreme Court and the Tenth Circuit cleared the way for same-sex marriages to begin in the state. Colorado was the 25th U.S. state to legalize same-sex marriage. Polling suggests that a large majority of Colorado residents support the legal recognition of same-sex marriage.

Colorado had previously denied marriage rights to same-sex couples by statute since 2000 and in its State Constitution since 2006. In 2024, voters repealed the state's constitutional ban on same-sex marriages by 64–36 percent. Statutes were also updated to reflect the legalization of same-sex marriage in 2025. The Colorado General Assembly had also enacted a law recognizing civil unions providing some of the rights and benefits of marriage in 2013.

== Civil unions ==
Civil unions have been legal in Colorado since May 1, 2013. Legislation to establish civil unions was passed in the Colorado Senate by 21 votes to 14 on February 11, 2013, and by the House of Representatives on March 12 in a 39–26 vote. Governor John Hickenlooper signed the bill into law on March 21, and the law took effect on May 1. Civil unions, open to both same-sex and opposite-sex couples, provide rights comparable to those enjoyed by married couples, including spousal employer benefits, presumption of paternity, adoption, next of kin rights, and inheritance, among others. However, as the federal government does not recognize civil unions, partners in a civil union cannot receive federal benefits.

== Same-sex marriage ==
=== Statutes ===
In 1996, the Colorado General Assembly passed a bill banning same-sex marriage, but it was vetoed by Governor Roy Romer. The General Assembly passed a similar bill the following year, but Romer again vetoed the legislation. Following the 1998 gubernatorial election, Governor Bill Owens signed a bill banning same-sex marriage into law in 2000. In January 2025, a bill removing all provisions in Colorado statutes that restricted marriage to "one man and one woman", thereby removing the unenforceable ban on same-sex marriage, was introduced to the General Assembly by senators Jessie Danielson and Sonya Jaquez Lewis. It passed the Senate by 29 votes to 6 on February 5, and the House of Representatives by a vote of 45 to 14 on March 25. Governor Jared Polis signed it into law on April 7, 2025.

February 5, 2025 vote in the Senate
Political affiliation	Voted for	Voted against	Absent (Did not vote)
Democratic Party	23: Judy Amabile; Matthew Ball; Jeff Bridges; James Coleman; Lisa Cutter; Jessie Danielson; Lindsey Daugherty; Tony Exum; Julie Gonzales; Nick Hinrichsen; Sonya Jaquez Lewis; Iman Jodeh; Cathy Kipp; Chris Kolker; Janice Marchman; Dafna Michaelson Jenet; Kyle Mullica; Dylan Roberts; Robert Rodriguez; Marc Snyder; Tom Sullivan; Mike Weissman; Faith Winter	–	–
Republican Party	6: John Carson; Marc Catlin; Lisa Frizell; Barbara Kirkmeyer; Paul Lundeen; Cleave Simpson	6: Mark Baisley; Scott Bright; Larry Liston; Byron Pelton; Rod Pelton; Janice Rich	–
Total	29	6	0
Total	82.9%	17.1%	0.0%

March 25, 2025 vote in the House of Representatives
Political affiliation	Voted for	Voted against	Absent (Did not vote)
Democratic Party	40: Jennifer Bacon; Shannon Bird; Andrew Boesenecker; Kyle Brown; Sean Camacho; Michael Carter; Chad Clifford; Monica Duran; Regina English; Cecelia Espenoza; Lisa Feret; Meg Froelich; Lorena Garcia; Lindsay Gilchrist; Eliza Hamrick; Jamie Jackson; Junie Joseph; Sheila Lieder; William Lindstedt; Meghan Lukens; Javier Mabrey; Bob Marshall; Matthew Martinez; Tisha Mauro; Julie McCluskie; Karen McCormick; Amy Paschal; Jacqueline Phillips; Naquetta Ricks; Manny Rutinel; Gretchen Rydin; Emily Sirota; Lesley Smith; Katie Stewart; Rebekah Stewart; Tammy Story; Brianna Titone; Elizabeth Velasco; Jenny Willford; Yara Zokaie	–	3: Mandy Lindsay; Alex Valdez; Steven Woodrow
Republican Party	5: Lori Garcia Sander; Ryan Gonzalez; Rose Pugliese; Matt Soper; Rick Taggart	14: Ryan Armagost; Carlos Barron; Scott Bottoms; Mary Bradfield; Brandi Bradley; Max Brooks; Jarvis Caldwell; Anthony Hartsook; Dusty A. Johnson; Stephanie Luck; Chris Richardson; Larry Don Suckla; Ron Weinberg; Dan Woog	3: Ken DeGraaf; Rebecca Keltie; Ty Winter
Total	45	14	6
Total	69.2%	21.5%	9.2%

Representative Brianna Titone justified the bill's necessity, "This legislation will implement the will of the voters and protect marriage equality in Colorado. As the Trump administration continues to blatantly attack and demonize the LGBTQ+ community, this bill upholds marriage equality in Colorado. With the passage of this bill, we're now one step closer to protecting the freedom to marry who we love." The definition of marriage in Colorado is now the following:

Marriage means the legally recognized union of two individuals as partners in a personal relationship. [C.R.S. § 14-15-103]

=== Constitutional amendments ===
Results of Amendment J (2024) by county: Yes 80–90% 70–80% 60–70% 50–60% / No 70–80% 60–70% 50–60%

On November 7, 2006, Colorado voters approved Amendment 43, a state-initiated constitutional amendment that prohibited the recognition of same-sex marriage in the Constitution of Colorado. The amendment passed by a margin of 56% to 44%.

Following the U.S. Supreme Court's decision in Dobbs v. Jackson Women's Health Organization, which overturned Roe v. Wade, in June 2022, some lawmakers announced they would push to codify same-sex marriage in state statutes and place a measure on the ballot to repeal the constitutional amendment banning same-sex marriage. Governor Jared Polis said he would sign such bills into law. In January 2023, Senator Danielson said, "The legislature has an obligation to do away with that ban to show the communities that we care about (them), that we're gonna stand up and protect them." A constitutional amendment requires a two-thirds majority in both chambers of the General Assembly. A ballot initiative to amend the Constitution of Colorado to remove verbiage limiting marriage to "one man and one woman", thereby removing the constitutional prohibition of same-sex marriage, was filed in July 2023. In April 2024, Senator Joann Ginal and representatives Alex Valdez and Brianna Titone introduced a constitutional amendment to the General Assembly to refer the issue to voters. The Senate approved the measure 29–5 on April 29, with six Republicans joining all Democrats in support. The House followed 46–14 on May 4, with one Democrat joining Republicans in voting against and two Republicans joining the remaining Democrats in support. The bill was signed by Governor Polis on May 8. In September 2024, a group of religious leaders expressed their support for the measure. As Amendment J, it was placed on the November 5, 2024 ballot, (Note: Voters were asked: "Shall there be an amendment to the Colorado constitution removing the ban on same-sex marriage?") and approved by 64.3% of voters and a majority of counties. Support reached 80% in four counties: Pitkin (84%), Boulder (83%), Denver (82%), and San Miguel (82%). Opposition to the amendment was highest in Cheyenne (79%), Kiowa (78%) and Baca (78%) counties.

April 29, 2024 vote in the Senate
Political affiliation	Voted for	Voted against	Absent (Did not vote)
Democratic Party	23: Jeff Bridges; Janet Buckner; James Coleman; Lisa Cutter; Jessie Danielson; Tony Exum; Steve Fenberg; Rhonda Fields; Joann Ginal; Julie Gonzales; Chris Hansen; Nick Hinrichsen; Sonya Jaquez Lewis; Chris Kolker; Janice Marchman; Dafna Michaelson Jenet; Kyle Mullica; Kevin Priola; Dylan Roberts; Robert Rodriguez; Tom Sullivan; Faith Winter; Rachel Zenzinger	–	–
Republican Party	6: Bob Gardner; Barbara Kirkmeyer; Paul Lundeen; Janice Rich; Cleave Simpson; Jim Smallwood	5: Mark Baisley; Byron Pelton; Rod Pelton; Kevin Van Winkle; Perry Will	1: Larry Liston
Total	29	5	1
Total	82.9%	14.3%	2.9%

May 4, 2024 vote in the House of Representatives
Political affiliation	Voted for	Voted against	Absent (Did not vote)
Democratic Party	44: Judy Amabile; Jennifer Bacon; Shannon Bird; Andrew Boesenecker; Kyle Brown; Chad Clifford; Monica Duran; Elisabeth Epps; Meg Froelich; Lorena Garcia; Eliza Hamrick; Tim Hernández; Leslie Herod; Iman Jodeh; Junie Joseph; Chris Kennedy; Cathy Kipp; Sheila Lieder; Mandy Lindsay; William Lindstedt; Meghan Lukens; Javier Mabrey; Bob Marshall; Matthew Martinez; Julia Marvin; Tisha Mauro; Julie McCluskie; Karen McCormick; Barbara McLachlan; David Ortiz; Jennifer Parenti; Naquetta Ricks; Manny Rutinel; Emily Sirota; Marc Snyder; Tammy Story; Brianna Titone; Alex Valdez; Elizabeth Velasco; Stephanie Vigil; Mike Weissman; Jenny Willford; Steven Woodrow; Mary Young	1: Regina English	1: Lindsey Daugherty
Republican Party	2: Matt Soper; Rick Taggart	13: Ryan Armagost; Scott Bottoms; Mary Bradfield; Brandi Bradley; Marc Catlin; Ken DeGraaf; Lisa Frizell; Anthony Hartsook; Richard Holtorf; Stephanie Luck; Mike Lynch; Don Wilson; Ty Winter	4: Rod Bockenfeld; Gabe Evans; Rose Pugliese; Ron Weinberg
Total	46	14	5
Total	70.8%	21.5%	7.7%

=== Lawsuits ===
There are five court cases dealing with same-sex marriage in Colorado. They are Brinkman v. Long, a state district court case, ruling in favor of same-sex marriage; Burns v. Hickenlooper, a U.S. district court (i.e. federal) case, ruling in favor of same-sex marriage; Kitchen v. Herbert and Bishop v. Smith, two decisions out of the Tenth Circuit Court of Appeals which affirm same-sex marriage and are binding precedent on Colorado courts, and Colorado ex rel. Suthers v. Hall, a state court case which previously allowed Boulder County to issue marriage licenses to same-sex couples.

==== Adams v. Howerton ====
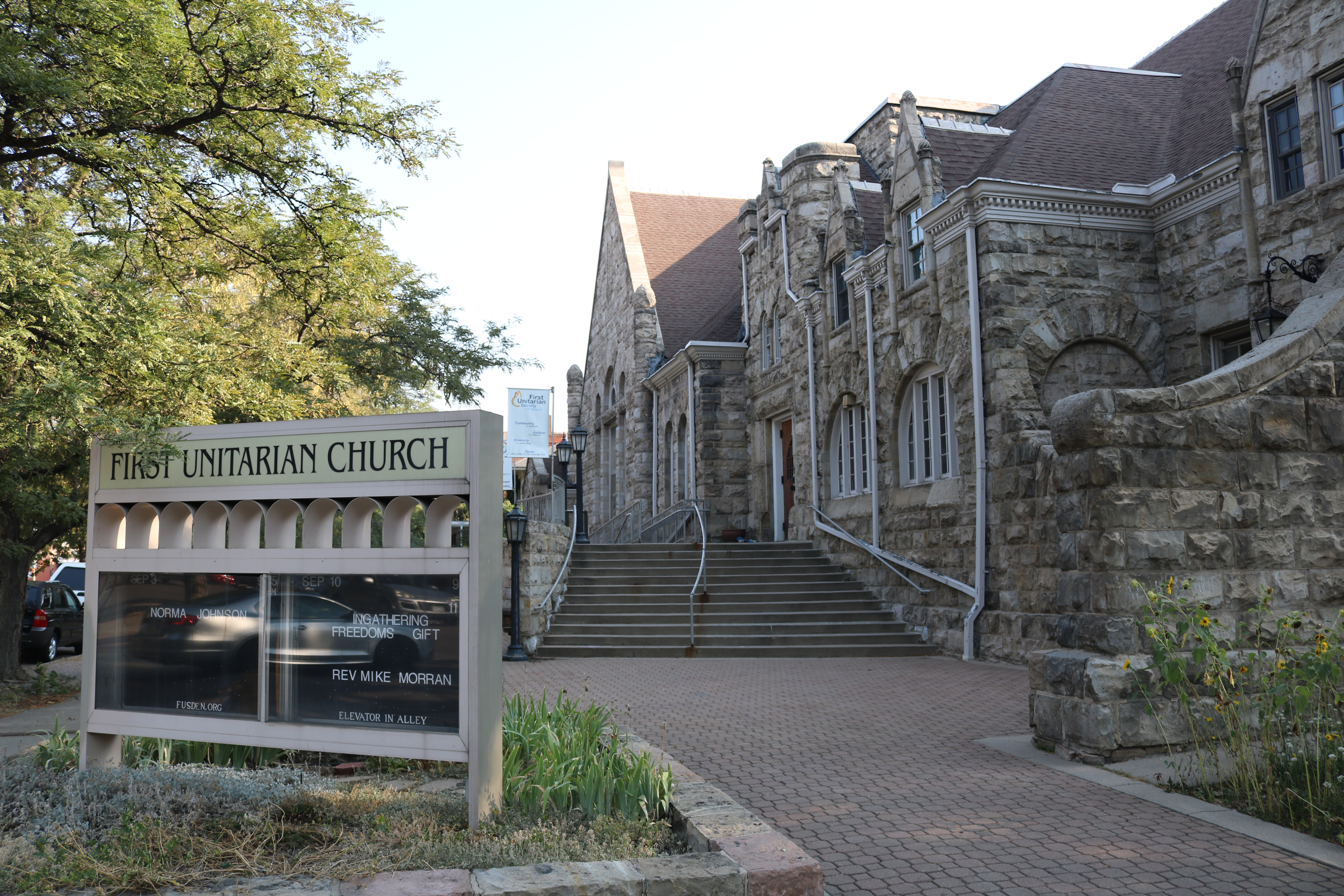
The First Unitarian Society of Denver was the location of Colorado's first religious same-sex wedding ceremony, held in 1975 following issuance of a marriage license and civil ceremony in Boulder County.

In 1975, Clela Rorex, the Boulder County Clerk, became the first county clerk in the United States to issue marriage licenses to same-sex couples. She issued marriage licenses to six same-sex couples after the local district attorney interpreted Colorado's statutes, which used the phrase "any two persons", to be gender-neutral with respect to marriage. Attorney General J.D. MacFarlane issued a contrary opinion that those marriages were invalid, and the licenses were revoked. Dave McCord and Dave Zamora were the first couple to receive a marriage license in Boulder on March 26, 1975. When one of those married in Boulder, Richard Adams, tried to use his license to sponsor his husband, Australian national Anthony Sullivan, for immigration purposes, he lost his case, Adams v. Howerton, in federal court. In 2016, U.S. Citizenship and Immigration Services granted permanent residency status to Sullivan, based on his marriage to Adams in Boulder on April 21, 1975. In December 2024, U.S. Secretary of the Interior Deb Haaland announced that the Boulder County Courthouse had been designated a National Historic Landmark for being the first site in the United States to issue marriage licenses to same-sex couples.

==== Brinkman v. Long ====
After being denied a marriage license, a lesbian couple filed a lawsuit on October 30, 2013, in state district court. The case, Brinkman v. Long, sought to overturn the state's constitutional ban on same-sex marriage. The couple was joined by nine other same-sex couples who filed a lawsuit, McDaniel-Miccio v. Hickenlooper, also in state district court, seeking the same outcome. The suit named Governor John Hickenlooper and a city clerk responsible for licensing marriages as defendants. Attorney General John Suthers announced he would defend the state's ban. Brinkman and McDaniel-Miccio were combined for oral arguments in state district court. On July 9, 2014, District Court Judge C. Scott Crabtree ruled that Colorado's same-sex marriage ban violated the plaintiffs' guarantees of equal protection and due process under the Fourteenth Amendment to the U.S. Constitution, stating: "No state since United States v. Windsor has been able to justify its ban under even the rational basis test, much less under the strict scrutiny test." The judge stayed his ruling pending the outcome of appeals.

Judge Hartman's decision in Colorado ex rel. Suthers v. Hall provided legal cover for the Boulder County clerk to issue same-sex marriage licenses as a form of civil disobedience. After Hartman's decision was handed down, the Denver and Pueblo county clerks began issuing licenses to couples regardless of gender as well, despite Judge Crabtree's stay. When asked to enjoin the Denver County clerk from issuing licenses to same-sex couples, Judge Crabtree refused to take action. On July 14, 2014, Attorney General Suthers appealed Judge Crabtree's inaction to the Colorado Supreme Court. In a separate filing, and seeking a reversal of Judge Hartman's ruling, Suthers also asked the high court for an emergency injunction to stop all state clerks from issuing licenses. On July 18, 2014, the Colorado Supreme Court ordered clerks in Adams and Denver counties to stop issuing marriage licenses. The Supreme Court was scheduled to hear oral arguments regarding the merits of the state's same-sex marriage ban on September 30, 2014.

==== Burns v. Hickenlooper ====
Same-sex marriage in the United States

Burns v. Hickenlooper was a same-sex marriage case filed on July 1, 2014, in the U.S. District Court for the District of Colorado. The plaintiffs were six same-sex couples who had been legally married in another state but whose marriage Colorado did not legally recognize or who had been refused a Colorado marriage license. The main defendants, Governor Hickenlooper and Attorney General Suthers, agreed with the plaintiffs insofar as having the court issue an injunction declaring the same-sex marriage ban unconstitutional, but they wanted a stay and swift resolution by the U.S. Supreme Court in order to avoid costly litigation.

U.S. District Judge Raymond P. Moore found in favor of the plaintiffs in Burns on July 23, 2014, granting their motion for a preliminary injunction. In his ruling, Judge Moore noticed a split among the state defendants even though they agreed with the plaintiffs' motion: "Defendant Attorney General believed Kitchen [v. Herbert] was incorrect while Defendant Governor believed Kitchen was correctly decided. ... Nevertheless, the defendants collectively did not oppose the entry of a preliminary injunction, but also asked that the injunction, as well as further proceedings in this matter, be stayed." After finding that the plaintiffs met their burden for an injunction, he rejected the defendants' request for a stay. Immediately after Judge Moore's order was issued, state defendants filed a notice of appeal and asked the Tenth Circuit Court of Appeals for a stay. The appeals court granted the stay on August 21, 2014. When the U.S. Supreme Court dismissed requests to hear appeals from similar cases from the Tenth Circuit on October 6, Attorney General Suthers asked the Tenth Circuit to lift the stay in this case as well, which would allow the district court's order that Colorado recognize same-sex marriages to take effect. On October 7, the Colorado Supreme Court removed the legal obstacles preventing Colorado's county clerks from issuing marriage licenses to same-sex couples, legalizing same-sex marriage in the state.

==== Colorado ex rel. Suthers v. Hall ====
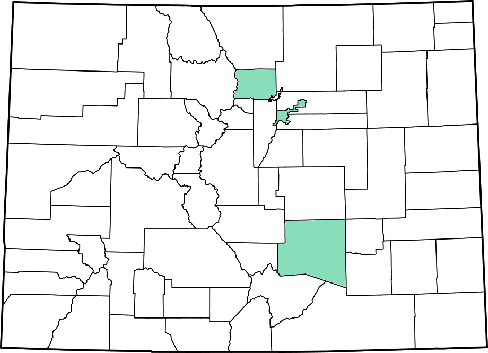
Counties in Colorado that issued licenses to same-sex couples in response to Kitchen v. Herbert or Colorado ex rel. Suthers v. Hall. County issued marriage licenses to same-sex couples County did not issue marriage licenses to same-sex couples

Hillary Hall, the Boulder County Clerk, had been issuing licenses based on her own interpretation of the Tenth Circuit ruling in Kitchen soon after that ruling was handed down. Attorney General Suthers filed a motion in state district court in an attempt to stay the clerk's actions. However, on July 10, 2014, a day after the Brinkman ruling, District Court Judge Andrew Hartman found that while Hall violated the law—"There is little argument that Clerk Hall is engaging in a form of civil disobedience. She apparently is taking the position posited by St. Augustine and followed notably by Martin Luther King Jr. that, 'an unjust law is no law at all.'"—but he refused to impose a restraining order or injunction upon her, as the state did not meet its high burden for a stay. On July 21, 2014, Suthers appealed the ruling; in light of the ruling by the Colorado Supreme Court staying license issuance in Adams and Denver counties, he also asked Judge Hartman to reconsider his ruling and stay it. Judge Hartman denied the state's request on July 23. The next day, a three-judge panel of the Colorado Court of Appeals again denied the Attorney General's motion. The Colorado Supreme Court, sua sponte on July 29, decided to hear the case and ordered it transferred and requested the record on appeal to be filed before it by October 20, 2014. The Supreme Court stayed Hall from issuing same-sex marriage licenses in the meantime.

==== Kitchen v. Herbert ====
On June 25, 2014, the Tenth Circuit Court of Appeals ruled in Kitchen v. Herbert that Utah's ban on same-sex marriage violated the U.S. Constitution. The ruling in Kitchen is binding on courts in every state within the Circuit, including Colorado. Since the Tenth Circuit stayed implementation of its ruling pending review by the U.S. Supreme Court, courts in Colorado had to follow the precedent that Kitchen set and stay subsequent rulings pending the expiration of that stay. Immediately following the decision in Kitchen, the Boulder County clerk began issuing marriage licenses despite the stay. After a state district court refused to stop the clerk in Colorado ex rel. Suthers v. Hall, Denver and Pueblo counties began issuing marriage licenses to same-sex couples as well. All Colorado counties stopped issuing marriage licenses following stays issued by the Colorado Supreme Court. When the U.S. Supreme Court dismissed requests to hear an appeal of the Kitchen case on October 6, Attorney General Suthers asked the Tenth Circuit to lift the stay in this case as it related to Colorado, which would allow the district court's order that Colorado recognize same-sex marriages to take effect. On October 7, the Colorado Supreme Court removed the legal obstacles preventing Colorado's county clerks from issuing marriage licenses to same-sex couples, legalizing same-sex marriage in the state.

==== Common-law marriage cases ====
Colorado is one of a small number of states that recognizes common-law marriages. Common-law couples are considered legally married without having registered their relationship as a marriage with the state. Parties in a common-law marriage are entitled to all the rights, privileges and responsibilities of a legal and binding marriage. Common-law marriages have been recognized in Colorado since 1887, and in 1987 the Colorado Supreme Court set out the requirements for the existence of a common-law marriage in People v. Lucero. The decision held that couples' conduct, including cohabitation or taking the partner's surname, as well as their reputation in the community, were "factors that most clearly show an intention to be married". State courts have dealt with two same-sex common-law marriages cases in the years following the U.S. Supreme Court's ruling in Obergefell v. Hodges.

Dean LaFleur and Timothy Pyfer held a commitment ceremony with family and friends in 2003. After the couple separated, Pyfer filed to dissolve the marriage in January 2018. LaFleur argued that he did not mutually agree to enter into a common-law marriage. A Jefferson County District Court judge ruled In re Marriage of LaFleur and Pyfer that the couple were common-law married. The court awarded $50,000 of LaFleur's retirement to Pyfer and ordered spousal maintenance. Both parties appealed. On January 11, 2021, the Colorado Supreme Court upheld the marriage of LaFleur and Pyfer, and ruled that, pursuant to the U.S. Supreme Court's decision in Obergefell, same-sex couples must be allowed to enter into common-law marriages and the state must retroactively recognize common-law marriages of same-sex couples that had occurred prior to the legalization of same-sex marriage in 2014. On the issue of division of property and spousal maintenance, the justices sent the case back to the Jefferson County District Court, ordering further review.

Edi Hogsett and Marcia Neale, a couple for thirteen years, separated in January 2015. Hogsett believed the parties were common-law married and petitioned for a dissolution of marriage in Arapahoe County District Court. Neale disagreed and moved to dismiss the petition. A district court judge ruled In re Marriage of Hogsett and Neale that the couple had not formed a common-law marriage, the Lucero text factors were outdated and granted Neale's motion to dismiss. The Colorado Court of Appeals agreed in December 2018 with the lower court's finding, and noted that pursuant to Obergefell the Lucero factors should be updated. On January 11, 2021, the Colorado Supreme Court agreed. The court noted that the test factors should be applied flexibly to the facts of each case, explaining that same-sex couples may not be fully open about their relationships due to fears of discrimination and may therefore only share them within a close community. It further observed that, prior to the legalization of same-sex marriage, such couples could not file joint taxes or identify as married on government forms.

=== Developments after legalization ===
On February 3, 2020, four Republican lawmakers introduced a bill to the General Assembly to ban same-sex marriage. Republican leaders quickly distanced themselves from the proposal. Rob Witwer, a member of the House of Representatives between 2005 and 2009, said in an interview, "It's a needless provocation and a waste of people's time. The only thing it serves to do is polarize people over an issue that's by-and-large been settled and that public opinion polls show people have accepted." House Minority Leader Patrick Neville said he was unaware of the bill and "hadn't given much thought to the idea of banning gay marriage". Leslie Herod, a member of the Democratic Party, said, "I'll be damned if this bill, these bills, try to take away the rights of my family, the rights of my friends, and the rights of my community, period." The measure was voted down in a marathon hearing in a House committee that stretched into the early hours of February 15, 2020.

On September 15, 2021, Governor Jared Polis married his longtime partner Marlon Reis in a small Jewish ceremony in Boulder. Polis became the first U.S. governor to marry a person of the same sex.

=== Native American nations ===
The Indian Civil Rights Act primarily aims to protect the rights of Native Americans but also reinforces the principle of tribal self-governance. While it does not grant sovereignty, the Act affirms the authority of tribes to govern their own legal affairs. Consequently, many tribes have enacted their own marriage and family laws. As a result, the Burns ruling and the Supreme Court's Obergefell ruling did not automatically apply to tribal jurisdictions. Colorado is home to two Native American tribes: the Southern Ute Indian Tribe and the Ute Mountain Ute Tribe. Same-sex marriages are performed in the latter under federal law. The Bureau of Indian Affairs operates courts established throughout the U.S. under the Code of Federal Regulations (CFR), and "until such time as a particular Indian tribe establishes their own tribal court, the Court of Indian Offenses will act as a tribe's judicial system". Same-sex marriages for Ute Mountain Ute tribal members can thus be performed in these federal CFR courts. The Southern Ute Indian Tribe is not under the jurisdiction of the CFR courts; however, it is unknown if same-sex marriage is legal on its reservation as the tribe has not publicly commented on the issue or published its tribal code.

Native Americans have deep-rooted marriage traditions, placing a strong emphasis on community, family and spiritual connections. Traditional Ute marriages (piyarüvaani) were arranged, exogamous and mostly monogamous, though polygyny was occasionally practiced. While there are no records of same-sex marriages being performed in Native American cultures in the way they are commonly defined in Western legal systems, many Indigenous communities recognize identities and relationships that may be placed on the LGBT spectrum. Among these are two-spirit individuals—people who embody both masculine and feminine qualities. In some cultures, two-spirit individuals assigned male at birth wear women's clothing and engage in household and artistic work associated with the feminine sphere. Historically, this identity sometimes allowed for unions between two people of the same biological sex. The Ute refer to two-spirit individuals as tuwasawich (pronounced [tuˈwasawitʃ]). Traditionally, they could marry men or women, while some remained unmarried.

=== Demographics and marriage statistics ===
Data from the 2000 U.S. census showed that 10,045 same-sex couples were living in Colorado. By 2005, this had increased to 15,915 couples, likely attributed to same-sex couples' growing willingness to disclose their partnerships on government surveys. Same-sex couples lived in all counties of the state, except Cheyenne and Hinsdale, and constituted 1.1% of coupled households and 0.6% of all households in the state. Most couples lived in Denver, Jefferson and Arapahoe counties, and the counties with the highest percentage of same-sex couples were Denver (1.22% of all county households) and Gilpin (1.13%). Same-sex partners in Colorado were on average younger than opposite-sex partners, and more likely to be employed. In addition, the average and median household incomes of same-sex couples were higher than different-sex couples, but same-sex couples were far less likely to own a home than opposite-sex partners. 14% of same-sex couples in Colorado were raising children under the age of 18, with an estimated 4,091 children living in households headed by same-sex couples in 2005.

The 2020 U.S. census showed that there were 14,148 married same-sex couple households (5,978 male couples and 8,170 female couples) and 10,414 unmarried same-sex couple households in Colorado.

== Public opinion ==
Public opinion for same-sex marriage in Colorado
Poll source	Dates administered	Sample size	Margin of error	Support	Opposition	Do not know / refused
Public Religion Research Institute	February 28 – December 8, 2025	330 adults	?	70%	28%	2%
Public Religion Research Institute	March 13 – December 2, 2024	539 adults	?	70%	28%	2%
Public Religion Research Institute	March 9 – December 7, 2023	543 adults	?	72%	28%	<0.5%
Public Religion Research Institute	March 11 – December 14, 2022	?	?	74%	24%	2%
Public Religion Research Institute	March 8 – November 9, 2021	?	?	77%	23%	<0.5%
Public Religion Research Institute	January 7 – December 20, 2020	991 adults	?	79%	19%	2%
Public Religion Research Institute	April 5 – December 23, 2017	1,210 adults	?	71%	21%	8%
Public Religion Research Institute	May 18, 2016 – January 10, 2017	1,657 adults	?	64%	27%	9%
Public Religion Research Institute	April 29, 2015 – January 7, 2016	1,346 adults	?	65%	27%	8%
Public Policy Polling	October 16–19, 2014	778 likely voters	± 3.5%	54%	39%	7%
New York Times/CBS News/YouGov	September 20 – October 1, 2014	1,634 likely voters	± 2.9%	54%	35%	11%
Public Policy Polling	July 17–20, 2014	653 voters	± 3.8%	55%	38%	7%
Public Religion Research Institute	April 2, 2014 – January 4, 2015	927 adults	?	60%	32%	8%
Quinnipiac University	April 15–21, 2014	1,298 registered voters	± 2.7%	61%	33%	6%
Public Policy Polling	March 13–16, 2014	568 registered voters	± 4.1%	56%	36%	8%
Public Policy Polling	December 3–4, 2013	928 voters	± 3.2%	53%	38%	9%
Public Policy Polling	April 5–7, 2012	542 voters	± 4.2%	53%	40%	7%
Public Policy Polling	December 1–4, 2011	793 voters	± 3.5%	47%	43%	10%
Public Policy Polling	August 4–7, 2011	510 voters	± 4.3%	45%	45%	10%

== See also ==
- LGBT rights in Colorado
- Recognition of same-sex unions in Colorado
- Same-sex marriage in the United States
