= Clela Rorex =

American county clerk (1943–2022)

Boulder County Clerk
- In office 1975–1977
- Preceded by: Henry Putnam

Personal details
- Born: July 23, 1943 Denver, Colorado, U.S.
- Died: June 19, 2022 (aged 78) Longmont, Colorado, U.S.
- Party: Democratic
- Children: 3
- Education: University of Colorado Boulder; University of Denver
- Known for: Issuing the first same-sex marriage license to a gay couple in the United States

Clela Ann Rorex (July 23, 1943 – June 19, 2022) was an American county clerk who issued the first same-sex marriage license in the United States. Serving as the Boulder County Clerk, Rorex issued a marriage license to a gay couple in 1975 after receiving approval from the District Attorney. In December 2024, the building where Rorex issued the license was declared a national historic landmark.

== Early life ==
Clela Rorex was born in Denver on July 23, 1943, and raised in Steamboat Springs, Colorado. She was adopted at an early age by Ruby and Cecil Rorex who was the county clerk for Routt County, Colorado, for 30 years.

== Education and early career ==
Rorex attended the University of Colorado Boulder on a Methodist scholarship and earned a bachelor's degree. She later earned a second degree in legal administration from the University of Denver. She then married a naval officer and spent three years with him while he was stationed at Guantanamo Bay, Cuba, before returning to Boulder.

After working a few summers in her father's office, Rorex decided to run for county clerk of Boulder County, Colorado, when the incumbent, Henry Putnam, announced his retirement. She decided to run after attending a meeting in which members of the Democratic Party stated that they "needed a man" to run against the female Republican candidate. Rorex shared her frustrations over hearing this with women in a feminist group she was a member of, and decided that she would run for clerk. She was elected in 1975, at age 31. Henry Putnam subsequently refused to vacate the Clerk's office or provide Rorex with the keys to the office safe; he was removed by law enforcement, who had to summon a locksmith.

== Same-sex marriage licenses ==
Rorex had been clerk for three months when two men, Dave McCord and Dave Zamora, came to the clerk's office to apply for a marriage license. They had originally applied in Colorado Springs, where they were told to go to Boulder; El Paso County did not do "that type of thing."

After Rorex inquired into the legality of issuing the license, District Attorney Alex Hunter and first assistant DA Bill Wise wrote an opinion stating that Colorado law did not specify whether marriage must be between a man and a woman. Rorex was told it was within her legal right to decide if she wanted to issue the license or not. Rorex issued the license on March 26, 1975. She issued five more same-sex marriage licenses in Boulder before the Colorado Attorney General ordered her to stop. She received hate mail and angry phone calls, and local Roswell "Ros" Howard showed up at the courthouse with his horse Dolly to request a license to marry his horse; Rorex said she declined his request on the basis that, at eight years old, Dolly was underage, and could not marry without written consent from her parents. When interviewed in 2014, Rorex stated that Howard — an "old media hack" — had "loved" this outcome, and that he subsequently began propositioning her.

The Boulder County Courthouse was added to the National Register of Historic Places in part because of the marriage licenses Rorex issued. In 2012, a photocollage was put on display at the Courthouse, commemorating 150 years since the founding of Boulder County; although the collage initially included an image of Howard and Dolly, in June 2018, this was replaced by a photo of Rorex.

== Backlash ==
Rorex resigned from office about two and a half years into her term. She married a man and moved to California. Rorex never held elected office again.

== Later career ==
Rorex returned to Colorado after her marriage and obtained a degree in legal administration from the University of Denver. She worked as a legal administrator for the Native American Rights Fund in Boulder for 18 years. After retiring around 2011, she spoke at public schools on panels composed of people of different gender identities. She considered herself an "ally for gay rights and marriage equality".

== Personal life and death ==
Rorex was married and divorced three times and had three children. She died on June 19, 2022, at the age of 78 at a hospice care facility in Longmont, Colorado, from complications of an infection following surgery.

== See also ==
- Hillary Hall—21st century Boulder County clerk known for issuing marriage licenses to same-sex couples
