= Brinkman v. Long =

- No. 2013-CV-32572
- Court: Colorado Seventeenth Judicial District Court
- Decided: July 9, 2014

Case history
- Prior actions: Motion to consolidate with McDaniel-Miccio v. Hickenlooper, No. 14-CV-30731, granted, Order of Colo. Chief Justice (May 8, 2014).

Holding
- Colorado's ban on same-sex marriage violates plaintiffs' guarantees of Due Process and Equal Protection under the Fourteenth Amendment to the U.S. Constitution.

Court membership
- Judges sitting: C. Scott Crabtree, District Judge

Keywords
- Same-sex marriage

Brinkman v. Long, and its companion case, McDaniel-Miccio v. Hickenlooper, are the lead state court cases on same-sex marriage in Colorado. Here, a Colorado district court found on July 9, 2014, that the state's same-sex marriage ban violates same-sex couples' guarantees of equal protection and due process under the Fourteenth Amendment to the United States Constitution. Brinkman and McDaniel-Miccio have been appealed to the Colorado Supreme Court, where they were dismissed following the dismissal of similar petitions by the U.S. Supreme Court on October 6, 2014.

== Introduction ==
After being denied a marriage license, a lesbian couple filed a lawsuit on October 30, 2013, in the Seventeenth Judicial District. The case, Brinkman v. Long, seeks to overturn the state's constitutional ban on same-sex marriage. The couple was joined on February 18, 2014, by nine other same-sex couples who filed a lawsuit, McDaniel-Miccio v. Hickenlooper, also in state district court, seeking the same outcome. Four of the couples are raising children, and five of the couples have married in other states. The suit named Governor John Hickenlooper and Denver City Clerk Debra Johnson as defendants. Hickenlooper responded by noting Colorado's support for civil unions. Johnson said she supported marriage rights for same-sex couples but was obligated to follow the law by denying them marriage licenses. Colorado Attorney General John Suthers, a Republican, announced he would defend the state's ban.

== District Court proceedings ==
Brinkman and McDaniel-Miccio were combined for argument in state district court. Written motions for summary judgment were submitted by May 2, 2014. A court hearing was held on June 16, 2014, in Adams County before state District Judge C. Scott Crabtree, who was reported to be skeptical about the state's position.

=== Ruling ===
On July 9, 2014, Judge Crabtree ruled that Colorado's same-sex marriage ban violated the plaintiffs' guarantees of equal protection and due process under the Fourteenth Amendment to the U.S. Constitution:

No state since U.S. v. Windsor has been able to justify its ban under even the rational basis test, much less under the strict scrutiny test.

The judge also noted that because Colorado's civil unions deny same-sex couples federal benefits provided to different-sex couples, "[t]he existence of civil unions [in Colorado] is further evidence of discrimination against same-sex couples and does not ameliorate the discriminatory effect of the Marriage Bans." This argument that civil unions are inherently inferior to marriage had been used successfully before—in Kerrigan v. Commissioner of Public Health, the case that recognized same-sex marriage in Connecticut, a decision which Judge Crabtree references; and in Garden State Equality v. Dow, the New Jersey case that led to marriage equality there. The judge stayed his ruling pending the outcome of appeals.

=== Effect of Colorado ex rel. Suthers ===
Colorado District Judge Andrew Hartman's decision in Colorado ex rel. Suthers v. Hall provided legal cover for the Boulder County clerk to issue same-sex marriage licenses as a form of civil disobedience. After Hartman's decision was handed down, the Denver County and Pueblo County clerks began issuing licenses to couples regardless of gender as well, despite Judge Crabtree's stay. When asked to enjoin the Denver County clerk from issuing licenses to same-sex couples, Judge Crabtree refused to take action. On July 14, 2014, Colorado Attorney General Suthers appealed Judge Crabtree's inaction to the Colorado Supreme Court. In a separate filing, and seeking a reversal of Judge Hartman's ruling, the state attorney general also asked the high court for an emergency injunction to stop all state clerks from issuing licenses.

== Colorado Supreme Court proceedings ==
In a July 18, 2014, unanimous order issued en banc, the Colorado Supreme Court rejected the attorney general's request for an emergency injunction—one which would have a statewide effect. However, in light of the previous stay entered by Judge Crabtree but thereafter left unenforced, the Colorado Supreme Court ordered clerks in Adams and Denver counties to stop issuing licenses pursuant to Colorado Appellate Rule 8. That rule grants the high court power to issue a stay where "the trial court ... has failed to afford the relief which the applicant requested", Brinkman v. Colorado, No. 2014-SA-212.

On October 6, the U.S. Supreme Court issued orders declining to hear appeals from decisions of the United States Court of Appeals for the Tenth Circuit, which includes Colorado, in Kitchen v. Herbert (Utah) and Bishop v. United States (Oklahoma), which found state bans on same-sex marriage unconstitutional. On October 7, the Colorado Supreme Court lifted its injunction and dismissed the appeal in this case.

== See also ==
- LGBT rights in Colorado
- Recognition of same-sex unions in Colorado
- Same-sex marriage in Colorado
- Same-sex marriage in the United States
