= Same-sex marriage in the United States =

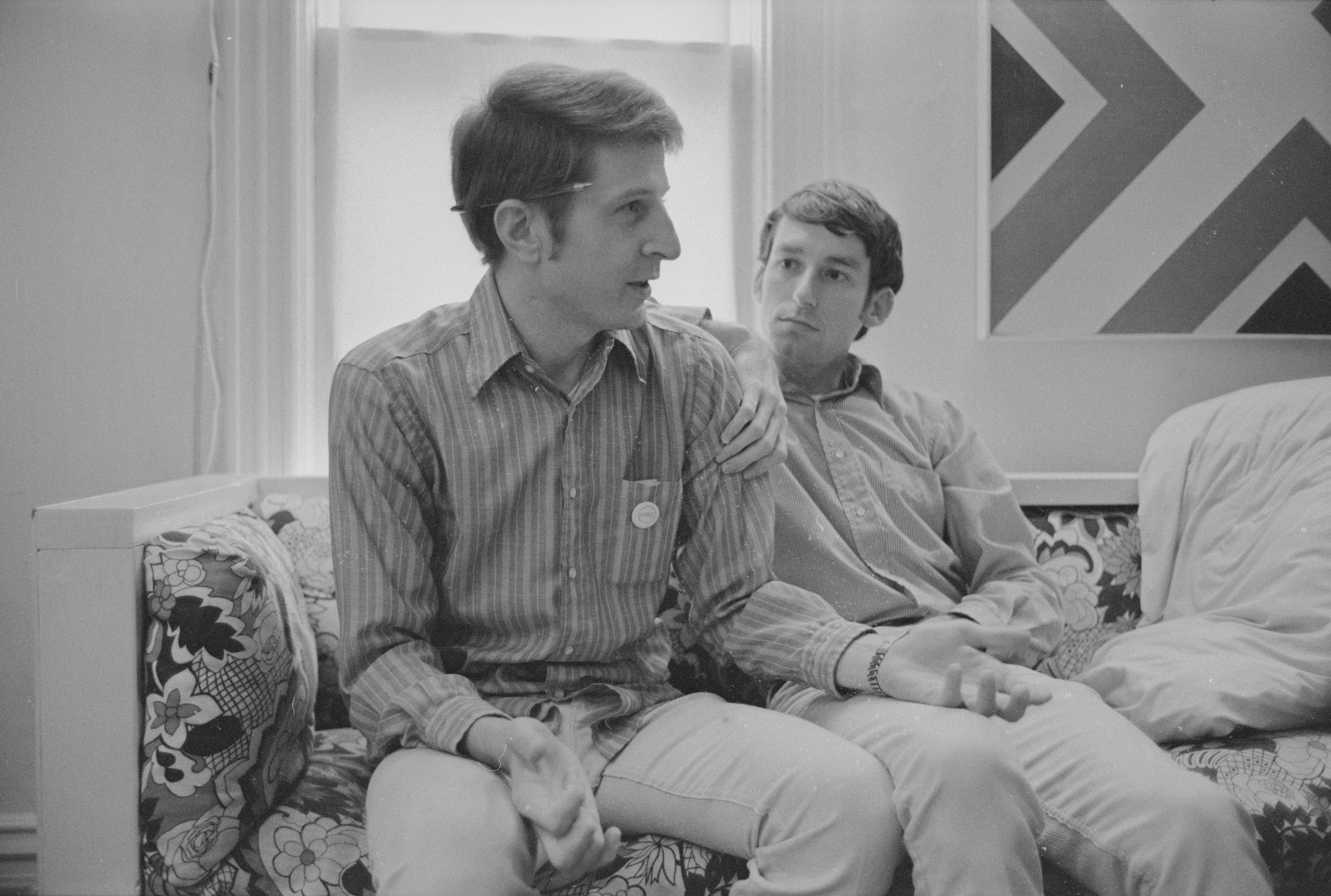
Jack Baker and Michael McConnell (r), the first same-sex couple married in the United States (in 1971), at their Minneapolis home, 1970

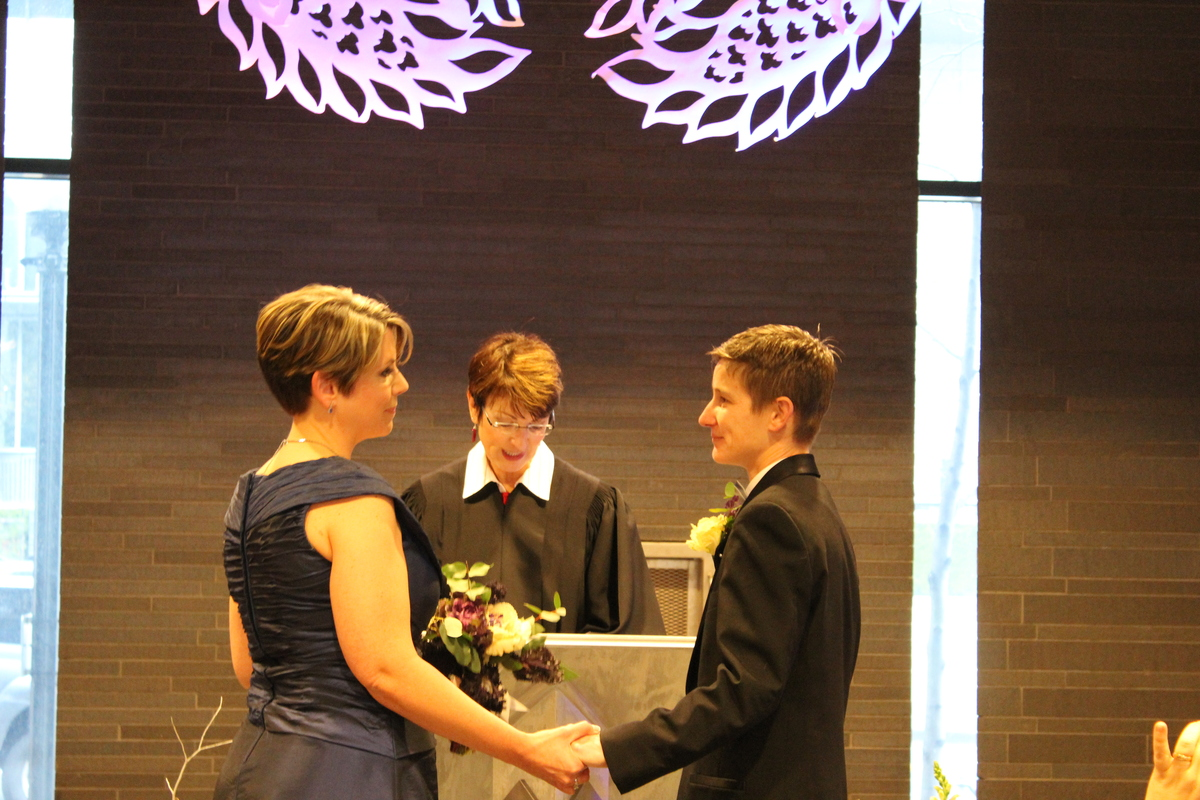
One of the first same-sex weddings performed at Seattle City Hall after the passage of the Washington State Marriage Equality Act. in December 2012 between two women

The legal recognition of same-sex marriage in the United States expanded from one state in 2004 (Massachusetts) to all 50 states in 2015 through various court rulings, state legislation, and direct popular vote. States have separate marriage laws, which must adhere to rulings by the Supreme Court of the United States that recognize marriage as a fundamental right guaranteed by both the Due Process Clause and the Equal Protection Clause of the Fourteenth Amendment to the United States Constitution, as first established in the 1967 landmark civil rights case of Loving v. Virginia. Same-sex marriages are also licensed in and recognized by Washington, D.C.

Civil rights campaigning in support of marriage without distinction as to sex or sexual orientation began in the 1970s. In 1972, the later-overturned Baker v. Nelson saw the Supreme Court of the United States decline to become involved. The issue became prominent from around 1993, when the Supreme Court of Hawaii ruled in Baehr v. Lewin that it was unconstitutional under the Constitution of Hawaii for the state to abridge marriage on the basis of sex. That ruling led to federal and state actions to explicitly abridge marriage on the basis of sex in order to prevent the marriages of same-sex couples from being recognized by law, the most prominent of which was the 1996 federal Defense of Marriage Act (DOMA). In 2003, the Massachusetts Supreme Judicial Court ruled in Goodridge v. Department of Public Health that it was unconstitutional under the Constitution of Massachusetts for the state to abridge marriage on the basis of sex. From 2004 through to 2015, as the tide of public opinion continued to move towards support of same-sex marriage, various state court rulings, state legislation, direct popular votes (referendums and initiatives), and federal court rulings established same-sex marriage in thirty-six of the fifty states.

The most prominent supporters of same-sex marriage are human rights and civil rights organizations, while the most prominent opponents are religious groups, though some religious organizations support marriage equality. The first two decades of the 21st century saw same-sex marriage receive support from prominent figures in the civil rights movement, including Coretta Scott King, John Lewis, Julian Bond, Jesse Jackson, and Mildred Loving. In May 2012, the NAACP, the leading African-American civil rights organization, declared its support for same-sex marriage and stated that it is a civil right.

In June 2013, the Supreme Court of the United States struck down DOMA for violating the Fifth Amendment to the United States Constitution in the landmark civil rights case of United States v. Windsor, leading to federal recognition of same-sex marriage, with federal benefits for married couples connected to either the state of residence or the state in which the marriage was solemnized. In June 2015, the Supreme Court ruled in the landmark civil rights case of Obergefell v. Hodges that the fundamental right of same-sex couples to marry on the same terms and conditions as opposite-sex couples, with all the accompanying rights and responsibilities, is guaranteed by both the Due Process Clause and the Equal Protection Clause of the Fourteenth Amendment to the United States Constitution. On December 13, 2022, DOMA was repealed and replaced by the Respect for Marriage Act, which recognizes and protects same-sex and interracial marriages under federal law and in interstate relations.

Gallup found that nationwide public support for same-sex marriage reached 50% in 2011, 60% in 2015, and 70% in 2021.

A study of nationwide data from January 1999 to December 2015 revealed that the establishment of same-sex marriage is associated with a significant reduction in the rate of attempted suicide among teens, with the effect being concentrated among teens of a minority sexual orientation, resulting in approximately 134,000 fewer teens attempting suicide each year in the United States.

== History ==
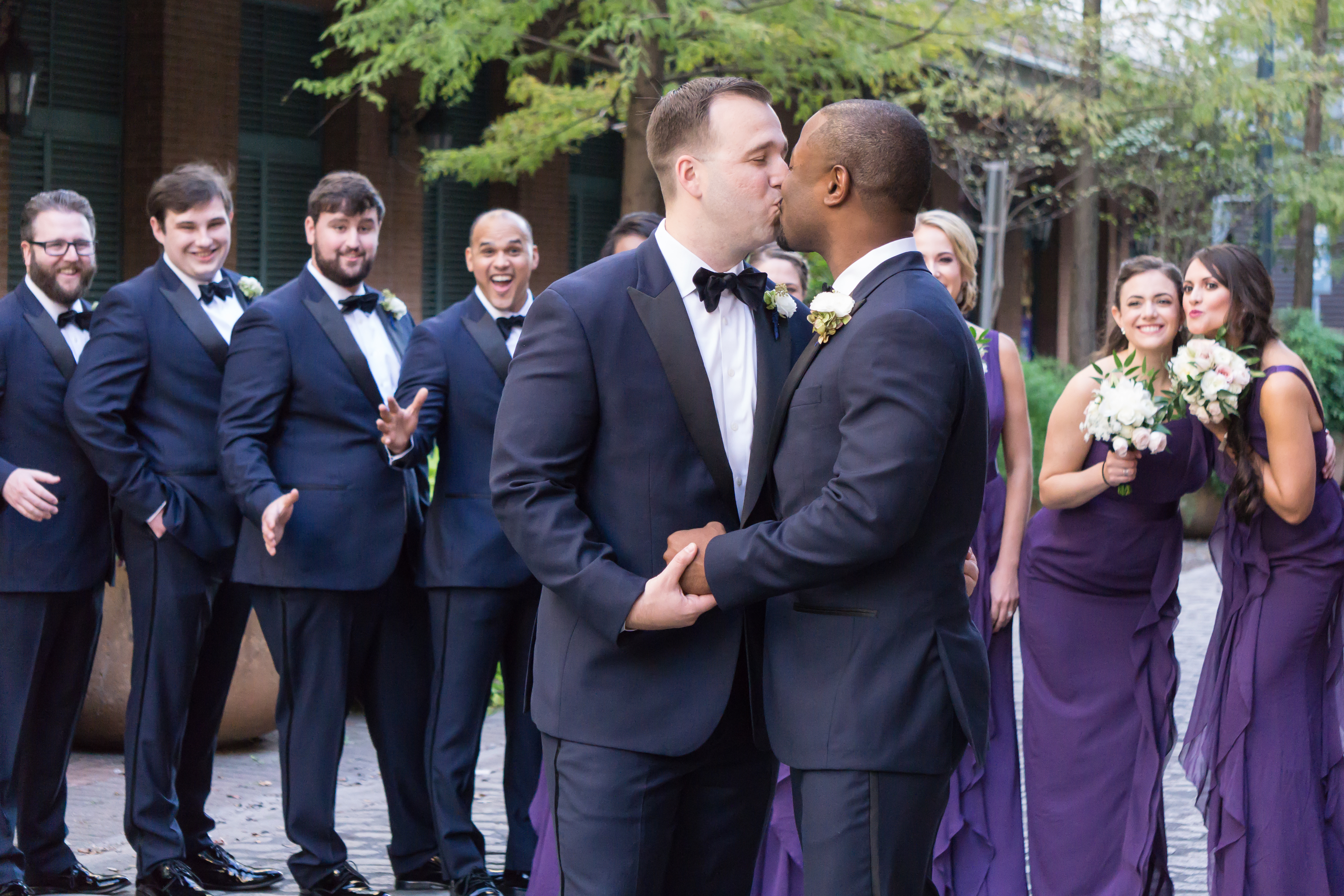
A newlywed same-sex couple celebrate their marriage in New Orleans in 2017.

The history of same-sex marriage in the United States dates from the early 1970s, when the first lawsuits seeking legal recognition of same-sex relationships brought the question of civil marriage rights and benefits for same-sex couples to public attention, though they proved unsuccessful. The subject became increasingly prominent in U.S. politics following the 1993 Hawaii Supreme Court decision in Baehr v. Miike that suggested the possibility that the state's prohibition might be unconstitutional. That decision was met by actions at both the federal and state level to restrict marriage to male-female couples, notably the enactment at the federal level of the Defense of Marriage Act (DOMA).

On May 17, 2004, Massachusetts became the first U.S. state and the sixth jurisdiction in the world to legalize same-sex marriage following the Supreme Judicial Court's decision in Goodridge v. Department of Public Health six months earlier. Just as with the Hawaii decision, the legalization of same-sex marriage in Massachusetts provoked a reaction from opponents that resulted in further legal restrictions being written into state statutes and constitutions. On August 4, 2004, a Washington jurist became the first trial judge in the nation to rule a state defense of marriage act unconstitutional in Andersen v. King County; the King County Superior Court ruling was narrowly overturned on appeal in 2006. The movement to obtain marriage rights for same-sex couples expanded steadily from that time until, in late 2014, lawsuits had been brought in every state that still denied marriage licenses to same-sex couples.

By late 2014, same-sex marriage had become legal in states that contained more than 70% of the United States population. In some jurisdictions, legalization came through the action of state courts or the enactment of state legislation. More frequently, it came as the result of the decisions of federal courts. On November 6, 2012, Maine, Maryland, and Washington became the first states to legalize same-sex marriage through popular vote. Same-sex marriage had been legalized in the District of Columbia and 21 Native American tribal nations as well.

The June 2013 decision of the U.S. Supreme Court in United States v. Windsor striking down the law barring federal recognition of same-sex marriage gave significant impetus to the progress of lawsuits that challenged state bans on same-sex marriage in federal court. Since that decision, with only a few exceptions, U.S. District Courts and Courts of Appeals have found state bans on same-sex marriage unconstitutional, as have several state courts. The exceptions have been a state court in Tennessee, U.S. district courts in Louisiana and Puerto Rico, and the U.S. Court of Appeals for the Sixth Circuit. The U.S. Supreme Court agreed to hear appeals from that circuit's decision.

On June 26, 2015, the U.S. Supreme Court struck down all state bans on same-sex marriage, legalized it in all fifty states, and required states to honor out-of-state same-sex marriage licenses in the case Obergefell v. Hodges. The United States was the seventeenth country in the world and the second in North America after Canada, to allow same-sex couples to marry nationwide.

== Legal issues ==
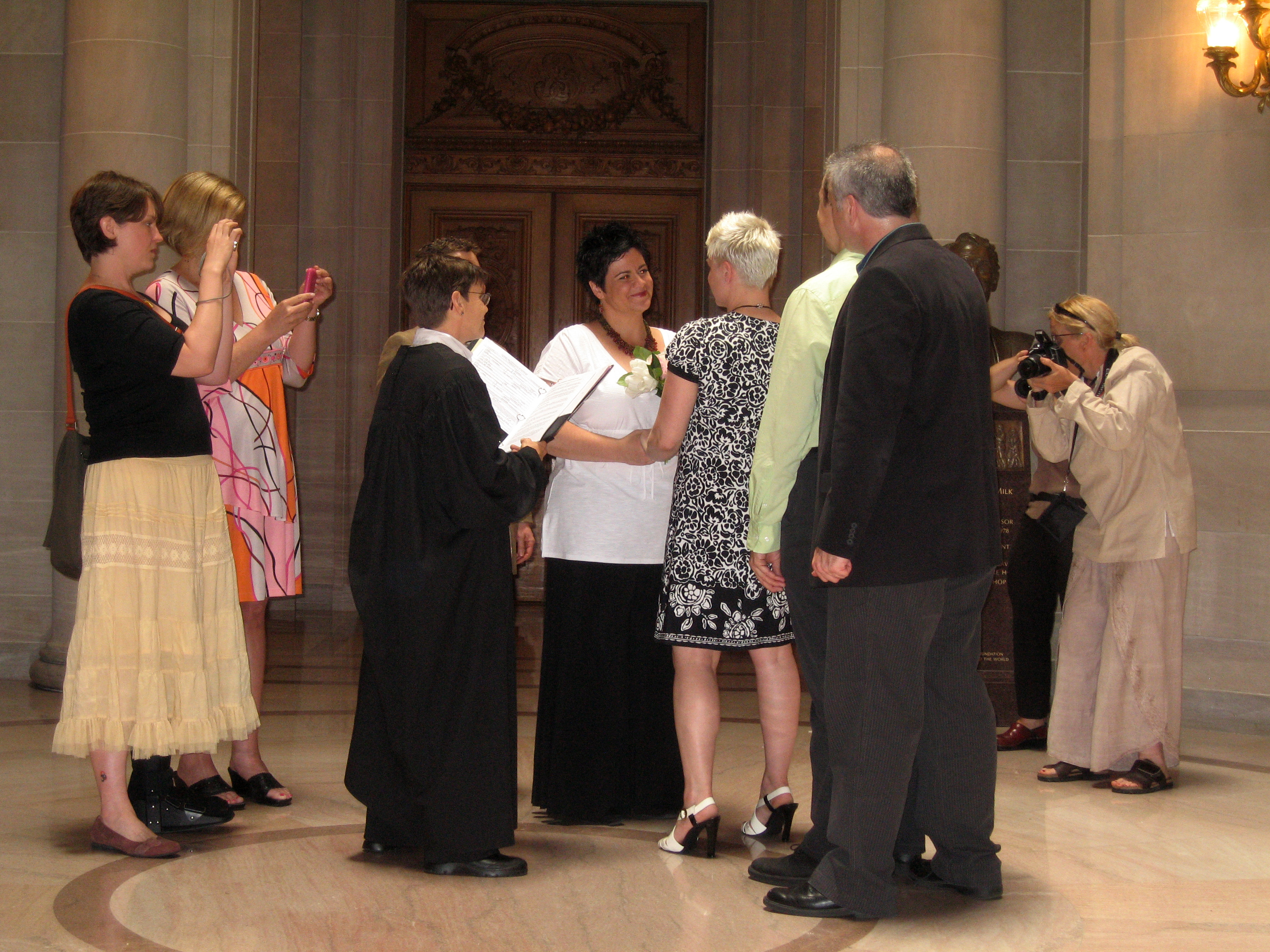
The wedding of a same-sex couple being performed in San Francisco City Hall in June 2008.

The legal issues surrounding same-sex marriage in the United States are determined by the nation's federal system of government, in which the status of a person, including marital status, is determined in large measure by the individual states. Prior to 1996, the federal government did not define marriage; any marriage recognized by a state was recognized, even if that marriage was not recognized by one or more states, as was the case until 1967 with interracial marriage, which some states banned by statute.

Prior to 2004, same-sex marriage was not performed or recognized in any U.S. jurisdiction, but subsequently began to be performed and recognized by law in different jurisdictions through legislation, court rulings, tribal council rulings, and popular referendums.

The Supreme Court's ruling in Obergefell v. Hodges ended all inter-state legal complications surrounding same-sex marriage, as it orders states to both perform the marriages of same-sex couples and to recognize the marriages of same-sex couples performed in other states.

=== Federal law ===
Status of same-sex marriage in the United States Performed and recognized Recognized when performed elsewhere Recognized by state and federal governments, but not by tribal government (mixed jurisdiction; not performed by tribal government) (mixed jurisdiction; not performed or recognized by tribal government)

According to the Government Accountability Office (GAO) in 2004, 1,138 federal rights and protections are conferred to U.S. citizens upon marriage; areas affected include Social Security benefits, veterans' benefits, health insurance, Medicaid, hospital visitation, estate taxes, retirement savings, pensions, family leave, and immigration law.

Since July 9, 2015, married same-sex couples throughout the United States have had equal access to all the federal benefits that married opposite-sex couples have.

The Defense of Marriage Act (DOMA) was enacted in 1996. DOMA's Section 2 says that no state needs to recognize the legal validity of a same-sex relationship even if recognized as marriage by another state. It purports to relieve a state of its reciprocal obligation to honor the laws of other states as required by the Constitution's Full Faith and Credit Clause. Even before DOMA, however, states sometimes refused to recognize a marriage from another jurisdiction if it was counter to its "strongly held public policies". Most lawsuits that sought to require a state to recognize a marriage established in another jurisdiction argue on the basis of equal protection and due process, not the Full Faith and Credit Clause. (Note: Among many examples: (1) the U.S. District Court ruling in Bourke v. Beshear, which required Kentucky to recognize same-sex marriages from Canada and several U.S. states, was decided on equal protection grounds alone. The plaintiffs claimed that Kentucky's ban violated the Full Faith and Credit Clause, but the court found it unnecessary to address that argument, and (2) the plaintiffs in Robicheaux v. Caldwell, who sought Louisiana's recognition of their out-of-state marriages, argued only on the basis of equal protection and due process. One of the Louisiana statutes they challenged made clear the state's assertion of its right to deny recognition to the legal act of another state: "A purported marriage between persons of the same sex violates a strong public policy of the state of Louisiana". (emphasis added).)

DOMA's Section 3 defined marriage for the purposes of federal law as a union of one man and one woman. It was challenged in the federal courts. On July 8, 2010, Judge Joseph Tauro of the United States District Court for the District of Massachusetts held that the denial of federal rights and benefits to lawfully married Massachusetts same-sex couples is unconstitutional under the Equal Protection Clause of the U.S. Constitution. Beginning in 2010, eight federal courts found DOMA Section 3 unconstitutional in cases involving bankruptcy, public employee benefits, estate taxes, and immigration. On October 18, 2012, the Second Circuit Court of Appeals became the first court to hold sexual orientation to be a quasi-suspect classification and applied intermediate scrutiny to strike down Section 3 of DOMA as unconstitutional in Windsor v. United States. The U.S. Supreme Court ruled in Windsor on June 26, 2013, that Section 3 violated the Fifth Amendment. (Note: Other cases that sought review by the U.S. Supreme Court were Golinski v. Office of Personnel Management, Gill v. Office of Personnel Management, Massachusetts v. United States Department of Health and Human Services, and Pedersen v. Office of Personnel Management.)

As a result of the Windsor decision, married same-sex couples—regardless of domicile—have federal tax benefits (including the ability to file joint federal income tax returns), military benefits, federal employment benefits, and immigration benefits. In February 2014, the Justice Department expanded federal recognition of same-sex marriages to include bankruptcies, prison visits, survivor benefits and refusing to testify against a spouse. Likewise in June 2014, family medical leave benefits under the Family Medical Leave Act 1975 were extended to married same-sex couples. With respect to social security and veterans benefits, same-sex married couples are eligible for full benefits from the Veterans Affairs (VA) and the Social Security Administration (SSA). Prior to the Supreme Court's ruling in Obergefell v. Hodges on June 26, 2015, the VA and SSA could provide only limited benefits to married same-sex couples living in states where same-sex marriage was not legal. Effective March 27, 2015, the definition of spouse under the Family and Medical Leave Act of 1993 includes employees in a same-sex marriage regardless of state of residence. Following the Obergefell decision, the Justice Department extended all federal marriage benefits to married same-sex couples nationwide.

The federal government recognizes the marriages of same-sex couples who married in certain states in which same-sex marriage was legal for brief periods between the time a court order allowed such couples to marry and that court order was stayed, including Michigan. It also recognized marriages performed in Utah from December 20, 2013, to January 6, 2014, even while the state didn't. Under similar circumstances, it never took a position on Indiana or Wisconsin's marriages performed in brief periods, though it did recognize them once the respective states announced they would do so. It had not taken a position with respect to similar marriages in Arkansas prior to the Obergefell decision legalizing and recognizing same-sex marriages in all fifty states. The State Marriage Defense Act was proposed in Congress to force the federal government to follow individual state laws regarding same-sex marriage although it never passed either chamber.

Opponents of same-sex marriage have worked to prevent individual states from recognizing same-sex unions by attempting to amend the United States Constitution to restrict marriage to heterosexual unions. In 2006, the Federal Marriage Amendment, which would have prohibited states from recognizing same-sex marriages, was approved by the Senate Judiciary Committee on a party-line vote and was debated by the full Senate, but was ultimately defeated in both houses of Congress. On April 2, 2014, the Alabama House of Representatives adopted a resolution calling for a constitutional convention to propose an amendment to ban same-sex marriage nationwide.

In 2022, Justice Clarence Thomas named Obergefell v. Hodges as a case that should be revisited in his concurrence of Dobbs v. Jackson Women's Health Organization, which had overturned Roe v. Wade and Planned Parenthood v. Casey on the basis that abortion protection was not a "deeply rooted" right in the Constitution. To prevent the loss of the right to same-sex marriage, the House of Representatives passed the Respect for Marriage Act which would nullify DOMA and protect existing same-sex and interracial marriage licenses. In July, the bill passed 267–157, with 47 Republican representatives joining the Democrats. In December, the Senate passed the bill 61–36, and the House again voted 258–169 to pass it. President Joe Biden signed it into law on December 13, 2022. On November 10, 2025, the U.S. Supreme Court declined to hear a case that could challenge the Obergefell v. Hodges ruling - which means no more than three justices wanted to take up the case.

=== State and territorial recognition ===
Same-sex marriages are licensed in and recognized by all U.S. states and the District of Columbia, as well as all U.S. territories except American Samoa. However, under the Respect for Marriage Act, American Samoa must recognize all marriages between two people that were legally performed in another jurisdiction.

On January 6, 2016, Alabama's Chief Justice, Roy Moore, issued a ruling forbidding state officials from issuing marriage licenses to same-sex couples. The ruling had no effect as all Alabama counties continued either issuing marriage licenses to all couples or not issuing licenses at all. In May 2016, Moore was charged with ethics violations by the state Judicial Inquiry Commission for the ruling, subsequently being suspended from the bench for the remainder of his term on September 30 of that year.

==== Counties not issuing marriage licenses ====
As of 2020, there are apparently no counties in the United States that do not (or would not) register the marriages of same-sex couples.

- Officials of one Texas county, Irion, issued marriage licenses, but claimed they would refuse same-sex couples. Starting in 2017, they refused to comment on what they would do if a same-sex couple were to apply for license. However, as of March 2020, the Irion County clerk stated she would issue marriage licenses to same-sex couples and the form available on the office's website was not gender specific and stated no restrictions as to the genders of the applicants.
- Officials in several Alabama counties initially stopped issuing any marriage licenses rather than issue them to same-sex couples. By 2017, the number of counties doing this to avoid issuing them to same-sex couples dropped to eight. This was in accordance with a state law, which was passed in 1961 to preserve racial segregation by making it optional for county clerks to issue marriage licenses. The Alabama Legislature passed a bill replacing marriage licenses with marriage certificates in May 2019. These final eight counties resumed allowing couples to marry on August 29, 2019.
- Several Kentucky counties initially refused to marry same-sex couples. In response, Kentucky reformed its marriage license forms and removed the name of the county clerk from the licenses. As of June 2016, Chris Hartmann, director of the Kentucky-based Fairness Campaign, said that to his knowledge "there are no counties where marriage licenses are being denied" in his state.

==== Parental rights ====
Post-Obergefell, six states have, on occasion, attempted to deny same-sex couples full adoption rights to varying degrees. In Arkansas, Florida, Indiana, and Wisconsin, same-sex couples have been met with rejection when trying to get both parents' names listed on the birth certificate. In V.L. v. E.L., Alabama's highest court attempted to void an adoption decree obtained by a same-sex couple in Georgia, but the U.S. Supreme Court reversed, restoring joint custody to the adoptive mother on March 7, 2016. Mississippi had once banned same-sex couples from adopting, but the law requiring this was ruled unconstitutional by the United States District Court for the Southern District of Mississippi on March 31, 2016. With that ruling, adoption by same-sex couples became legal in all fifty states.

On June 26, 2017, the Supreme Court ruled by a 6–3 vote in the case of Pavan v. Smith that under their decision in Obergefell, same-sex couples must be treated equally to opposite-sex couples in the issuance of birth certificates. In December 2016, the Supreme Court of Arkansas upheld a state law only allowing opposite-sex couples to be automatically listed as parents on their children's birth certificates, while prohibiting same-sex couples from being allowed the same on an equal basis. The Supreme Court summarily reversed the Arkansas Supreme Court, finding that the disparity in treatment violated their decision in Obergefell.

=== Tribal law ===
The Supreme Court decision legalizing same-sex marriage in the states and territories did not legalize same-sex marriage in Native American tribal nations. In the United States, Congress (not the federal courts) has legal authority over Native reservations. Thus, unless Congress passes a law regarding same-sex marriage on such reservations, federally recognized Native American tribes have the legal right to form their own marriage laws. As of the time of the Obergefell ruling, 25 tribal nations legally recognized same-sex marriage. Some tribes have passed legislation specifically addressing same-sex relationships and some specify that state law and jurisdiction govern tribal marriages. As of April 2022, same-sex marriage is legally recognized in at least 47 tribal nations.

=== Local laws prior to Obergefell v. Hodges ===
State laws regarding same-sex marriage in the United States prior to Obergefell v. Hodges^{1} Same-sex marriage legal (including by court decision) Same-sex marriage ban overturned, decision stayed indefinitely Same-sex marriage banned where federal circuit court has found similar bans unconstitutional Same-sex marriage banned Same-sex marriage legality complicated^{1} Native American tribal nations have laws pertaining to same-sex marriage independent of state law. The federal government recognizes same-sex marriages, regardless of the current state of residence.

Prior to Obergefell, same-sex marriage was legal to at least some degree in thirty-eight states, one territory (Guam) and the District of Columbia; of the states, Missouri, Kansas, and Alabama had restrictions. Until United States v. Windsor, it was only legal in 12 states and the District of Columbia. Beginning in July 2013, over forty federal and state courts cited Windsor to strike down state bans on the licensing or recognition of same-sex marriage. Missouri recognized same-sex marriages from out of state and same-sex marriages licensed by the City of St. Louis under two separate state court orders; two other jurisdictions issued such licenses as well. In Kansas, marriage licenses were available to same-sex couples in most counties, but the state did not recognize their validity. Some counties in Alabama issued marriage licenses to same-sex couples for three weeks until the state Supreme Court ordered probate judges to stop doing so. That court's ruling did not address the recognition of same-sex marriages already licensed in Alabama, but referred to them as "purported 'marriage licenses'". In two additional states, same-sex marriages were previously legal between the time their bans were struck down and then stayed. Michigan recognized the validity of more than 300 marriage licenses issued to same-sex couples and those marriages. Arkansas recognized the more than 500 marriage licenses issued to same-sex couples there, and the Federal Government had not taken a position on Arkansas's marriage licenses.

States and territories with same-sex marriage before Obergefell v. Hodges
State or territory	Population	Date of Enactment/Ruling	Date Effective	Legalization method	Details
Alaska	736,732	October 12, 2014	October 17, 2014	Federal court decision	U.S. District Court for the District of Alaska ruling in Hamby v. Parnell.
Arizona	6,731,484	October 17, 2014	October 17, 2014	Federal court decision	U.S. District Court for the District of Arizona ruling in Connolly v. Jeanes and in Majors v. Horne.
California	38,802,500	May 15, 2008	June 16, 2008	State court decision → overturned by constitutional ban	California Supreme Court ruling in In re Marriage Cases. Ceased via state constitutional amendment after Proposition 8 passed on November 5, 2008.
California	38,802,500	August 4, 2010	June 28, 2013	Federal court decision → legislative statute	U.S. District Court for the Northern District of California ruling in Perry v. Schwarzenegger, finding Proposition 8 unconstitutional. Stayed during appeal, affirmed by the Ninth Circuit Court of Appeals as Perry v. Brown. Certiorari granted and appealed as Hollingsworth v. Perry to the U.S. Supreme Court; the high court dismissed Hollingsworth for lack of standing and vacated the Ninth Circuit decision below, resulting with the original decision in Perry left intact. Gender-neutral marriage bill passed by the California State Legislature and signed into law by the Governor of California took effect on January 1, 2015.
Colorado	5,355,866	July 9, 2014	October 7, 2014	State court decision → legislative statute	Colorado district court ruling in Brinkman v. Long and statutorily codified since August 2, 2019.
Colorado	5,355,866	July 23, 2014	October 7, 2014	Federal court decision → legislative statute	U.S. District Court for the District of Colorado ruling in Burns v. Hickenlooper and statutorily codified since August 2, 2019.
Connecticut	3,596,677	October 10, 2008	November 12, 2008	State court decision → legislative statute	Connecticut Supreme Court ruling in Kerrigan v. Commissioner of Public Health and statutorily codified since October 1, 2010.
Delaware	935,614	May 7, 2013	July 1, 2013	Legislative statute	Passed by the Delaware General Assembly and signed into law by the Governor of Delaware.
District of Columbia	658,893	December 18, 2009	March 9, 2010	Legislative statute	Passed by the Council of the District of Columbia.
Florida	19,893,297	August 21, 2014	January 6, 2015	Federal court decision	U.S. District Court for the Northern District of Florida ruling in Brenner v. Scott.
Guam	165,124 (not included in population total)	June 5, 2015	June 9, 2015	Binding federal court precedent → actions of territorial officials → federal court decision → legislative statute	Attorney General Elizabeth Barrett-Anderson deferred to the controlling precedent set by the Ninth Circuit Court of Appeals in Latta v. Otter, ordering that marriage licenses for same-sex couples be processed immediately beginning on April 15, 2015. District Court of Guam ruling in Aguero v. Calvo upholding the earlier decision by the Ninth Circuit and statutorily codified since August 27, 2015.
Hawaii	1,419,561	November 13, 2013	December 2, 2013	Legislative statute	Hawaii Marriage Equality Act passed by the Hawaii State Legislature and signed into law by the Governor of Hawaii.
Idaho	1,634,464	October 7, 2014	October 15, 2014	Federal court decision	U.S. District Court for the District of Idaho ruling in Latta v. Otter, upheld by the Ninth Circuit.
Illinois	12,880,580	November 20, 2013	June 1, 2014	Legislative statute	Passed by the Illinois General Assembly and signed into law by the Governor of Illinois.
Indiana	6,596,855	September 4, 2014	October 6, 2014	Federal court decision	U.S. District Court for the Southern District of Indiana ruling in Baskin v. Bogan. The Seventh Circuit Court of Appeals affirmed the district court's ruling.
Iowa	3,107,126	April 3, 2009	April 27, 2009	State court decision	Iowa Supreme Court ruling in Varnum v. Brien. One same-sex couple obtained a marriage licensed and married before initial ruling was stayed.
Maine	1,330,089	November 6, 2012	December 29, 2012	Initiative statute	Proposed by initiative as referendum Question 1, approved.
Maryland	5,976,407	November 6, 2012	January 1, 2013	Legislative statute → referendum	Civil Marriage Protection Act passed by the Maryland General Assembly; petitioned to referendum Question 6, upheld.
Massachusetts	6,745,408	November 18, 2003	May 17, 2004	State court decision	Massachusetts Supreme Judicial Court ruling in Goodridge v. Department of Public Health.
Minnesota	5,457,173	May 14, 2013	August 1, 2013	Legislative statute	Passed by the Minnesota Legislature and signed into law by the Governor of Minnesota.
Montana	1,023,579	November 19, 2014	November 19, 2014	Federal court decision	U.S. District Court for the District of Montana ruling in Rolando v. Fox.
Nevada	2,839,099	October 7, 2014	October 9, 2014	Federal court decision → legislative statute	Ninth Circuit Court of Appeals ruling in Sevcik v. Sandoval. The Ninth Circuit Court of Appeals overturned the U.S. District Court for the District of Nevada's ruling and statutorily codified since July 1, 2017.
New Hampshire	1,326,813	June 3, 2009	January 1, 2010	Legislative statute	Passed by the New Hampshire General Court and signed into law by the Governor of New Hampshire.
New Jersey	8,938,175	September 27, 2013	October 21, 2013	State court decision → legislative statute	New Jersey Superior Court ruling in Garden State Equality v. Dow; appellate courts affirmed by refusal to accept appeal; statutorily codified since January 10, 2022.
New Mexico	2,085,572	December 19, 2013	December 19, 2013	State court decision → legislative statute	New Mexico Supreme Court ruling in Griego v. Oliver and statutorily codified since July 1, 2019.
New York	19,746,227	June 24, 2011	July 24, 2011	Legislative statute	Marriage Equality Act passed by the New York State Legislature and signed into law by Governor Andrew Cuomo.
North Carolina	9,943,964	October 10, 2014	October 10, 2014	Federal court decision → legislative statute	U.S. District Court for the Western District of North Carolina ruling in General Synod of the United Church of Christ v. Cooper and statutorily codified since July 12, 2017.
Oklahoma	3,878,051	July 18, 2014	October 6, 2014	Federal court decision	U.S. District Court for the Northern District of Oklahoma ruling in Bishop v. Oklahoma. The Tenth Circuit affirmed the ruling in Bishop v. Smith.
Oregon	3,970,239	May 19, 2014	May 19, 2014	Federal court decision → legislative statute	U.S. District Court for the District of Oregon ruling in Geiger v. Kitzhaber and statutorily codified since January 1, 2016.
Pennsylvania	12,787,209	May 20, 2014	May 20, 2014	Federal court decision	U.S. District Court for the Middle District of Pennsylvania ruling in Whitewood v. Wolf.
Rhode Island	1,055,173	May 2, 2013	August 1, 2013	Legislative statute	Passed by the Rhode Island General Assembly and signed into law by the Governor of Rhode Island.
South Carolina	4,832,482	November 12, 2014	November 20, 2014	Federal court decision	U.S. District Court for the District of South Carolina ruling in Condon v. Haley.
Utah	2,942,902	June 25, 2014	October 6, 2014	Federal court decision	U.S. District Court for the District of Utah ruling in Kitchen v. Herbert. Marriages licensed between December 20, 2013, and January 6, 2014. The Tenth Circuit Court of Appeals affirmed the district court ruling in Kitchen v. Herbert.
Vermont	626,562	April 7, 2009	September 1, 2009	Legislative statute	Passed by the Vermont General Assembly, overriding Governor Jim Douglas' veto.
Virginia	8,326,289	July 28, 2014	October 6, 2014	Federal court decision → Legislative statute	U.S. District Court for the Eastern District of Virginia ruling in Bostic v. Rainey. The Fourth Circuit Court of Appeals affirmed the U.S. district court ruling in Bostic v. Schaefer and statutorily codified since July 1, 2020.
(Washington (state)) Washington	7,061,530	November 6, 2012	December 6, 2012	Legislative statute → referendum	Passed by the Washington State Legislature; suspended by petition and referred to Referendum 74, approved.
West Virginia	1,850,326	October 9, 2014	October 9, 2014	Binding federal court precedent → actions of state officials → federal court decision	Governor Earl Ray Tomblin and state Attorney General Patrick Morrisey, recognizing the precedent established by the Fourth Circuit ruling in Bostic v. Schaefer, dropped their defense of the state's same-sex marriage ban. The U.S. District Court for the Southern District of West Virginia in McGee v. Cole overturned West Virginia's statutory ban on same-sex marriage on November 7, 2014.
Wisconsin	5,757,564	September 4, 2014	October 6, 2014	Federal court decision	U.S. District Court for the Western District of Wisconsin ruling in Wolf v. Walker. The Seventh Circuit Court of Appeals affirmed the district court's ruling.
Wyoming	584,153	October 17, 2014	October 21, 2014	Federal court decision	U.S. District Court for the District of Wyoming ruling in Guzzo v. Mead.
Total	221,434,635 (69.4% of the U.S. population)				

Note: This table shows only states that licensed and recognized same-sex marriages or had legalized them, before Obergefell v. Hodges. It does not include states that recognized same-sex marriages from other jurisdictions but did not license them.

== Debate ==
=== Support ===
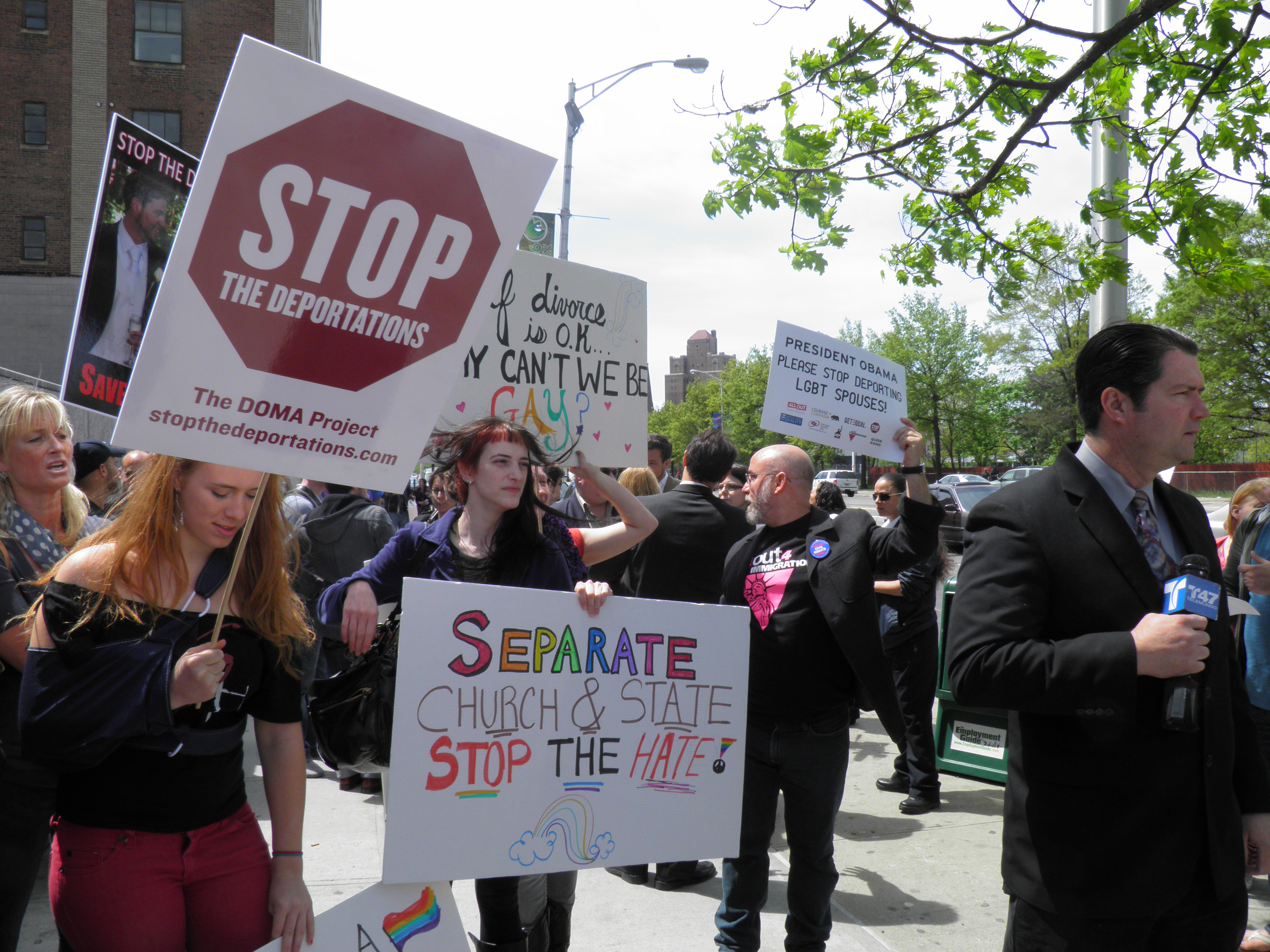
2011 protest in New Jersey by Garden State Equality in support of same-sex marriage and against deportation of LGBT spouses.

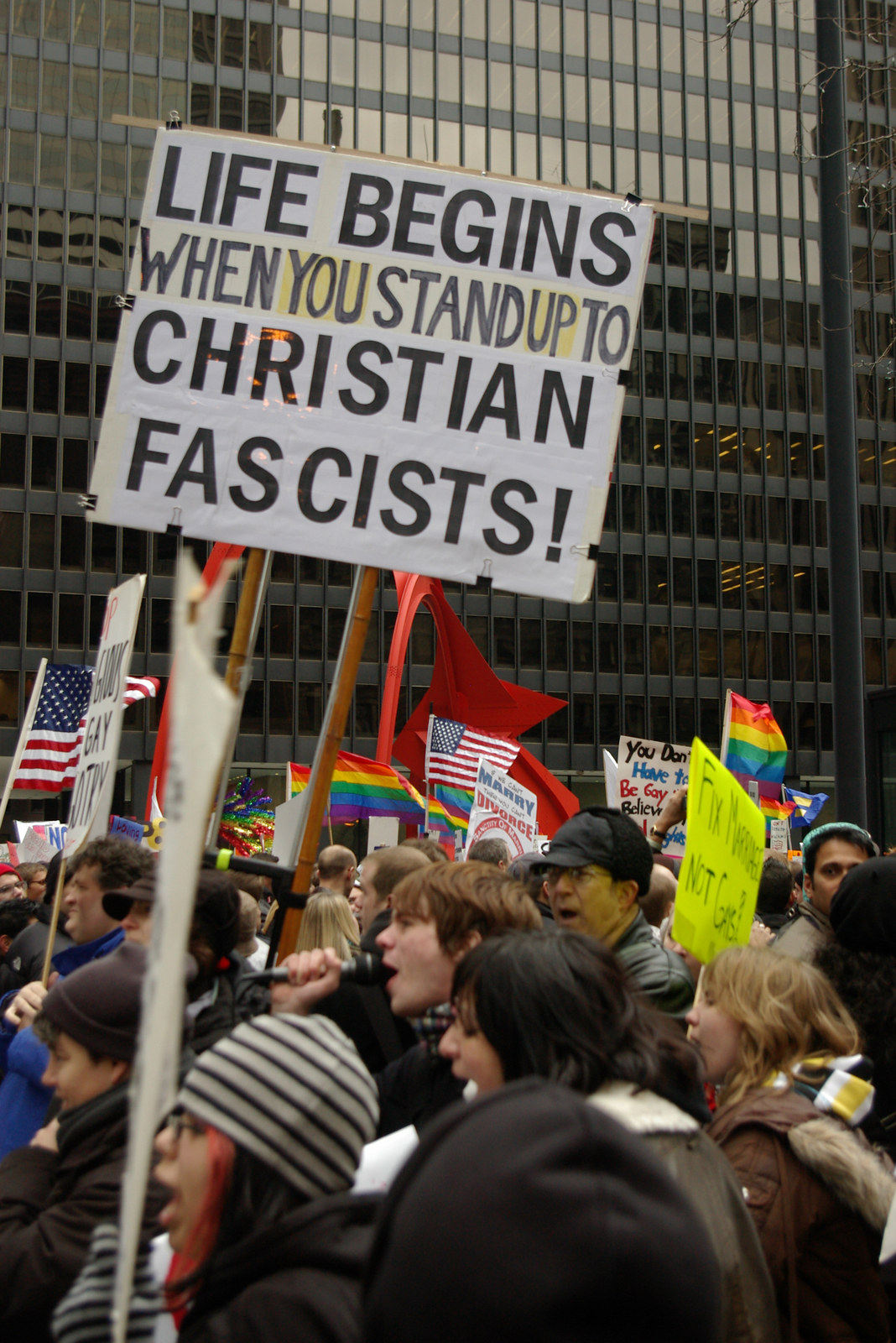
Anti-fascist and anti-Christian Sign at a homosexual rights protest criticizing Christian fascism and Christianity, saying in all caps "Life begins when you standup to Christian fascists". Event was located at the Federal Plaza in Chicago of 2008.

In the United States and Canada, professional organizations including the American Anthropological Association, the American Counseling Association, the American Academy of Pediatrics, the American Medical Association, the American Academy of Nursing, the American Psychological Association, the American Psychiatric Association, the Canadian Psychological Association, the American Sociological Association, the National Association of Social Workers, the American Psychoanalytic Association, the American Association for Marriage and Family Therapy, and the American Academy of Family Physicians have stated that the scientific evidence supports the following conclusions: homosexuality is a natural and normal human sexuality, sexual orientation is not a choice, gay people form stable and committed relationships that are essentially equivalent to the relationships of heterosexuals, same-sex parents are no less capable than opposite-sex parents to raise children, no civilization or viable social order depends on restricting marriage to heterosexuals, and the children of same-sex couples fare just as well or even better than the children of opposite-sex couples.

Prominent figures in the civil rights movement have expressed their support for same-sex marriage. In 2004, Coretta Scott King, a leader of the civil rights movement and the widow of Martin Luther King Jr., expressed her support for same-sex marriage and publicly denounced attempts to define marriage as the "union of a man and a woman" as a form of "gay bashing". In 2007, Mildred Loving, the joint plaintiff alongside her husband Richard Loving in the landmark civil rights case of Loving v. Virginia in 1967, in which the Supreme Court of the United States struck down all state bans on inter-racial marriage, issued a statement on the 40th anniversary of the ruling in which she expressed her support for same-sex marriage and described it as a civil right akin to inter-racial marriage, stating that "I believe all Americans, no matter their race, no matter their sex, no matter their sexual orientation, should have that same freedom to marry". In 2009, Julian Bond, a leader of the civil rights movement and a chairman of the NAACP, expressed his support for same-sex marriage and stated that "gay rights are civil rights". In 2012, Jesse Jackson, a leader of the civil rights movement, compared the fight for equality for gays and lesbians and the fight for same-sex marriage to the fight for equality for blacks, the fight for inter-racial marriage, the fight against anti-miscegenation laws, the fight for the right for blacks to vote, and the fight against slavery. In 2015, John Lewis, a leader of the civil rights movement and a chairman of the SNCC, welcomed the outcome of the landmark civil rights case of Obergefell v. Hodges in which the Supreme Court of the United States struck down all state bans on same-sex marriage, stating that "races don't fall in love, genders don't fall in love—people fall in love".

The NAACP, the leading African-American civil rights organization, has pledged its support for gay rights and same-sex marriage, stating that they "support marriage equality consistent with equal protection under the law provided under the Fourteenth Amendment of the United States Constitution", and has declared that same-sex marriage is a civil right.

The Human Rights Campaign, the largest LGBTQ rights organization in the United States, states that "many same-sex couples want the right to legally marry because they are in love — many, in fact, have spent the last 10, 20 or 50 years with that person — and they want to honor their relationship in the greatest way our society has to offer, by making a public commitment to stand together in good times and bad, through all the joys and challenges family life brings."

Journalist Gail Mathabane likens prohibitions on same-sex marriage to past prohibitions on interracial marriage in the United States. Author Fernando Espuelas argues that same-sex marriage should be allowed because it recognizes the civil right of a minority. Historian Nancy Cott rejects alternatives to same-sex marriage (such as civil unions), reasoning that "there really is no comparison, because there is nothing that is like marriage except marriage."

==== Role of social media ====
Supporters of same-sex marriage successfully utilized social media websites such as Facebook to help achieve their aims. Some have argued that the successful use of social media by LGBTQ rights organizations played a key role in the defeat of religion-based opposition.

One of the largest scale uses of social media to mobilize support for same-sex marriage preceded and coincided with the arrival at the U.S. Supreme Court of high-profile legal cases for Proposition 8 and DOMA in March 2013. The "red equal sign" project started by the Human Rights Campaign was an electronic campaign primarily based on Facebook that encouraged users to change their profile images to a red equal sign to express support for same-sex marriage. At the time of the court hearings, an estimated 2.5 million Facebook users changed their profile images to a red equal sign.

=== Opposition ===
Opposition to same-sex marriage is based on claims such as the beliefs that homosexuality is unnatural and abnormal, that the recognition of same-sex unions will promote homosexuality in society, and that children are better off when raised by opposite-sex couples. While some researchers question the definitiveness of the evidence, others assert that science has shown that homosexuality is a natural and normal human sexuality, that sexual orientation cannot be chosen, and that the children of same-sex couples fare just as well as children of opposite sex couples.

Others argue that the word "marriage" has always had a very specific meaning, i.e. the union of a man and a woman. By this argument, calling same-sex unions "marriages" is not a question of law but an example of Newspeak: same-sex unions are an inherently different entity than a marriage, and that entity has only gained legitimacy through Orwellian brainwashing. Critics of this position counter that historical changes in marriage traditions negate any fixed definition, so the word "marriage" can be infinitely redefined according to the needs of the culture.

Some of the opponents of same-sex marriage are religious groups such as the Catholic Church and the Southern Baptist Convention which desire for marriage to remain restricted to opposite-sex marriages. However, there are faith-based supporters of same-sex marriage, and homosexual people of faith, within every faith group. The Church of Jesus Christ of Latter-day Saints opposed the legalization of same-sex marriage but in 2022, endorsed a federal bill requiring states and territories to honor same-sex marriages solemnized in other states (though it reiterated that church doctrine would not change).

Political donations in opposition of same-sex marriage have been an issue of great dispute. Both judges and the IRS have ruled that it is either questionable or illegal for campaign contributions to be shielded by anonymity.

=== Politicians and media figures ===
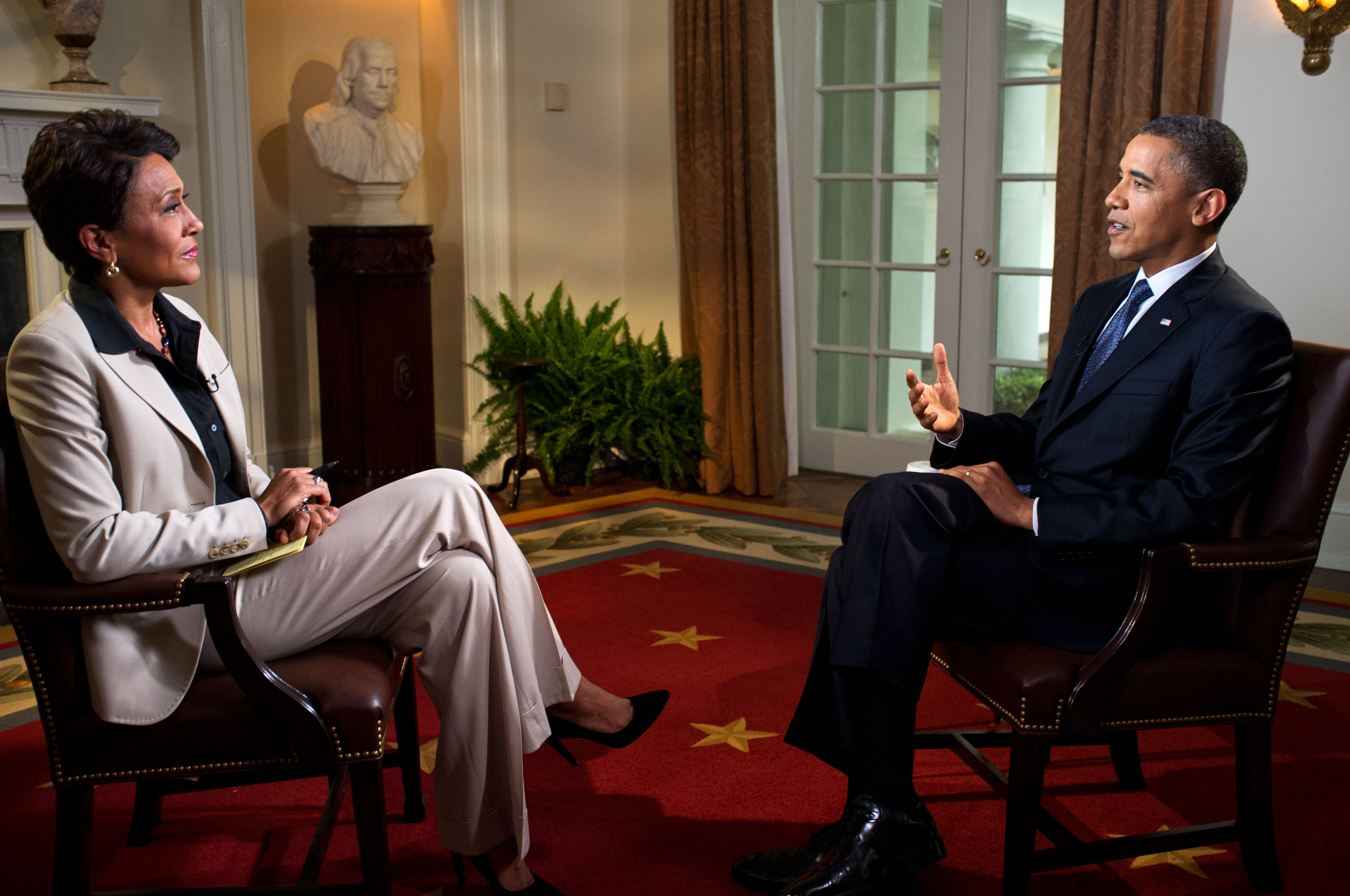
President Barack Obama interviewed by Robin Roberts of ABC's Good Morning America, at the White House, May 9, 2012.

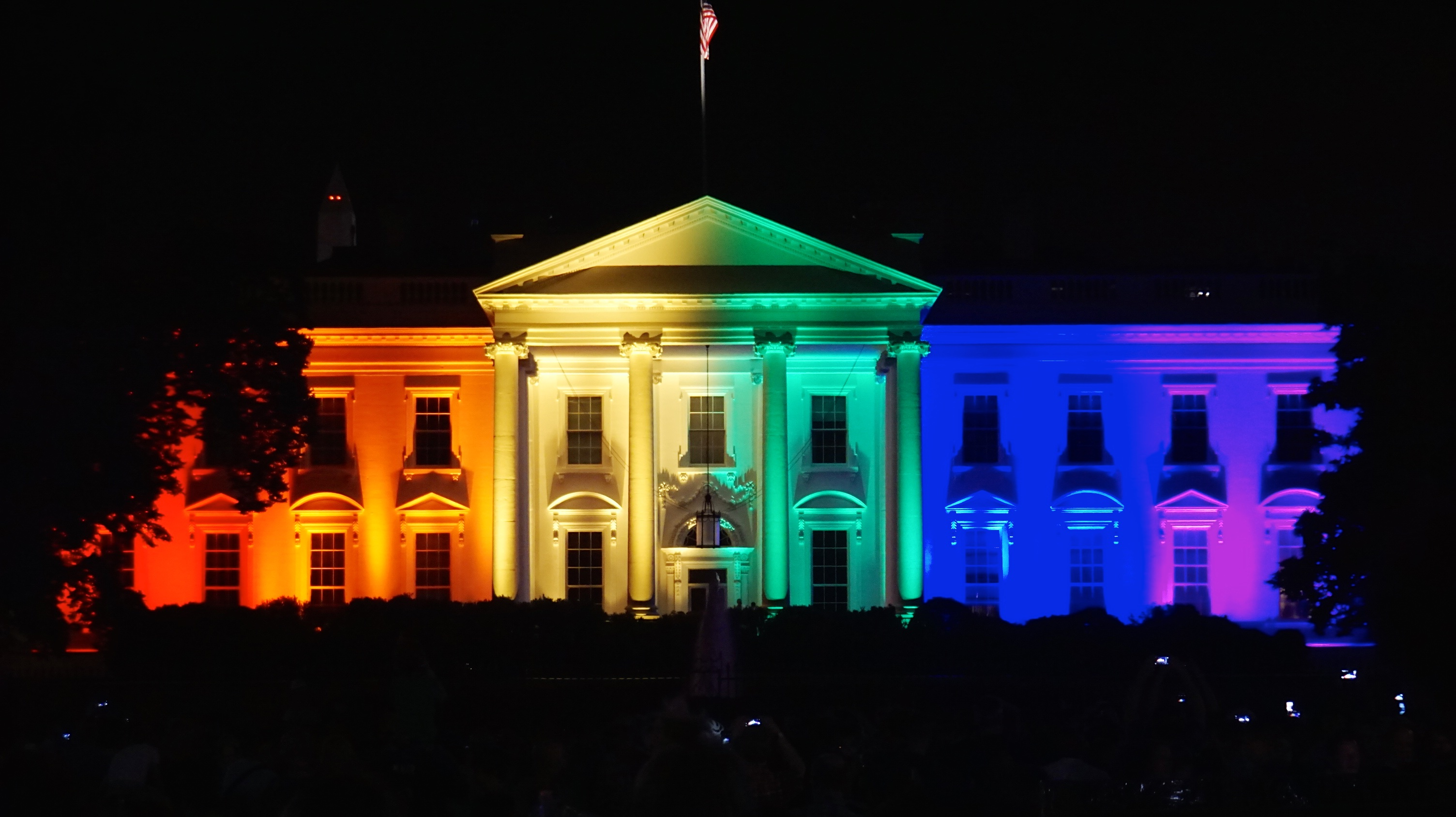
The White House, illuminated in rainbow colors, on the evening of the Obergefell ruling, June 26, 2015.

President Barack Obama's views on same-sex marriage varied over the course of his political career and became more consistently supportive of it over time. In the 1990s, he had supported same-sex marriage while campaigning for the Illinois Senate. During the 2008 presidential campaign, he was opposed to same-sex marriage, but he also opposed the 2008 California referendum that aimed at reversing a court ruling establishing same-sex marriage there. In 2009, he opposed two opposing federal legislative proposals that would have banned or established same-sex marriage nationally, stating that each state had to decide the issue. In December 2010, he expressed support for civil unions with rights equivalent to marriage and for federal recognition of same-sex relationships. He opposed a federal constitutional amendment to ban same-sex marriage. He also stated that his position on same-sex marriage was "evolving" and that he recognized that civil unions from the perspective of same-sex couples was "not enough". On May 9, 2012, President Obama became the first sitting president to support same-sex marriage. He still said the legal question belonged to the states. In October 2014, Obama told an interviewer that his view had changed:

Ultimately, I think the Equal Protection Clause does guarantee same-sex marriage in all fifty states. But, as you know, courts have always been strategic. There have been times where the stars were aligned and the Court, like a thunderbolt, issues a ruling like Brown v. Board of Education [1954], but that's pretty rare. And, given the direction of society, for the Court to have allowed the process to play out the way it has may make the shift less controversial and more lasting.

Shortly after winning the 2016 election, President Donald Trump said he's "fine" with same-sex marriage and believes it to be settled law: "It's law. It was settled in the Supreme Court. I mean, it's done." This somewhat contrasted with a previous statement he made in June 2015, after Obergefell v. Hodges, in which he said he's personally for "traditional marriage" and that he believed same-sex marriage should be left to the states. In that same statement, however, Trump admitted that overturning Obergefell is not realistic. Several of his federal appointments have also, subsequently, announced they will uphold same-sex marriage and enforce the Supreme Court ruling, while still being personally against same-sex marriage, namely Attorney General Jeff Sessions and Secretary of Education Betsy DeVos.

Former presidents Bill Clinton, Jimmy Carter, and Barack Obama, former vice presidents Dick Cheney, Al Gore, Walter Mondale, and Joe Biden have voiced their support for same-sex marriage, as have former first ladies Laura Bush, Hillary Clinton, Michelle Obama, and Nancy Reagan. Former President George H. W. Bush and his wife former First Lady Barbara Bush served as witnesses to a same-sex wedding, but neither publicly affirmed support for same-sex marriage in general; George W. Bush reportedly offered to officiate the same wedding, but has similarly not made a public statement regarding his position on the issue (as president, he was opposed). Fifteen U.S. senators announced their support in the spring of 2013. By April 2013, a majority of the Senate had expressed support for same-sex marriage. Senator Rob Portman of Ohio became the first sitting Republican senator to endorse same-sex marriage in March 2013, followed by Senator Mark Kirk of Illinois in April, Senator Lisa Murkowski of Alaska in June, and Senator Susan Collins of Maine a year later.

Politicians who have notably opposed same-sex marriage have included Rick Santorum, Mike Huckabee, and Sarah Palin.

Prominent politicians who have shifted from opposing to supporting same-sex marriage include Republican Senator Rob Portman, and Republican Representative Bob Barr (the author of the 1996 Defense of Marriage Act).

In an interview on The O'Reilly Factor in August 2010, when Glenn Beck was asked if he "believe(s) that gay marriage is a threat to [this] country in any way", he stated, "No I don't. ... I believe that Thomas Jefferson said: 'If it neither breaks my leg nor picks my pocket what difference is it to me?'"

== Studies ==
The overall effects of legal access to same-sex marriage have been summarized by Badgett and co-authors. The review found that sexual minority individuals took-up legal marriage when it became available to them (but at lower rates than different-sex couples). There is instead no evidence that same-sex marriage legalization affected different-sex marriages. On the health side, same-sex marriage legalization increased health insurance coverage for individuals in same-sex couples in the US, and it led to improvements in sexual health among men who have sex with men, while there is mixed evidence on mental health effects among sexual minorities. In addition, the study found mixed evidence on a range of downstream social outcomes such as attitudes toward LGBTQ+ people and employment choices of sexual minorities.

=== Adolescent attempted suicide ===
The establishment of same-sex marriage is associated with a significant reduction in the rate of attempted suicide among teenagers, with the effect being concentrated among teens of a minority sexual orientation. A study of nationwide data from across the United States from January 1999 to December 2015 revealed that the rate of attempted suicide among all students in grades 9–12 declined by 7% and the rate of attempted suicide among those of a minority sexual orientation in grades 9–12 declined by 14% in states which established same-sex marriage, resulting in approximately 134,000 fewer teens attempting suicide each year in the United States. The researchers took advantage of the gradual manner in which same-sex marriage was established in the United States (expanding from one state in 2004 to all fifty states in 2015) to compare the rate of attempted suicide among teens in each state over the time period studied. Once same-sex marriage was established in a particular state, the reduction in the rate of attempted suicide among teens in that state became permanent. No reduction in the rate of attempted suicide among teens occurred in a particular state until that state recognized same-sex marriage. The lead researcher of the study observed that "laws that have the greatest impact on gay adults may make gay kids feel more hopeful for the future".

=== Economic impact on same-sex couples ===
Until the Supreme Court's June 2013 ruling in United States v. Windsor required the Federal Government to treat lawfully married same-sex couples on an equal basis with lawfully married opposite-sex couples, same-sex married couples faced severe disadvantages. The Federal Government did not recognize those marriages for any purpose. According to a 1997 General Accounting Office study, at least 1,049 U.S. federal laws and regulations include references to marital status. A 2004 study by the Congressional Budget Office found 1,138 statutory provisions "in which marital status is a factor in determining or receiving 'benefits, rights, and privileges.'" Many of these laws govern property rights, benefits, and taxation. Same-sex couples whose marriages were not recognized by the Federal Government were ineligible for spousal and survivor Social Security benefits and were ineligible for the benefits of the spouse of a federal government employee. One study found that the difference in Social Security income for same-sex couples compared to opposite-sex married couples was US$5,588 per year.

Compared to similarly situated opposite-sex married couples, same-sex couples faced the following financial and legal disadvantages:

- Legal costs associated with obtaining domestic partner documents to gain legal abilities granted automatically by legal marriage, including power of attorney, health care decision-making, and inheritance
- A person can inherit an unlimited amount from a deceased spouse without incurring an estate tax, but was subject to taxes if inheriting from a same-sex partner
- Same-sex couples were not eligible to file jointly as a married couple and thus could not take the advantages of lower tax rates when the individual income of the partners differs significantly (Note: In early 2013, the IRS recognized the community property and income of same-sex partners in community property states.)
- Employer-provided health insurance coverage for a same-sex partner incurred federal income tax
- Higher health costs associated with lack of insurance and preventive care: 20% of same-sex couples had a member who was uninsured compared to 10% of married opposite-sex couples
- Inability to protect jointly owned home from loss due to costs of potential medical catastrophe
- Inability of a U.S. citizen to sponsor a same-sex spouse for citizenship

Some 7,400 companies were offering spousal benefits to same-sex couples as of 2008. In states that recognized same-sex marriages, same-sex couples could continue to receive those same benefits only if they married. Only 18% of private employers offered domestic partner health care benefits.

Same-sex couples face the same financial constraints of legal marriage as opposite-sex married couples, including the marriage penalty in taxation. While social service providers usually do not count one partner's assets toward the income means test for welfare and disability assistance for the other partner, a legally married couple's joint assets are normally used in calculating whether a married individual qualifies for assistance.

A 2019 study found an increase in employment among same-sex couples after the legalization of same-sex marriage. The author of the study provided additional evidence suggesting that this change in employment was driven by a decline in discrimination.

=== Economic impact on the state and federal governments ===
The 2004 Congressional Budget Office study, working from an assumption "that about 0.6 percent of adults would enter into same-sex marriages if they had the opportunity" (an assumption in which they admitted "significant uncertainty") estimated that legalizing same-sex marriage throughout the United States "would improve the budget's bottom line to a small extent: by less than $1 billion in each of the next 10 years". This result reflects an increase in net government revenues (increased income taxes due to marriage penalties more than offsetting decreased tax revenues arising from postponed estate taxes). Marriage recognition would increase the government expenses for Social Security and Federal Employee Health Benefits but that increase would be more than made up for by decreased expenses for Medicaid, Medicare, and Supplemental Security Income.

According to a study published in May 2020 by the Williams Institute on Sexual Orientation and Gender Identity Law and Public Policy, the legalization of same-sex marriage boosted state and local economies by an estimated 3.8 billion dollars. The Williams Institute estimated that the 300,000 same-sex couples who married in the U.S. since 2015 generated about $3.2 billion for local and state economies. In addition, traveling wedding guests spent an additional $544 million, and about 45,000 jobs were supported by same-sex weddings. $244 million was generated in state and local taxes.

=== Mental health ===
Based in part on research that has been conducted on the adverse effects of stigmatization of gays and lesbians, numerous prominent social science organizations have issued position statements supporting same-sex marriage and opposing discrimination on the basis of sexual orientation; these organizations include the American Psychoanalytic Association and the American Psychological Association.

Several psychological studies have shown that an increase in exposure to negative conversations, media messages, and negative reactions among peers about same-sex marriage creates a harmful environment for LGBTQ people that may affect their health and well-being, especially among its younger members.

One study surveyed more than 1,500 lesbian, gay and bisexual adults across the nation and found that respondents from the 25 states that have outlawed same-sex marriage had the highest reports of "minority stress"—the chronic social stress that results from minority-group stigmatization—as well as general psychological distress. According to the study, the negative campaigning that comes with a ban is directly responsible for the increased stress. Past research has shown that minority stress is linked to health risks such as risky sexual behavior and substance abuse.

Two other studies examined personal reports from LGBTQ adults and their families living in Memphis, Tennessee, immediately after a successful 2006 ballot campaign banned same-sex marriage. Most respondents reported feeling alienated from their communities. The studies also found that families experienced a kind of secondary minority stress, says Jennifer Arm, a counseling graduate student at the University of Memphis.

At the Perry v. Schwarzenegger trial, expert witness Ilan Meyer testified that the mental health outcomes for gays and lesbians would improve if laws such as Proposition 8 did not exist because "when people are exposed to more stress...they are more likely to get sick..." and that particular situation is consistent with laws that say to gay people "you are not welcome here, your relationships are not valued." Such laws have "significant power", he said.

=== Physical health ===
In 2009, a pair of economists at Emory University tied the passage of state bans on same-sex marriage in the US to an increase in the rates of HIV/AIDS infection. The study linked the passage of same-sex marriage ban in a state to an increase in the annual HIV rate within that state of roughly 4 cases per 100,000 population.

A study by the Columbia Mailman School of Public Health found that gay men in Massachusetts visited health clinics significantly less often following the legalization of same-sex marriage in that state.

== In popular culture ==
The Fox sitcom Roc was the first sitcom to feature a same-sex marriage in 1991. Since then, several shows and series have featured same-sex marriages, including amongst others Married...with Children, Roseanne ("December Bride"), Glee, Friends ("The One with the Lesbian Wedding"), Brooklyn Nine-Nine, Modern Family, The Simpsons ("There's Something About Marrying"), The Ellen DeGeneres Show, Brothers & Sisters, Grey's Anatomy, Will & Grace, Conan, Steven Universe, Shameless, The Fosters, etc.

The 22nd season premier of the PBS animated-show Arthur featured the marriage of teacher Mr. Ratburn and his male partner. Alabama's public television channel refused to air the episode.

== Marriage statistics ==
There is no complete data on the number of same-sex marriages conducted in the United States. Marriages and divorces are recorded by states, counties, and territories, plus New York City and the District of Columbia, but not by the Federal Government. States such as Oregon do not distinguish between opposite-sex and same-sex marriages in their official records. The legal records on marriage and divorce belong to the states.

In August 2016, the Treasury Department estimated the number of same-sex marriages by linking the tax returns of same-sex couples who had filed jointly in 2014 with their Social Security records. (Although this method excluded couples who file singly, these are small in number; of all married couples who file taxes, 97.5% file jointly.) This research showed that in 2014 there were about 183,280 married same-sex couples in the country, or "roughly a third of 1 percent of all marriages" according to The New York Times. Numbers from 2015 showed a large increase to 250,450 marriages. According to Census Bureau data, heterosexual marriages still accounted for about 98 percent of marriages for people under 35 in 2021.

According to the 2015 statistics, female couples were four times more likely to have children than male couples. Additionally, male couples earned a pretax average of $165,960 per year, while lesbian couples earned $118,415 and straight couples earned $115,210. The highest rates of female same-sex marriage were found in Oakland (2.1% of all marriages), Seattle, San Francisco, Springfield (MA) and Portland (OR), whereas gay male marriages were most frequent in San Francisco (3.2%), Washington D.C., New York City, Seattle and Fort Lauderdale.

The United States Census Bureau has collected data on unmarried same-sex households since 2005. Since 2013 following United States v. Windsor, the Bureau began recording married same-sex households in its Same-Sex Couples report.

Percent of same-sex households with children U.S. Census Bureau
	Married		Unmarried	
Year	male couple	female couple	male couple	female couple
2005	34.8%	39.0%	10.6%	24.7%
2006	37.0%	35.7%	10.2%	24.8%
2007	32.4%	38.6%	10.1%	24.6%
2008	33.9%	27.9%	7.4%	25.9%
2009	28.6%	28.9%	6.6%	21.9%
2010	25.2%	26.2%	6.2%	23.0%
2011	26.1%	26.2%	6.1%	21.9%
2012	25.3%	27.7%	6.4%	22.8%
2013	18.8%	27.0%	5.2%	20.5%
2014	16.2%	26.2%	6.0%	21.9%
2015	13.6%	26.0%	6.0%	22.1%
2016	12.8%	25.5%	5.6%	20.4%
2017	11.2%	25.5%	4.7%	21.2%
2018	12.4%	25.5%	4.9%	19.3%
2019	9.6%	27.0%	3.9%	19.7%
2020	Not available			
2021	8.9%	26.2%	3.5%	17.6%
2022	8.1%	27.1%	2.6%	16.2%

It recorded about 252,000 same-sex spouses in 2013; 335,000 in 2014; 425,000 in 2015; 487,000 in 2016; 555,000 in 2017; 593,000 in 2018. In 2018, the states of California, Texas and New York had the highest total number of same-sex households, whereas Wyoming, Vermont, South Dakota and Connecticut had the most married same-sex households in comparison to unmarried households (92.4% of Wyoming same-sex households were married, followed by Vermont at 79.3%, South Dakota at 77.8% and Connecticut at 70.7%). Nationally, 59.5% of cohabiting same-sex couples were married. In United States there were about 741,000 married same-sex couple households as of 2022.

The Population Reference Bureau reported that by October 2015 approximately 486,000 same-sex marriages had taken place in the United States. It estimated that 45% of all same-sex couples in the country were married at that time.

According to Gallup, the percent of cohabiting same-sex couples who are married rose from 38% in 2015 to 49% in 2016 and to 61% in 2017.

According to the Pew Report 2025, the number of U.S. households headed by married same-sex couples nearly doubled between 2015 and 2023, rising from 425,357 to 774,553. During the same period, the number of cohabiting same-sex households grew from 433,539 to 536,894. Despite these increases, married same-sex couples still made up only 1.3% of all married couples in the country, and cohabiting same-sex couples comprised 5.6% of all cohabiting couples in the country. These households tend to be more concentrated in the West (29%) and Northeast (19%), and less so in the South (35%) and Midwest (17%) when compared to different-sex couples. Relationship satisfaction is strong among same-sex couples: 92% of LGBTQ adults in same-sex relationships say things are going "fairly well" or "very well." Among those who are married, 69% report their relationship is going "very well," compared with 54% of cohabiting partners. Love, companionship, and commitment, were the main reason for marriage, but 64% also said access to legal rights and benefits was a major reason—rising to over 70% among those aged 50 and older.

== Case law ==
United States federal and state case law regarding same-sex marriage:

=== 1970s ===
- Anonymous v. Anonymous, 67 Misc.2d 982 (N.Y. 1971). The law makes no provision for a "marriage" between persons of the same sex.
- Baker v. Nelson, 191 N.W.2d 185 (Minn. 1971). Upholds a Minnesota law defining marriage as the union of a man and a woman. (Overruled by Obergefell v. Hodges in 2015; see below)
- Jones v. Hallahan, 501 S.W.2d 588 (Ky. 1973). Upholds the denial of a marriage license to two women in Kentucky based on dictionary definitions of marriage, despite the fact that state statutes do not specify the gender of marriage partners.
- Frances B. v. Mark B., 78 Misc.2d 112 (1974). Marriage is and always has been a contract between a man and a woman.
- Singer v. Hara, 522 P.2d 1187 (Wash. Ct. App. 1974). The historical definition of marriage is between one man and one woman, and same-sex couples are inherently ineligible to marry. This ban does not constitute sex discrimination.

=== 1980s ===
- Adams v. Howerton, 673 F.2d 1036 (9th Cir. 1982), cert. denied, 458 U.S. 1111. A same-sex marriage does not make one a "spouse" under the Immigration and Nationality Act.
- De Santo v. Barnsley, 476 A.2d 952 (Pa. Super. Ct. 1984). Same-sex couples cannot divorce because they cannot form a common law marriage.

=== 1990s ===
- In re Estate of Cooper, 149 Misc.2d 282 (Sur. Ct. Kings Co. 1990). The state has a compelling interest in fostering the traditional institution of marriage and prohibiting same-sex marriage.
- Baehr v. Lewin, 852 P.2d 44 (Haw. 1993). A statute limiting marriage to opposite-sex couples violates the Hawaii Constitution's equal protection clause unless the state can show that the statute is both justified by compelling state interests and also narrowly tailored. This ruling prompted the adoption of Hawaii's constitutional amendment allowing the State Legislature to restrict marriage to different-sex couples and the federal Defense of Marriage Act.
- Dean v. District of Columbia, 653 A.2d 307 (D.C. 1995). DC does not authorise same-sex marriage; denial of a marriage license does not violate the Due Process Clause of the United States Constitution.
- Storrs v. Holcomb, 645 N.Y.S.2d 286 (App. Div. 1996). New York does not recognize or authorize same-sex marriage. Overturned in part by Martinez v. County of Monroe in 2008.
- In re Estate of Hall, 707 N.E.2d 201, 206 (Ill. App. Ct. 1998). Illinois does not recognize a same-sex marriage. The petitioner's claim to be in a same-sex marriage was not in a marriage recognized by law.
- Baker v. Vermont, 170 Vt. 194; 744 A.2d 864 (Vt. 1999). The Common Benefits Clause of the Constitution of Vermont requires that same-sex couples be granted the same legal rights as married persons, though it need not be called marriage.

=== 2000s ===
- Frandsen v. County of Brevard, 828 So. 2d 757 (Fla. 2001). The Florida Constitution will not be construed to recognize same-sex marriage; sex classifications not subject to strict scrutiny under the Constitution.
- Burns v. Burns, 560 S.E.2d 47 (Ga. Ct. App. 2002). Marriage is the union of one man and one woman.
- In re Estate of Gardiner, 42 P.3d 120 (Kan. 2002). A post-operative male-to-female transsexual is not a woman within the meaning of the statutes and cannot validly marry a man.
- Rosengarten v. Downes, 806 A.2d 1066 (Conn. Ct. App. 2002). Connecticut will not dissolve a Vermont civil union.
- Standhardt v. Superior Court ex rel. County of Maricopa, 77 P.3d 451 (Ariz. Ct. App. 2003). The Constitution of Arizona does not provide the right to same-sex marriage.
- Goodridge v. Dept. of Public Health, 798 N.E.2d 941 (Mass. 2003). The denial of marriage licenses to same-sex couples violated provisions of the Massachusetts State Constitution guaranteeing individual liberty and equality, and it was not rationally related to a legitimate state interest.
- Morrison v. Sadler, 821 N.E.2d 15 (Ind. Super. Ct. 2005). Indiana's Defense of Marriage Act is valid.
- Langan v. St. Vincent's Hospital, 802 N.Y.S.2d 476 (App. Div. 2005). For the purposes of New York's wrongful death statute, the survivor partner from a Vermont civil union lacks standing as a "spouse".
- Citizens for Equal Protection v. Bruning, 455 F.3d 859 (8th Cir. 2006). Nebraska's Initiative Measure 416 does not violate the Fourteenth Amendment's Equal Protection Clause, was not a bill of attainder, and does not violate the First Amendment.
- Lewis v. Harris, 908 A.2d 196 (N.J. 2006). Prohibiting same-sex marriage does not violate the New Jersey Constitution, but the state must extend all the rights and responsibilities of marriage to same-sex couples. The New Jersey Legislature had 180 days to amend the marriage laws or create a "parallel structure".
- Andersen v. King County, 138 P.3d 963 (Wash. 2006). Washington's Defense of Marriage Act does not violate the State Constitution.
- Hernandez v. Robles, 855 N.E.2d 1 (N.Y. 2006). The New York Constitution does not require that marriage rights be extended to same-sex couples.
- Conaway v. Deane, 932 A.2d 571 (Md. 2007). Upholds a Maryland law defining marriage as the union of a man and a woman.
- Martinez v. County of Monroe, 850 N.Y.S.2d 740 (App. Div. 2008). Because New York recognizes the marriages of opposite-sex couples from other jurisdictions, it must do the same for same-sex couples.
- In re Marriage Cases, 183 P.3d 384 (Cal. 2008). Limiting marriage to opposite-sex couples is invalid under the equal protection clause of the California Constitution. Full marriage rights, not merely domestic partnership, must be offered to same-sex couples.
- Kerrigan v. Commissioner of Public Health, 957 A.2d 407 (Conn. 2008). The availability of civil unions but not marriage to same-sex partners is a violation of the equality and liberty provisions of the Connecticut Constitution.
- Strauss v. Horton, 207 P.3d 48 (Cal. 2009). Proposition 8 was validly adopted, and marriages contracted before its adoption remain valid.
- Varnum v. Brien, 763 N.W.2d 862 (Iowa 2009). Barring same-sex couples from marriage violates the equal protection provisions of the Iowa Constitution. Equal protection requires full marriage, rather than civil unions or some other substitute, for same-sex couples.

=== 2010s ===
Challenges to DOMA Section 3

- Gill v. Office of Personnel Management (2009–2013). Section 3 of the federal Defense of Marriage Act is found unconstitutional in U.S. district court. The First Circuit Court of Appeals affirms that ruling and stays implementation pending appeal. Windsor finds Section 3 unconstitutional and appeal of Gill is denied by the Supreme Court.
- Massachusetts v. United States Department of Health and Human Services (2009–2013). Decided alongside Gill with the same outcome.
- Golinski v. Office of Personnel Management (2010–2013). Section 3 of the federal Defense of Marriage Act is found unconstitutional in U.S. district court, which determines that sexual orientation is a quasi-suspect classification requiring the court to apply intermediate scrutiny, that is, to determine whether Section 3 relates to an important government interest. On appeal, the case is held in abeyance pending the decision of the U.S. Supreme Court in Windsor, which settles the issues raised in Golinski, the appeal of which to the Supreme Court is then denied.
- United States v. Windsor (2010–2013). Section 3 of the federal Defense of Marriage Act is found unconstitutional in U.S. district court. The Second Circuit Court of Appeals affirms that ruling, as does the U.S. Supreme Court. The U.S. Government began implementing the decision the same week.

California Proposition 8

- Hollingsworth v. Perry (2009–2013). California's Proposition 8, a voter-endorsed constitutional amendment banning same-sex marriage, is found unconstitutional in U.S. district court in Perry v. Schwarzenegger. The proposition's backers appeal to the Ninth Circuit Court of Appeals, which upholds the district court's finding of unconstitutionality in Perry v. Brown. The U.S. Supreme Court ruled that the proposition's backers lacked standing to appeal and left the district court ruling intact.

Same-sex marriage rights

- Christiansen v. Christiansen. On June 6, 2011, the Supreme Court of Wyoming grants a divorce to two women who married in Canada, but says its decision does not apply "in any context other than divorce".
- Port v. Cowan (2010–2012). Maryland must recognize valid out-of-state same-sex marriages under doctrine of comity.
- Garden State Equality v. Dow (2011–2013), New Jersey's civil unions violate due process guarantees; denying same-sex marriage ruled unconstitutional in state superior court. The N.J. Supreme Court refuses to stay the ruling and the state defendants drop their appeal.
- Griego v. Oliver, 316 P.3d 865 (N.M. 2013). The New Mexico Supreme Court rules that the State Constitution requires marriage rights to be extended to same-sex couples.
- Kitchen v. Herbert, 961 F. Supp. 2d 1181 (2013). U.S. district court rules Utah's ban on same-sex marriage unconstitutional. The Tenth Circuit Court of Appeals upholds that ruling on June 25, 2014. All parties support review by the U.S. Supreme Court, and that court denied review on October 6.
- Whitewood v. Wolf (Pennsylvania). On May 20, 2014, Judge John E. Jones III rules that Pennsylvania's same-sex marriage ban is unconstitutional.
- Geiger v. Kitzhaber and Rummell v. Kitzhaber (Oregon). On May 19, 2014, district judge Michael J. McShane declares Oregon's same-sex marriage ban unconstitutional.
- Bostic v. Schaefer (Virginia). The Fourth Circuit on July 28, 2014, in a 2–1 decision, affirms a district court ruling that Virginia's denial of marriage rights to same-sex couples is unconstitutional. The Supreme Court denied review on October 6.
- Baskin v. Bogan (Indiana) and Wolf v. Walker (Wisconsin). The Seventh Circuit consolidated these cases and on September 4, 2014, upheld two district court rulings that had found Indiana's and Wisconsin's bans on same-sex marriage unconstitutional. The U.S. Supreme Court denied review on October 6.
- Bishop v. Smith (Oklahoma). On July 18, 2014, the Tenth Circuit upholds the district court ruling that Oklahoma's ban on same-sex marriage is unconstitutional. The Supreme Court denied review on October 6.
- Barrier v. Vasterling (Missouri). State circuit judge J. Dale Youngs rules on October 3, 2014, that Missouri's refusal to recognize same-sex marriages from other jurisdictions violates the plaintiff same-sex couples' right to equal protection under both the state and federal constitutions.
- Caspar v. Snyder (Michigan). On January 15, 2015, U.S. district judge Mark A. Goldsmith ruled that the state must recognize the validity of "window marriages" established on March 21 and 22, 2014, before the Sixth Circuit Court of Appeals stayed a district court ruling in DeBoer v. Snyder that found Michigan's ban on same-sex marriage unconstitutional, despite the fact that DeBoer was later reversed. The state chose not to appeal.
- Obergefell v. Hodges (2013–2015). U.S. Supreme Court case finding state bans on same-sex marriage to be unconstitutional under the 14th Amendment. (Overturned Baker v. Nelson)

== Public opinion ==
Degree of public support for same-sex marriage by state in 2024: 80–87% 70–79% 60–69% 50–59%

Americans began to be polled occasionally on the topic in the 1980s and more regularly in the 1990s. From 1988 to 2009, support for same-sex marriage increased between 1% and 1.5% per year. In the 2010s, it increased more quickly.

Gallup found that nationwide public support reached 50% in May 2011, 60% in May 2015, 70% in May 2021 and peaking at 71% in 2023. Since then, support has been declining at 69% in 2024,, 68% in 2025 and 65% in 2026.

The Pew Research Center similarly found 40% in 2010, 50% in 2013 and 61% in 2019.

As of 2016, 83% of Americans aged 18–29 supported same-sex marriage.

As of 2021, there was majority support for same-sex marriage in 47 states, ranging from 50% in South Carolina to 85% in Massachusetts. There was plurality support in Alabama, with 49% supporting and 47% opposing. Only Mississippi and Arkansas had majority opposition to same-sex marriage; in Mississippi, 55% opposed and 44% supported, while in Arkansas, 52% opposed and 47% supported same-sex marriage.

As of 2018, 60% of Americans said they would not mind if their child married someone of the same gender.

Annual polling conducted by Gallup each May in 2017, 2018, 2019 and 2020 has found support for same-sex marriage stable, with two-thirds of Americans indicating that same-sex marriage should be recognized as valid under law (a range of 63% to 67% was recorded). In a 2024 Gallup poll, 69% of respondents stated that same-sex marriage should be legally recognized as valid under the law (83% of Democrats, 74% of independents and 46% of Republicans), while 29% were opposed. In May 2025, Gallup reported that 68% of Americans, 88% of Democrats, 76% of independents, and 41% of Republicans, supported same-sex marriage. Support among Republicans was the lowest since after the Obergefell verdict, while the 47-point difference between Republicans and Democrats was the largest since Gallup began tracking the measure 29 years ago.

A Grinnell College National Poll in September 2022 indicated that 74% of Americans thought that same-sex marriage should be a guaranteed right – 13% thought it should be left to elected officials, and 13% were unsure.

== See also ==
- Divorce of same-sex couples
- History of same-sex marriage in the United States
- LGBT employment discrimination in the United States
- LGBTQ rights in the United States
- Recognition of same-sex unions in the Americas
- Same-sex unions and military policy#United States
- Status of same-sex marriage
- Timeline of same-sex marriage in the United States
- Timeline of same-sex marriage

=== Legislation ===
- Domestic partnership in the United States
- Federal Marriage Amendment
- Respect for Marriage Act
- Former U.S. state constitutional amendments banning same-sex unions
- Same-sex marriage law in the United States by state
- Same-sex marriage legislation in the United States
- Same-sex unions in the United States

=== Miscellaneous ===
- A Union in Wait (documentary film)

== Bibliography ==
- Chauncey, George (2004). Why Marriage? The History Shaping Today's Debate over Gay Equality. New York: Basic Books. ISBN 0-465-00957-3.
- Corvino, John; Gallagher, Maggie (2012). Debating Same-Sex Marriage. New York: Oxford University Press. ISBN 978-0-19-975631-5.
- Dobson, James C. (2004). Marriage under Fire: Why We Must Win This War. Sisters, OR: Multnomah. ISBN 1-59052-431-4.
- Murdoch, Joyce; Price, Deb (2001). Courting Justice: Gay Men and Lesbians v. the Supreme Court. New York: Basic Books. ISBN 0-465-01513-1.
- NeJaime, Douglas (October 2012). "Marriage Inequality: Same-Sex Relationships, Religious Exemptions, and the Production of Sexual Orientation Discrimination". California Law Review. 100 (5): 1169–1238. JSTOR 23408736.
- Rauch, Jonathan (2004). Gay Marriage: Why It Is Good for Gays, Good for Straights, and Good for America. New York: Times Books. ISBN 0-8050-7633-6.
- Sullivan, Andrew (November 9, 2012) [1989, The New Republic]. "Here Comes the Groom: A (Conservative) Case for Gay Marriage". Slate.
- Sullivan, Andrew, ed. (2004). Same-Sex Marriage Pro & Con: A Reader (2nd ed.). Vintage. ISBN 1-4000-7866-0.
- Wolfson, Evan (2004). Why Marriage Matters: America, Equality, and Gay People's Right to Marry. New York: Simon & Schuster. ISBN 0-7432-6459-2.
