= Same-sex marriage in New York =

Same-sex marriage has been legally recognized in New York since July 24, 2011, under the Marriage Equality Act (2011). The Act does not have a residency restriction, as some similar laws in other U.S. states do. It also allows religious organizations to decline to officiate at same-sex wedding ceremonies.

In 2006, the New York Court of Appeals ruled that the New York State Constitution does not require same-sex marriage rights and left the question of recognition to the State Legislature. Following the 2006 court decision, the New York State Assembly passed same-sex marriage legislation in 2007, 2009, and 2011. The New York Senate rejected the legislation in a 38–24 vote on December 2, 2009. In June 2011, same-sex marriage legislation passed the House and the Senate, and was signed by Governor Andrew Cuomo on June 24, 2011. The law took effect on July 24, 2011. New York was the sixth U.S. state, excluding California which had constitutionally banned same-sex marriage, but still recognized prior marriages, and the seventh U.S. jurisdiction (after the District of Columbia), to license same-sex marriages. (Note: After Massachusetts, Connecticut, Iowa, Vermont, and New Hampshire) In 2024, the Constitution of New York was amended to explicitly ban discrimination on the basis of sexual orientation, reinforcing the state's legal recognition of same-sex marriage.

== Background ==
In the 1970s, members of the Gay Activists Alliance (GAA) carried out a zap at the New York City Marriage License Bureau demanding marriage rights for gays and lesbians. The direct action was in response to government discrimination against ceremonial same-sex unions that had been carried out in a church which the GAA used as a meeting space. Jim Owles was the founding president of the GAA, described as the largest militant gay rights organization in the United States.

The organization Marriage Equality New York (MENY) was founded in 1998 by activist Jesús Lebrón to fight for same-sex marriage rights.

=== New Paltz marriages (2004) ===
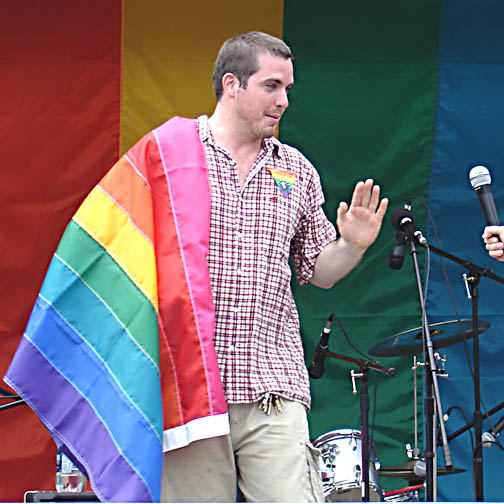
New Paltz Mayor Jason West at a gay rally, 2005

On February 27, 2004, Mayor Jason West of New Paltz married 25 same-sex couples in front of the New Paltz Village Hall. Not long thereafter, the Ulster County district attorney charged West with nineteen misdemeanors in connection with these marriages. A court later dismissed the charges against West, a ruling which the state appealed. Ulster County Court Judge J. Michael Bruhn ruled in favor of the state, reinstating the charges against West, arguing that this criminal case did not concern whether the State Constitution mandated same-sex marriage, but rather whether West violated his oath of office in performing illegal marriages. The May 2005 charges against West were reinstated; these were dropped by the prosecutor on July 12. After Liberty Counsel filed a civil lawsuit challenging the validity of the marriages, a state court judge issued a permanent injunction barring West from solemnizing same-sex marriages.

On February 27, 2004, Mayor John Shields of Nyack announced that he would recognize the New Paltz marriages, and on March 1, 2004, Mayor Carolyn K. Peterson of Ithaca declared that she would recognize same-sex marriages performed in other jurisdictions. Two days later, the Attorney General of New York, Eliot Spitzer, a supporter of same-sex marriage, issued an "informal opinion" stating that municipal clerks should not issue marriage licenses to same-sex couples since the New York State Legislature had not intended for the domestic relations law to cover same-sex couples.

=== Lawsuits ===
In 1990, a court ruled in In the Matter of Estate of Cooper that a same-sex partner of a deceased New York man could not be legally recognized as a "surviving spouse" under state law and could thus not inherit the estate of his late partner. Further, the court stated that "persons of the same sex have no constitutional rights to enter unto a marriage with each other."

In December 1995, a male couple in Ithaca, Phillip and Toshav Storrs, requested a marriage license from the city clerk. The couple filed a suit, Storrs v. Holcomb, in April 1996 against the Ithaca city clerk for denying their application for a marriage license. A trial court ruled against the couple, and they appealed to an intermediate-level appellate court. That court ruled that they had failed to include the New York State Department of Health as a necessary party and dismissed the suit. The couple re-filed their case in February 1998 against both the Ithaca city clerk and the Department of Health. A hearing was scheduled for September 11, 1998; however, the suit was dropped.

Shortly after Attorney General Spitzer's informal opinion was issued in 2004, five separate lawsuits were filed contesting the constitutionality of New York's opposite-sex definition of marriage. At the trial level, four failed and one succeeded (though it was stayed and later reversed). At the intermediate appellate level, four failed and one was not decided. The cases were all merged into one and heard by the Court of Appeals, the state's highest court, on May 31, 2006. On July 6, 2006, in a 4–2 decision, the Court of Appeals held in Hernandez v. Robles that New York law did not permit same-sex marriages and that there was no state constitutional right to same-sex marriage.

In October 2004, State Comptroller Alan Hevesi indicated that the state's retirement system would recognize same-sex marriages performed outside of New York for the purpose of state retirement and pension benefits. Not long thereafter, the Mayor of New York City, Michael Bloomberg, stated that he would ask that the city's five pension systems recognize domestic partnerships, civil unions, and same-sex marriages of city employees performed in other jurisdictions.

In June 2006, Westchester County Executive Andrew Spano issued an executive order, stating that Westchester County would officially recognize out-of-state marriages of same-sex couples the same way it recognizes marriages of different-sex couples. The Alliance Defending Freedom (ADF) sued in Godfrey v Spano and filed motions for a preliminary injunction and a temporary restraining order against Spano. In December 2008, the New York Appellate Division, Second Department affirmed the dismissal of the case, confirming that Spano lawfully recognized out-of-state marriages of same-sex couples. In November 2009, the New York Court of Appeals ruled that Westchester County could lawfully extend government benefits to same-sex couples in out-of-state marriages.

In February 2008, the Appellate Division, Fourth Department ruled unanimously in Martinez v. County of Monroe that because New York legally recognizes out-of-state marriages of opposite-sex couples, it must do the same for same-sex couples. On May 6, 2008, the Court of Appeals declined to hear Monroe County's appeal. In November 2008, Monroe County announced that it would not pursue any further appeals of the Appellate Division's decision.

On May 29, 2008, Governor David Paterson directed all New York state agencies to begin to revise their policies and regulations to recognize same-sex marriages performed in other jurisdictions. Governor Paterson's directive cited the Appellate Division decision in the Martinez case, as well as several lower court rulings. As a result of Paterson's directive, New York became the first state that did not allow same-sex marriages, but whose state agencies recognized same-sex marriages performed elsewhere. In addition, same-sex couples in New York had the option to travel to states where same-sex marriage was possible to get married and have their marriages fully recognized by New York state agencies. Governor Paterson's directive was challenged as both premature and unconstitutional in a lawsuit filed on June 3, 2008, by the Alliance Defense Fund on behalf of several state legislators and conservative leaders; this lawsuit failed at all levels. On September 2, 2008, Supreme Court Justice Lucy A. Billings issued a decision that Governor Paterson acted within his powers when he required state agencies to recognize same-sex marriages from outside the state. Justice Billings found that Paterson's order was consistent with state laws on the recognition of marriages from other jurisdictions. The Court of Appeals agreed to hear this and another case on same-sex marriage recognition in 2009. The court decided these cases on narrow grounds, finding that the state acted within its authority without reaching the issue of marriage recognition.

== Legislative history ==
Session	Bill number(s)	Date introduced	Sponsor(s)	# of cosponsors	Latest status
2009–2010	S04401	April 16, 2009	Senator Thomas Duane	18	Failed in the Senate (38–24)
2009–2010	A07732	April 16, 2009	Assemblyman Daniel O'Donnell	55	Passed the Assembly (89–52)
2011–2012	A08354	June 14, 2011	Assemblyman Daniel O'Donnell	67	Passed the Assembly (80–63) Passed the Senate (33–29); Signed by Governor Andrew Cuomo

Following the Hernandez v Robles decision in 2006, the focus of the same-sex marriage battle shifted to the executive and legislative branches of government. During his successful campaign for governor, Attorney General Spitzer said that he would push to legalize same-sex marriage if elected. Same-sex marriage legislation passed the New York State Assembly for the first time on June 19, 2007, but no action was taken in the Senate, and the bill died.

On March 12, 2008, Eliot Spitzer resigned from his position as governor. Following Spitzer's resignation, Lieutenant Governor David Paterson was sworn in as the 55th Governor of New York on March 17, 2008, by Chief Judge Judith Kaye. On April 9, 2008, Paterson pledged that he would continue to push for same-sex marriage legislation. He said he was "proud to have run on a ticket with now-former Governor Eliot Spitzer that was the first in the country to advocate for marriage equality and to win on that premise." "We will push on and bring full marriage equality in New York State".

On November 4, 2008, the Democratic Party gained a majority in the New York State Senate. Following the elections, three dissenting Senate Democrats declined to assure Senate Democratic Leader Malcolm Smith that they would vote for him as Senate Majority Leader when the Senate convened in January 2009. In December 2008, an agreement was allegedly reached between Senator Smith and the so-called "Gang of Three"; reports indicated that as part of the deal, Senator Smith agreed not to bring same-sex marriage legislation to a floor vote in the Senate during the 2009–2010 legislative session. However, on December 10, 2008, Senator Smith announced that the alleged agreement with three Democratic dissidents had been abandoned, and confirmed that he would not pledge to hold off on a same-sex marriage bill in the upcoming session. Senator Smith's decision placed control of the Senate by the Democratic Party in doubt, thus jeopardizing the passage of same-sex marriage legislation (since the Senate Republican leadership was opposed to same-sex marriage). After reaching an agreement with three Democratic dissidents, Smith was voted Senate Majority Leader on January 7, 2009.

A bill to legalize same-sex marriage passed the New York State Assembly a second time in 2009. Later in 2009, Senator Thomas Duane--the bill's sponsor--claimed that he had lined up support from a sufficient number of senators to pass same-sex marriage legislation, though opponents disagreed. Senator Smith stated he would not put the bill to a vote until he was sure it would pass. While same-sex marriage advocates declared that same-sex marriage would pass the Senate by the end of June 2009, the bill was not debated and voted upon until December of that year. On December 2, 2009, same-sex marriage legislation was defeated on the floor of the New York State Senate by a vote of 24 to 38; no Republican voted in favor, and eight Democrats voted against the bill. The Daily News described the defeat as a "major blow", while The New York Times stated that the defeat "all but ensures that the issue is dead in New York until at least 2011, when a new legislature will be installed." Elected officials and observers opined that the results of a 2009 special election in New York's 23rd congressional district — in which a Republican candidate who had voted for same-sex marriage withdrew her candidacy in the face of a challenge from a Conservative Party candidate — affected the marriage vote in the Senate.

After the failed effort to pass same-sex marriage legislation in 2009, LGBT activists continued to advocate for civil rights in 2010. Activists formed a direct action group named Queer Rising, and staged protests outside the New York City Marriage Bureau. Activists then increased the number of direct action protests, and succeeded in putting the issue on the social and legislative agenda for over a year. Queer Rising inspired the creation of other LGBT rights groups that, likewise, put pressure on the government to enact same-sex marriage. When it was revealed that the Catholic Church was lobbying against the passage of same-sex marriage, activists protested outside St. Patrick's Cathedral for same-sex marriage rights. Some of the activists, who led or participated in those demonstrations included Bob the Drag Queen and many more. Activists began to exert pressure on government officials to pass marriage equality legislation. State senators who had voted against same-sex marriage in 2009, such as Senator Shirley Huntley, were lobbied by advocacy groups to change their positions.

In late 2010, before the January 2011 expiration of his term as governor, David Paterson reached out to members of the State Senate in an attempt to gauge support for the passage of same-sex marriage legislation during a lame-duck session; however, Paterson came to the conclusion that passage of the bill during the lame-duck session was not feasible. When asked what would have to occur in order for same-sex marriage to be legalized in New York, Paterson responded, "Get rid of the lobbyists", and added that same-sex marriage advocates had forced a Senate floor vote prematurely in December 2009.

Also in 2010, several senators who had voted against same-sex marriage in 2009 were defeated. They were: Democrat Darrel Aubertine (defeated by a Republican), Democrats Hiram Monserrate and Bill Stachowski (both of whom were defeated in Democratic primaries by opponents who supported same-sex marriage) and Republican Frank Padavan. Also in 2010, three senators who had voted in favor of same-sex marriage in 2009 were defeated (although the marriage issue was not a prominent one in their 2010 re-election campaigns). They were Democrats Brian Foley, Craig M. Johnson, and Antoine Thompson.

=== Marriage Equality Act (2011) ===
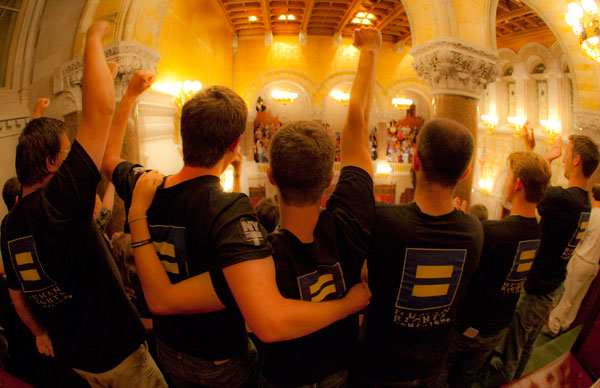
The moment of the Marriage Equality Act vote at the State Capitol in Albany, the evening of July 24, 2011. People in the foreground are wearing T-shirts bearing the logo of the Human Rights Campaign, one of many organizations backing the bill.

Governor Andrew Cuomo, who took office on December 31, 2010, supported same-sex marriage, as did New York City Mayor Michael Bloomberg. Cuomo called a March 2011 meeting with same-sex marriage advocates to strategize about the legislation, and he played a major role in pushing for it. Other supporters included the Empire State Pride Agenda, the Human Rights Campaign, Equality Matters, Freedom to Marry, and New Yorkers United for Marriage. Opponents included Archbishop Timothy Dolan of the Roman Catholic Archdiocese of New York, the National Organization for Marriage, Democratic State Senator Rubén Díaz Sr. of the Bronx, the Empire Missionary Baptist Convention, Orthodox Jewish leaders, New Yorkers for Constitutional Freedoms, and the Coalition to Save Marriage in New York. Also, in May 2011, the Conservative Party of New York State stated that it would withdraw support from any candidate who supported same-sex marriage.

On June 13, 2011, three Democratic senators who voted against the December 2009 same-sex marriage bill (Shirley Huntley, Carl Kruger and Joseph Addabbo Jr.) announced their support for the Marriage Equality Act. James Alesi became the first Republican senator to announce his support for the bill, and Roy McDonald became the second on June 14, narrowing the requirement for passage to just one. Senator Díaz resigned from the bicameral Black, Puerto Rican, Hispanic, and Asian Legislative Caucus to demonstrate his displeasure with its support for the legislation.

The New York State Assembly passed the Marriage Equality Act on June 15, 2011 by a margin of 80 to 63; this was a smaller margin of victory than three same-sex marriage bills had attained in the Assembly in prior years.

On June 24, Republican Senate Majority Leader Dean Skelos announced that the Senate would consider the Marriage Equality Act as the final bill of the legislative session. The bill was considered on the Senate floor on June 24. While the Senate met, the Assembly voted on a set of amendments that contained exemptions for religious and benevolent organizations. The proposed amendments passed the Senate with little debate by a vote of 36-26. The Marriage Equality Act passed the Senate later that evening by a vote of 33–29. Governor Andrew Cuomo signed the act into law at 11:55 P.M. Republican senators Mark Grisanti and Stephen Saland joined Sens. Alesi and McDonald as the only Senate Republicans supporting the legislation, while Sen. Díaz cast the only Senate Democratic vote against the bill.

Governor Andrew Cuomo signed the Marriage Equality Act into law on June 24, 2011. The definition of marriage in the state of New York was amended, and the following language was added to New York's marriage statute:

A marriage that is otherwise valid shall be valid regardless of whether the parties to the marriage are of the same or different sex. [N.Y. Dom. Rel.Law § 10-A]

The law took effect on July 24, 2011. The Marriage Equality Act does not contain a residency restriction, as some other U.S. states do. It also allows religious organizations to decline to officiate at same-sex wedding ceremonies. Kitty Lambert and Cheryle Rudd were married in Niagara Falls at midnight, July 24, becoming the first same-sex couple to marry in the state. Niagara Falls was lit in rainbow for the first time for the occasion.

== Aftermath of legalization ==
=== Reactions ===
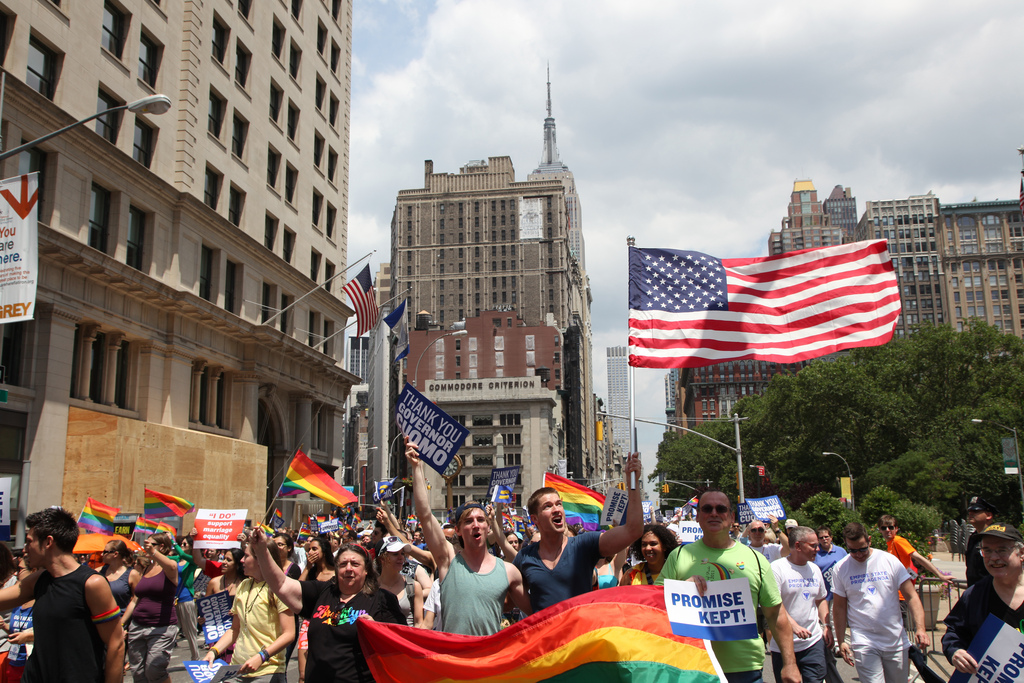
Participants at the NYC Pride March in June 2011 celebrating the legalization of same-sex marriage, with signs reading "Thank you Governor Cuomo"

The passage of the Marriage Equality Act was celebrated by gay rights supporters both in New York and nationwide. The New York Times responded with an editorial backing the law saying, "New York State has made a powerful and principled choice." Gay pride parades in celebration were held across the United States. Gay rights supporters expressed a belief that the legalization in New York would lead to legalization elsewhere.

The National Organization for Marriage pledged to spend $2 million in the 2012 elections to defeat the four Republicans and three Democrats who had previously stated opposition to same-sex marriage but voted for the bill. The Conservative Party said it would withdraw support for any candidate who had voted for the bill. In addition to action from opponents in New York, The New York Times reported that the bill's passage spurred renewed activism from opponents in various places across the country.

On July 12, 2011, the Town Clerk of Barker, Laura Fotusky, resigned because she objected to same-sex marriage and thus would not sign marriage licenses for same-sex couples. Her resignation came two weeks after another town clerk, from Volney, said she also objected to signing licenses but would not leave her position, saying a deputy clerk would have to do it. New Yorkers for Constitutional Freedoms said it would match the $25,000 salary Fotusky surrendered when she resigned. The Town Clerk of Granby, Ruth Sheldon, did the same a few days later. The Town Clerk of Ledyard, Rose Marie Belforti, made state and national headlines when she notified the town of Ledyard that she would not sign marriage licenses for same-sex couples due to her religious beliefs. Belforti later delegated marriage applications to a deputy. Same-sex marriage advocates and some town residents criticized Belforti for taking this action, and resident Ed Easter attempted to unseat her in the fall of 2011, but Belforti was re-elected by a substantial margin.

Following the passage of the Marriage Equality Act, the Research Library at the Buffalo History Museum became the first known library in the United States to collect wedding memorabilia from legally-wed same-sex couples.

=== Legal challenge ===
On July 25, 2011, the New Yorkers for Constitutional Freedoms, represented by Liberty Counsel, filed a lawsuit in the New York Supreme Court seeking an injunction against the Marriage Equality Act, alleging corruption and violations of the law in the process of passing the bill. On November 18, 2011, acting Supreme Court Justice Robert B. Wiggins ruled that the plaintiffs' case could proceed. Justice Wiggins allowed the plaintiffs' claims under the Open Meetings Law, but dismissed other portions of the case. Justice Wiggins' opinion included the following: "It is ironic that much of the state's brief passionately spews sanctimonious verbiage on the separation of powers in the governmental branches, and clear arm-twisting by the Executive on the Legislative permeates this entire process." On July 6, 2012, a five-judge panel of the Appellate Division ruled unanimously that no violation of the Open Meetings Law had occurred and dismissed the suit. On August 6, 2012, Liberty Counsel appealed to the Court of Appeals, which declined to hear the appeal on October 23.

=== Political impact ===
Four Republican senators, James Alesi, Mark Grisanti, Roy McDonald, and Stephen Saland, voted in favor of same-sex marriage. Of the four, only one−Mark Grisanti−was re-elected to the State Senate in 2012. On May 9, 2012, Alesi announced that he would not run for re-election and indicated that his vote on same-sex marriage would have "severely hampered" his chances in a Republican primary. Grisanti, McDonald, and Saland faced primary challenges in 2012. Grisanti won his primary by a large margin and got re-elected, but was defeated in 2014. McDonald lost the Republican primary to Saratoga County Clerk Kathleen Marchione, who went on to win the general election. Saland defeated primary challenger Neil Di Carlo by 107 votes, but lost the general election to Democrat Terry Gipson by a margin of approximately 2,000 votes. Di Carlo appeared on the Conservative Party line, receiving approximately 15,000 votes. Grisanti was defeated by Democrat Marc Panepinto in the 2014 elections.

=== Economic impact ===
According to New York City Mayor Michael Bloomberg and the Speaker of the New York City Council, Christine Quinn, "same sex-marriages in New York City have generated an estimated $259 million in economic impact and $16 million in City revenues" in the first year after the enactment of the Marriage Equality Act.

== Demographics and marriage statistics ==
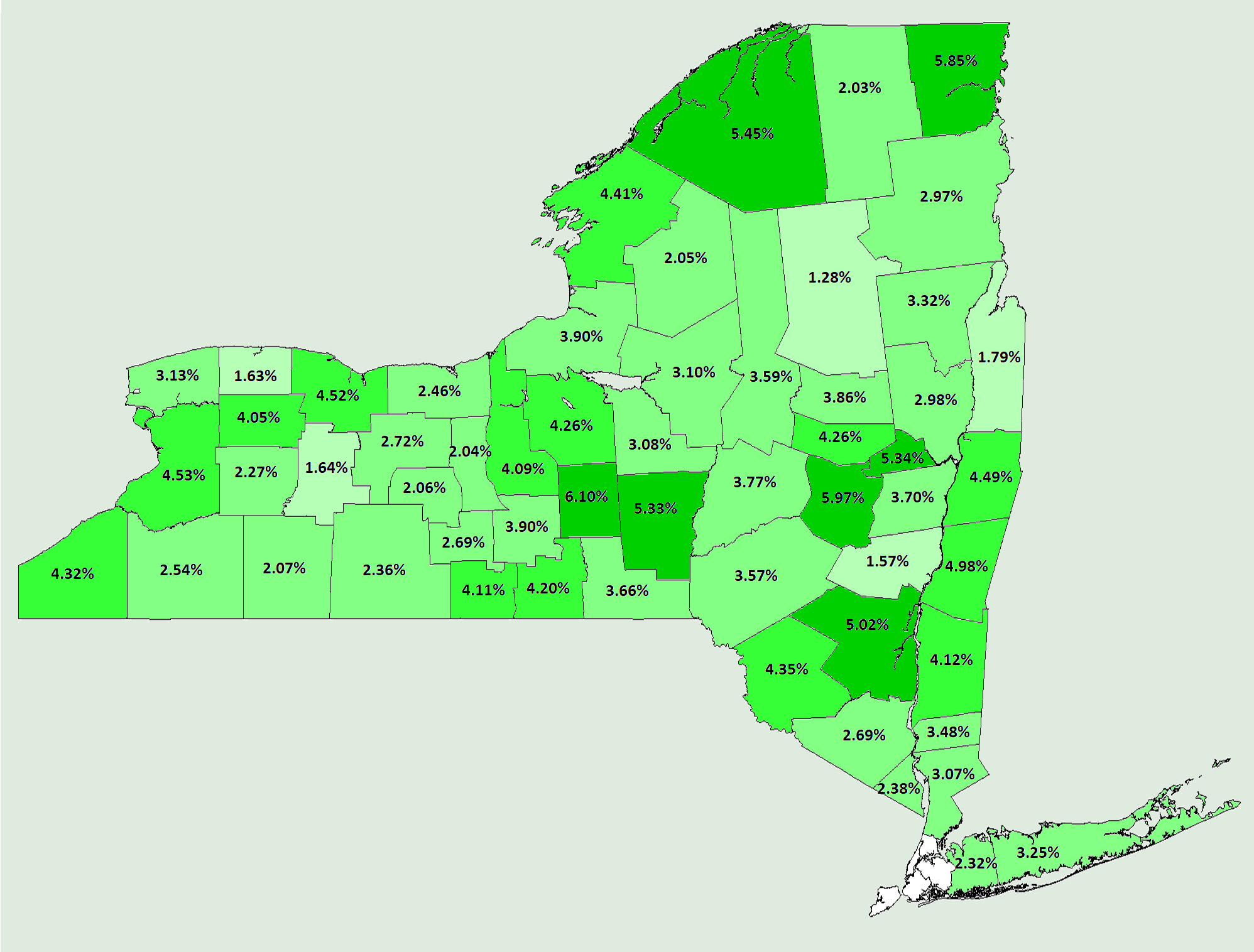
Percentage of same-sex marriages compared to opposite-sex marriages in New York's counties (excluding New York City) in 2017 5.02%–6.10% 4.05%–4.98% 2.04%–3.90% 1.28%–1.79%

Data from the 2000 U.S. census showed that 46,490 same-sex couples were living in New York. By 2005, this had increased to 50,854 couples, likely attributed to same-sex couples' growing willingness to disclose their partnerships on government surveys. Same-sex couples lived in all counties of the state and constituted 1.3% of coupled households and 0.7% of all households in the state. Most couples lived in Manhattan, Brooklyn, and Queens. Same-sex partners in New York were on average younger than opposite-sex partners, and significantly more likely to be employed. In addition, the average and median household incomes of same-sex couples were higher than different-sex couples, but same-sex couples were far less likely to own a home than opposite-sex partners. 20% of same-sex couples in New York were raising children under the age of 18, with an estimated 18,335 children living in households headed by same-sex couples in 2005.

From July 2011 to December 2012, approximately 12,285 same-sex marriages were performed in the state of New York.

The New York State Department of Health has recorded the number of same-sex marriages performed in New York (excluding New York City) since 2012, shown in the table below, with Erie, Suffolk and Westchester counties registering the most same-sex marriages.

Number of marriages performed in New York (excluding New York City)
Year	Same-sex			Opposite-sex	Unspecified	% same-sex
Year	Female	Male	Total	Opposite-sex	Unspecified	% same-sex
2012	1,792	1,004	2,796	49,827	7,771	4.63%
2013	2,354	1,677	4,031	50,688	5,334	6.71%
2014	1,926	1,267	3,193	53,318	4,767	5.21%
2015	1,223	821	2,054	53,697	4,578	3.40%
2016	1,229	827	2,056	54,704	4,416	3.36%
2017	1,097	733	1,830	53,182	4,344	3.08%
2018	1,048	604	1,652	52,221	3,759	2.87%
2019	1,040	604	1,644	50,319	3,225	2.98%
2020	911	591	1,502	41,031	2,596	3.33%

The 2020 U.S. census showed that there were 48,422 married same-sex couple households (26,428 male couples and 21,994 female couples) and 35,096 unmarried same-sex couple households in New York.

== Public opinion ==
Public opinion for same-sex marriage in New York
Poll source	Dates administered	Sample size	Margin of error	Support	Opposition	Do not know / refused
Public Religion Research Institute	March 9 – December 7, 2023	1,091 adults	± 0.82%^{1}	73%	23%	4%
Public Religion Research Institute	March 11 – December 14, 2022	?	?	75%	21%	4%
Public Religion Research Institute	March 8 – November 9, 2021	?	?	73%	25%	2%
Public Religion Research Institute	January 7 – December 20, 2020	3,079 adults	?	69%	24%	7%
Public Religion Research Institute	April 5 – December 23, 2017	4,548 adults	?	69%	24%	7%
Public Religion Research Institute	April 29, 2015 – January 7, 2016	7,072 adults	?	66%	25%	9%
Siena College Research Institute	February 22–28, 2014	720 registered voters	± 3.7%	65%	32%	3%
Public Religion Research Institute	November 12 – December 18, 2013	277 adults	± 6.8%	60%	32%	8%
Marist Poll	July 28–31, 2011	517 registered voters	± 4.5%	55%	36%	9%
Quinnipiac University	June 20–26, 2011	1,317 registered voters	± 2.7%	54%	40%	6%
Quinnipiac University	June 16–21, 2009	2,477 registered voters	± 2.0%	51%	41%	8%
Siena College Research Institute	May 18–21, 2009	622 registered voters	± 3.9%	46%	46%	8%
Quinnipiac University	May 5–11, 2009	2,828 registered voters	± 1.8%	46%	46%	8%
SurveyUSA	April 2009	500 adults	± 4.5%	49%	44%	7%
Siena College Research Institute	April 2009	682 likely voters	± 3.8%	53%	39%	8%
Quinnipiac University	April 5–12, 2004	1,279 registered voters	± 2.7%	37%	55%	8%

Notes:

- ^{1} The margin of error for the national survey was ± 0.82 percentage points at the 95% level of confidence, including the design effect for the survey of 1.56.

The April 2009 Siena College Research Institute poll of likely New York voters indicated that 53% of voters supported same-sex marriage and 39% opposed it. The poll showed that registered Democrats supported same-sex marriage by a 59% to 35% margin, while registered Republicans opposed it by virtually the same margin, 59% to 31%. According to the Quinnipiac University poll released the following month, New York voters were evenly split—46% to 46%—on same-sex marriage. The poll showed that same-sex marriage was opposed by majorities of African Americans (57%–35%), Republicans (68%–24%), white Catholics (53%–39%), and white Protestants (55%–38%). However, the Quinnipiac University poll published in June 2009 showed that New York voters supported same-sex marriage 51–41 percent, with eight percent undecided. According to this poll, same-sex marriage was supported by 52% of white voters with 42% opposed, and 55% of Hispanics with 39% opposed. African American voters polled 43% in favor and 42% opposed. In 2010, The New York Times estimated support for same-sex marriage in New York at 58%, based on projections from 2008 and a nationwide CNN poll in August 2010.

== Timeline ==
- February 26, 2004: Mayor Jason West of New Paltz announced that the village would start performing same-sex civil weddings. Although the village would not attempt to issue licenses for such weddings, couples in New York have six months from the wedding to seek such a license, and weddings are not invalid solely for not having a license.
- February 27, 2004: Mayor John Shields of Nyack announced that his village would recognize same-sex marriages performed elsewhere.
- March 2, 2004: West was charged with 19 misdemeanor counts of "solemnizing marriages without a license" by Ulster County District Attorney Donald Williams. West announced his intention to continue performing same-sex marriage ceremonies.
- March 3, 2004: Shields announced that he would begin officiating at same-sex marriages, and that he and his fiancé would join other gay and lesbian New Yorkers in seeking marriage licenses from municipal clerks' offices.
- March 3, 2004: The Office of New York Attorney General Eliot Spitzer issued an "informal opinion" that clerks should not issue marriage licenses to same-sex couples as the State Legislature had not intended same-sex marriages to be covered by the domestic relations law. The same opinion stated that same-sex marriages performed elsewhere were recognizable in New York under a recent judicial decision recognizing the validity of a Vermont civil union as granting the benefits of marriage, Langan v. St. Vincent's Hospital.
- March 5, 2004: New York State Judge Vincent Bradley issued a temporary restraining order barring West from performing any such ceremonies for a month. West indicated that he would abide by the judicial order while evaluating his legal options.
- March 22, 2004: Following an opinion requested in January from their attorney, the Rochester City Council announced that Rochester would recognize same-sex marriages performed elsewhere. Rochester is across Lake Ontario from Toronto, where same-sex marriages have been legal since 2003.
- October 8, 2004: State Comptroller Alan Hevesi indicated in a letter to a state employee that the state retirement system would recognize same-sex marriages contracted elsewhere for the purposes of retirement benefits for New York state employees.
- February 4, 2005: State Supreme Court Justice Doris Ling-Cohan ruled that New York City could not deny marriage licenses to same-sex couples, based on the Equal Protection Clause of the New York Constitution. The order was stayed for 30 days pending appeal. The Supreme Court is a trial-level court in New York, and the decision could be appealed either to the Appellate Division or directly to the Court of Appeals.
- December 8, 2005: The Appellate Division of the New York Supreme Court overturned Ling-Cohan's decision.
- July 6, 2006: The Court of Appeals in its Hernández v. Robles decision declined to judicially mandate the legalization of same-sex marriage in New York. The court ruling stated that same-sex partners did not have the right to marry under the New York Constitution.
- May 2007 : A Massachusetts trial court judge ruled that marriage licenses obtained by New York same-sex couples prior to the Hernandez v. Robles decision are valid under Massachusetts law.
- June 19, 2007: The Democrat-controlled New York State Assembly approved Governor Spitzer's bill to legalize same-sex marriage in New York, in an 85–61 vote. The bill moved to the Republican-controlled Senate. Senate Majority Leader Joseph Bruno said it would not be voted on in that chamber that year.
- January 9, 2008: Governor Spitzer's bill to legalize same-sex marriage died in the Senate and was returned to the State Assembly.
- February 1, 2008: In Martinez v. County of Monroe, the Appellate Division, Fourth Department ruled that a same-sex marriage performed in Canada should be recognized in New York because out-of-state opposite-sex marriages that would not have been legal in New York nonetheless are recognized unless such recognition would violate the public policy of the state. The Appellate Division held that the same treatment must be applied to out-of-state same-sex marriages, but the ruling could be overturned on a finding that same-sex marriage violated New York's public policy. The decision reversed a trial judge's 2006 ruling that Monroe Community College did not have to extend health care benefits to an employee's same-sex spouse.
- March 12, 2008: Eliot Spitzer resigned as governor of New York.
- March 17, 2008: Following Spitzer's resignation, David Paterson was sworn in as the 55th Governor of New York by New York Chief Judge Judith Kaye.
- April 2008: Governor Paterson pledged in a speech that he would continue to push for full marriage equality for New Yorkers.
- May 29, 2008: It was widely reported on this day that Governor Paterson had directed all state agencies to begin to revise their policies and regulations to recognize same-sex marriages performed in other jurisdictions. "In a directive issued on May 14, the governor's legal counsel, David Nocenti, instructed the agencies that gay couples married elsewhere 'should be afforded the same recognition as any other legally performed union.'" Opponents of same-sex marriage raised the possibility of a legal challenge.
- June 3, 2008: Governor Paterson's directive was challenged as both premature and unconstitutional in a lawsuit filed by the Alliance Defense Fund on behalf of several state legislators and conservative leaders in New York.
- September 2, 2008: The Alliance Defense Fund suit was dismissed by Supreme Court Justice Lucy A. Billings, with a finding that Governor Paterson acted within his powers when he required state agencies to recognize same-sex marriages from outside New York.
- September 8, 2008: The Alliance Defense Fund appealed Judge Billings' decision.
- November 4, 2008: On Election Day, the Democratic Party gained a majority in the New York State Senate.
- November 22, 2008: Monroe County announced that it would not pursue any further appeals of the Appellate Division's decision.
- December 2008: A deal was made among certain Democratic senators that would ensure the election of Malcolm Smith as Senate President pro tempore, making him the chamber's leader; reports indicated that as part of the deal, Senator Smith agreed not to bring same-sex marriage legislation to a floor vote in the Senate during the 2009–2010 legislative session.
- December 10, 2008: Smith broke off his alleged agreement with three Democratic dissidents and confirmed that he would not pledge to hold off on a same-sex marriage bill in the upcoming session. Senator Smith stated that "real reform cannot and should not ever include limiting the civil rights of any New Yorkers." This placed control of the Senate by the Democratic Party in doubt, despite its slight numerical majority.
- January 7, 2009: After reaching an agreement with three Democratic dissidents, Malcolm Smith was voted Senate Majority Leader.
- April 16, 2009: Governor Paterson officially introduced same-sex marriage legislation and vowed to push for its passage.
- May 12, 2009: The New York State Assembly passed same-sex marriage legislation in a bipartisan vote of 89–52.
- November 19, 2009: The New York Court of Appeals ruled in Godfrey v. Spano that Westchester County could lawfully extend government benefits to same-sex couples in out-of-state marriages.
- December 2, 2009: The New York State Assembly again passed the same-sex marriage bill by a vote of 88–51, but the Senate voted it down, 38–24.
- May 10, 2011: Assemblyman Daniel O'Donnell introduced a same-sex marriage bill to the Assembly.
- June 15, 2011: The New York State Assembly passed the same-sex marriage bill for the fourth time, by a vote of 80–63.
- June 24, 2011: The Senate passed the same-sex marriage bill in a 33 to 29 vote. Governor Andrew Cuomo signed the bill into law, which took effect 30 days later.
- July 24, 2011: The Marriage Equality Act went into effect. Kitty Lambert and Cheryle Rudd of Buffalo were married in Niagara Falls at midnight, becoming the first couple in the state to benefit from the newly enacted law. Niagara Falls was lit in rainbow for the first time for the occasion.

== Timeline of civil suits for same-sex marriage ==
Several court cases pertaining to the recognition and licensing of same-sex marriages in New York have been filed over the years.

=== Hernández case ===
- March 5, 2004: Five same-sex couples, backed by Lambda Legal, filed suit challenging the constitutionality of limiting marriage to opposite-sex couples only. The complaint relied on both equal protection and due process claims.
- February 4, 2005: Manhattan Supreme Court Judge Doris Ling-Cohan issued an opinion in Hernández v. Robles, ruling that the New York Constitution guaranteed basic rights to gays and lesbians, which the state violated when it prevented them from marrying. Ling-Cohan stayed her ruling for a 30-day period, giving the state time to appeal.
- September 13, 2005: Oral arguments were heard by the Appellate Division of the Supreme Court, First Judicial Department.
- December 8, 2005: The Appellate Division reversed the trial court with one dissent in a 4–1 decision that said the issue should be handled by the State Legislature.
- May 31, 2006: After the couples filed an appeal, oral arguments were heard by the New York State Court of Appeals.
- July 6, 2006: The Court of Appeals issued a 4–2 decision upholding New York's existing marriage statutes and declining to mandate the legalization of same-sex marriage in New York. The court ruling stated that same-sex partners did not have the right to marry each other under the New York Constitution. It rejected the plaintiffs' attempt to use the U.S. Supreme Court's ruling in Loving v. Virginia as precedent because "a long and shameful history of racism lay behind the kind of statute invalidated in Loving" while "the traditional definition of marriage is not merely a by-product of historical injustice".

=== Shields case ===
- March 11, 2004: Ten same-sex couples filed suit to obtain an order requiring their town clerk to issue them marriage licenses and the Department of Health to recognize them. If the statutory argument failed, the suit challenged the constitutionality of the domestic relations law. Mayor John Shields of Nyack was one of the parties to the suit.
- October 18, 2004: Supreme Court Judge Alfred J. Weiner issued an opinion in Shields v. Madigan rejecting the statutory interpretation and constitutional challenges for same-sex marriage. The domestic relations law was determined to allow only opposite-sex marriages, and equal protection and due process claims were both denied.
- March 28, 2006: Oral arguments were heard by the Appellate Division of the Supreme Court, Second Judicial Department.
- July 6, 2006: The Court of Appeals issued a 4–2 decision in the four other marriage cases. This case is now effectively moot.

=== Samuels case ===
- April 7, 2004: Thirteen same-sex couples, backed by the American Civil Liberties Union, filed suit to have the state's marriage laws declared unconstitutional. Daniel O'Donnell, New York State Assemblyman (and brother of celebrity Rosie O'Donnell), was one of the parties to the suit.
- December 7, 2004: Rockland County Supreme Court Judge Joseph C. Teresi issued an opinion in Samuels v. New York State Department of Health rejecting the four constitutional claims for same-sex marriage. Equal protection based on sexual orientation, equal protection based on gender, due process, and free speech were all argued to be violated by New York's domestic relations law, but none was found to have merit.
- October 17, 2005: Oral arguments were heard by the Appellate Division of the Supreme Court, Third Judicial Department.
- February 16, 2006: The Appellate Division affirmed the trial court in a 5–0 decision that consolidated all three cases (Samuels, Seymour, and Kane) on appeal in its jurisdiction.
- May 31, 2006: Oral arguments were heard by the New York State Court of Appeals.
- July 6, 2006: The Court of Appeals issued a 4–2 decision upholding New York's existing marriage statutes and declining to judicially mandate the legalization of same-sex marriage in New York. The court ruling stated that same-sex partners did not have the right to marry each other under the New York Constitution.

=== Seymour case ===
- June 2, 2004: Twenty-five same-sex couples, backed by the city of Ithaca, filed suit to have the domestic relations law include same-sex marriage. If the law was determined not to apply to same-sex couples, the suit challenged the prohibition on a constitutional basis.
- February 23, 2005: Tompkins Supreme Court Judge Robert C. Mulvey issued an opinion in Seymour v. Holcomb rejecting Ithaca's standing to sue, the statutory claim, and the constitutional claims based on equal protection, due process, and free expression.
- October 17, 2005: Oral arguments were heard by the Appellate Division of the Supreme Court, Third Judicial Department.
- February 16, 2006: The Appellate Division affirmed the trial court in a 5–0 decision that consolidated all three cases (Samuels, Seymour, and Kane) on appeal in its jurisdiction.
- May 31, 2006: Oral arguments were heard by the New York State Court of Appeals.
- July 6, 2006: The Court of Appeals issued a 4–2 decision upholding New York's existing marriage statutes and declining to judicially mandate the legalization of same-sex marriage in New York. The court ruling stated that same-sex partners did not have the right to marry each other under the New York Constitution.

=== Kane case ===
- June 16, 2004: Two same-sex couples filed suit to obtain marriage licenses that would make official their marriage ceremonies from three months earlier. The ceremonies were held by a Unitarian Universalist minister on March 27, 2004.
- January 31, 2005: Albany County Supreme Court Judge E. Michael Kavanagh issued an opinion in Kane v. Marsolais rejecting both statutory and constitutional claims. The opinion also rejected the notion that their marriages were valid because of a section of the domestic relations law that recognized marriages solemnized by ceremonies even if the couple failed to obtain a license. This section of the law was held only to apply to those who were legally qualified to be married.
- October 17, 2005: Oral arguments were heard by the Appellate Division of the Supreme Court, Third Judicial Department.
- February 16, 2006: The Appellate Division affirmed the trial court in a 5–0 decision that consolidated all three cases (Samuels, Seymour, and Kane) on appeal in its jurisdiction.
- May 31, 2006: Oral arguments were heard by the New York State Court of Appeals.
- July 6, 2006: The Court of Appeals issued a 4–2 decision upholding New York's existing marriage statutes and declining to judicially mandate the legalization of same-sex marriage in New York. The court ruling stated that same-sex partners did not have the right to marry each other under the New York Constitution.

== Native American nations ==
Same-sex marriage is legal on the reservation of the St. Regis Mohawk Tribe. A tribal residency ordinance adopted on July 3, 2019, explicitly included same-sex marriages in its definition of marriage, but solely for the purpose of residency rights. On December 21, 2022, the Tribal Council modified the definition of "marriage" in the St. Regis Mohawk Tribe Family Court Code to "a contract between two (2) persons, regardless of their sex, creating a union to the exclusion of all others.", legalizing same-sex marriage on the reservation.

== See also ==
- Empire State Pride Agenda
- History of civil marriage in the United States
- LGBT rights in New York
- LGBT culture in New York City
- List of LGBT people from New York City
- New York Human Rights Law
- NYC Pride March
- Public opinion of same-sex marriage in the United States
- Rights and responsibilities of marriages in the United States
- Same-sex marriage in the United States
- Same-sex marriage law in the United States by state
- Same-sex marriage legislation in the United States
- Same-sex marriage status in the United States by state
- Stonewall riots
