= Dangerous Mathematicians =

Clothing company

- Type: Private
- Industry: Clothing design
- Founded: 2005
- Founder: Karen Patwa
- Defunct: 2017
- Headquarters: Brooklyn, New York, United States
- Products: Women’s tailored suits, women’s wedding suits, women’s formal suits
- Website: dangerousmathematicians.com

Dangerous Mathematicians was an American fashion business founded by Karen Patwa in 2005 and based in Brooklyn, New York. The company designed and sold lesbian wedding suits which blend the masculine elements of a tuxedo with the feminine qualities of a dress.

Dangerous Mathematicians’ name is based on Patwa's career as a math and physics instructor. Geometric principles from math and science serve as sources of inspiration for Dangerous Mathematicians designs.

== History ==
Dangerous Mathematicians first opened its store in 2006 on the Lower East Side of Manhattan. The company originally offered ready made and bespoke professional attire options for “smart women.” The original Rivington Street location frequently hosted themed parties for its clientele featuring photoshoots, fashion shows and math contests. Patwa designed her first women's wedding suit in 2007.

In 2010, the company relocated to Boerum Hill, Brooklyn, in an area where there are many small boutiques.

In response to an increase in demand for wedding suits after the legalization of gay marriage in New York in June 2012, Dangerous Mathematicians' head designer Patwa created a line exclusively geared towards lesbians. By 2013, Dangerous Mathematicians had evolved to focus exclusively on bespoke women's suits.

Dangerous Mathematicians closed in 2017.

== Reception and competitors ==
Dangerous Mathematicians has been featured in a variety of gay-oriented publications such as Wedding Pride, Rainbow Wedding Network, and Huff Post Gay Voices. More recently, other women's suit businesses have introduced themselves to the market, such as Fourteen, Tomboy Tailors, and St. Harridan.
