= Jason West =

American politician (born 1977)

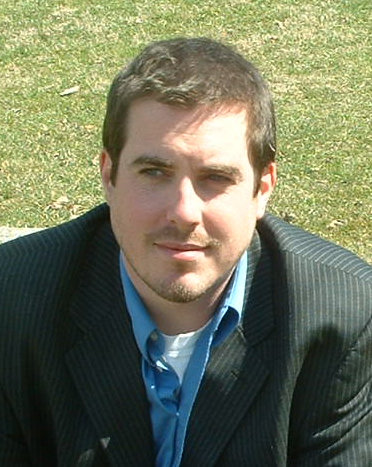

Mayor of New Paltz, New York
- In office June 1, 2011 – May 30, 2015
- Preceded by: Terry Dungan
- Succeeded by: Tim Rogers
- In office June 1, 2003 – May 31, 2007
- Preceded by: Thomas Nyquist
- Succeeded by: Terry Dungan

Personal details
- Born: March 26, 1977 (age 49) Latham, New York, U.S.
- Party: Democrat (since 2020)
- Other political affiliations: Green (until 2020)
- Education: State University of New York at New Paltz; University of California, Berkeley

Jason West (born March 26, 1977) is an American politician who served as mayor of the village of New Paltz, New York, from 2003 to 2007, and again from 2011 to 2015.

A graduate of the State University of New York at New Paltz, West made headlines by solemnizing same-sex marriages in New York. After running as a protest candidate for the New York State Assembly in 2000 and 2002 on the Green Party ticket, West was elected mayor of New Paltz in 2003. He lost his reelection bid on May 1, 2007, to village trustee Terry Dungan.

== Mayoral history ==
=== Summary ===
West was elected as a mayor of New Paltz in 2003 with promises of environmental sustainability, West gained international attention, initially as part of the first Green Party majority elected in New York State and later for risking criminal prosecution to marry 25 same-sex couples.

West was named the Best New Mayor of 2003 by Hudson Valley magazine. He was honored by such organizations as the New York State Senate Democratic Conference, the California State Legislature and community organizations from around the country. He has been profiled in the New York Times Magazine, Plenty, Out, The Advocate, and Jane, among others.

=== Same-sex marriages ===
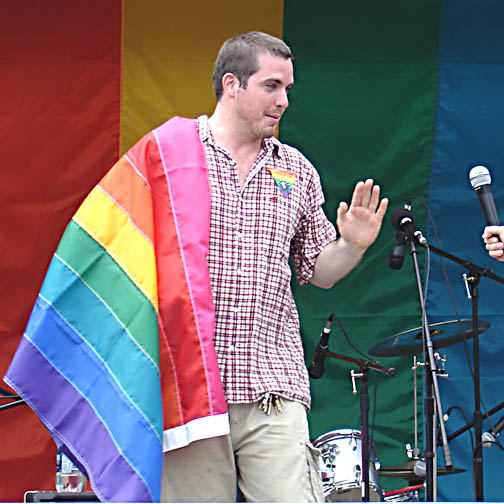
West at a gay rally in 2005

On February 27, 2004, West drew national attention to New Paltz when he announced that he would be performing same-sex marriages. On the first day he performed 24 such ceremonies. On March 2, he was charged with 19 misdemeanor counts of "solemnizing marriages without a license" by Ulster County District Attorney Donald Williams. According to Williams, West was not charged for all 25 ceremonies because police only witnessed 19 of them.

West originally announced that he intended to continue performing same-sex weddings; however, on March 5, New York state judge Vincent Bradley issued a temporary restraining order barring West from performing any such ceremonies for a month. West indicated that he would abide by the judicial order while evaluating his legal options. On June 6, Ulster County Supreme Court Judge Michael Kavanagh made the injunction permanent. West later remarked, "Give it 10 or 20 years when we're holding state legislatures and Congress. It will just be a nonissue."

On June 10, New Paltz Town Court Justice Jonathan Katz dismissed the charges against West, ruling that the district attorney had failed to show that the state had a legitimate interest in preventing the marriages or that the law under which West was charged was constitutional. The district attorney said that he would appeal the ruling.

=== Involvement in the United Nations Urban Environmental Accords ===
As mayor, West took part in the creation of the United Nations Urban Environmental Accords in San Francisco in the Spring of 2005. He is one of 60 mayors from across the world who signed the original accords.

A signatory to the United States Mayors' Climate Protection Agreement and a member of the international network Mayors for Peace, West was also a founding member of the Young Elected Officials Network, a nationwide organization of progressive politicians under 35. He also served on its steering committee.

=== Defeat in 2007 ===
West lost his bid for a second four-year term on May 1, 2007, after a campaign highlighted by an endorsement by Ralph Nader with 514 votes for Dungan to West's 379.

=== Reelection in 2011 ===
West was reelected as mayor of New Paltz on May 3, 2011. His salary at the time was $22,500. West requested a $13,000 raise in 2012. The Village of New Paltz Board of Trustees approved the raise. West requested another $13,000 raise in 2013 but instead had his salary returned to the $22,500 level in a revised budget passed 4–0 by the board, with the mayor absent from voting. In response, West sued the board of trustees. The lawsuit was settled for $12,000 in February 2015.

=== Defeat in 2015 ===
West was defeated by former New Paltz school board member Tim Rogers, who garnered 323 votes, while West received 204 votes. West stated that he was considering the possibility of returning to school for a teaching degree while remaining active in village affairs, and then went about pursuing a Master of Science degree at Bard College.

== Writings ==
- Dare to Hope: Saving American Democracy 2005, ISBN 1-4013-5238-3
