= Martinez v. County of Monroe =

Martinez v. County of Monroe (50 A.D.3d 189; 850 N.Y.S.2d 740) is a decision of the Appellate Court (4th Department) of the State of New York on February 1, 2008, that established that a same-sex marriage performed in another jurisdiction must be recognized by the state of New York. It was the first U.S. court decision to require such recognition.

Patricia Martinez, an employee of Monroe Community College in Monroe County, New York married her same-sex partner in Ontario, Canada. She then applied for health benefits based on her marriage and was denied. The court held that because New York has always recognized out-of-state marriages of different-sex couples, it must provide the same recognition for same-sex couples.

On May 6, 2008, the New York Court of Appeals, New York's highest court, dismissed Monroe County's application for leave to appeal. The Court of Appeals is reported to have refused leave to appeal because the issue of damages between the Martinez family and Monroe Community College had not been resolved.

The decision impacts definitions used in Workforce Investment Act Title IB eligibility determinations. According to the decision, same-sex marriages must be included in the definitions of family, which in turn affects the definitions of eligible youth and displaced homemakers. Furthermore, the act only recognizes marriages that were already legal in their respective jurisdictions.

At the time, same-sex unions that took place in New York State were not legally recognized as marriages in New York State, and therefore did not fall under parameters set by the changes to the act. New York later legalized same-sex marriage, but, at the time, New York was the only state that recognized same-sex marriages established elsewhere, while at the same time not allowing same-sex marriage in its own jurisdiction.

The opinion, written by Justice Erin Peradotto, indicated that

For well over a century, New York has recognized marriages solemnized outside of New York unless they fall into two categories of exception: (1) marriage, the recognition of which is prohibited by the 'positive law' of New York and (2) marriages involving incest or polygamy, both of which fall within the prohibitions of 'natural law'.

The opinion concluded that

plaintiff's marriage does not fall within either of the two exceptions to the marriage-recognition rule. '[A]bsent any New York statute expressing clearly the Legislature's intent to regulate within this State marriages of its domiciliaries solemnized abroad, there is no positive law in this jurisdiction' to prohibit recognition of a marriage that would have been invalid if solemnized in New York.... The Legislature has not enacted legislation to prohibit the recognition of same-sex marriages validly entered into outside of New York, and we thus conclude that the positive law exception to the general rule of foreign marriage recognition is not applicable in this case.

On May 14, 2008, Governor David A. Peterson's legal counsel, David Nocenti, instructed New York state agencies that same-sex couples married elsewhere "should be afforded the same recognition as any other legally performed union," and directed all state agencies to begin to revise policies and regulations to recognize same-sex marriages performed in other jurisdictions.

== See also ==
- Same-sex marriage in New York
- LGBT rights in the United States
