= Kitty Lambert =

American LGBT rights activist

Kitty Lambert is an American LGBT rights activist. She was raised Mormon and married a male Mormon missionary when she was seventeen. She did not come out as a lesbian for many years out of fear of losing her children.

Lambert is president of (and was involved in the founding of) OUTspoken for Equality, an LGBT rights nonprofit in the Western New York area, and as such was instrumental in convincing the New York state legislature to legalize same-sex marriage.

In 2010 Lambert and her partner Cheryle Rudd went to a marriage office in Buffalo, New York to apply for a marriage license, accompanied by a group of supporters. They were refused, but Lambert was given a license to marry a 22-year-old man at the marriage office whom she had never met before. She did not marry him, but the incident was filmed and put on YouTube, where as of July 2011 it had been viewed by 125,000 people.

Over the years, Lambert had three heart attacks, and Rudd had cervical and thyroid cancer. They had difficulty with hospitals due to lack of legal recognition of their relationship.

In 2011 Kitty Lambert and Cheryle Rudd became the first same-sex couple to legally marry in New York. She and Rudd had been together for twelve years prior to their marriage. Niagara Falls Mayor Paul Dyster officiated.
