= Langan v. St. Vincent's Hospital =

2005 New York court decision on same-sex marriage

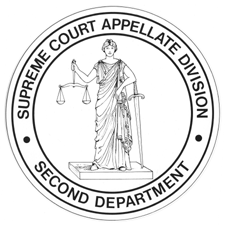
- Seal of the Second Department
- Court: New York Supreme Court, Appellate Division, Second Department
- Full case name: John Langan, Individually and as Executor of Neil Conrad Spicehandler, also known as Neal Spicehandler, Deceased, Respondent, v. St. Vincent's Hospital of New York, Appellant
- Decided: October 11, 2005
- Citation: 25 A.D.3d 90, 802 N.Y.S.2d 476, 2005 N.Y. Slip Op. 07495

Case history
- Appealed from: New York Supreme Court
- Appealed to: New York Court of Appeals

Court membership
- Judges sitting: H. Miller, Schmidt, Lifson, Fisher, Crane

Case opinions
- Same-sex partner in civil union recognized by another state is not a "spouse" under New York law.
- Majority: Lifson, joined by H. Miller, Schmidt
- Dissent: Fisher, joined by Crane

Langan v. St. Vincent's Hospital is a 2005 decision of the New York Supreme Court, Appellate Division, Second Department, which held that a same-sex partner married in a Vermont civil union was not a "surviving spouse" under New York's wrongful death statute and that limiting the statute to heterosexual marriages did not violate the Equal Protection Clause of the Fourteenth Amendment to the United States Constitution or the analogous provision in the New York Constitution.
