= Albert Toney III =

Albert M. Toney III
- Born: October 24, 1966 (age 59); Worcester, Massachusetts

Albert Toney III (born October 24, 1966) is a civil rights activist who retired from the Worcester Massachusetts Police Department after being shot in the line of duty.

== Early life ==
Albert Toney III was born and raised in Worcester, Massachusetts. He is the son of a Massachusetts State Police Sergeant and an elementary school teacher.

In 1987, Toney joined the Worcester Massachusetts Police Department, and in 1991, was wounded in a shooting incident that killed his then life partner, Robert Domiano Jr, and another friend, John Ellison, who later died from the result of his injuries. The shooter was eventually sentenced to life imprisonment for his actions after a nationwide search took place and the perpetrator found. Toney became the first openly gay police officer on the Worcester Police Department and publicly declared that he would focus his efforts on gay civil rights.

He retired from the police force in 1995 as a result of his injuries from the shooting, but continued to educate others on homosexuality and the stigmas attached to being open about it to the public.

In 2001, the Massachusetts Supreme Judicial Court overturned the 1992 first-degree murder conviction of the person who wounded Toney in 1991, and ordered a new trial based on how the original presiding judge instructed the jury on the elements of first-degree murder. On March 31, 2003, the shooter was re-convicted of first-degree murder in the Worcester Superior Court and was again sentenced to life imprisonment.

== Civil rights activism and focus on the LGBT community ==
Albert Toney III began educating and promoting equality for the lesbian, gay, bisexual and transgender (LGBT) community after retiring from the police force as a result of his injuries sustained in a shooting in 1991. He became involved with his future husband, Keith Fitzpatrick, in 1999. The pair were actively involved in the gay civil rights movement, becoming the faces of gay marriage in Massachusetts while educating people about the importance of recognizing gay and lesbian relationships and families. In 2004, they were featured in a documentary, "Same Sex America", that covered the contentious debate over same-sex marriage in Massachusetts. They were also featured in a televised public service announcement, "Its Wrong to Vote on Rights - The Toneys", regarding a proposed ballot initiative within the Massachusetts Legislature that involved gay marriage.

Albert was appointed as co-vice-chair of the Massachusetts Commission Against Discrimination (MCAD) advisory board by Governor Deval Patrick on October 30, 2007.

=== Challenge against the Defense of Marriage Act ===
In 2004, Albert Toney III and Keith Fitzpatrick were legally married in the state of Massachusetts, and became the first same-sex marriage in their town of Holden. In March 2009, they became plaintiffs in a lawsuit filed by GLAD (Gay & Lesbian Advocates & Defenders), Gill v. Office of Personnel Management et al., challenging the constitutionality of the Defense of Marriage Act (DOMA), which prevented the federal government from having to recognize legal state-sanctioned same-gender marriages. Their section of the lawsuit resulted when Keith was subsequently denied a U.S. passport in his new married name after having provided their marriage license as acceptable proof of a legal name change. In June 2009 the Toney's became the first successful challenge against DOMA when the Department of State effectively changed the law so that legal state-sanctioned same-gender marriage licenses would be accepted as proof of a legal name change. This would later become the only successful challenge against DOMA before the Supreme Court of the United States (SCOTUS) ruled on June 26, 2013, that the law was unconstitutional.

=== Challenge to Massachusetts pension laws ===
Albert was also successful in challenging Massachusetts' pension laws when he raised the issue of retirees in same-sex marriages being excluded from being able to cover their spouses because same-sex marriage did not exist, nor was it foreseen, at the time of their retirement. Legislation was approved to allow retirees to change their pension retirement option to one that would pass their retirement benefits on to their spouses in the event of their own death.

== Publications ==
In 2012 the Toney's published a diversity and anti-bullying themed children's story book entitled, "Snions, Stiraffes and Frish...Hooray! Gonzo Finds Fairview Valley". Their efforts of spreading the message of civility, kindness, equality and inclusion to young readers was covered by local news outlets.
