= 2010 in LGBTQ rights =

This is a list of notable events in the history of LGBTQ rights that took place in the year 2010.

== Events ==
=== February ===
- 2 – The United States Tax Court ruled in O'Donnabhain v. Commissioner that taxpayers may deduct the medical costs associated with treating gender identity disorder from their federal income taxes.

=== March ===
- 1 – Crime Decree 2009 decriminalises in Fiji. Fiji became the first Pacific Island country to formally decriminalise homosexuality.
- 2 – The European Court of Human Rights ruled unanimously against "a blanket exclusion of persons living in a homosexual relationship from succession to a tenancy" in Kozak v. Poland.
- 4 – Mexico City's same-sex marriage and adoption laws come into effect. This follows 22 couples' taking part in a symbolic marriage ceremony in Tlaxcala on February 26 to highlight the issue.
- 9 – The first same-sex marriages are performed in the District of Columbia, with licenses having been available since March 3.
- 31
- The Committee of Ministers of the Council of Europe adopts a recommendation on measures to combat discrimination on grounds of sexual orientation or gender identity.
- In Fields v. Smith the United States District Court for the Eastern District of Wisconsin strikes down the state's "Inmate Sex Change Prevention Act". Passed in 2005, the law barred doctors in Wisconsin prisons from prescribing hormone treatment or sex reassignment surgery to transgender inmates. The court finds that denial of treatment absent a medically necessary reason constitutes cruel and unusual punishment.

=== April ===
- 8 – Portugal abolishes the ban on gay and bisexual men donating blood.
- 16 – Arkansas Proposed Initiative Act No. 1, banning adoption by same-sex couples (but not LGBT individuals) is overturned in state court for violating the Constitution of Arkansas right to privacy.
- 29 – The Parliamentary Assembly of the Council of Europe adopts a resolution and a recommendation along lines similar to the March 31 recommendation of its Council of Ministers, "calling on member states to address" an array of issues related to LGBT rights.

=== May ===
- 17 – Amid controversy, a law enabling same-sex marriage in Portugal is promulgated by president Aníbal Cavaco Silva, although adoption is ruled out. The law comes into force on June 5, with the first marriage on June 7.
- 18 – Tiwonge Chimbalanga and Steven Monjeza are convicted in a Malawian court or having committed "unnatural offenses" and "indecent practices between males" under sections 153 and 156 of Malawi's criminal code after local newspapers reported that they had participated in a public same-sex chinkhoswe, or engagement ceremony. Monjeza and Chimbalanga are each sentenced to 14 years hard labour on May 20, but are pardoned by President Bingu wa Mutharika following international pressure and an appeal from United Nations Secretary-General Ban Ki-moon.

=== June ===
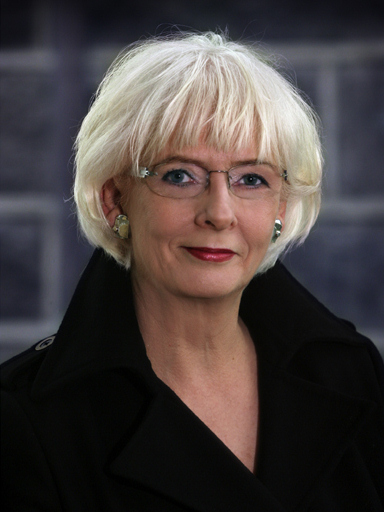
Prime Minister of Iceland Jóhanna Sigurðardóttir

- 2 – United States President Barack Obama issues a memorandum ordering federal departments and agencies to extend spousal benefits to same-sex couples to the extent permitted by the Defense of Marriage Act.
- 24 – In Schalk and Kopf v. Austria, the European Court of Human Rights unanimously finds that a State not legislating for, or recognising, same-sex marriage is not in violation of Article 12 of the European Convention on Human Rights (ECHR). By four votes to three, it ruled that the non-recognition of same-sex relationships was not in violation of the ECHR.
- 27 – Same-sex marriage in Iceland is legalized with Prime Minister Jóhanna Sigurðardóttir and her partner, Jónína Leósdóttir, among the first to make use of the law.
- 28 – The Supreme Court of the United States ruled in Christian Legal Society v. Martinez that public universities may refuse to recognize student organizations with policies that discriminate against LGBT people.

=== July ===
- 1 – Ireland's Dáil Éireann passes the Civil Partnership and Certain Rights and Obligations of Cohabitants Act 2010 without a vote. It passed the Seanad Éireann the next week by 48 votes to 4, completing its passage through the Oireachtas. On July 19, President of Ireland, Mary McAleese, signs the bill into law, creating a form of civil union for same sex couples with most of the rights and duties of marriage, except that civil partners may not adopt or jointly be guardians of a child. The act also provides rights for participants in long-term cohabiting relationships who have not entered into a civil partnership or marriage.
- 6 – Hawaii governor Linda Lingle vetoes Hawaii House Bill 444, which would have established civil unions for same-sex couples in that state.
- 7 – The Supreme Court of the United Kingdom, in HJ and HT v Home Secretary, ruled that the asylum claims of two men based on their fear of being persecuted in their home countries (Iran and Cameroon) because of their homosexuality may not be denied on the basis of their ability to conceal their homosexuality in the so-called "discretion test".
- 8 – United States district court judge Joseph L. Tauro ruled in two separate cases that Section 3 of the Defense of Marriage Act is unconstitutional. In Massachusetts v. United States Department of Health and Human Services Tauro says that the definition of marriage enacted by Congress for federal purposes violates the Tenth Amendment to the United States Constitution and "encroaches upon the firmly entrenched province of the state" by treating some couples with Massachusetts marriage licenses differently than others. In Gill v. Office of Personnel Management brought by Gay & Lesbian Advocates & Defenders, he says the law violates the equal protection of the law guaranteed by the Due Process Clause of the Fifth Amendment to the United States Constitution.
- 15 – The Argentine Senate passes (despite the General Law Committee recommending rejection of the bill) a same-sex marriage bill that had passed in the Chamber of Deputies on May 5. President Cristina Fernández de Kirchner signs the law on July 21. Argentina becomes the tenth country in the world, and third Roman Catholic country, to legalize same-sex marriage, despite heavy criticism from the Church in Argentina amongst others.
- 19 – The United Nations Economic and Social Council voted to accredit International Gay and Lesbian Human Rights Commission (IGLHRC) as a non-governmental organization granted consultative status, allowing IGLHRC to attend UN meetings, contribute statements and collaborate with UN agencies.
- 22- The European Court of Human Rights holds, in P.B. and J.S. v. Austria, that lack of access to insurance for same-sex couple on equal terms with other marriages violates the ECHR.

=== August ===
- 4 – In Perry v. Schwarzenegger, District Judge Vaughn R. Walker ruled that Proposition 8, the state constitutional amendment barring same-sex marriage, violates the "Equal Protection Clause" and the Due Process Clause of the United States Constitution because there is no rational basis for singling out homosexual couples for denial of marriage licenses. The United States Court of Appeals for the Ninth Circuit then issued an emergency stay without explanation on August 16.
- 10 – The Supreme Court of Mexico ruled in quick succession that Mexico City's same-sex marriage law is constitutional, that the same marriages contracted in Mexico City must be recognised throughout Mexico, although no other state is required to perform them, and that it is unconstitutional to bar these married same-sex couples from adopting children.
- 9 – A judge in New Mexico ruled that a marriage license issued to a lesbian couple in 2004 is valid, though she declines to rule on the broader constitutional question of same sex marriage.
- 17 – The Federal Constitutional Court of Germany rules that the surviving partners of registered partnerships are entitled to the same inheritance tax laws as the survivors of marriages. Surviving marital partners previously paid 7–30% inheritance tax while surviving registered partners paid 17–50%.
- 31
  - The Parliament of Tasmania approves legislation to recognise same-sex marriages and registered unions performed outside Tasmania.
  - The Fifth Court of Appeals in Dallas, Texas, reverses a 2009 ruling in a same-sex divorce case, ruling that the Texas constitutional ban on same-sex marriage does not violate the Equal Protection Clause of the Fourteenth Amendment and that district courts in Texas do not have subject-matter jurisdiction to hear a same-sex divorce case.

=== September ===
- 9 – Judge Virginia A. Phillips of the United States District Court for the Central District of California ruled in Log Cabin Republicans v. United States of America that the "don't ask, don't tell" policy violates the Fifth and First Amendments to the United States Constitution. On November 2, the Ninth Circuit Court of Appeal indefinitely extended a temporary stay of the judgment.
- 13 – Chief of the Defence Force of Australia Angus Houston issued an order lifting the ban on transgender personnel.
- 21 – New York Governor David Paterson signed a bill into law allowing unmarried couples, including same-sex couples, to adopt children. The new law also replaces the term "husband and wife" with the gender-neutral "married couple".
- 22 – In In re: Gill, a three-judge panel of the Florida Third District Court of Appeal unanimously strikes down the state's ban on homosexuals as adoptive parents as violating the "equal protection clause" of the Florida Constitution. Florida state attorney Bill McCollum later announced that he would not further appeal against the ruling.
- 29 – Tasmania passes a bill recognizing legal same-sex marriages performed outside Tasmania.

=== October ===
- 5 – Court of First Instance of Hong Kong dismissed a judicial review in W v. Registrar of Marriages filed by a transsexual person, which concerned the constitutionality of marriage legislation and the interpretation of the "one man and one woman" clause.
- 10 – Belgrade anti-gay riot failed to prevent Pride parade in Belgrade from being carried out. Unfortunately, the riot caused serious damage to many individual businesses and to some of city infrastructure.

=== November ===
- 2 – Voters in El Paso, Texas, pass an initiative that strips health insurance benefits from the unmarried partners of city employees. Supporters say that their intention was to target gay city employees and their partners.

=== December ===
- 22 – Following its passage by the United States Congress, President Barack Obama signs the Don't Ask, Don't Tell Repeal Act of 2010 into law.

== Deaths ==
- September 22 – Tyler Clementi, American student, died by suicide after a video of his sexual encounter with a man was streamed over the internet without his knowledge.

== See also ==
- Timeline of LGBTQ history – timeline of events from 12,000 BCE to present
- LGBTQ rights by country or territory – current legal status around the world
- LGBTQ social movements
