= United States v. Rehlander =

- Court: United States Court of Appeals for the First Circuit
- Argued: May 2 2011
- Decided: January 13 2012 Full name: United States of America, Appellee, v. Nathan Rehlander, Defendant, Appellant. United States of America, Appellee, v. Benjamin J. Small, Defendant, Appellant
- Citation: 666 F.3d 45

Court membership
- Judges sitting: Chief Judge Sandra Lynch, Circuit Judges Juan R. Torruella and Michael Boudin

United States v. Rehlander was a 2011 case heard in the United States Court of Appeals for the First Circuit. It struck down a Maine law providing that temporary commitment triggered automatic revocation of a patient's firearms license.

The court held that the firearms ban could only apply to individuals who had received due process through a judicial hearing.
