= Cardona v. Shinseki =

- Court: United States Court of Appeals for Veterans Claims
- Full case name: Carmen J. Cardona, Appellant, v. Eric K. Shinseki, Appellee.
- Citation: CAVC Case Number 11-3083

Case history
- Appealed from: Board of Veterans' Appeals Decision, Docket Number 11-01 921 (August 30, 2011)
- Related actions: Gill v. Office of Personnel Management and Massachusetts v. United States Department of Health and Human Services (1st Cir.) (Note: Gill and Massachusetts were decided in separate opinions in the District Court by the same judge on the same day and a single opinion in the Court of Appeals, which found section 3 unconstitutional. The Supreme Court denied three petitions for certiorari in these cases, docket numbers 12-13, 12-15, and 12-97, on June 27, 2013, following its decision in Windsor.); United States v. Windsor (U.S. Sup. Ct.) (Note: The Supreme Court decided Windsor on June 26, 2013, finding section 3 of the Defense of Marriage Act unconstitutional.); Pedersen v. Office of Personnel Management (2nd Cir.) (Note: Pedersen and Golinski are cases in which district courts held section 3 of DOMA unconstitutional. The Supreme Court denied petitions for certiorari before judgment that sought to bypass the courts of appeals in these cases, filed under docket numbers 12-231, and 12-16, on June 27, 2013, following its decision in Windsor. Pedersen is still pending in the Second Circuit Court of Appeals, while the Ninth Circuit dismissed Golinski on July 23 with the consent of all parties.); Golinski v. Office of Personnel Management (9th Cir.)

Court membership
- Judge sitting: Bruce E. Kasold

Keywords
- Defense of Marriage Act, Fifth Amendment, Equal protection, Tenth Amendment, Bill of Attainder, Same-sex marriage

Cardona v. Shinseki was an appeal brought in the United States Court of Appeals for Veterans Claims (CAVC) of a decision by the Board of Veterans' Appeals upholding the denial of service-connected disability benefits for the dependent wife of a female veteran. The United States Department of Veterans Affairs denied the disability benefits based on the definition of "spouse" as "a person of the opposite sex" under federal statute. On March 11, 2014, the CAVC dismissed the case as moot after the Secretary of Veterans Affairs advised the Court that he would neither defend nor enforce the federal statute. Cardona subsequently received full payment of her spousal benefits, retroactive to her date of application.

== Proceedings in the Department of Veterans Affairs ==
Carmen Cardona, a veteran of the United States Navy, applied in 2010 for service-connected disability benefits for her dependent wife.

The Veterans' Affairs Regional Office in Hartford, Connecticut, declined to recognize Cardona's marriage. Title 38 of the United States Code, which relates to veterans' benefits, defines a "spouse" as "a person of the opposite sex who is a wife or husband". The federal regulation that tracks and implements Title 38 defines "spouse" as "a person of the opposite sex" who meets certain requirements.

Cardona appealed the decision to the Board of Veterans' Appeals (BVA), which confirmed the denial of disability benefits based on its conclusion that Cardona's wife is not a "spouse" for purposes of veterans' benefits even though their marriage is valid under Connecticut law. The BVA did not reach the constitutional issues raised by Cardona's legal counsel because it claimed lack of jurisdiction and legal authority.

== Appeal to the United States Court of Appeals for Veterans Claims ==
On October 13, 2011, Cardona, represented by the Jerome N. Frank Legal Services Organization at Yale Law School, filed an appeal in the CAVC against Eric K. Shinseki, the United States Secretary of Veterans Affairs.

Attorney General Eric Holder informed Congress on February 17, 2012, of his conclusion that the definition of "spouse" in Title 38 of the United States Code violates the equal protection component of the Fifth Amendment to the United States Constitution. Holder explained that neither the Department of Defense nor the Department of Veterans Affairs (DVA) had identified any justifications that would warrant treating Title 38 differently from Section 3 of the Defense of Marriage Act (DOMA), which he previously concluded violates equal protection.

On April 19, 2012, Cardona filed a brief with the court, arguing that Title 38 and Section 3 of DOMA are unconstitutional because they violate the Tenth Amendment and the equal protection component of the Fifth Amendment. Cardona also argued that the statutes are unconstitutional bills of attainder.

In a May 4 letter, DVA informed the speaker of the house that it would not defend the denial of benefits to veterans married to same-sex spouses on equal protection grounds. On May 21, the Bipartisan Legal Advisory Group (BLAG) of the U.S. house of representatives filed an unopposed motion to intervene in the case, which the court granted on May 21. and on August 31 filed a brief defending the constitutionality of the statutes.

Oral argument was originally scheduled for November 29, 2012. On November 8, BLAG requested it be postponed for forty-five days, pending the U.S. Supreme Court's disposition of petitions for writs of certiorari in several other cases challenging the constitutionality of Section 3 of DOMA (Massachusetts v. United States Department of Health and Human Services, Gill v. Office of Personnel Management, Golinski v. Office of Personnel Management, Windsor v. United States, and Pedersen v. Office of Personnel Management). The court granted the delay over Cardona's objections. On December 18, 2012, the court, sua sponte, ordered the case "stayed pending resolution of Windsor or until further order of the Court."

On June 26, 2013, the U.S. Supreme Court issued a 5–4 decision in United States v. Windsor declaring Section 3 of DOMA to be unconstitutional "as a deprivation of the liberty of the person protected by the Fifth Amendment." Nine months later, the CAVC dismissed the appeal in Cardona v. Shinseki as moot after the Secretary of Veterans Affairs advised the Court that he would neither defend nor enforce 38 U.S.C. § 101(31). Cardona subsequently received full payment of her spousal benefits, retroactive to her date of application.

=== Amicus briefs ===
Six amicus ("friend of the court") briefs were filed in the case, all in support of Cardona.

The Connecticut attorney general argued that the federal statutes and regulations violate the Tenth Amendment to the United States Constitution by intruding on the state's sovereign authority to determine the marital status of its citizens and to guarantee all married couples equal rights and benefits under the law.

Vietnam Veterans of America, Iraq and Afghanistan Veterans of America, Servicemembers Legal Defense Network, Service Women's Action Network, Vets4Vets, and Connecticut Veterans Legal Center argued that the federal statutes and regulations violate the equal protection component of the Fifth Amendment to the United States Constitution. They also argued that the interpretation of them by the Department of Veterans Affairs and the Board of Veterans' Appeals was inconsistent with the intent of Congress.

Briefs were also filed by retired military officers, disability rights advocates, law professors, and 15 public interest and legal services organizations. (Note: The 15 organizations are the American Civil Liberties Union, the Asian American Justice Center, The Asian Pacific American Legal Center, the Equality Federation, the Equal Justice Society, the Gay and Lesbian Advocates and Defenders, the Human Rights Campaign, the Human Rights Campaign Foundation, the Lambda Legal Defense and Education Fund, Inc., Legal Momentum, the National Black Justice Coalition, the National Center for Lesbian Rights, the National Gay and Lesbian Task Force, the National Women's Law Center, and the Southern Poverty Law Center.)

== See also ==
- Same-sex marriage in Connecticut
- Same-sex marriage in the United States
- Sexual orientation and the United States military
- LGBT rights in Connecticut
