= Massachusetts v. United States Department of Health and Human Services =

Commonwealth of Massachusetts v. United States Department of Health and Human Services
- Court: United States Court of Appeals for the First Circuit
- Full case name: Commonwealth of Massachusetts v. United States Department of Health and Human Services, et al.
- Argued: April 4 2012
- Decided: May 31 2012
- Citation: 682 F.3d 1

Case history
- Prior history: 698 F.Supp.2d 234 (D.Mass. 2010)
- Subsequent history: Petitions for certiorari filed with the U.S. Supreme Court (No. 12-15 and 12-97) denied.
- Related cases: Gill v. Office of Personnel Management 682 F.3d 1 (1st Cir.) (Note: Gill and Massachusetts were decided in separate opinions in the District Court by the same judge on the same day and a single opinion in the Court of Appeals, which found section 3 unconstitutional. The Supreme Court denied three petitions for certiorari in these cases, docket numbers 12-13, 12-15, and 12-97, on June 27, 2013, following its decision in Windsor.); Golinski v. Office of Personnel Management (9th Cir.) (Note: Pedersen and Golinski are cases in which district courts held section 3 of DOMA unconstitutional. The Supreme Court denied petitions for certiorari before judgment that sought to bypass the courts of appeals in these cases, filed under docket numbers 12-231, and 12-16, on June 27, 2013, following its decision in Windsor. Pedersen is still pending in the Second Circuit Court of Appeals, while the Ninth Circuit dismissed Golinski on July 23 with the consent of all parties.); United States v. Windsor (U.S. Sup. Ct.) (Note: The Supreme Court decided Windsor on June 26, 2013, finding section 3 of the Defense of Marriage Act unconstitutional.); Pedersen v. Office of Personnel Management (2nd Cir.); Cardona v. Shinseki (Vet. App.) (Note: The Court of Appeals for Veterans Claims stayed Cardona, which challenges the constitutionality of section 3 of DOMA and certain federal regulations, pending resolution of Windsor.)

Holding
- Section 3 of DOMA fails a less-deferential rational basis review on Equal Protection Clause claims; the Spending Clause and Tenth Amendment do not proscribe DOMA, but they do influence the analysis of DOMA's justifications under equal protection review.

Court membership
- Judges sitting: Sandra Lynch, Chief Judge, Juan R. Torruella and Michael Boudin, Circuit Judges

Case opinions
- Majority: Boudin, joined by Torruella and Lynch

Laws applied
- U.S. Const. amend. V, XIV; Defense of Marriage Act

Commonwealth of Massachusetts v. United States Department of Health and Human Services 682 F.3d 1 is a United States Court of Appeals for the First Circuit decision that affirmed the judgment of the District Court for the District of Massachusetts in a lawsuit challenging the constitutionality of section 3 of the Defense of Marriage Act (DOMA), the section that defines the terms "marriage" as "a legal union between one man and one woman as husband and wife" and "spouse" as "a person of the opposite sex who is a husband or a wife." Both courts found DOMA to be unconstitutional, though for different reasons. The trial court held that DOMA violates the Tenth Amendment and Spending Clause. In a companion case, Gill v. Office of Personnel Management, the same judge held that DOMA violates the Equal Protection Clause. On May 31, 2012, the First Circuit held the act violates the Equal Protection Clause, while federalism concerns affect the equal protection analysis, DOMA does not violate the Spending Clause or Tenth Amendment.

The First Circuit, anticipating that the parties would seek a review of the decision, stayed its decision. Both the Department of Justice and Commonwealth of Massachusetts asked the U.S. Supreme Court to review the decision by filing petitions for a writ of certiorari. The Supreme Court decided a similar case, United States v. Windsor, on June 26, 2013, and dismissed the petitions the following day.

== Trial proceedings ==
On July 8, 2009, Massachusetts Attorney General Martha Coakley filed suit challenging the constitutionality of section 3 of DOMA in the United States District Court for the District of Massachusetts. It claimed that Congress "overstepped its authority, undermined states' efforts to recognize marriages between same-sex couples, and codified an animus towards gay and lesbian people."

Judge Joseph Tauro heard arguments on May 26, 2010. Massachusetts Assistant Attorney General Maura Healey described how a veteran of the U.S. military sought burial for himself and his same-sex spouse in a veterans' cemetery, which DOMA's definition of marriage prohibits. Tauro asked Christopher Hall, who represented the U.S. Justice Department, if the federal government had an interest in "perpetuating heterosexuality in the graveyard." He also questioned the government's contention that DOMA was an attempt to preserve the 1996 status quo, noting that the government considers the status quo at the time the restriction of marriage to heterosexual couples while another way of describing the status quo in 1996 is that the federal government deferred to each state's definition of marriage and provided no definition of its own. In response to arguments that the federal government has consistently used state definitions of marriage, Hall cited the federal government's definition of marriage in immigration cases without relying on any state's definition.

=== Decision ===
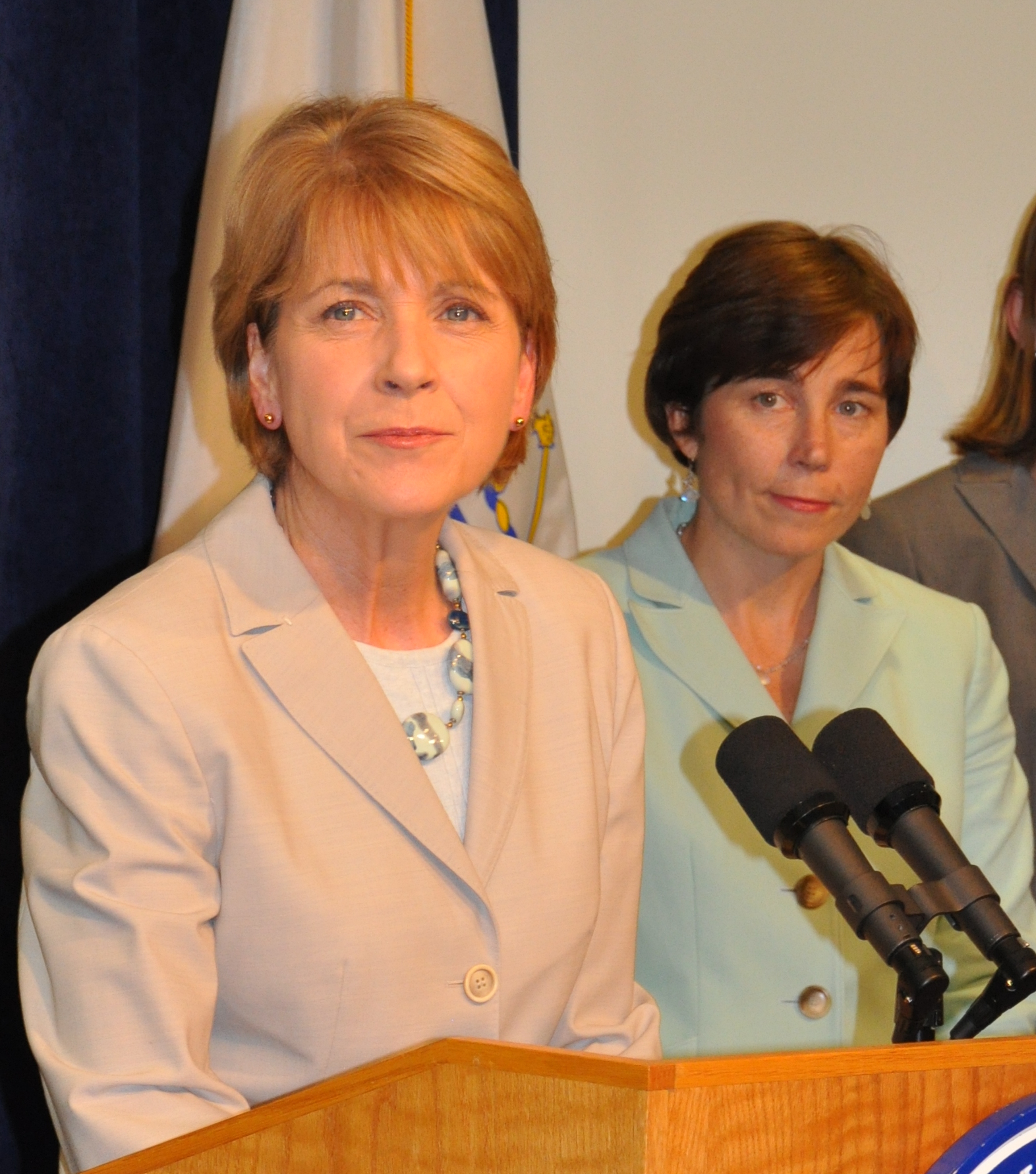
Massachusetts Attorney General Martha Coakley (left) and Assistant Attorney General Maura Healey (right) at a July 8, 2010 press conference on the Massachusetts v. U.S. Dep't of Health & Human Servs. lawsuit challenging the federal Defense of Marriage Act

On July 8, 2010, exactly one year after the suit was filed, Judge Tauro released his decision in the case. He ruled that DOMA section 3 violates the Tenth Amendment and falls outside Congress' authority under the Spending Clause of the Constitution.

In response, Attorney General Coakley said,

Today's landmark decision is an important step toward achieving equality for all married couples in Massachusetts and assuring that all of our citizens enjoy the same rights and protections under our Constitution. It is unconstitutional for the federal government to discriminate, as it does because of DOMA's restrictive definition of marriage. It is also unconstitutional for the federal government to decide who is married and to create a system of first- and second-class marriages. The federal government cannot require states, such as Massachusetts, to further the discrimination through federal programs.

Tauro ruled in a companion case, Gill v. Office of Personnel Management, on the same day, finding part 3 of DOMA unconstitutional on Fifth Amendment grounds. Tauro issued an amended final judgment on August 18, (Note: The original final judgment was issued on August 12, 2010) but he stayed it pending appeal. The text of the decision was developed in consultation with the parties.

== Appeals ==
=== First Circuit ===
On January 14, 2011, the DOJ filed a brief in the First Circuit Court of Appeals that defended DOMA in both this case and the related Gill case. Despite its victory, GLAD supported an appeal, stating "the chance to argue in front of a higher court with a broader reach ... [and] an opportunity to address the harms DOMA Section 3 causes to already married couples across the country." On February 25, the DOJ notified the Court that it would cease to defend both cases. On May 20, 2011, the Bipartisan Legal Advisory Group (BLAG) filed a motion asking to be allowed to intervene to defend DOMA section 3, and leave was granted.

Chief Judge Sandra Lynch and Judges Michael Boudin and Juan Torruella heard arguments in the case on April 4, 2012. On May 31, 2012, they unanimously found section 3 of DOMA unconstitutional, but rejected Tauro's rationale in this case that it violated the Tenth Amendment and the Spending Clause. The Court stayed enforcement of its decision in anticipation of an appeal to the Supreme Court.

=== Supreme Court ===
On June 29, BLAG filed a petition for certiorari with the Supreme Court in Gill. The DOJ filed a petition in this case on July 3, while asking the Supreme Court to review Golinski v. Office of Personnel Management as well. The DOJ's petitions in Gill and Massachusetts raised the question of whether section 3 violates the Equal Protection Clause. In its reply to those petitions, filed on July 20, 2012, Massachusetts proposed the additional questions of whether section 3 violates the Tenth Amendment and the Spending Clause. (Note: At the same time Massachusetts filed its response to the BLAG and DOJ petitions, it filed its own petition for certiorari in case the Supreme Court found its response went beyond the allowable scope for a response. See footnote 1 of the Response.) BLAG on July 30 asked for extension of the August 2 deadline for its responses to the DOJ petition in this case and in Golinski to August 31, which request was granted. (Note: The deadline for a response to the Commonwealth's conditional counter-petition in this case is August 23, and the BLAG request did not mention that petition.) The petition for the writ of certiorari was dismissed after United States v. Windsor was decided.

== See also ==
- 2010 in LGBT rights
