= Pedersen v. Office of Personnel Management =

United States federal lawsuit

- Court: United States District Court for the District of Connecticut
- Full case name: Joanne Pedersen, et al., v. Office of Personnel Management, et al.
- Decided: July 31, 2012
- Citation: 10 CV 1750 (D. Conn. July 31, 2012)

Case history
- Subsequent actions: On appeal to the Second Circuit Court of Appeals (No. 12-3273); Petition for certiorari before judgment filed in the United States Supreme Court (No. 12-231), denied June 27, 2013
- Related actions: Gill v. Office of Personnel Management and Massachusetts v. United States Department of Health and Human Services (1st Cir.) (Note: Gill and Massachusetts were decided in separate opinions in the District Court by the same judge on the same day and a single opinion in the Court of Appeals, which found section 3 unconstitutional. The Supreme Court denied three petitions for certiorari in these cases, docket numbers 12-13, 12-15, and 12-97, on June 27, 2013, following its decision in Windsor.); Golinski v. Office of Personnel Management (9th Cir.) (Note: In Golinski a district court held section 3 of DOMA unconstitutional. While the case was on appeal to the Ninth Citcuit, the Supreme Court denied a petition for certiorari before judgment that sought to bypass that court, filed under docket number 12-16, on June 27, 2013, following its decision in Windsor. The Ninth Circuit dismissed the appeal with the consent of all parties on July 23.); United States v. Windsor (U.S. Sup. Ct.) (Note: The Supreme Court decided Windsor on June 26, 2013, finding section 3 of the Defense of Marriage Act unconstitutional.); Cardona v. Shinseki (Vet. App.) (Note: The Court of Appeals for Veterans Claims stayed Cardona, which challenges the constitutionality of section 3 of DOMA and certain federal regulations, pending resolution of Windsor.)

Holding
- Section 3 of DOMA violates the Equal Protection Clause.

Court membership
- Judge sitting: Vanessa L. Bryant

Keywords
- Defense of Marriage Act, Equal protection, Same-sex marriage, States' rights

Pedersen v. Office of Personnel Management is a federal lawsuit challenging the constitutionality of the Defense of Marriage Act, Section 3, which defined the federal definition of marriage to be a union of a man and a woman, entirely excluding legally married same-sex couples. The District Court that originally heard the case ruled Section 3 unconstitutional. On June 26, 2013, the Supreme Court of the United States ruled Section 3 of DOMA unconstitutional, and denied appeal of Pedersen the next day.

== Legal proceedings ==
Gay and Lesbian Advocates and Defenders (GLAD) filed the case in U.S. District Court on behalf of six same-sex couples and one widower in Connecticut, Vermont, and New Hampshire, making the same arguments it made in Gill v. Office of Personnel Management: that section 3 of the Defense of Marriage Act should be found unconstitutional based on the Fifth Amendment, equal protection, and the federal government's historically consistent deference to state definitions of marriage. It prevents the federal government from recognizing the marriages of same-sex couples who are legally married in their own states or other jurisdictions and restricts the federal government from granting such couples benefits it provides to different-sex married couples.

On February 23, 2011, Attorney General Eric Holder released a memo regarding two lawsuits challenging DOMA section 3, Pedersen v. OPM and Windsor v. United States stating, "After careful consideration, including a review of my recommendation, the President has concluded that given a number of factors, including a documented history of discrimination, classifications based on sexual orientation should be subject to a more heightened standard of scrutiny. The President has also concluded that section 3 of DOMA, as applied to legally married same-sex couples, fails to meet that standard and is therefore unconstitutional. Given that conclusion, the President has instructed the Department not to defend the statute in such cases." However, the administration also announced it intended to continue enforcing the law until its repeal by Congress or until ruled unconstitutional in court.

On April 18, 2011, leaders of the House of Representatives announced they had chosen former United States Solicitor General Paul Clement to defend the case on behalf of the Bipartisan Legal Advisory Group (BLAG). On July 15, the plaintiffs filed a motion for summary judgment. On June 20, 2012, BLAG asked that the case be put on hold pending Supreme Court action on the First Circuit decision in Massachusetts v. United States Department of Health and Human Services and Gill v. Office of Personnel Management, which BLAG was appealing. The Court denied the request on July 4, 2012.

On July 31, Judge Vanessa L. Bryant found for the plaintiffs. She wrote, "[H]aving considered the purported rational bases proffered by both BLAG and Congress and concluded that such objectives bear no rational relationship to section 3 of DOMA as a legislative scheme, the Court finds that no conceivable rational basis exists for the provision."

== Appeals ==
The DOJ appealed the decision to the Second Circuit Court of Appeals on August 17, 2012, and Pedersen filed a petition for certiorari before judgment with the Supreme Court on August 21. On September 11, the Solicitor General filed a similar petition urging the Supreme Court to consider taking the case if the court chooses not to accept either the Golinski or Massachusetts petitions. The Supreme Court denied these petitions on June 27, 2013, following its decision in Windsor.

== Plaintiffs ==
Joanne Pedersen and Ann Meitzen of Connecticut: Joanne is a retired civilian employee of the Department of the Navy and Ann recently retired from work at a service agency for the elderly and disabled due to a chronic lung ailment. Joanne cannot put Ann on her federal employee health insurance plan because of DOMA, which would save them a significant amount of monthly income.

Geraldine and Suzanne Artis of Connecticut: Geraldine, who is studying for a degree in counseling, and Suzanne, a school librarian, have been together for 18 years. They have three sons – a teenager and twin 12-year-olds. Because they cannot file their federal tax returns jointly, they have paid thousands of dollars extra in taxes since they got married in 2009.

Gerald "Gerry" Passaro II of Connecticut: Gerry lost his spouse, Thomas Buckholz, to cancer after more than 13 years together. Gerry, who is disabled and lives on a modest income, was denied Tom's pension and a Social Security death benefit because of DOMA.

Damon "Jerry" Savoy and John Weiss of Connecticut: Jerry is a federal employee with more than 20 years of service and John left his job as an interior designer to be a stay-at-home parent for their three children. Because of DOMA, Jerry can't cover John on his federal employee health insurance plan so they pay an extra 450.00 per month out of pocket for John's health insurance.

James "Flint" Gehre and Bradley Kleinerman of Connecticut: Brad and Flint have been together for more than 20 years. The parents of three boys, they relocated from California to Connecticut to give their kids a better quality of life. But because they cannot file their tax returns jointly they have paid thousands of dollars more in taxes over the course of their three-year marriage.

Janet Geller and Joanne Marquis of New Hampshire: Jan and Jo are retired teachers who have been together since 1979. They both receive pensions through the New Hampshire Retirement System. Because Joanne had more than 30 years of public school service, she is qualified for a health insurance benefit for herself and her spouse. But she was denied the spousal benefit for Jan because of DOMA, which means they pay more for Jan's health care coverage.

Raquel Ardin and Lynda DeForge of Vermont: Raquel and Lynda are military veterans who have been together since 1977. They worked together for many years at the U.S. Postal Service. Raquel suffers from degenerative arthritis in her neck and requires quarterly medical treatments at a VA hospital in Connecticut. Lynda was denied Family Medical Leave Act time off to accompany Raquel to her appointments.

== See also ==
- Same-sex marriage in the United States
