= Golinski v. Office of Personnel Management =

Lawsuit filed in the United States District Court for the Northern District of California

- Court: United States District Court for the Northern District of California
- Full case name: Karen Golinski, Plaintiff, v. Office of Personnel Management, et al., Defendants.
- Decided: February 22, 2012
- Citation: 824 F. Supp. 2d 968

Case history
- Subsequent actions: On appeal in the Ninth Circuit Court of Appeals (Nos. 12-15388 and 12-15409); Petition for certiorari before judgment in the U.S. Supreme Court (No. 12-16), denied June 27, 2013
- Related actions: Gill v. Office of Personnel Management and Massachusetts v. United States Department of Health and Human Services (1st Cir.) (Note: Gill and Massachusetts were decided in separate opinions in the District Court by the same judge on the same day and a single opinion in the Court of Appeals, which found section 3 unconstitutional. The Supreme Court denied three petitions for certiorari in these cases, docket numbers 12-13, 12-15, and 12-97, on June 27, 2013, following its decision in Windsor.); United States v. Windsor (U.S. Sup. Ct.) (Note: The Supreme Court decided Windsor on June 26, 2013, finding section 3 of the Defense of Marriage Act unconstitutional.); Pedersen v. Office of Personnel Management (2nd Cir.) (Note: In Pedersen, a district court held section 3 of DOMA unconstitutional. It is still pending in the Second Circuit Court of Appeals. The Supreme Court denied a petition for certiorari before judgment that sought to bypass that court, filed under docket number 12-231, on June 27, 2013, following its decision in Windsor.); Cardona v. Shinseki (Vet. App.) (Note: The Court of Appeals for Veterans Claims stayed Cardona, which challenges the constitutionality of section 3 of DOMA and certain federal regulations, pending resolution of Windsor.)

Holding
- Section 3 of the Defense of Marriage Act does not substantially relate to an important government interest or rationally relate to a legitimate government end.

Court membership
- Judge sitting: Jeffrey White

Keywords
- Fifth Amendment; equal protection; Defense of Marriage Act; same-sex marriage

Golinski v. Office of Personnel Management, 824 F. Supp. 2d 968 (N.D. Cal. 2012), was a lawsuit filed in the United States District Court for the Northern District of California. The plaintiff, Karen Golinski, challenged the constitutionality of section 3 of the Defense of Marriage Act (DOMA), which defined, for the purposes of federal law, marriage as being between one man and one woman, and spouse as a husband or wife of the opposite sex.

On February 22, 2012, the District Court held section 3 unconstitutional. The case was appealed to the United States Court of Appeals for the Ninth Circuit. The Department of Justice (DOJ), on July 3, 2012, asked the Supreme Court to take the case before the Ninth Circuit decided it, so it could be heard with two other DOMA-related cases, Gill v. Office of Personnel Management and Massachusetts v. United States Department of Health and Human Services.

The Ninth Circuit delayed oral argument pending action by the Supreme Court. Following that Court's decision in United States v. Windsor, the appeal was dismissed on July 23, 2013.

== Background ==
In 2008, when California first extended marriage to same-sex couples, Karen Golinski, an attorney and 19-year employee of the Ninth Circuit Court of Appeals, married Amy Cunninghis. Golinski subsequently applied for family medical insurance coverage through her employer. When the application was denied, she filed a complaint under the Ninth Circuit's Employment Dispute Resolution Plan. Chief Judge Alex Kozinski, in his administrative capacity, ruled in 2009 that she was entitled to spousal health benefits, but the Office of Personnel Management (OPM) announced that it would not comply with the ruling.

== Trial proceedings ==
In January 2010, Golinski filed suit against the OPM in the U.S. District Court for the Northern District of California to enforce Kozinski's order. On March 17, 2011, U.S. District Judge Jeffrey White dismissed the suit on procedural grounds but invited Golinski to amend her suit to argue the unconstitutionality of DOMA Section 3, which she did on April 14.

On February 23, 2011, while the court was still considering the original petition, Attorney General Eric Holder announced that the Justice Department would no longer defend DOMA, but would help ensure Congress had a fair opportunity to defend the law. In response, the U.S. House of Representatives formed the Bipartisan Legal Advisory Group (BLAG) to defend DOMA in this case, as well as Gill v. Office of Personnel Management and Massachusetts v. United States Department of Health and Human Services. On BLAG's behalf, former United States Solicitor General Paul Clement filed a motion to dismiss, raising arguments previously avoided by the Department of Justice that DOMA's definition of marriage is valid "because only a man and a woman can beget a child together, and because historical experience has shown that a family consisting of a married father and mother is an effective social structure for raising children". On July 1, 2011, the DOJ filed a brief in support of Golinski's suit, in which it detailed for the first time its case for heightened scrutiny based on "a significant history of purposeful discrimination against gay and lesbian people, by governmental as well as private entities" and its arguments that DOMA Section 3 fails to meet that standard.

A September 20, 2011, letter from New York Roman Catholic Archbishop Timothy Dolan, which included a three-page analysis by the U.S. Conference of Catholic Bishops, cited the brief as evidence that the DOJ "has shifted ... to actively attacking DOMA's constitutionality". Dolan predicted current federal actions would "precipitate a national conflict between church and state of enormous proportions and to the detriment of both institutions."

White offered to make a video recording of the hearing unless any of the parties objected, which BLAG did.

On February 22, 2012, White ruled for Golinski finding DOMA "violates her right to equal protection of the law under the Fifth Amendment to the United States Constitution." He wrote that Section 3 of DOMA could not pass the "heightened scrutiny" or the "rational basis" test. He wrote,

The Court finds that neither Congress' claimed legislative justifications nor any of the proposed reasons proffered by BLAG constitute bases rationally related to any of the alleged governmental interests. Further, after concluding that neither the law nor the record can sustain any of the interests suggested, the Court, having tried on its own, cannot conceive of any additional interests that DOMA might further.

He ordered that Golinski's wife be allowed to enroll for health care insurance as Golinski's spouse. Tara Borelli, the lead attorney for Lambda Legal, who represented Golinski, said "This ruling ... spells doom for DOMA".

== Appeals ==
On February 24, BLAG filed a notice of appeal to the Ninth Circuit. Based on White's ruling and absent a request to the contrary from BLAG, on March 9 the OPM notified Golinski's insurer that it no longer objected to Golinski's wife enrolling in the Federal Employees Health Benefit Program, the point at issue in Golinski's complaint. On March 26, the DOJ, with the support of Golinski's attorneys, asked the Ninth Circuit to expedite the case by granting en banc review, eliminating the usual review by a three-judge panel. On May 22, 2012, the Ninth Circuit denied the petition.

On July 3, the DOJ filed its response to the Ninth Circuit appeal and at the same time asked the Supreme Court to review the case before the Ninth Circuit decided it (a writ of certiorari before judgment), so it could be heard together with two other cases in which DOMA Section 3 was held unconstitutional, Gill v. Office of Personnel Management and Massachusetts v. United States Department of Health and Human Services. Two weeks later, on July 16, a writ for certiorari before judgment was filed in another DOMA case, Windsor v. United States. Golinski's attorneys supported the DOJ's request for certiorari on July 23. On July 27, 2012, the Ninth Circuit canceled the oral argument scheduled for September 10 and put the case in abeyance pending action by the Supreme Court on the DOJ's certiorari petition. BLAG on July 30 asked for extension of the August 2 deadline for its responses to the DOJ petition in this case and in Massachusetts to August 31, which request was granted. (Note: The deadline for a response to the Commonwealth's conditional counter-petition in Massachusetts is August 23, and the BLAG request did not mention that petition.)

Following the Supreme Court's decision in Windsor that found Section 3 of DOMA unconstitutional, on July 23, with the consent of all parties, the Ninth Circuit dismissed the appeals.

=== Amicus briefs (9th Circuit) ===
In June 2012, two former Republican Attorneys General, Edwin Meese and John Ashcroft, filed an amicus brief ("friend of the court") in the Golinski case. It called the DOJ's decision not to defend DOMA section 3 "an unprecedented and ill-advised departure from over two centuries of Executive Branch practice" and "an extreme and unprecedented deviation from the historical norm". Two similar briefs in defense of DOMA were filed by a group of ten Republican senators and the attorneys general of 14 states.

Several amici curiae briefs were filed in support of the plaintiffs. One filed by 135 members of the U.S. House of Representatives, including Nancy Pelosi and Steny Hoyer, dissenting members of the Bipartisan Legal Advisory Group, argued that the DOMA was not an act of rational, impartial, or constitutional lawmaking. Seventy business, professional, and municipal employers (Note: These include Google, Microsoft, eBay, CBS, Viacom, Levi-Strauss, McGraw-Hill, Starbucks, Xerox, Goodwin Procter, and Baker McKenzie, and the cities of San Francisco, Boston, Los Angeles, Seattle, and New York City) argued that DOMA burdens employers because it creates a conflict between federal and state regulation of same-sex spousal benefits.

Family and child welfare law professors (Note: Their institutional affiliations include Chicago-Kent College of Law, Columbia University, UPenn, Cornell University, George Washington University, Boston University, Emory University, Stanford University, Harvard University, and public state schools from Arizona, California (Los Angeles, Berkeley, Davis), Indiana, Iowa, Maine, Maryland, Michigan, New Jersey, North Carolina, Oregon, and Washington.) argued that DOMA inconsistently and unconstitutionally singles out same-sex couples for discrimination, despite family law tradition to the contrary. Historians from Harvard, Princeton, USC, NYU, Stanford, Duke, Johns Hopkins, and Rutgers argued that DOMA encroached upon the state's domain by inconsistently denying same-sex couples the right to marry while historically allowing states to determine every other requirement for marriage. The Supreme Court denied the petition for certiorari before judgment on June 27, following its decision in Windsor. On July 11, the court asked the parties to advise it how to proceed in light of the decision in Windsor by July 25.

== See also ==
- Same-sex marriage in California
- Same-sex marriage in the United States
