= Julie Rikelman =

Ukrainian-American judge (born 1972)

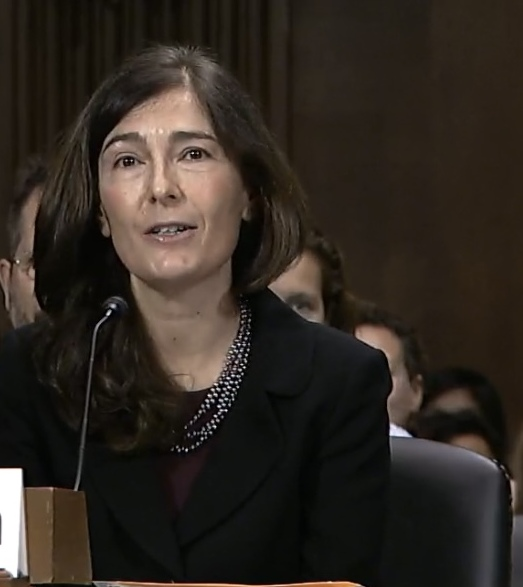

Judge of the United States Court of Appeals for the First Circuit
- Incumbent
- Assumed office June 23, 2023
- Appointed by: Joe Biden
- Preceded by: Sandra Lynch

Personal details
- Born: Yulia Rikelman; June 16, 1972 (age 54) Kyiv, Soviet Union (now Ukraine)
- Education: Harvard University (BA, JD)

Julie G. Rikelman (born June 16, 1972) is a Ukrainian-born American lawyer who is serving as a United States circuit judge of the United States Court of Appeals for the First Circuit. She represented the Mississippi abortion clinic in Dobbs v. Jackson Women's Health Organization, the United States Supreme Court case that overturned the constitutional right to abortion.

== Early life and education ==
Rikelman was born in Kyiv, Ukraine, to Jewish parents, immigrating to the United States with her family in 1979. She received a Bachelor of Arts, magna cum laude, from Harvard College in 1993, and a Juris Doctor, cum laude, from Harvard Law School in 1997.

== Career ==
From 1997 to 1998, Rikelman served as a law clerk for Justice Dana Fabe of the Alaska Supreme Court and from 1998 to 1999, was a law clerk for Judge Morton Ira Greenberg of the United States Court of Appeals for the Third Circuit. From 1999 to 2001, she was a Blackmun Fellow at the Center for Reproductive Rights. From 2001 to 2004, she was an associate at Feldman & Orlansky in Anchorage, Alaska. From 2004 to 2006, she was a senior associate at Simpson Thacher & Bartlett in New York City. From 2006 to 2011, Rikelman held various positions at NBC Universal, Inc., including vice president of litigation. From 2011 to 2023, she was the senior litigation director for the Center for Reproductive Rights.

=== Notable cases ===
Rikelman is well known for her representation and advocacy for abortion providers in federal court challenges such as in June Medical Services LLC v. Russo (2020) and Dobbs v. Jackson Women's Health Organization (2022).

In 2012, Rikelman represented Texas Medical Providers Performing Abortion Services when they sued the commissioner of the Texas Department of State Health Services and the executive director of the Texas Medical Board. The plaintiffs alleged constitutional violations resulting from the newly enacted Texas House Bill 15 ("the Act"), an Act "relating to informed consent to an abortion." H.B. 15, 82nd Leg. Reg. Sess. (Tex.2011).

In December 2014, Rikelman argued in the United States Court of Appeals for the Fourth Circuit for plaintiffs, who included an abortion provider and her patients seeking abortions. At issue was a North Carolina statute that required physicians to perform an ultrasound, display the songram, and describe the fetus to women seeking abortions. In July 2011, the North Carolina General Assembly passed the Woman's Right to Know Act over a gubernatorial veto. The act amended Chapter 90 of the North Carolina General Statutes, which governs medical and related professions, adding a new article regulating the steps that must precede an abortion. Physicians and abortion providers filed suit after the act's passage but before its effective date, asking the court to enjoin enforcement of the act and declare it unconstitutional.

In October 2020, Rikelman was co-counsel representing Whole Woman's Health, Planned Parenthood Center for Choice, Planned Parenthood of Greater Texas Surgical Health Services, Planned Parenthood South Texas Surgical Center, Alamo City Surgery Center, P.L.L.C. and Southwestern Women's Surgery Center on behalf of itself, its staff, physicians, and patients. The case challenged the constitutionality of Texas Senate Bill 8, a statute that requires a woman to undergo an additional and medically unnecessary procedure to cause fetal demise before she may obtain a dilation and evacuation abortion. This case was argued in the United States Court of Appeals for the Fifth Circuit.

In 2021, Rikelman argued in the United States Court of Appeals for the Fourth Circuit for several abortion providers and their patients seeking abortions. The North Carolina abortion providers brought this action to challenge as unconstitutional the state's criminalization of pre-viability abortions.

=== Federal judicial service ===
On July 29, 2022, President Joe Biden announced his intent to nominate Rikelman to serve as a United States circuit judge for the United States Court of Appeals for the First Circuit. On August 1, 2022, her nomination was sent to the Senate. President Biden nominated Rikelman to the seat vacated by Judge Sandra Lynch, who announced her intent to assume senior status upon confirmation of a successor. Rikelman was unanimously rated "well qualified" for the judgeship by the American Bar Association's Standing Committee on the Federal Judiciary. On September 21, 2022, a hearing on her nomination was held before the Senate Judiciary Committee. During her confirmation hearing, she was questioned by several Republican senators over her advocacy for abortion rights. Rikelman was also questioned about a law review article she authored discussing appellate decisions permitting mandatory blood collection for DNA testing under the Fourth Amendment, arguing that such mandatory collection was prohibited by the United States Constitution. On December 1, 2022, the committee failed to report her nomination by an 11–11 vote. On January 3, 2023, her nomination was returned to the President under Rule XXXI, Paragraph 6 of the United States Senate; she was renominated later the same day.

On February 9, 2023, her nomination was reported out of committee by an 11–10 vote. On June 12, 2023, Majority Leader Chuck Schumer filed cloture on her nomination. On June 15, 2023, the Senate invoked cloture on Rikelman's nomination by a 53–45 vote. On June 20, 2023, her nomination was confirmed by a 51–43 vote. She received her judicial commission on June 23, 2023.

== See also ==
- Joe Biden judicial appointment controversies

Legal offices
Preceded by Sandra Lynch	Judge of the United States Court of Appeals for the First Circuit; 2023–present	Incumbent
