= Gill v. Office of Personnel Management =

2012 court decision

- Court: United States Court of Appeals for the First Circuit
- Full case name: Nancy Gill and Marcelle Letourneau, et al., Plaintiffs, v. Office of Personnel Management, et al., Defendants.
- Argued: April 4 2012
- Decided: May 31 2012
- Citation: 682 F.3d 1

Case history
- Prior history: 699 F.Supp.2d 374 (D.Mass. 2010)
- Subsequent history: Petition for certiorari filed with the U.S. Supreme Court (No. 12-13); denied June 27, 2013
- Related cases: Massachusetts v. United States Department of Health and Human Services 682 F.3d 1 (1st Cir.) (Note: Gill and Massachusetts were decided in separate opinions in the District Court by the same judge on the same day and a single opinion in the Court of Appeals, which found section 3 unconstitutional. The Supreme Court denied three petitions for certiorari in these cases, docket numbers 12-13, 12-15, and 12-97, on June 27, 2013, following its decision in Windsor.); Golinski v. Office of Personnel Management (9th Cir.) (Note: Pedersen and Golinski are cases in which district courts held section 3 of DOMA unconstitutional. The Supreme Court denied petitions for certiorari before judgment that sought to bypass the courts of appeals in these cases, filed under docket numbers 12-231, and 12-16, on June 27, 2013, following its decision in Windsor. Pedersen is still pending in the Second Circuit Court of Appeals, while the Ninth Circuit dismissed Golinski on July 23 with the consent of all parties.); Windsor v. United States (U.S. Sup. Ct.) (Note: The Supreme Court decided Windsor on June 26, 2013, finding section 3 of the Defense of Marriage Act unconstitutional.); Pedersen v. Office of Personnel Management (2d Cir.); Cardona v. Shinseki (Vet. App.) (Note: The Court of Appeals for Veterans Claims stayed Cardona, which challenges the constitutionality of section 3 of DOMA and certain federal regulations, pending resolution of Windsor.)

Holding
- Section 3 of DOMA fails a less-deferential rational basis review on Equal Protection Clause claims; the Spending Clause and Tenth Amendment do not proscribe DOMA, but they do influence the analysis of DOMA's justifications under equal protection review.

Court membership
- Judges sitting: Sandra Lynch, Chief Judge, Juan R. Torruella and Michael Boudin, Circuit Judges

Case opinions
- Majority: Boudin, joined by Torruella and Lynch

Laws applied
- U.S. Const. amend. V, XIV; Defense of Marriage Act

Gill et al. v. Office of Personnel Management, 682 F.3d 1 (1st Cir. 2012) is a United States Court of Appeals for the First Circuit decision that affirmed the judgment of the District Court for the District of Massachusetts in a lawsuit challenging the constitutionality of section 3 of the Defense of Marriage Act (DOMA), the section that defines the term "marriage" as "a legal union between one man and one woman as husband and wife" and "spouse" as "a person of the opposite sex who is a husband or a wife."

The trial began on May 6, 2010, and was heard by District Judge Joseph Louis Tauro. On July 8, Tauro ruled section 3 of DOMA unconstitutional in a summary judgment. He later stayed the implementation of his decision pending appeal, and the Department of Justice (DOJ) filed an appeal on October 12, 2010.

In May 2012, the First Circuit Court of Appeals unanimously affirmed Tauro's ruling that section 3 of DOMA is unconstitutional. On June 29, the Bipartisan Legal Advisory Group (BLAG), an arm of the U.S. House of Representatives that is defending the suit, asked the Supreme Court to review the case. The DOJ did so on July 3 and the plaintiffs' attorneys did so on August 2. The United States Supreme Court denied those petitions on June 27, 2013, in the wake of its landmark decision in Windsor v. United States that Section 3 of DOMA was unconstitutional.

== Plaintiffs ==
The original plaintiffs were eight same-sex couples and three widowers, all of whom had married in Massachusetts. They claimed that various government agencies had denied their applications for benefits that would have been granted to similarly situated different-sex couples or the surviving spouse of such a marriage. Their specific claims covered:

- health benefits due the spouse or surviving spouse of a current or retired federal employee
- retirement benefits due the surviving spouse of a civilian federal employee
- the ability to file federal income taxes with the Internal Revenue Service as a married couple or to contribute to a spousal IRA
- Social Security benefits, including one-time lump-sum death benefit payments to a surviving spouse or monthly retirement benefits

One plaintiff sought a passport re-issued in his married name, a procedure that the State Department approved in May 2009.

== Legal Proceedings ==
On March 3, 2009, Gay & Lesbian Advocates & Defenders (GLAD) filed Gill in federal district court. The complaint argued that Section 3 of the Defense of Marriage Act (DOMA) should be found unconstitutional based on the Fifth Amendment, equal protection, and the federal government's historically consistent deference to state definitions of marriage. Section 3 defines the terms "marriage" and "spouse" for the purposes of federal law. It prevents the federal government from recognizing the marriages of same-sex couples who are legally married in their own states and restricts the federal government from granting such couples any federal benefits it provides to opposite-sex married couples.

On July 8, 2010, U.S. District Judge Joseph Tauro found for the plaintiffs, saying,

As irrational prejudice plainly never constitutes a legitimate government interest, this court must hold that Section 3 of DOMA as applied to Plaintiffs violates the equal protection principles embodied in the Fifth Amendment to the United States Constitution.

Tauro's decision found section 3 failed rational basis review. While the plaintiffs had asked Tauro to find that sexual orientation was a suspect class and therefore properly treated with strict scrutiny, Tauro's found that section 3 was unconstitutional on rational basis grounds. He did not address the question of whether heightened scrutiny was warranted.

Tauro issued a decision in Massachusetts v. United States Department of Health and Human Services, which found the same provision of DOMA was also unconstitutional on Tenth Amendment and Spending Clause grounds, on the same day he released his opinion in Gill.

Tauro entered his final judgment–a document developed in consultation with the parties to the case–on August 18 and granted a stay for the duration of the appeals process. Plaintiffs did not oppose the stay. Tauro originally entered his final judgment on August 12, but amended it on August 18. He ordered federal officials to permit several of the plaintiffs to enroll their spouses in various benefit programs and the IRS to process tax returns from several of the couples on the basis of their married status. With respect to Social Security claims, Tauro ordered that plaintiffs' applications for monthly benefits and for lump-sum death benefit payments be reviewed without considering section 3 of DOMA.

== Appeals ==
=== First Circuit ===
On January 14, 2011, the Department of Justice (DOJ) filed a single brief in the First Circuit Court of Appeals that defended DOMA in both Gill and the related case brought by the Commonwealth of Massachusetts. GLAD welcomed the appeal, saying it provided "the chance to argue in front of a higher court with a broader reach ... [and] an opportunity to address the harms DOMA Section 3 causes to already married couples across the country." On February 25, the DOJ notified the Court that it would cease to defend both cases. On April 18, 2011, leaders of the House of Representatives announced they had hired former United States Solicitor General Paul Clement to defend the case. On May 20, 2011, BLAG filed a motion asking to be allowed to intervene to defend DOMA section 3. GLAD and the DOJ did not oppose the request. The Court set a briefing scheduled to be completed by the end of September.

On June 21, 2011, plaintiffs filed a petition for en banc review to expedite the case by moving it more quickly through the judicial review process. On July 7, the DOJ supported that petition and argued that DOMA section 3 requires heightened scrutiny review and will fail to meet that standard. In its response filed the same day, BLAG agreed to the plaintiffs' request provided that other cases are consolidated with it, notably Massachusetts, and that the briefing schedule be revised. It said that "a definitive determination of Section 3's constitutionality by the Supreme Court seems all but inevitable. It is in all parties' interest that the Supreme Court resolve this issue sooner, rather than later." BLAG also requested consolidation with a third case, that of Dean Hara, one of the original Gill plaintiffs, whose case raised some distinct issues. In their briefs, the parties disputed whether there was a First Circuit precedent to the effect that sexual orientation as a classification is subject to intermediate scrutiny. In a tie vote, the First Circuit denied the request for en banc review.

GLAD filed its appellate brief on October 28, 2011. Responses from the DOJ and BLAG were filed December 1, 2011. Chief Judge Sandra Lynch and Judges Juan R. Torruella and Michael Boudin heard arguments in the case on April 4, 2012. On May 31, 2012, the First Circuit panel affirmed Tauro's ruling, unanimously finding section 3 of DOMA unconstitutional. Boudin concluded the decision by saying,

Many Americans believe that marriage is the union of a man and a woman, and most Americans live in states where that is the law today. One virtue of federalism is that it permits this diversity of governance based on local choice, but this applies as well to the states that have chosen to legalize same-sex marriage. Under current Supreme Court authority, Congress' denial of federal benefits to same-sex couples lawfully married in Massachusetts has not been adequately supported by any permissible federal interest.

The Court stayed enforcement of its decision in anticipation of an appeal to the Supreme Court.

=== Supreme Court ===
On June 29, 2012, BLAG filed a petition for certiorari with the Supreme Court in this case and Massachusetts. The DOJ did so on July 3, while asking the Supreme Court to review Golinski v. Office of Personnel Management as well. The DOJ's petitions in Gill and Massachusetts raised the question of whether section 3 violates the Equal Protection Clause. In its reply to those petitions, Massachusetts proposed the additional questions of whether section 3 violates the Tenth Amendment and the Spending Clause. GLAD filed its response on August 2, supporting the request for Supreme Court review but disputing many of BLAG's contentions.

The Supreme Court declined to review the case and denied these petitions for a writ of certiorari on June 27, 2013. The court's decision on the previous day in Windsor v. United States, holding Section 3 of the Defense of Marriage Act unconstitutional, covers the issues raised in the Gill case.

== See also ==
- Cook v. Gates, First Circuit decision concerning the "don't ask, don't tell" policy
- Same-sex marriage in the United States
