= Tim Coco =

Timothy John Coco
- Born: Timothy John Coco; April 30, 1961 (age 65); Lawrence, Massachusetts, U.S.
- Education: Lesley University (B.S.); Northern Essex Community College
- Occupation: Advertising agency executive
- Spouse(s): Genesio Januario Oliveira, Jr. (2005–present)

Timothy John Coco (born April 30, 1961) is an American business executive, Internet radio pioneer and civil rights activist. He founded COCO+CO., Inc. in 1991 and continues to lead the advertising agency as president and chief executive officer. He gained international notoriety between 2007 and 2010 when he fought—ultimately successful—to be reunited with his same sex spouse when the United States' Defense of Marriage Act (DOMA) separated them.

== Early life and education ==
Tim Coco was born in Lawrence, Massachusetts, to Joseph, owner of a plumbing and heating company, and Annie, a homemaker.

Coco is a life-long Haverhill, Massachusetts resident. He attended Haverhill Public Schools and graduated from Haverhill High School in 1979. He received his associate degree from Northern Essex Community College, Haverhill, Mass., and Bachelor's from Lesley University, Cambridge, Massachusetts.

At the age of 17, Coco became an intern at WHAV Broadcasting Co., Haverhill, owner and operator of WHAV (AM) and then-WHAV-FM. By the time of his graduation from high school, he was a full-time employee of the news department. In 1981, he became a staff writer for the Scripps League Newspapers, Inc.-owned Haverhill Gazette. In 1985, he joined the then-Ottaway Newspapers, Inc.-owned Daily News of Newburyport as staff writer.

While working at the Daily News of Newburyport, he was recruited by David Sokol of Ogden Corporation, New York, to develop community relations and marketing strategies for the company and serve as its spokesman.

== Personal life ==
Shortly after Massachusetts permitted same-sex marriage, Coco married Genesio J. Oliveira Jr. in 2005. Coco and Oliveira, a citizen of Brazil, met in 2002 while the latter was visiting Boston, Massachusetts. Immigration Judge Francis L. Cramer and, later, the Board of Immigration Appeals refused to recognize the marriage, citing the U.S. Defense of Marriage Act (DOMA).

Oliveira was ordered to “voluntarily” depart the U.S. within 60 days and he complied Aug. 17, 2007, beginning what would be a three-year fight by the couple to be reunited. Coco used his advertising skills to launch an international campaign even as civil rights groups predicted the strategy would be unsuccessful. The couple created a website, www.reunitethisfamily.com; held candlelight vigils; won editorial coverage of their plight, posted videos online; placed an advertisement in Washington Post's Express newspaper, asking President Bush and Congress to “Make This Right!”

"We didn't go into it to be activists, we went into it to be together," Coco told the Associated Press in 2009.

The campaign caught the attention of former presidential candidate and then-Senator John F. Kerry (D-Massachusetts) in 2008. After the election of President Barack Obama, Kerry worked with United States Department of Homeland Security Secretary Janet A. Napolitano and Attorney General Eric Holder to arrange humanitarian Parole (United States immigration) — “a rare exemption that allows otherwise ineligible people into the country,” according to the Boston Globe.

On June 2, 2010, Oliveira stepped onto U.S. soil. At about the same time, Francis L. Cramer—the immigration judge that first refused to recognize the Coco-Oliveira marriage—retired. According to a July 28, 2008 U.S. Department of Justice report, “An Investigation of Allegations of Politicized Hiring by Monica Goodling and Other Staff in the Office of the Attorney General,” confirmed Cramer was an illegal appointment, lacked basic immigration experience and apparently passed the DOJ's anti gay litmus test which favored immigration judges who espoused conservative priorities.

Coco may have also played a role in the withdrawal of Senator Judd Gregg (R-N.H.) as U.S. commerce secretary by President Obama. He detailed for the media Gregg's role in having his former campaign treasurer, Cramer, appointed as immigration judge. Coco went on to file a complaint with the Senate Select Committee on Ethics.

== COCO+CO., Inc. ==
At Ogden, Coco was one of the first to embrace integrated corporation communications—the concept of combining the previously discrete business functions of advertising, public relations, marketing communications, investor relations and regulatory affairs. In 1991, he founded COCO+CO. to share this concept with other industries.

In 2012, Coco wrote, “…messages crafted by separate advertising agencies, public relations firms and printers send inconsistent and confusing messages to prospects. Even business logos tended to disproportionately stretch or condense or appear in differing colors as each outside firm made different interpretations. With today's addition of the World Wide Web, social media, mobile devices, e-newsletters and other means of reaching audiences, the problem has grown exponentially.”

Coco reasoned, “To be successful, businesses must simply send relevant messages by vehicles most likely to reach target audiences. Unfortunately, this is neither the advice nor the services businesses receive because of the economic self interests and the conflicts of interests of their advisors.”

== Internet radio ==
After the wave of mergers and consolidations struck the radio industry following passage of the Telecommunications Act of 1996, WHAV was merged into a small group of radio stations and ceased its traditional local programming. The WHAV call sign disappeared completely at the end of 2002. Coco resurrected the call as an Internet radio and cable television station Jan. 3, 2004 and federally trademarked the name in 2008.

Although able to reach the world, Coco returned the station to its hyperlocal roots, restoring staple programs such as local news, Open Mike Show, community calendar, local weather, etc.

In 2011, Coco spun WHAV off into a new nonprofit corporation, Public Media of New England, Inc. He continues to serve as volunteer president and general manager. In the fall of 2013, Coco submitted WHAV's application to the Federal Communications Commission for an LPFM license at 98.1 MHz. The station signed on at 97.9 FM in September, 2016.

== Politics ==
Coco ran for Massachusetts state senate in 2012. While he won every precinct by a "landslide" in the largest city of the First Essex District, Haverhill, he narrowly lost the Democratic primary election by 704 votes to Kathleen O'Connor Ives.
