= Sandra Lynch =

American judge (born 1946)

Senior Judge of the United States Court of Appeals for the First Circuit
- Incumbent
- Assumed office December 31, 2022

Chief Judge of the United States Court of Appeals for the First Circuit
- In office June 16, 2008 – June 16, 2015
- Preceded by: Michael Boudin
- Succeeded by: Jeffrey R. Howard

Judge of the United States Court of Appeals for the First Circuit
- In office March 17, 1995 – December 31, 2022
- Appointed by: Bill Clinton
- Preceded by: Stephen Breyer
- Succeeded by: Julie Rikelman

Personal details
- Born: July 31, 1946 (age 79) Oak Park, Illinois, U.S.
- Party: Democratic
- Education: Wellesley College (BA); Boston University (JD)

Sandra Lea Lynch (born July 31, 1946) is an American lawyer who serves as a senior United States circuit judge of the United States Court of Appeals for the First Circuit. She is the first woman to serve on that court. Lynch served as chief judge of the First Circuit from 2008 to 2015.

== Early life and education ==
Lynch was born in Oak Park, Illinois. She received a Bachelor of Arts from Wellesley College in 1968, and a Juris Doctor from the Boston University School of Law in 1971. She was an editor of the Boston University Law Review.

== Professional career ==
From 1971 to 1973, Lynch served as a law clerk for Judge Raymond James Pettine of the U.S. District Court for the District of Rhode Island. At the time, a woman law clerk was so unusual that Lynch was profiled in a Boston Evening Globe article. She then went on to serve as an assistant state attorney general for the Commonwealth of Massachusetts from 1973 to 1974 and general counsel for the Massachusetts Department of Education from 1974 to 1978.

Lynch was in private practice from 1978 until being appointed to the First Circuit. Lynch was a partner at the law firm of Foley, Hoag, & Eliot at their Boston office, and the first woman to lead the firm's litigation department. At Foley, Hoag, Lynch was part of the team that represented W.R. Grace in the connection with a groundwater contamination lawsuit later profiled in the work A Civil Action. Lynch was also involved in the Boston school desegregation litigation.

She served as an instructor at the Boston University Law School from 1973 to 1974 and as special counsel to the Judicial Conduct Commission of Massachusetts from 1990 to 1992.

From 1992 to 1993, Lynch served as president of the Boston Bar Association.

== Federal judicial service ==
President Bill Clinton nominated Lynch to the U.S. Court of Appeals for the First Circuit on September 19, 1994, but the United States Senate never voted on the nomination. Clinton renominated Lynch on January 11, 1995, to fill the seat vacated by Judge Stephen Breyer, who was elevated to the Supreme Court of the United States on August 3, 1994. The American Bar Association's Standing Committee on the Federal Judiciary, which rates judicial nominees, unanimously rated Lynch as "well qualified" (the committee's highest rating). She was confirmed by the Senate on March 17, 1995, by a voice vote, and received her commission on the same day. She served as chief judge from 2008 to 2015, and as a member of the Judicial Conference of the United States over the same period. In February 2022, Lynch announced plans to assume senior status upon the confirmation of a successor. She assumed senior status on December 31, 2022.

=== Notable rulings ===
In 1996, Lynch issued a noted dissent from the denial of rehearing en banc in a case in which an all-male First Circuit panel held that a rape committed at gunpoint by a carjacker did not constitute "serious bodily injury" for purposes of a federal sentencing enhancement. In a strongly worded dissent, Lynch wrote that Congress clearly intended "serious bodily injury" to include abduction and rape. Within several months, Congress clarified the statute to adopt Lynch's position; Senator Edward M. Kennedy publicly credited Lynch's dissent for prompting the change in the law.

In Natsios v. National Foreign Trade Council (1998), Lynch wrote an opinion striking down Massachusetts's "Burma law"—an act, enacted two years earlier, that barred state agencies from contracting with companies that do business in Burma (Myanmar), due to that nation's poor human rights record. Lynch found that the state law unconstitutionally intruded into the federal government's power to conduct foreign policy. In Crosby v. National Foreign Trade Council (2000), a unanimous Supreme Court affirmed this ruling, agreeing that state statute was "invalid under the Supremacy Clause of the National Constitution owing to its threat of frustrating federal statutory objectives".

In 2006, Lynch found that trading a gun for drugs constitutes a "use" of a gun for purposes of a criminal law against using a firearm in relation to drug trafficking. Her ruling was later abrogated by the Supreme Court's decision in Watson v. United States (2007).

In Massachusetts v. United States Department of Health and Human Services (2012), Lynch joined a unanimous panel in holding (in an opinion written by Judge Michael Boudin) that the Defense of Marriage Act (DOMA) was an unconstitutional violation of the equal protection principles of the Fifth Amendment, because it denied to same-sex couples the federal benefits enjoyed by opposite-sex couples.

On October 19, 2021, Lynch wrote the majority opinion that upheld Maine's vaccine mandate for health care workers. The Supreme Court refused to review that decision.

== Awards and honors ==
Lynch received an Alumnae Achievement Awards from Wellesley College in 1997, and the Haskell Cohn Distinguished Judicial Service Award from the Boston Bar Association in 2011.

== Personal life ==
Lynch is married and has one son; she lives in the North End, Boston.

Legal offices
Preceded by Stephen Breyer	Judge of the United States Court of Appeals for the First Circuit; 1995–2022	Succeeded by Julie Rikelman
Preceded by Michael Boudin	Chief Judge of the United States Court of Appeals for the First Circuit; 2008–2015	Succeeded by Jeffrey R. Howard
