= GLBTQ Legal Advocates & Defenders =

American nonprofit organization

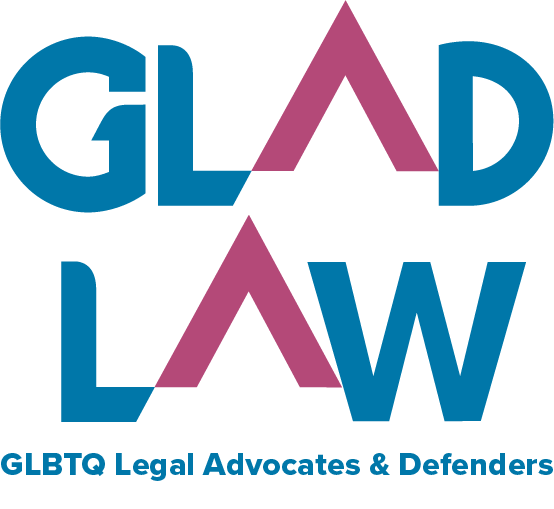
- Formation: 1978
- Purpose: LGBT rights
- Headquarters: Boston, Massachusetts (United States)
- Region served: United States
- Website: www.gladlaw.org

GLBTQ Legal Advocates & Defenders (GLAD Law) is a non-profit legal rights organization in the United States. The organization works to end discrimination based on sexual orientation, HIV status, and gender identity and expression. The organization primarily achieves this goal through litigation, legislation, and educational work in all areas of LGBTQ (lesbian, gay, bisexual, transgender) rights and the rights of people with HIV. In addition, GLAD Law also operates a legal information line, GLAD Law Answers, where LGBTQ & HIV-positive people in New England can receive attorney referrals and information about their rights.

GLAD Law has won two landmark cases before the United States Supreme Court, that expanded national LGBTQ rights, including Obergefell v. Hodges, which guaranteed the right for same-sex couples to marry, and Bragdon v. Abbot, which established that people with HIV are protected by the Americans with Disabilities Act.

GLAD Law is based in Boston, Massachusetts, and works nationally and in states across the country. The organization changed its name from Gay & Lesbian Advocates & Defenders to GLBTQ Legal Advocates & Defenders in February 2016. Its shorthand changed from GLAD to GLAD Law in October 2024

GLAD Law furthers its mission through:

- Litigation
- Public policy advocacy
- Public education
- Direct community legal information and referrals: GLAD Law Answers

== Background ==
GLAD Law was originally called Gay & Lesbian Advocates & Defenders. It was founded by John Ward in 1978, in response to a sting operation conducted by Boston police that resulted in the arrest of more than a hundred men in the men's rooms of the main building of the Boston Public Library. GLAD Law filed its first case, Doe v. McNiff, that same year and eventually all those arrested were either found not guilty or had the charges against them dismissed. An early victory came in Fricke v. Lynch (1980), in which GLAD Law represented Aaron Fricke, an 18-year-old student at Cumberland High School in Rhode Island, who won the right to bring a same-sex date to a high school dance.

== Notable cases ==
Same-Sex Discrimination

- Fricke v. Lynch: GLAD Law founder John Ward won a ruling from the U.S. District Court for Rhode Island on May 28, 1980, that the U.S. Constitution's guarantee of free speech prohibits a public school from denying a student the right to attend a school prom with a same-sex date.
- Hurley v. GLIB: GLAD Law founder John Ward became the first openly gay man to argue in front of the Supreme Court. The case was in defense of the rights of Irish-American Gay, Lesbian, Bisexual Group of Boston to march in South Boston's annual St. Patrick's Day parade. Massachusetts courts had affirmed that the group had the right to march. In 1995, the U.S. Supreme Court reversed the decisions of the Massachusetts court, saying that the private group organizing the parade had a First Amendment right to decde which groups could and could not participate.
- DeBoer v. Snyder (2015): GLAD Law's Civil Rights Project Director, Mary Bonauto, argued in front of the U.S. Supreme Court on April 28, 2015, on behalf of same-sex couples seeking the right to marry. This case was consolidated with Obergefell v. Hodges, and concluded in the landmark 5-4 Supreme Court decision guaranteeing a right to marriage.

HIV/AIDS Rights

- Bragdon v. Abbott: In 1995, GLAD Law's case established that people with HIV and AIDS are protected by the Americans with Disabilities Act (ADA). It was the first case that the U.S. Supreme Court had ever heard on the ADA, and the first involving HIV.

Transgender Rights

- Doe v. Yunits: In 2000, GLAD Law brought a case to the Massachusetts Superior Court on behalf of a transgender student, Katrina, who had been disciplined for wearing the clothing that matched her female identity. The Superior Court ruled that a middle school may not prohibit a transgender student from expressing her female gender identity. It was the first reported decision in a case brought by a transgender student.
- O'Donnabhain v. Commissioner of Internal Revenue: On February 2, 2010, the U.S. Tax Court ruled that treatment for gender dysphoria qualifies as medical care under the Internal Revenue Code and is therefore tax deductible.
- Doe v. Regional School Unit 26 (2014): The Maine Supreme Judicial Court ruled that denying a transgender girl the use of a girls' restroom at her school violated her rights under the state's Human Rights Act. This case marked the first time that a state court ruled denying a transgender student access to the bathroom consistent with their gender identity is unlawful.
- Doe v. Trump (2017): The suit sought to block Donald Trump and top Pentagon officials from implementing the proposed ban on military service for transgender people under the auspices of the equal protection and due process clauses of the Fifth Amendment. On January 25, 2021, President Biden issued an executive order lifting the ban on transgender military service. On August 20, 2021, the court dismissed the case with prejudice.

== Work on marriage equality ==
In 1997, GLAD Law, along with Beth Robinson and Susan Murray filed a lawsuit, Baker v. Vermont on behalf of three Vermont couples seeking the right to marry. On December 20, 1999, The Vermont Supreme Court ruled that same-sex couples must be granted the same legal benefits, protections, and obligations as marriage under Vermont law. As a direct result of this decision in 2000 Vermont became the first state to allow same-sex couples to enter a legal relationship equal to marriage, known in Vermont as a civil union.

In 2003, GLAD Law received national attention for its work in winning marriage rights for same-sex couples in Massachusetts. In Goodridge v. Department of Public Health, it successfully argued before the Massachusetts Supreme Judicial Court that to restrict marriage to heterosexual couples was a violation of the state constitution. In October 2008, GLAD Law won marriage rights for same-sex couples in Connecticut with a decision of the Supreme Court of Connecticut in Kerrigan v. Commissioner of Public Health.

On November 18, 2008, the fifth anniversary of Goodridge, GLAD Law, working with other statewide groups, launched a project called the "Six by Twelve" campaign that aimed to bring same-sex marriage to all six New England states by 2012. The campaign aimed to make New England a "marriage equality zone." The campaign worked primarily through state legislatures and hoped to provide a road map for the rest of the country in 2012. Within six months, same-sex marriage laws were passed in three more states, but the Maine law was repealed by the voters on November 3, 2009. After this decision by the voters, along with a coalition of other civil rights groups, GLAD Law proceeded with a two-year public education campaign in Maine. On June 30, 2011, EqualityMaine and GLAD Law announced plans to place a voter initiative in support of same-sex marriage on Maine's November 2012 ballot. The voter initiative passed, making Maine the first state to legalize same sex marriage through a ballot vote. On May 2, 2013, the "Six by Twelve" campaign came to a close when Rhode Island's legislature passed a bill allowing same-sex couples to marry and Governor Lincoln Chafee signed it into law.

When it filed Gill v. Office of Personnel Management in March 2009, GLAD Law became the first organization to file a federal court challenge to Section 3 of the Defense of Marriage Act (DOMA) that prevented the federal government from recognizing the validity of same-sex marriages. On November 9, 2010, GLAD Law filed a second challenge to Section 3 with Pedersen v. Office of Personnel Management. It won both cases in U.S. District Court and in the First and Second Circuit Courts of Appeals, respectively. In July and August 2012, the U.S. Department of Justice filed certiorari petitions in the U.S. Supreme Court in both those cases. The Supreme Court chose instead to review Windsor v. United States.

== Key personnel ==
- Mary Bonauto (1990–)
- Jennifer Levi (1998–)
- Ben Klein (1994–)
- Gary Buseck

== See also ==
- Gay & Lesbian Alliance Against Defamation (GLAAD)
- Parents, Families and Friends of Lesbians and Gays (PFLAG)
- LGBT rights in the United States
