= Defense of Marriage Act =

1996 U.S. federal law, repealed in 2022

- Long title: An Act to define and protect the institution of marriage
- Acronyms (colloquial): DOMA
- Enacted by: the 104th United States Congress
- Effective: September 21, 1996; 30 years ago

Citations
- Public law: Pub. L. 104–199 (text) (PDF)
- Statutes at Large: 110 Stat. 2419 (1996)

Codification
- Titles amended: 1 U.S.C. General Provisions; 28 U.S.C. Judiciary and Judicial Procedure
- U.S.C. sections created: 1 U.S.C. § 7 (Struck down, June 26, 2013)

Legislative history
- Introduced in the House as H.R. 3396 by Bob Barr (R–GA) on May 7, 1996; Committee consideration by House Judiciary; Passed the House on July 12, 1996 (342–67); Passed the Senate on September 10, 1996 (85–14); Signed into law by President Bill Clinton on September 21, 1996

Major amendments
- Repealed by Respect for Marriage Act on December 13, 2022

United States Supreme Court cases
- United States v. Windsor, No. 12-307, 570 U.S. 744 (2013), in which Section 3 (1 U.S.C. § 7) was struck down by the Supreme Court on June 26, 2013. Obergefell v. Hodges, No. 14-566, 576 U.S. 644 (2015), in which Section 2 (1 U.S.C. § 7) was rendered superseded and unenforceable by the Supreme Court.

The Defense of Marriage Act (DOMA) was a United States federal law passed by the 104th United States Congress and signed into law by President Bill Clinton on September 21, 1996. It banned federal recognition of same-sex marriage by limiting the definition of marriage to the union of one man and one woman, and it further allowed states to refuse to recognize same-sex marriages granted under the laws of other states.

Congressman Bob Barr and Senator Don Nickles, both members of the Republican Party, introduced the bill that became DOMA in May 1996. It passed both houses of Congress by large, veto-proof majorities. Support was bipartisan, though about a third of the Democratic caucus in both the House and Senate opposed it. Clinton criticized DOMA as "divisive and unnecessary". He nonetheless signed it into law in September 1996.

Section 2 of the act allowed states to deny recognition of same-sex marriages conducted by other states. Section 3 codified non-recognition of same-sex marriages for all federal purposes, including insurance benefits for government employees, social security survivors' benefits, immigration, bankruptcy, and the filing of joint tax returns. It also excluded same-sex spouses from the scope of laws protecting families of federal officers, laws evaluating financial aid eligibility, and federal ethics laws applicable to opposite-sex spouses.

After its passage, DOMA was subject to numerous lawsuits and repeal efforts. In United States v. Windsor (2013), the U.S. Supreme Court declared Section 3 of DOMA unconstitutional under the Due Process Clause, thereby requiring the federal government to recognize same-sex marriages conducted by the states. In Obergefell v. Hodges (2015), the Court held that same-sex marriage was a fundamental right protected by both the Due Process Clause and the Equal Protection Clause. The ruling required all states to perform and recognize the marriages of same-sex couples, leaving Section 2 of DOMA as superseded and unenforceable, at which point the only remaining part of the legislation which remained valid was Section 1 relating to its title. On December 13, 2022, DOMA was repealed by the passage of the Respect for Marriage Act which was signed into law by President Joe Biden, who had previously voted in favor of DOMA as a United States Senator.

== Background ==
The issue of legal recognition of same-sex marriage attracted mainstream attention infrequently until the 1980s. A sympathetic reporter heard several gay men raise the issue in 1967 and described it as "high among the deviate's hopes". In one early incident, gay activist Jack Baker brought suit against the state of Minnesota in 1970 after being denied a marriage license to marry another man; the Minnesota Supreme Court ruled (in Baker v. Nelson) that limiting marriage to opposite-sex couples did not violate the Constitution. Baker later changed his legal name to Pat Lynn McConnell and married his male partner in 1971, but the marriage was not legally recognized. A 1972 off-Broadway play, Nightride, depicted "a black–white homosexual marriage". (Note: For a review of the play see Barnes, Clive (December 10, 1971). "'Nightride'–No Apologies and No Regrets" (PDF). The New York Times. Archived (PDF) from the original on October 12, 2019.) In 1979, IntegrityUSA, an organization of gay Episcopalians, raised the issue when the U.S. Episcopal Church considered a ban on the ordination of homosexuals as priests. (Note: For the theological background beginning in 1967, see Fiske, Edward B. (December 3, 1967). "Views on Homosexuals" (PDF). The New York Times. Archived (PDF) from the original on October 12, 2019.)

The New York Times said the question was "all but dormant" until the late 1980s when, according to gay activists, "the AIDS epidemic... brought questions of inheritance and death benefits to many people's minds." In May 1989, Denmark established registered partnerships that granted same-sex couples many of the rights associated with marriage. In the same year, New York's highest court ruled that two homosexual men qualified as a family for the purposes of New York City's rent-control regulations. Within the movement for gay and lesbian rights, a debate between advocates of sexual liberation and of social integration was taking shape, with Andrew Sullivan publishing an essay "Here Comes the Groom" in The New Republic in August 1989 arguing for same-sex marriage: "A need to rebel has quietly ceded to a desire to belong." In September 1989, the State Bar Association of California urged recognition of marriages between homosexuals even before gay rights advocates adopted the issue.

Gary Bauer, head of the socially conservative Family Research Council, predicted in 1989 that the issue would be "a major battleground in the 1990s". In 1991, Georgia Attorney General Michael J. Bowers (who had previously been the defendant in a failed Supreme Court challenge to a law that criminalized homosexuality) withdrew a job offer to a lesbian who planned to marry another woman in a Jewish wedding ceremony. In 1993, a committee of the Evangelical Lutheran Church in America released a report asking Lutherans to consider blessing same-sex marriages and stating that lifelong abstinence was harmful to same-sex couples. The Conference of Bishops responded, "There is basis neither in Scripture nor tradition for the establishment of an official ceremony by this church for the blessing of a homosexual relationship." In a critique of radicalism in the gay liberation movement, Bruce Bawer's A Place at the Table (1993) advocated the legalization of same-sex marriage.

=== Baehr v. Miike ===
In the 1993 lawsuit Baehr v. Miike the Supreme Court of Hawaii ruled that preventing same-sex couples from obtaining marriage licenses was sex discrimination. Thus, the court found that the Hawaii State Constitution required the state to demonstrate that its opposite-sex marriage definition satisfied the legal standard known as strict scrutiny. This ruling prompted concern among opponents of same-sex marriage, who feared that same-sex marriage might become legal in Hawaii and that other states would recognize or be compelled to recognize those marriages under the Full Faith and Credit Clause of the United States Constitution. This was because "marriage" and "spouse" were largely undefined terms in federal law, with federal courts relying on state law to define what "marriage" practically entailed. To quote the House Judiciary Committee's 1996 report on bill H.R. 3396 (which would become DOMA): "Until the Hawaii situation, there was never any reason to make explicit what has always been implicit — namely, that only heterosexual couples could get married".

In 1995, as Baehr v. Miike progressed through Hawaiian courts, dozens of states proposed and enacted laws which explicitly denied recognition of same-sex marriages performed elsewhere in the US and defined marriage as being between a man and a woman. States would continue enacting these laws even after DOMA passed.

The House Judiciary Committee's 1996 report called for DOMA as a response to Baehr, because "a redefinition of marriage in Hawaii to include homosexual couples could make such couples eligible for a whole range of federal rights and benefits". Additionally, the report claims that four distinct governmental interests would be advanced by DOMA: "(1) defending and nurturing the institution of traditional, heterosexual marriage; (2) defending traditional notions of morality; (3) protecting state sovereignty and democratic self-governance; and (4) preserving scarce government resources".

== Text ==
The main provisions of the act were as follows:

Section 1. Short title
This Act may be cited as the "Defense of Marriage Act".
Section 2. Powers reserved to the states
No State, territory, or possession of the United States, or Indian tribe, shall be required to give effect to any public act, record, or judicial proceeding of any other State, territory, possession, or tribe respecting a relationship between persons of the same sex that is treated as a marriage under the laws of such other State, territory, possession, or tribe, or a right or claim arising from such relationship.
Section 3. Definition of marriage
In determining the meaning of any Act of Congress, or of any ruling, regulation, or interpretation of the various administrative bureaus and agencies of the United States, the word 'marriage' means only a legal union between one man and one woman as husband and wife, and the word 'spouse' refers only to a person of the opposite sex who is a husband or a wife.

== Enactment and role of President Clinton ==
Georgia Representative Bob Barr, then a Republican, authored the Defense of Marriage Act and introduced it in the House of Representatives on May 7, 1996. Senator Don Nickles, (R-OK), introduced the bill in the Senate. The House Judiciary Committee stated that the Act was intended by Congress to "reflect and honor a collective moral judgment and to express moral disapproval of homosexuality". The Act's congressional sponsors stated, "[T]he bill amends the U.S. Code to make explicit what has been understood under federal law for over 200 years; that a marriage is the legal union of a man and a woman as husband and wife, and a spouse is a husband or wife of the opposite sex."

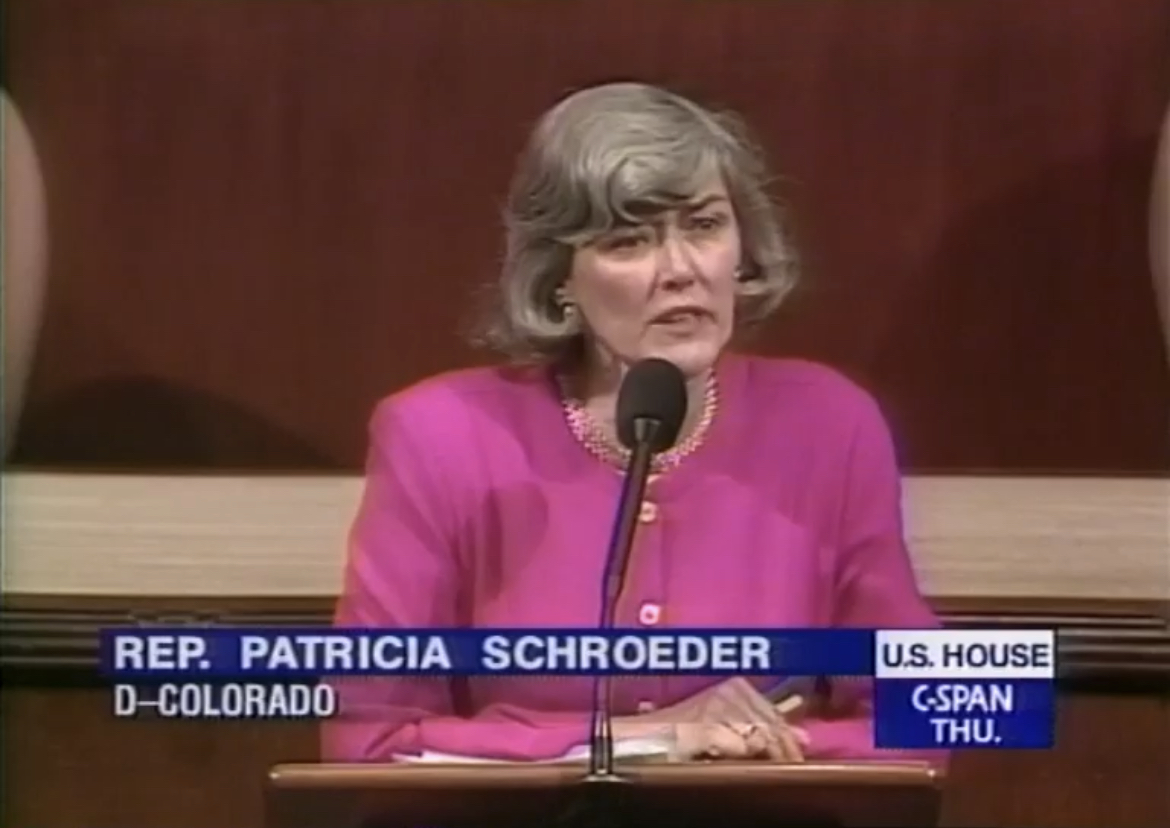
Pat Schroeder arguing against DOMA in the House of Representatives

Nickles said, "If some state wishes to recognize same-sex marriage, they can do so". He said the bill would ensure that "the 49 other states don't have to and the Federal Government does not have to." In opposition to the bill, Colorado Rep. Patricia Schroeder said, "You can't amend the Constitution with a statute. Everybody knows that. This is just stirring the political waters and seeing what hate you can unleash." Barr countered that the Full Faith and Credit Clause of the Constitution grants Congress power to determine "the effect" of the obligation of each state to grant "full faith and credit" to other states' acts.

The 1996 Republican Party platform endorsed DOMA, referencing only Section 2 of the act: "We reject the distortion of [anti-discrimination] laws to cover sexual preference, and we endorse the Defense of Marriage Act to prevent states from being forced to recognize same-sex unions." The Democratic Party platform that year did not mention DOMA or same-sex marriage. In a June 1996 interview in the gay and lesbian magazine The Advocate, Clinton said, "I remain opposed to same-sex marriage. I believe marriage is an institution for the union of a man and a woman. This has been my long-standing position, and it is not being reviewed or reconsidered." However, he also criticized DOMA as unnecessary and divisive.

The bill moved through Congress on a legislative fast track and met with overwhelming approval in both houses of the Republican-controlled Congress. On July 12, 1996, with only 65 Democrats and then Rep. Bernie Sanders (I-VT) and Rep. Steve Gunderson (R-WI), in opposition, 342 members of the U.S. House of Representatives—224 Republicans and 118 Democrats—voted to pass DOMA. On September 10, 1996, 84 Senators, a majority of the Democratic Senators, including Joe Biden, and all of the Republicans—voted in favor of DOMA. Democratic Senators voted for the bill 32 to 14 (with Pryor of Arkansas absent), and Democratic Representatives voted for it 118 to 65, with 15 not participating. All Republicans in both houses voted for the bill with the sole exception of the one openly gay Republican Congressman, Rep. Steve Gunderson of Wisconsin.

After Congress had passed DOMA with veto-proof majorities in both houses, Clinton signed the bill into law on September 21, 1996 late at night behind closed doors. Clinton, who was traveling when Congress acted, signed it into law promptly upon returning to Washington, D.C.; no signing ceremony was held for DOMA and no photographs were taken of Clinton signing it. The White House released a statement in which Clinton said "that the enactment of this legislation should not, despite the fierce and at times divisive rhetoric surrounding it, be understood to provide an excuse for discrimination, violence or intimidation against any person on the basis of sexual orientation".

In 2013, Mike McCurry, the White House press secretary at the time, recalled that Clinton's "posture was quite frankly driven by the political realities of an election year in 1996." James Hormel, who was appointed by Clinton as the first openly gay U.S. Ambassador, described the reaction from the gay community to Clinton signing DOMA as shock and anger.

Following the signing of DOMA, Clinton's public position on same-sex marriage shifted. In 2008, he spoke out against the passage of California's Proposition 8, which would have banned same-sex marriage, and recorded robocalls urging Californians to vote against it. In July 2009, he came out in support of same-sex marriage.

Years later, Clinton claimed that he signed DOMA reluctantly in view of the veto-proof congressional majorities in support of the bill, and that he did so to avoid associating himself politically with the then-unpopular cause of same-sex marriage and to defuse momentum for a proposed amendment to the U.S. Constitution banning same-sex marriage. Even so, later the same year, Clinton ran ads on Christian radio stations nationwide promoting his signing of the legislation. The ads were pulled after massive blowback from LGBT groups. Clinton's explanation for signing DOMA has been disputed by gay rights activists Elizabeth Birch and Evan Wolfson.

== Legal impact ==
The General Accounting Office issued a report in 1997 identifying "1,049 federal statutory provisions classified to the United States Code in which benefits, rights, and privileges are contingent on marital status or in which marital status is a factor". In updating its report in 2004, the GAO found that this number had risen to 1,138 as of December 31, 2003. With respect to Social Security, housing, and food stamps, the GAO found that "recognition of the marital relationship is integral to the design of the program[s]." The report also noted several other major program categories that were affected—veterans' benefits, including pensions and survivor benefits; taxes on income, estates, gifts, and property sales; and benefits due federal employees, both civilian and military—and identified specifics such as the rights of the surviving spouse of a creator of copyrighted work and the financial disclosure requirements of spouses of Congress members and certain officers of the federal government. Education loan programs and agriculture price support and loan programs also implicate spouses. Financial aid to "family farms" for example, is restricted to those in which "a majority interest is held by individuals related by marriage or blood."

Because the federal Employee Retirement Income Security Act (ERISA) controls most employee benefits provided by private employers, DOMA removed some tax breaks for employers and employees in the private sector when it comes to health care, pension, and disability benefits to same-sex spouses on an equal footing with opposite-sex spouses. ERISA does not affect employees of state and local government or churches, nor does it extend to such benefits as employee leave and vacation.

Under DOMA, persons in same-sex marriages were not considered married for immigration purposes. U.S. citizens and permanent residents in same-sex marriages could not petition for their spouses, nor could they be accompanied by their spouses into the U.S. on the basis of a family or employment-based visa. A non-citizen in such a marriage could not use it as the basis for obtaining a waiver or relief from removal from the U.S.

Following the end of the U.S. military's ban on service by open gays and lesbians, "Don't ask, don't tell," in September 2011, Admiral Mike Mullen, Chairman of the Joint Chiefs of Staff, noted that DOMA limited the military's ability to extend the same benefits to military personnel in same-sex marriages as their peers in opposite-sex marriages received, notably health benefits. Same-sex spouses of military personnel were denied the same access to military bases, legal counseling, and housing allowances provided to different-sex spouses.

== Political impact ==
The 2000 Republican Party platform endorsed DOMA in general terms and indicated concern about judicial activism: "We support the traditional definition of 'marriage' as the legal union of one man and one woman, and we believe that federal judges and bureaucrats should not force states to recognize other living arrangements as marriages." The Democratic Party platform that year did not mention DOMA or marriage in this context.

=== Bush administration ===
In 2004, President George W. Bush endorsed a proposed constitutional amendment to restrict marriage to opposite-sex couples because he found DOMA to be vulnerable: "After more than two centuries of American jurisprudence and millennia of human experience, a few judges and local authorities are presuming to change the most fundamental institution of civilization. Their actions have created confusion on an issue that requires clarity." In January 2005, however, he said he would not lobby on its behalf, since too many U.S. senators thought DOMA would not survive a constitutional challenge.

=== Obama administration ===
President Barack Obama's 2008 political platform endorsed the repeal of DOMA. On June 12, 2009, the Justice Department issued a brief defending the constitutionality of DOMA in the case of Smelt v. United States, continuing its longstanding practice of defending all federal laws challenged in court. On June 15, 2009, Human Rights Campaign President Joe Solmonese wrote an open letter to Obama that asked for actions to balance the DOJ's courtroom position: "We call on you to put your principles into action and send legislation repealing DOMA to Congress." A representative of Lambda Legal, an LGBT impact litigation and advocacy organization, noted that the Obama administration's legal arguments omitted the Bush administration's assertion that households headed by opposite-sex spouses were better at raising children than those headed by same-sex spouses.

On February 23, 2011, Attorney General Eric Holder released a statement regarding lawsuits challenging DOMA Section 3. He wrote:

After careful consideration, including a review of my recommendation, the President has concluded that given a number of factors, including a documented history of discrimination, classifications based on sexual orientation should be subject to a more heightened standard of scrutiny. The President has also concluded that Section 3 of DOMA, as applied to legally married same-sex couples, fails to meet that standard and is therefore unconstitutional. Given that conclusion, the President has instructed the Department not to defend the statute in such cases.

He also announced that although it was no longer defending Section 3 in court, the administration intended to continue to enforce the law "unless and until Congress repeals Section 3 or the judicial branch renders a definitive verdict against the law's constitutionality."

In a separate letter to Speaker of the House John Boehner, Holder noted that Congress could participate in these lawsuits.

On February 24, the Department of Justice notified the First Circuit Court of Appeals that it would "cease to defend" Gill and Massachusetts as well. On July 1, 2011, the DOJ, with a filing in Golinski, intervened for the first time on behalf of a plaintiff seeking to have DOMA Section 3 ruled unconstitutional, arguing that laws that use sexual orientation as a classification need to pass the court's intermediate scrutiny standard of review. The DOJ made similar arguments in a filing in Gill on July 7.

In June 2012, filing an amicus brief in Golinski, two former Republican Attorneys General, Edwin Meese and John Ashcroft, called the DOJ's decision not to defend DOMA Section 3 "an unprecedented and ill-advised departure from over two centuries of Executive Branch practice" and "an extreme and unprecedented deviation from the historical norm".

=== Congressional intervention ===
On March 4, 2011, Boehner announced that the Bipartisan Legal Advisory Group (BLAG) would convene to consider whether the House of Representatives should defend DOMA Section 3 in place of the Department of Justice, and on March 9 the committee voted 3–2 to do so.

On April 18, 2011, House leaders announced the selection of former United States Solicitor General Paul Clement to represent BLAG. Clement, without opposition from other parties to the case, filed a motion to be allowed to intervene in the suit "for the limited purpose of defending the constitutionality of Section III" of DOMA. On April 25, 2011, King & Spalding, the law firm through which Clement was handling the case, announced it was dropping the case. On the same day, Clement resigned from King & Spalding in protest and joined Bancroft PLLC, which took on the case. The House's initial contract with Clement capped legal fees at $500,000, but on September 30 a revised contract raised the cap to $1.5 million. A spokesman for Boehner explained that BLAG would not appeal in all cases, citing bankruptcy cases that are "unlikely to provide the path to the Supreme Court....[E]ffectively defending [DOMA] does not require the House to intervene in every case, especially when doing so would be prohibitively expensive."

== Challenges to Section 3 in Federal court ==
Numerous plaintiffs have challenged DOMA. Prior to 2009, all federal courts upheld DOMA in its entirety.

Later cases focused on Section 3's definition of marriage. The courts, using different standards, have all found Section 3 unconstitutional. Requests for the Supreme Court to hear appeals were filed in five cases, listed below (with Supreme Court docket numbers):

- Gill v. Office of Personnel Management (12-13 as BLAG v. Gill)
- Massachusetts v. United States Department of Health and Human Services (12-15 as Dept. of HHS v. Massachusetts, 12-97)
- Golinski v. Office of Personnel Management (12-16 OPM v. Golinski)
- Windsor v. United States (12-63)
- Pedersen v. Office of Personnel Management (12-231)

=== Golinski v. Office of Personnel Management ===
Golinski v. Office of Personnel Management was a challenge to Section 3 of DOMA in federal court based on a judicial employee's attempt to receive spousal health benefits for her partner. In 2008, Karen Golinski, a 19-year employee of the Ninth Circuit Court of Appeals, applied for health benefits for her wife. When the application was denied, she filed a complaint under the Ninth Circuit's Employment Dispute Resolution Plan. Chief Judge Alex Kozinski, in his administrative capacity, ruled in 2009 that she was entitled to spousal health benefits, but the Office of Personnel Management (OPM) announced that it would not comply with the ruling.

On March 17, 2011, U.S. District Judge Jeffrey White dismissed the suit on procedural grounds but invited Golinski to amend her suit to argue the unconstitutionality of DOMA Section 3, which she did on April 14. Following the Attorney General's decision to no longer defend DOMA, the Bipartisan Legal Advisory Group (BLAG), an arm of the House of Representatives, took up the defense. Former United States Solicitor General Paul Clement filed, on BLAG's behalf, a motion to dismiss raising arguments previously avoided by the Department of Justice: that DOMA's definition of marriage is valid "because only a man and a woman can beget a child together, and because historical experience has shown that a family consisting of a married father and mother is an effective social structure for raising children." On July 1, 2011, the DOJ filed a brief in support of Golinski's suit, in which it detailed for the first time its case for heightened scrutiny based on "a significant history of purposeful discrimination against gay and lesbian people, by governmental as well as private entities" and its arguments that DOMA Section 3 fails to meet that standard.

On February 22, 2012, White ruled for Golinski, finding DOMA "violates her right to equal protection of the law under the Fifth Amendment to the United States Constitution." He wrote that Section 3 of DOMA could not pass the "heightened scrutiny" or the "rational basis" test. He wrote,

The Court finds that neither Congress' claimed legislative justifications nor any of the proposed reasons proffered by BLAG constitute bases rationally related to any of the alleged governmental interests. Further, after concluding that neither the law nor the record can sustain any of the interests suggested, the Court, having tried on its own, cannot conceive of any additional interests that DOMA might further.

While the case was on appeal to the Ninth Circuit, on July 3, 2012, the DOJ asked the Supreme Court to review the case before the Ninth Circuit decides it so it can be heard together with two other cases in which DOMA Section 3 was held unconstitutional, Gill v. Office of Personnel Management and Massachusetts v. United States Department of Health and Human Services. The Supreme Court chose to hear Windsor instead of these cases, and following the Supreme Court decision in Windsor the Ninth Circuit dismissed the appeal in Golinski with the consent of all parties on July 23.

=== Gill and Massachusetts ===
On March 3, 2009, GLAD filed a federal court challenge, Gill v. Office of Personnel Management, based on the Equal Protection Clause and the federal government's consistent deference to each state's definition of marriage prior to the enactment of DOMA. The case questioned only the DOMA provision that the federal government defines marriage as the union of a man and a woman. On May 6, 2010, Judge Joseph L. Tauro heard arguments in the U.S. District Court in Boston.

On July 8, 2009, Massachusetts Attorney General Martha Coakley filed a suit, Massachusetts v. United States Department of Health and Human Services, challenging the constitutionality of DOMA. The suit claims that Congress "overstepped its authority, undermined states' efforts to recognize marriages between same-sex couples, and codified an animus towards gay and lesbian people." Tauro, the judge also handling Gill, heard arguments on May 26, 2010.

On July 8, 2010, Tauro issued his rulings in both Gill and Massachusetts, granting summary judgment for the plaintiffs in both cases. He found in Gill that Section 3 of the Defense of Marriage Act violates the equal protection of the laws guaranteed by the Due Process Clause of the Fifth Amendment to the U.S. Constitution. In Massachusetts he held that the same section of DOMA violates the Tenth Amendment and falls outside Congress' authority under the Spending Clause of the Constitution. Those decisions were stayed after the DOJ filed an appeal on October 12, 2010.

On November 3, 2011, 133 House Democrats filed an amicus brief in support of the plaintiffs in Gill and Massachusetts, asserting their belief that Section 3 of DOMA was unconstitutional. Included among the members of Congress signing the brief were 14 members who had voted for the bill in 1996. Seventy major employers also filed an amicus brief supporting the plaintiffs. A three-judge panel heard arguments in the case on April 4, 2012, during which the DOJ for the first time took the position that it could not defend Section 3 of DOMA under any level of scrutiny. On May 31, 2012, the panel unanimously affirmed Tauro's ruling, finding Section 3 of DOMA unconstitutional. On June 29, BLAG filed a petition for certiorari with the Supreme Court. The DOJ did so on July 3, while asking the Supreme Court to review Golinski as well. The Commonwealth of Massachusetts filed a response to both petitions adding the Spending Clause and Tenth Amendment issues as questions presented. (Note: The Commonwealth also filed its own petition in Massachusetts in case the court found the response was not the proper way to raise those issues.) The Supreme Court denied these petitions on June 27, 2013, following its decision in Windsor.

=== United States v. Windsor ===
On November 9, 2010, the American Civil Liberties Union filed United States v. Windsor in New York on behalf of a surviving same-sex spouse whose inheritance from her deceased spouse had been subject to federal taxation as if they were unmarried. New York is part of the Second Circuit, where no precedent exists for the standard of review to be followed in sexual-orientation discrimination cases.

New York Attorney General Eric Schneiderman filed a brief supporting Windsor's claim on July 26, 2011.

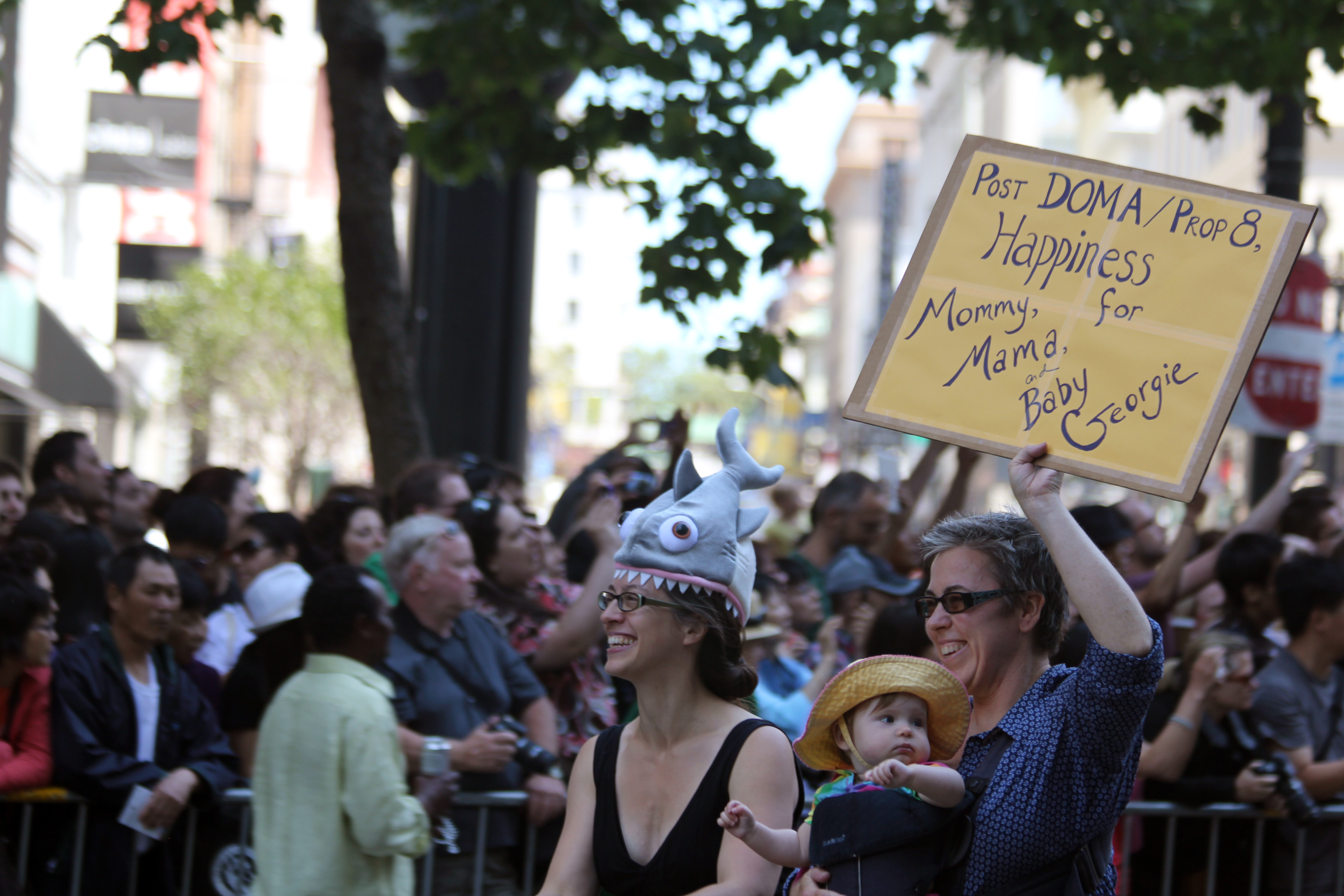
Same-sex couple celebrating legal victory at San Francisco Pride 2013

On June 6, 2012, Judge Barbara Jones ruled that based on rational basis review Section 3 of DOMA is unconstitutional and ordered the requested tax refund be paid to Windsor. The plaintiff commented, "It's thrilling to have a court finally recognize how unfair it is for the government to have treated us as though we were strangers." Windsor's attorneys filed a petition of certiorari with the Supreme Court on July 16, asking for the case to be considered without waiting for the Second Circuit's review. On October 18, the Second Circuit Court of Appeals upheld the lower court's ruling that Section 3 of DOMA is unconstitutional. According to an ACLU press release, this ruling was "the first federal appeals court decision to decide that government discrimination against gay people gets a more exacting level of judicial review". In an opinion authored by Chief Judge Dennis Jacobs, the Second Circuit Court of Appeals stated:

Our straightforward legal analysis sidesteps the fair point that same-sex marriage is unknown to history and tradition, but law (federal or state) is not concerned with holy matrimony. Government deals with marriage as a civil status—however fundamental—and New York has elected to extend that status to same-sex couples.

On December 7, 2012, the Supreme Court agreed to hear the case. Oral arguments were heard on March 27, 2013. In a 5–4 decision on June 26, 2013, the Court ruled Section 3 of DOMA to be unconstitutional, declaring it "a deprivation of the liberty of the person protected by the Fifth Amendment."

On July 18, 2013, the Bipartisan Legal Advisory Group (BLAG), which had mounted a defense of Section 3 when the administration declined to, acknowledged that in Windsor "[t]he Supreme Court recently resolved the issue of DOMA Section 3's constitutionality" and said "it no longer will defend that statute."

=== Pedersen v. Office of Personnel Management ===
Pedersen v. Office of Personnel Management is a case filed by GLAD in Connecticut on behalf of same-sex couples in Connecticut, Vermont, and New Hampshire, in which GLAD repeats the arguments it made in Gill.

On July 31, 2012, Judge Vanessa Lynne Bryant ruled that "having considered the purported rational bases proffered by both BLAG and Congress and concluded that such objectives bear no rational relationship to Section 3 of DOMA as a legislative scheme, the Court finds that no conceivable rational basis exists for the provision. The provision therefore violates the equal protection principles incorporated in the Fifth Amendment to the United States Constitution." She held that "laws that classify people based on sexual orientation should be subject to heightened scrutiny by courts" but determined Section 3 of DOMA "fails to pass constitutional muster under even the most deferential level of judicial scrutiny." The case was appealed to the Second Circuit, and on August 21, 2012, Pedersen asked the Supreme Court to review the case before the Second Circuit decides it so it can be heard together with Gill v. Office of Personnel Management and Massachusetts v. United States Department of Health and Human Services. The Supreme Court denied these petitions on June 27, 2013, following its decision in Windsor.

=== Other cases ===
Other cases that challenged DOMA include:

- Dragovich v. Department of the Treasury, No. 10-1564 (N.D. Cal.), a class action in which California same-sex couples seek equal access to California's long-term care insurance program for public employees and their families. U.S. District Court Judge Claudia Wilken on May 24, 2012, found Section 3 of DOMA and certain IRS regulations violated the plaintiffs' equal protection rights.
- Hara v. Office of Personnel Management, No. 09-3134 (Fed. Cir.) Hara is one of the plaintiffs in Gill.
- Torres-Barragan v. Holder, No. 10-55768 (9th Cir.) An immigration-related DOMA challenge in which the district court rejected the constitutional challenges.
- Cozen O'Connor v. Tobits, No. 11-00045-CDJ, Pennsylvania, in which two parties dispute who inherits the proceeds of a law firm's profit-sharing plan under ERISA and DOMA. The DOJ filed a brief arguing the unconstitutionality of DOMA. Following the decision in Windsor, Judge C. Darnell Jones II ruled that the widow qualified as the deceased's spouse since Illinois, their state of domicile, recognized them as spouses in a civil union as defined by Illinois. The deceased's parents dropped their appeal on August 30.
- On April 5, 2012, Chief Judge James Ware of the U.S. District Court for the Northern District of California ordered the federal court clerk to reimburse Christopher Nathan, a court employee, for the costs of health insurance coverage for his same-sex spouse comparable to that denied him by Section 3 of DOMA. On November 21, 2012, the Ninth Circuit Judicial Conference affirmed Ware's decision and ordered the court to determine the amount due Nathan and pay him within 10 days.

==== Military and veterans cases ====
On October 13, 2011, Carmen Cardona, a U.S. Navy veteran, filed a lawsuit in the United States Court of Appeals for Veterans Claims seeking disability benefits for her wife that the Veterans Administration and the Board of Veterans Appeals had denied. Cardona was represented by the Yale Law School Legal Services Clinic. At the request of BLAG, which defended the government's action, and over Cardona's objections, the court postponed oral argument in Cardona v. Shinseki pending the Supreme Court's disposition of writs of certiorari in other DOMA cases.

On October 27, 2011, the Servicemembers Legal Defense Network (SLDN) brought suit in federal court on behalf of several military servicemembers and veterans in same-sex marriages. In a November 21 filing in the case of McLaughlin v. Panetta, they wrote, "Any claim that DOMA, as applied to military spousal benefits, survives rational basis review is strained because paying unequal benefits to service members runs directly counter to the military values of uniformity, fairness and unit cohesion." The benefits at issue include medical and dental benefits, basic housing and transportation allowances, family separation benefits, visitation rights in military hospitals, and survivor benefit plans. The case was assigned to Judge Richard G. Stearns. One of the plaintiffs in the case, lesbian Charlie Morgan, who was undergoing chemotherapy, met with an assistant to Boehner on February 9, 2012, to ask him to consider not defending DOMA. The case is on hold at the request of both sides in anticipation of the outcome of two other First Circuit cases on appeal, Gill v. Office of Personnel Management and Massachusetts v. United States Department of Health and Human Services. On February 17, the DOJ announced it could not defend the constitutionality of the statutes challenged in the case. In May 2012, the parties filed briefs arguing whether BLAG has a right to intervene. On June 27, Stearns asked the parties to explain by July 18 why given the decision in Windsor he should not find for the plaintiffs. On July 18, BLAG's response acknowledged that "[t]he Supreme Court recently resolved the issue of DOMA Section 3's constitutionality" and asked to be allowed to withdraw from the case. It took no position on the two statutes at issue in the case, which define a "spouse" as "a person of the opposite sex", except to say that "the question of whether [that definition] is constitutional remains open".

Tracey Cooper-Harris, an Army veteran from California, sued the Veterans Administration and the DOJ in federal court on February 1, 2012, asking for her wife to receive the benefits normally granted to spouses of disabled veterans. BLAG sought a delay in Cooper-Harris v. United States pending the resolution of Golinski, which the attorneys for Cooper-Harris, the Southern Poverty Law Center, opposed. The court denied BLAG's motion on August 4. In February 2013, Judge Consuelo Marshall rejected the DOJ's argument that the case could only be heard by the Board of Veterans' Appeals and allowed the case to proceed. BLAG asked to withdraw from the lawsuit on July 22.

==== Bankruptcy court ====
In May 2011, DOMA-based challenges by the Department of Justice to joint petitions for bankruptcy by married same-sex couples were denied in two cases, one in the Southern District of New York on May 4 and one in the Eastern District of California on May 31. Both rulings stressed practical considerations and avoided ruling on DOMA.

On June 13, 2011, 20 of the 25 judges of the U.S. Bankruptcy Court for the Central District of California signed an opinion in the case in re Balas and Morales that found that a same-sex married couple filing for bankruptcy "have made their case persuasively that DOMA deprives them of the equal protection of the law to which they are entitled." The decision found DOMA Section 3 unconstitutional and dismissed BLAG's objections to the joint filing:

Although individual members of Congress have every right to express their views and the views of their constituents with respect to their religious beliefs and principles and their personal standards of who may marry whom, this court cannot conclude that Congress is entitled to solemnize such views in the laws of this nation in disregard of the views, legal status and living arrangements of a significant segment of our citizenry that includes the Debtors in this case. To do so violates the Debtors' right to equal protection of those laws embodied in the due process clause of the Fifth Amendment. This court cannot conclude from the evidence or the record in this case that any valid governmental interest is advanced by DOMA as applied to the Debtors.

A spokesman for House Speaker Boehner said BLAG would not appeal the ruling, On July 7, 2011, the DOJ announced that after consultation with BLAG it would no longer raise objections to "bankruptcy petitions filed jointly by same-sex couples who are married under state law".

==== Immigration cases ====
Bi-national same-sex couples were kept from legally living in the United States by DOMA's Section 3, which prevented one spouse from sponsoring the other for a green card. Following some uncertainty after the Obama Administration determined Section 3 to be unconstitutional, the United States Citizenship and Immigration Services (USCIS) reaffirmed its policy of denying such applications. With respect to obtaining a visitor's visa, Bureau rules treated bi-national same-sex spouses the same as bi-national opposite-sex unmarried partners under the classification "cohabiting partners".

Tim Coco and Genesio J. Oliveira, a same-sex couple married in Massachusetts in 2005, successfully challenged this policy and developed a model since followed by other immigration activists. The U.S. refused to recognize their marriage, and in 2007 Oliveira, a Brazilian national, accepted "voluntary departure" and returned to Brazil. They conducted a national press campaign A Boston Globe editorial commented, "Great strides toward equality for gays have been made in this country, but the woeful fate of Tim Coco and Genesio Oliveira shows that thousands of same-sex couples, even in Massachusetts, still aren't really full citizens." The editorial gained the attention of Senator John F. Kerry, who first lobbied Attorney General Eric Holder without success. He then gained the support of Homeland Security Secretary Janet Napolitano, who granted Oliveira humanitarian parole, enabling the couple to reunite in the U.S. in June 2010. Humanitarian parole is granted on a case-by-case basis at the Secretary's discretion.

On September 28, 2011, in Lui v. Holder, U.S. District Court Judge Stephen V. Wilson rejected a challenge to DOMA, citing Adams v. Howerton (1982). The plaintiffs in that case had unsuccessfully challenged the denial of immediate relative status to the same-sex spouse of an American citizen. Early in 2012, two bi-national same-sex couples were granted "deferred action" status, suspending deportation proceedings against the non-U.S. citizen for a year. A similar Texas couple had a deportation case dismissed in March 2012, leaving the non-citizen spouse unable to work legally in the United States but no longer subject to the threat of deportation.

On January 5, 2012, the U.S. District Court for the Northern District of Illinois in Chicago decided the suit of a same-sex binational couple. Demos Revelis and Marcel Maas, married in Iowa in 2010, sought to prevent the USCIS from applying Section 3 of DOMA to Revelis's application for a permanent residence visa for Maas and, in the court's words, "that their petition be reviewed and decided on the same basis as other married couples." Judge Harry D. Leinenweber, a Reagan appointee, denied the government's motion to dismiss. BLAG has argued for the suit to be dismissed. In July the court stayed proceedings until mid-October because the USCIS was considering denying the plaintiffs' request on grounds unrelated to DOMA.

On April 2, 2012, five bi-national same-sex couples represented by Immigration Equality and Paul, Weiss filed a lawsuit, Blesch v. Holder, in the District Court for the Eastern District of New York, claiming that Section 3 of DOMA violated their equal protection rights by denying the U.S. citizen in the relationship the same rights in the green card application process granted a U.S. citizen who is in a relationship of partners of the opposite sex. On July 25, Chief Judge Carol Amon stayed the case pending the resolution of Windsor by the Second Circuit.

Immigration rights advocate Lavi Soloway reported on June 19, 2012, that the Board of Immigration Appeals (BIA) had in four cases responded to green card denials on the part of the U.S. Citizenship and Immigration Services (USCIS) by asking the USCIS to document the marital status of the same-sex couples and determine whether the foreign national would qualify for a green card in the absence of DOMA Section 3. He said the BIA is "essentially setting the stage for being able to approve the petitions in a post-DOMA universe."

On April 19, 2013, U.S. District Judge Consuelo Marshall ordered that a suit brought in July 2012 by Jane DeLeon, a Philippine citizen, and her spouse, Irma Rodriguez, a U.S. citizen, could proceed as a class action. The plaintiffs, represented by the Center for Human Rights and Constitutional Law, contended that DeLeon was denied a residency waiver because of DOMA Section 3.

On June 28, 2013, the USCIS notified U.S. citizen Julian Marsh that it had approved the green card petition for his Bulgarian husband Traian Popov. Both are residents of Florida. On July 3, the USCIS office in Centennial, Colorado, granted Cathy Davis, a citizen of Ireland, a green card based on her marriage to U.S. citizen Catriona Dowling.

==== Tribunals ====
In 2009, United States Court of Appeals for the Ninth Circuit Judge Stephen Reinhardt declared DOMA unconstitutional in in re Levenson, an employment dispute resolution tribunal case, where the federal government refused to grant spousal benefits to Tony Sears, the husband of deputy federal public defender Brad Levenson. As an employee of the federal judiciary, Levenson is prohibited from suing his employer in federal court. Rather, employment disputes are handled at employment dispute resolution tribunals in which a federal judge hears the dispute in their capacity as a dispute resolution official.

== Challenges to Section 2 in federal court ==
Section 2 of DOMA states to give legal relief to any state from recognizing same-sex marriages performed in other jurisdictions. Section 2 posits a conflict between states' rights and civil rights. Various federal lawsuits, some filed alongside challenges to Section 3, have challenged Section 2.

- In re Kandu: A same-sex couple in the state of Washington, who had married in Canada, attempted to file a joint bankruptcy petition, but were not allowed to do so.
- Wilson v. Ake, an unsuccessful attempt by a Florida same-sex couple, married in Massachusetts, to have their marriage license accepted in Florida. (Note: The court held that in enacting Section 2 of DOMA "Congress’ actions are an appropriate exercise of its power to regulate conflicts between the laws of two different States" under the Full Faith and Credit Clause.)
- Smelt v. Orange County and Smelt v. United States: In February 2004, Arthur Smelt and Christopher Hammer sued Orange County, California, in federal court for refusing to issue them a marriage license. The district court ruled that the couple did not have standing to challenge Section 2 of DOMA and rejected their challenge to the constitutionality of Section 3. On May 5, 2006, the United States Court of Appeals for the Ninth Circuit dismissed the suit, and on October 10 the United States Supreme Court refused to consider the couple's appeal. On March 9, 2009, the same couple, having legally married in California, filed Smelt v. United States, challenging the constitutionality of DOMA and California's Proposition 8. District Judge David O. Carter dismissed the case on August 24, because the couple had not applied for and been denied any federal benefit and therefore lacked "an injury in fact."
- Bishop v. United States: Two lesbian couples in Oklahoma, one of which couples sought a marriage license and the other to have the state recognize either their Canadian marriage or their Vermont civil union. The court stayed consideration of the case pending the outcome of Windsor. Later it ruled the couple challenging Section 2 did not have standing, but ruled Oklahoma's same-sex marriage ban unconstitutional under Bishop v. Oklahoma.

=== Obergefell v. Hodges ===
On June 26, 2015, the U.S. Supreme Court ruled in Obergefell v. Hodges that the 14th Amendment requires all U.S. state laws to recognize same-sex marriages. This left Section 2 of DOMA as superseded and unenforceable.

== Repeal ==
On September 15, 2009, three Democratic members of Congress, Jerrold Nadler of New York, Tammy Baldwin of Wisconsin, and Jared Polis of Colorado, introduced legislation to repeal DOMA called the Respect for Marriage Act. The bill had 91 original co-sponsors in the House of Representatives and was supported by Clinton, Barr, and several legislators who voted for DOMA. Congressman Barney Frank and John Berry, head of the Office of Personnel Management, did not support that effort, stating that "the backbone is not there" in Congress. Frank and Berry suggested DOMA could be overturned more quickly through lawsuits such as Gill v. Office of Personnel Management filed by Gay & Lesbian Advocates & Defenders (GLAD).

Following Holder's announcement that the Obama Administration would no longer defend DOMA Section 3 in court, on March 16, 2011, Senator Dianne Feinstein introduced the Respect for Marriage Act in the Senate again and Nadler introduced it in the House. The Senate Judiciary Committee voted 10–8 in favor of advancing the bill to the Senate floor, but observers believed it would not gain the 60 votes needed to end debate and bring it to a vote.

After the Supreme Court struck down DOMA Section 3 on June 26, 2013, Feinstein and Nadler reintroduced the Respect for Marriage Act as S. 1236 and H.R. 2523. The Respect for Marriage Act cleared the 60 vote filibuster hurdle on November 16, 2022, when the Senate voted 62–37 to advance it. Joe Biden signed the repeal on December 13, 2022.

== See also ==
- LGBT rights in the United States
- Marriage Protection Act (2004)
- Same-sex unions in the United States
- Respect for Marriage Act (2022)

== General and cited references section ==
- Feigen, Brenda. "Same-Sex Marriage: An Issue of Constitutional rights not Moral Opinions". 2004. 27 Harv. Women's L. J. 345.
- Carter, W. Burlette. "The Federal Law of Marriage: Deference, Deviation and DOMA." 2013. 21 Am. U. J. Gender, Soc. Pol'y & L 70; The 'Federal Law of Marriage': Deference, Deviation, and DOMA
- "Same Sex Marriage Passage". CQ Weekly. Congressional Quarterly. May 2, 2005.
- "Litigating the Defense of Marriage Act: The Next Battleground for Same-Sex Marriage." 2004. 117 Harv. L. Rev. 2684. doi:10.2307/4093411. JSTOR 4093411.
- Manning, Jason (April 30, 2004). "Backgrounder: The Defense of Marriage Act". The Online News Hour. The News Hour with Jim Lehrer. Archived from the original on November 9, 2013.
- United States. 104th Congress. Defense of Marriage Act. House of Representatives Committee Report. 1996.
- Wardle, Lynn D. "A Critical Analysis of Constitutional Claims for Same Sex Marriage." 1996. 1996 B.Y.U.L. Rev. 1.
