= Bipartisan Legal Advisory Group =

Standing body of the U.S. House of Representatives

The Bipartisan Legal Advisory Group (BLAG) has been a standing body of the U.S. House of Representatives since 1993 that directs the activities of the House Office of General Counsel. BLAG can direct the General Counsel to participate in litigation or file an amicus curiae brief in cases involving the interests of the House or BLAG can call for legislation or a House resolution authorizing the General Counsel to represent the House itself. BLAG comprises five members of House leadership:

- The Speaker
- Majority leader
- Minority leader
- Majority whip
- Minority whip

The House Office of General Counsel evolved from a low-level position that handled routine contracts. In the mid-1970s Speaker Tip O'Neil authorized it to handle constitutional questions, though it remained under the supervision of the House Clerk. Prior to the establishment of the office, members of Congress filed the amicus briefs themselves. The House authorized the Speaker to intervene in Chadha v. INS, and after that lawsuit's resolution in 1983 the five members of the House leadership, without authorization from the House, established the House Bipartisan Leadership Group to represent the interests of the House in litigation, which it did several times as either intervenor or amicus over the next decade.

On January 5, 1993, the Democratic-majority House adopted a rule creating the Office of General Counsel under the control of the Speaker "who shall consult with a Bipartisan Legal Advisory Group which shall include the majority and minority leaderships." Republicans had offered without success an amendment that would have required approval by the entire House for the Office of Counsel to undertake certain kinds of litigation and enhanced BLAG's control of the office.

BLAG has acted in a wide range of cases. In 1997, BLAG filed an amicus brief in Raines v. Byrd, an unsuccessful challenge to the Line Item Veto Act of 1996. During consideration of Dickerson v. United States (2000), BLAG submitted an amicus brief to the Fourth Circuit and to the Supreme Court arguing that judicial review of a statute should not extend to the political considerations underlying its enactment. In 2002, when a group of Democratic congressmen sued the Bush administration over access to census information, BLAG's Republican majority had the Office of House Council oppose them and argue that courts should not interfere in such disputes between the executive and legislative branches. In 2004, BLAG filed an amicus brief in Elk Grove Unified School District v. Newdow in support of a school district's practice of leading students in the recitation of the Pledge of Allegiance, including the words "under God." During the criminal proceedings against Rep. William Jefferson of Louisiana, following a unanimous vote of its five members, BLAG filed a brief calling for the return of papers seized from Jefferson's offices by the FBI in May 2006.

== Defending the Defense of Marriage Act ==
In 2011, when President Barack Obama announced that the U.S. Department of Justice (DOJ) would no longer defend the constitutionality of Section 3 of the Defense of Marriage Act (DOMA), House Speaker John Boehner convened BLAG to authorize the House Office of General Counsel or other outside attorneys to take the place of the DOJ in defending the law. On March 9, 2011, BLAG by a vote of 3–2 directed the Office of General Counsel to defend DOMA. Attorneys representing BLAG filed a brief in U.S. District Court in San Francisco in Golinski v. Office of Personnel Management, opposing an action brought by a federal employee to invalidate Section 3 of DOMA under which health insurance coverage to her same-sex spouse was denied. In Golinski and a series of lawsuits challenging DOMA, BLAG's role has not been limited to filing amicus briefs. Without opposition from opposing counsel, several District Courts have granted BLAG intervenor-defendant status. In one DOMA case, McLaughlin v. Panetta, plaintiffs' attorneys asked the court, without success, to limit BLAG to filing an amicus curiae brief rather than participating as intervenor-defendant as it did in other DOMA cases. They argued that the House did not properly authorize BLAG to intervene and that BLAG's direct participation violated the separation of powers doctrine. The DOJ also questioned BLAG's standing to appeal a District Court decision, relying on Buckley v. Valeo (1976). Democratic House Minority Leader Nancy Pelosi questioned the funding of BLAG's defense of DOMA, which in January 2013 BLAG capped at $3 million.

On December 7, 2012, the Supreme Court, in agreeing to hear another DOMA case, United States v. Windsor, asked the parties to address "whether the Bipartisan Legal Advisory Group of the United States House of Representatives has Article III standing in this case". Article III of the U.S. Constitution restricts the judiciary to hearing cases and controversies, which the Supreme Court has long interpreted to require parties to a case to have a direct interest in the outcome, rather than the "generalized interest" that the Department of Justice claims BLAG has in the defense of DOMA. BLAG has countered, citing the Supreme Court's decision in Chadha that "Congress is ... a proper party" to defend the validity of a statute" in such circumstances.

On January 3, 2013, at the start of the 113th Congress, the House of Representatives included in its rules a provision authorizing BLAG to defend DOMA and related laws, mentioning the Windsor case by name. It also made BLAG's role explicit: "the Bipartisan Legal Advisory Group continues to speak for, and articulate the institutional position of, the House in all litigation matters in which it appears". The Supreme Court ruled against BLAG in Windsor on June 26, and on July 18, BLAG acknowledged that in Windsor "[t]he Supreme Court recently resolved the issue of DOMA Section 3's constitutionality" and said "it no longer will defend that statute".

Justice Anthony Kennedy's decision for the majority in Windsor noted that BLAG's participation in the case helped reassure the court that it was presented proper adversarial argument despite the fact that principal parties to the case, the administration and Windsor, were not at odds. The court also found that it "need not decide whether BLAG would have standing to challenge the District Court’s ruling and its affirmance in the Court of Appeals on BLAG's own authority." Justice Alito in dissent nevertheless argued that BLAG should have been allowed to defend the statute. He wrote that it was properly authorized to act on behalf of the House and had standing as an aggrieved party once part of DOMA was ruled unconstitutional because "the House of Representatives was a necessary party to DOMA's passage". He concluded: "in the narrow category of cases in which a court strikes down an Act of Congress and the Executive declines to defend the Act, Congress both has standing to defend the undefended statute and is a proper party to do so." Justice Scalia in his dissent, without addressing the immediate instance of BLAG's standing, wrote that Alito's theory would improperly elevate the role of the courts and substitute lawsuits initiated by Congress or the executive branch for the political process.

== See also ==
- Cardona v. Shinseki
