= Burns v. Hickenlooper =

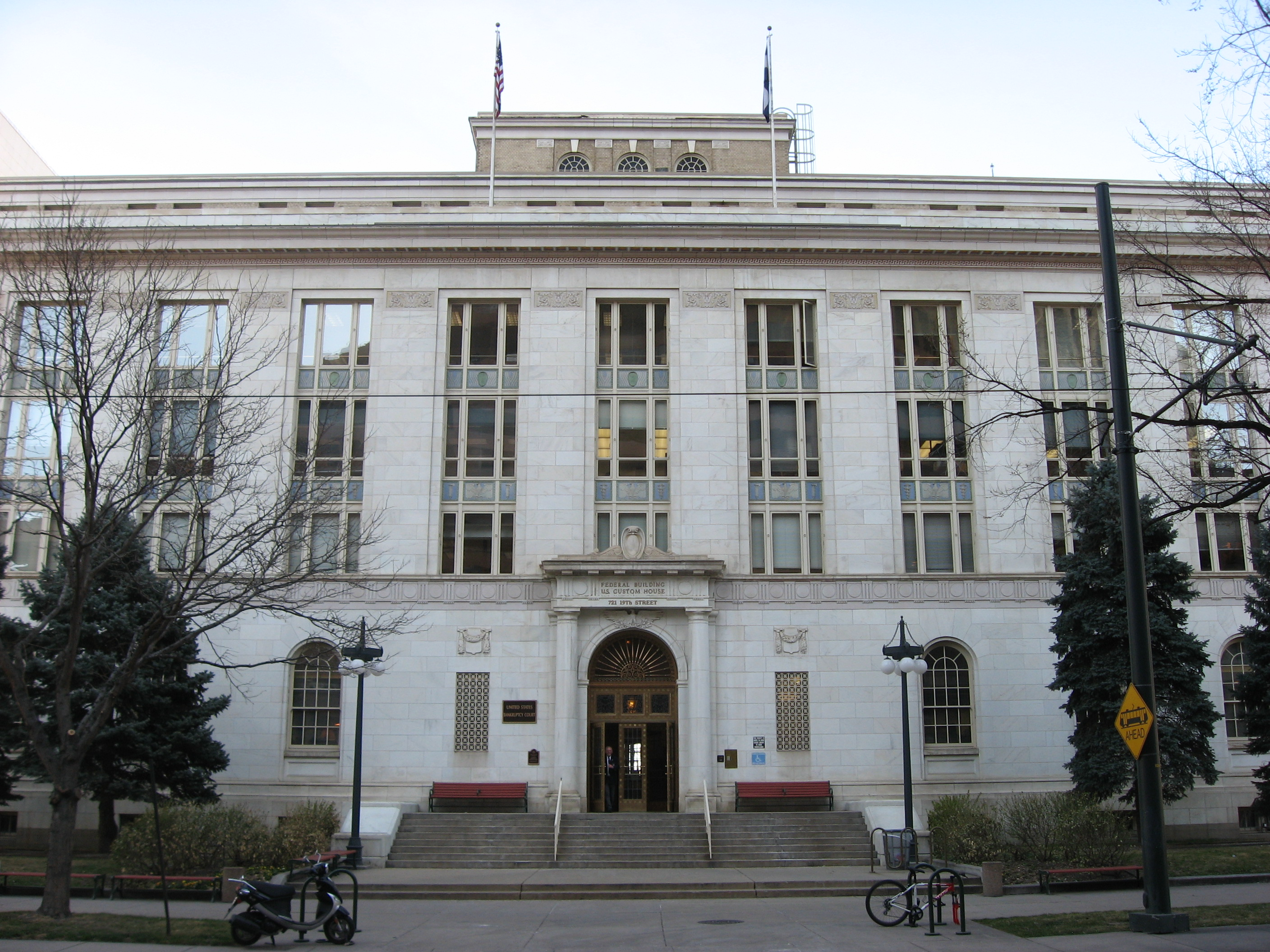
- No. 1:14-cv-01817
- Court: U.S. District Court for the District of Colorado
- Decided: July 23, 2014
- Citation: 2014 WL 3634834

Case history
- Subsequent action: Stay ordered sub nom. Burns v. Suthers (10th Cir. August 21, 2014).

Holding
- Plaintiffs' motion for a preliminary injunction is granted. Colorado is enjoined from enforcing its ban on same-sex marriage as such is unconstitutional.

Court membership
- Judges sitting: Raymond P. Moore, U.S.D.J.

Keywords
- Same-sex marriage

Burns v. Hickenlooper is a lawsuit filed on July 1, 2014, in federal district court in Colorado, challenging that state's denial of marriage rights to same-sex couples. The plaintiffs' complaint alleged that the defendants have violated the Fourteenth Amendment by denying plaintiffs the fundamental right of marriage. The defendants agreed with the substance of the plaintiffs' case, but asked the district court to stay implementation of any order requiring Colorado to alter enforcement of its ban pending the outcome of other litigation. After the district court declined to grant more than a one-month stay on July 23, the state's governor and attorney general appealed and won a stay from the Tenth Circuit Court of Appeals on August 21. Following U.S. Supreme Court action in other cases, on October 8 they asked the Tenth Circuit to dismiss their appeal and lift the stay, which would effectively legalize same-sex marriage in Colorado.

== Complaint ==
The case was filed by attorneys in private practice on July 1, 2014, in the U.S. District Court for the District of Colorado. The plaintiffs were six same-sex couples. Two of the couples had been refused marriage licenses in Colorado. Another two had been married in California and one on Washington state. The sixth couple, like several others, had a Colorado civil union. The complaint referenced the recent Tenth Circuit decision in Kitchen v. Herbert. The main defendants, the state's governor and attorney general, agreed with the plaintiffs that the court should issue an injunction declaring the same-sex marriage ban unconstitutional, but wanted the court to stay that injunction pending resolution of the question by the U.S. Supreme Court.

== Status conference and hearing ==
On July 15, 2014, U.S. District Judge Raymond P. Moore held an expedited status conference. Since the defendants stipulated that the Colorado same-sex marriage ban violates the U.S. Constitution, the court considered the state's request for a stay of its injunction ordering Colorado to end its enforcement of its restrictions on the recognition of same-sex marriage. On July 22, Judge Moore heard oral arguments for and against a stay.

== District court ruling ==
Judge Raymond Moore issued an order in Burns v. Hickenlooper on July 23, granting the plaintiff same-sex couples' motion for a preliminary injunction. In his ruling, Judge Moore noted that the state defendants agreed that the stay should be granted even though they disagreed about Kitchen, with the Attorney General believing the decision incorrect and the governor believing it correctly decided. The judge found the plaintiffs met their burden for an injunction, but denied the defendants' request for a stay. He noted the defendants relied on the fact that most other U.S. courts considering same-sex marriage so far have issued stays and that the U.S. Supreme Court has been staying same-sex marriage cases as well, most recently in Herbert v. Evans. But he declined to deny access to a fundamental right on the part of Coloradans without clear guidance to the contrary from the U.S. Supreme Court. He issued a temporary, one-month stay to give the defendants time to appeal.

== Appeal and stay ==
The state defendants immediately filed a notice of appeal and applied for a stay in the Tenth Circuit Court of Appeals. On August 21, Circuit Judges Harris Hartz and David Ebel granted the state attorney general's application for a stay. In their order, they cited similar stays granted in Kitchen v. Herbert and Bishop v. Oklahoma upon filing of petitions for certiorari and wrote: "[i]n the interests of consistency, we see no reason to deviate from this approach in this case." The judges also noted that one day earlier the U.S. Supreme Court had issued a stay in McQuigg v. Bostic. The Tenth Circuit suspended further proceedings in the case on September 18.

On October 6, Colorado Attorney General John Suthers asked the Tenth Circuit to dismiss the state's appeal and lift the stay so that Colorado would be required to recognize same-sex marriage.

== See also ==
- LGBT rights in Colorado
- Same-sex marriage in Colorado
- Recognition of same-sex unions in Colorado
