= Utah Senate Bill 297 =

2015 Utah law

Senate Bill 297 is a 2015 Utah anti-LGBT act that allows for an exemption for individuals, religious officials, religious organizations, and government officers and employees who object to participating to issuing marriage licenses for marriages they object to based on "deeply held beliefs about marriage, family, and sexuality."

== Background ==
On December 20, 2013, District Judge Robert J. Shelby, in the case of Kitchen v. Herbert, struck down the same-sex marriage ban as unconstitutional, thus legalizing same-sex marriage in Utah. The United States Supreme Court granted a stay on Shelby's ruling on January 6, 2014, pending a decision by the United States Tenth Circuit.

On October 6, 2014, the United States Supreme Court denied without comment the petitions for certiorari, in the case of Kitchen v. Herbert, along with petitions from four other states. It allowed the ruling from the court of appeals to stand, effectively re-legalizing same-sex marriage in Utah.

== Legislative history ==
On March 11, 2015, the Utah House of Representatives passed, with 66 yeas and 9 nays, Senate Bill 297. On March 12, 2015, the Utah Senate passed, with 25 yeas, 3 nays, 1 absent or not voting, SB 297. On March 20, 2015, Governor Gary Herbert signed the bill, which became Session Law Chapter: 046, and it went into effect on May 12, 2015.

== Response ==
On March 6, 2015, the ACLU of Utah came out strongly opposing SB 297.

== See also ==
- LGBT rights in Utah
- Same-sex marriage in Utah
