= Same-sex marriage in Utah =

Same-sex marriage has been legal in Utah since October 6, 2014. On December 20, 2013, the state began issuing marriage licenses to same-sex couples as a result of the U.S. District Court for the District of Utah's ruling in the case of Kitchen v. Herbert, which found that barring same-sex couples from marrying violates the U.S. Constitution. The issuance of those licenses was halted during the period of January 6, 2014 until October 6, 2014, following the resolution of a lawsuit challenging the state's ban on same-sex marriage. On that day, following the U.S. Supreme Court's refusal to hear an appeal in a case that found Utah's ban on same-sex marriage unconstitutional, the Tenth Circuit Court of Appeals ordered the state to recognize same-sex marriage.

Same-sex marriage became temporarily legal in Utah on December 20, 2013, as a result of a ruling from the U.S. District Court for the District of Utah. The U.S. Supreme Court stayed the ruling on January 6, 2014, while the Tenth Circuit Court of Appeals in Denver considered the case. On June 25, 2014, the Tenth Circuit upheld the lower court ruling, a decision that set a precedent for every state within the circuit. However, the Tenth Circuit stayed its ruling. On October 6, the Supreme Court refused to hear the state's appeal, requiring Utah to license and recognize same-sex marriages. Same-sex marriages that were performed in December 2013 and January 2014 are recognized by the federal government, but a ruling requiring the state of Utah to recognize such marriages was stayed by the U.S. Supreme Court on July 18, 2014. The state later asked the Tenth Circuit to dismiss its appeal in this case.

Polling suggests that a majority of Utahns support the legal recognition of same-sex marriage.

== Legal history ==
=== Statute ===
In 1977, the Utah State Legislature passed a statute banning same-sex marriage in the state. In 1995, the House of Representatives passed legislation (known as H.B. 366) banning recognition of out-of-state same-sex marriages and unions in the state. On March 1, 1995, the Senate voted 24–1 in favor of the bill, and on the same day Governor Mike Leavitt signed it into law.

In 2004, the State Legislature passed a bill (S.B. 24) banning same-sex marriages and its "substantially equivalent" in the state. Governor Olene Walker signed the bill into law on March 23, 2004, and it went into effect that same day.

=== Constitution ===
On March 3, 2004, the Utah Senate voted 20–7 in favor of Amendment 3, a constitutional amendment banning same-sex marriage and any "domestic union" that grants "the same or substantially equivalent legal effect". The House of Representatives voted 58–14 in favor of the amendment that same day. On November 2, 2004, Utah voters approved of the amendment by a margin of 65.8% to 33.2%. It went into effect on January 1, 2005.

=== Lawsuits ===
==== Kitchen v. Herbert ====
===== District Court =====
On March 25, 2013, three same-sex couples, including one already married in Iowa, filed a lawsuit in the U.S. District Court for the District of Utah seeking to declare Utah's prohibition on the recognition of same-sex marriages unconstitutional under the Due Process and Equal Protection clauses of the U.S. Constitution. The court heard oral arguments on December 4. The state argued that there was "nothing unusual" in enforcing policies that encourage "responsible procreation" and the "optimal mode of child-rearing". The plaintiffs' attorney contended that the policy was "based on prejudice and bias that is religiously grounded in this state". On December 20, 2013, District Judge Robert J. Shelby struck down the same-sex marriage ban as unconstitutional. He wrote:

Amendment 3 perpetuates inequality by holding that the families and relationships of same-sex couples are not now, nor ever will be, worthy of recognition. Amendment 3 does not thereby elevate the status of opposite-sex marriage; it merely demeans the dignity of same-sex couples. And while the State cites an interest in protecting traditional marriage, it protects that interest by denying one of the most traditional aspects of marriage to thousands of its citizens: the right to form a family that is strengthened by a partnership based on love, intimacy, and shared responsibilities.

It was the first federal court decision to address state recognition of same-sex marriage since the U.S. Supreme Court's decision in United States v. Windsor that held Section 3 of the federal Defense of Marriage Act (DOMA), which denied federal recognition to same-sex marriages, unconstitutional.

===== Marriage licenses issued =====
During the first six days following the ruling, Utah county clerks issued marriage licenses to more than 900 same-sex couples. Historian J. Seth Anderson and neuroscientist Michael Ferguson were the first couple to legally marry in Utah on December 20. State Senator Jim Dabakis, chairman of the Utah Democratic Party, was one of the first to get married in Salt Lake City. Mayor Ralph Becker officiated at his ceremony and at dozens more. Two couples in Washington County became the first same-sex couples to marry in a county other than Salt Lake County, shortly before the county clerk's office closed on December 20.

Officials in Salt Lake County, the most populous county in the state, began issuing marriage licenses to same-sex couples immediately after the ruling. The Salt Lake County District Attorney, Sim Gill, said that the ruling prevented the state from enforcing the ban: "The current state of the law is that we cannot prohibit [the marriages]." Weber County announced plans to open Saturday, the day after the ruling, to process marriage licenses for same-sex couples, but canceled its plans citing "security requirements" and concerns that opening early could violate "equal protection provisions". Davis County began issuing licenses on Monday, December 23.

Some Utah County officials initially declined to grant marriage licenses to same-sex couples, saying they were still reviewing the ruling and consulting with their county attorneys. Several continued to do so on December 23, the Monday following the ruling, including Box Elder, Carbon, Juab, San Juan, Sanpete, Sevier and Utah counties. Officials in Sanpete and Sevier counties said they would begin offering licenses to same-sex couples on December 24. Cache County closed its clerk's office altogether "to sort out the legal issues and confusion created in the wake of Judge Shelby's decision", and began issuing licenses to same-sex couples the next day. The Piute County Clerk's Office was closed both days and the clerk was on vacation. All counties but Box Elder, Piute, San Juan and Utah counties were issuing or willing to issue same-sex marriage licenses on December 24. Following the Tenth Circuit's denial of the state's request for a stay of Shelby's order, Utah County Clerk Bryan Thompson announced that the county would issue marriage licenses to same-sex couples on December 26. The remaining counties of Box Elder, Piute and San Juan also announced they would issue licenses.

===== Reaction and appeal by the state =====
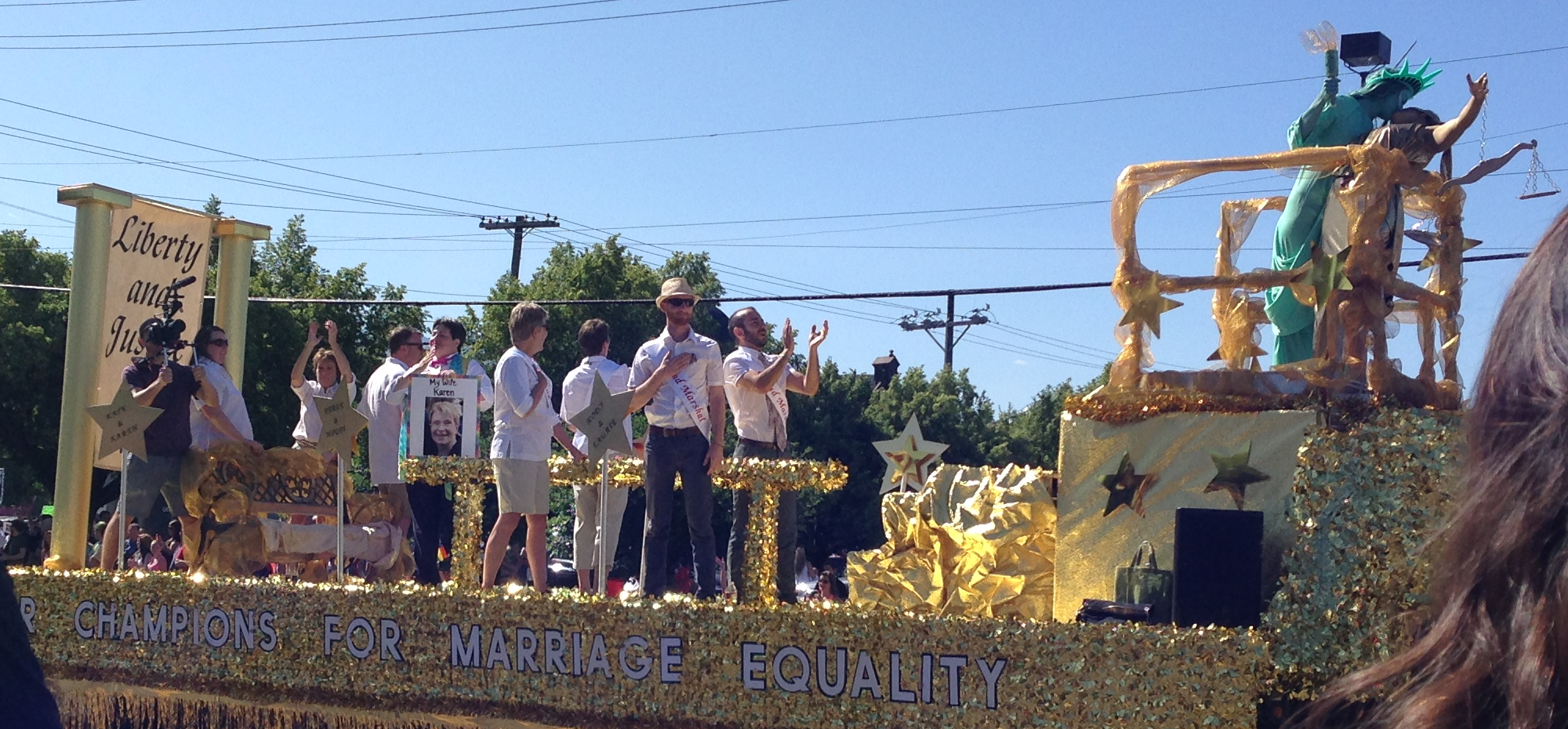
The Kitchen plaintiffs participating as grand marshals at the Utah Pride Festival in Salt Lake City, June 2014

Utah Governor Gary Herbert responded to Shelby's ruling the same day saying: "I am very disappointed an activist federal judge is attempting to override the will of the people of Utah. I am working with my legal counsel and the acting Attorney General to determine the best course to defend traditional marriage within the borders of Utah." On December 24, he instructed members of his cabinet that "where no conflicting laws exist you should conduct business in compliance with the federal judge's ruling until such time that the current district court decision is addressed by the 10th Circuit Court." Bishop John Wester of the Roman Catholic Diocese of Salt Lake City called the decision "an affront to an institution that is at once sacred and natural". Some other religious leaders welcomed the decision, including representatives of the Unitarian Universalist Association and Bishop Scott Hayashi of the Episcopal Diocese of Utah, who also advised "compassion" for those who objected to the ruling: "The change that this represents will cause them heartache, frustration and a feeling that our country is going in the wrong direction."

The Attorney General's office appealed the ruling to the Tenth Circuit Court of Appeals and sought an emergency stay to prevent additional licenses from being issued to same-sex couples. The Tenth Circuit rejected the requested motion for a stay on December 22 "[b]ecause the motion before us does not meet the requirements of the federal or local appellate rules governing a request for a stay". On December 23, Shelby denied a request for a stay, and the Tenth Circuit denied the state's second emergency motion for a temporary stay. On December 24, the Tenth Circuit again denied the state's request for a stay. On December 31, the state asked the U.S. Supreme Court to issue a stay, which it granted on January 6, pending a decision by the Tenth Circuit.

On January 9, Attorney General Sean Reyes advised county clerks to complete processing marriage licenses for same-sex couples whose marriages were solemnized "prior to the morning of January 6". The state announced that under the stay it would return to enforcing Utah's ban on licensing and recognizing same-sex marriages. On January 10, U.S. Attorney General Eric Holder announced that the federal government would recognize the 1,360 same-sex marriages that had been performed in Utah prior to the stay. Several attorneys general of states that had already legalized same-sex marriage also announced they would recognize the Utah marriages. According to rules issued on January 15 by the Utah Tax Commission, a same-sex couple who file a joint federal income tax return can file a joint return for their Utah income taxes as well. On January 16, the Utah Attorney General's office announced it had hired Gene C. Schaerr, a veteran litigator in state and federal appellate courts, to assist in its defense of Utah's ban on same-sex marriage. Oral arguments in the case were heard on April 10, 2014.

On June 25, the Tenth Circuit affirmed the district court's decision, but also stayed implementation of its decision, pending a further appeal or certiorari. "The Fourteenth Amendment protects the fundamental right to marry, establish a family, raise children, and enjoy the full protection of a state's marital laws," the court wrote in its 2–1 ruling. "A state may not deny the issuance of a marriage license to two persons, or refuse to recognize their marriage, based solely upon the sex of the persons in the marriage union." On August 5, the Utah Attorney General's office asked the U.S. Supreme Court to consider the case. On October 6, the U.S. Supreme Court rejected Utah's appeal without comment, allowing the Tenth Circuit to lift its stay. In response, Governor Herbert and Attorney General Reyes announced that Utah would comply with the decision of the Supreme Court and swiftly advised state agencies to recognize same-sex marriages.

==== Evans v. Herbert ====
Once a stay was granted in Kitchen, Utah returned to its practice of denying marriage licenses to same-sex couples and it no longer recognized the validity of those marriages established by same-sex couples in Utah while Judge Shelby's ruling was in effect in December 2013 and January 2014. On January 21, 2014, the American Civil Liberties Union (ACLU) brought suit on behalf of four same-sex couples married in Utah during that period, raising concerns about the impact of Utah's action on their adoption, parenting, and health care rights. On May 19, U.S. District Court Judge Dale A. Kimball ruled in Evans v. Herbert that Utah must recognize the same-sex marriages performed in Utah the previous December and January. On June 4, the state appealed Judge Kimball's ruling before it took effect. The Tenth Circuit announced on July 11 it would not issue a permanent stay while the state appealed Kimball's decision. The state asked the U.S. Supreme Court to issue the stay, and on July 18 Justice Sonia Sotomayor, after referring the question to the other members of the court, granted the stay pending resolution of the case by the Tenth Circuit. In August, the Tenth Circuit granted the state's request for an additional month to file its appeal, setting October 22 as the deadline.

After the U.S. Supreme Court refused to hear Kitchen, Utah officials asked the Tenth Circuit to dismiss its appeal in this case, ending its attempt to deny recognition to the December and January same-sex marriages. The order and permanent injunction was issued on November 24, 2014 by the United States District Court for Utah, Central Division.

=== Developments after legalization ===
On March 11, 2015, the House of Representatives passed Senate Bill 297, by a 66–9 vote, providing an exemption to individuals, religious officials, religious organizations, and government officers and employees who object to participating or issuing marriage licenses based on their "deeply held beliefs about marriage, family, and sexuality". The Senate passed the bill 25–3 with 1 abstention on March 12. Governor Gary Herbert signed the bill into law on March 20, and it went into effect on May 12, 2015.

A bill to amend Utah's marriage statutes was introduced by Representative Kraig Powell on February 5, 2016. The bill sought to make all mentions to marriage in Utah law gender-neutral, replacing all references to "husband and wife" with "spouses" or "married couple". It would have also removed the statutory same-sex marriage ban enacted in 1977. The bill was assigned to the House Rules Committee on February 8; however, it was not heard in committee and died at the end of the 2016 general session on March 10. A bill to update Utah's adoption laws by replacing "mother and father" with "parents" was introduced to the Senate on February 18, 2016, but it also failed to pass before March 10. On March 10, 2016, Senator Jim Dabakis successfully delayed a vote on a bill that sought to change the definition of joint tenants from "any legally married couple" to "husband and wife". The bill would have prevented same-sex couples from being legitimate joint tenants under Utah law. The bill had been approved in the House earlier in March and its final reading in the Senate was scheduled for March 10, the last day of the 2016 general session. Dabakis delayed the final reading of the bill for several minutes before midnight by sneezing and coughing. As the bill failed to pass before midnight March 10, it died, and no similar bill was brought up in successive legislative sessions.

All four Utah representatives in the U.S. House, Republicans Blake Moore, Chris Stewart, John Curtis and Burgess Owens, voted in favor of the Respect for Marriage Act in July 2022. The Act would officially repeal DOMA and require the federal government to recognize same-sex and interracial marriages, codifying parts of both the Obergefell v. Hodges and Loving v. Virginia rulings. Curtis said, "I understand how important codifying these protections are to many Utahns. I do not believe the federal government should infringe upon an individual's decision about who they wish to marry." LGBT advocates praised the representatives for their votes. The Act was amended in the U.S. Senate and passed on November 29, with the support of Senator Mitt Romney. The House approved the amended version on December 8, 2022, and President Joe Biden signed it into law five days later.

== Native American nations ==
Same-sex marriage is not recognized in the Navajo Nation, following the passage of the Diné Marriage Act in 2005. A bill to legalize same-sex marriage was introduced to the Navajo Nation Council by Delegate Eugene Tso of Chinle in July 2022. Another bill was introduced by Delegate Seth Damon in June 2023. It would allow Navajo Nation citizens to receive marriage licenses through the tribe and require the tribal government to recognize same-sex marriages licensed outside the reservation. President Buu Nygren supports the bill.

While there are no records of same-sex marriages as understood from a Western perspective being performed in Native American cultures, there is evidence for identities and behaviours that may be placed on the LGBT spectrum. Many of these cultures recognized two-spirit individuals who were born male but wore women's clothing and performed everyday household work and artistic handiwork which were regarded as belonging to the feminine sphere. Navajo culture has traditionally recognized two-spirit individuals known in the Navajo language as nádleehi (pronounced [nátɬèːhì]). While the nádleehi had access to both masculine and feminine spheres of work, aside from hunting and warfare, they typically pursued feminine activities such as pottery making, weaving and tanning of hides, but also chanting, which was primarily a men's activity. Associated with prosperity and believed to have originated in the third world of the Holy People, the nádleehi directed the planting and the fieldwork, and generally functioned as head of a household. They were known for their skills in matchmaking and mediated between the sexes in matters of conflict and love. Traditionally, "real" nádleehi did not marry and had sexual intercourse exclusively with men, while "those who pretend to be nádleehi" could marry either men or women but if they married they would generally take on the clothing and activities of a man. The nádleehi status thus created the possibility of a marriage between two biological males in Navajo culture.

The Law and Order Code of the Ute Indian Tribe of the Uintah and Ouray Reservation does not expressly forbid same-sex marriages, but requires that the couple take each other as "husband and wife". The Ute people refer to two-spirit individuals who were born male but carried out women's work in the community as tuwasawich (pronounced [tuˈwasawitʃ]). Traditionally, the tuwasawich could marry men or women, while some remained unmarried.

== Demographics and marriage statistics ==
Data from the 2000 U.S. census showed that 3,370 same-sex couples were living in Utah. By 2005, this had increased to 4,307 couples, likely attributed to same-sex couples' growing willingness to disclose their partnerships on government surveys. Same-sex couples lived in all counties of the state and constituted 0.7% of coupled households and 0.5% of all households in the state. Most couples lived in Salt Lake, Weber and Utah counties, but the counties with the highest percentage of same-sex couples were Piute (0.79% of all county households) and Duchesne (0.77%). Same-sex partners in Utah were on average younger than opposite-sex partners, and more likely to be employed. In addition, the average and median household incomes of same-sex couples were higher than different-sex couples, but same-sex couples were far less likely to own a home than opposite-sex partners. 19% of same-sex couples in Utah were raising children under the age of 18, with an estimated 1,226 children living in households headed by same-sex couples in 2005.

The 2020 U.S. census showed that there were 5,271 married same-sex couple households (2,490 male couples and 2,781 female couples) and 3,402 unmarried same-sex couple households in Utah.

== Domestic partnerships ==
In 2005, Utah Senator Greg Bell, a Republican from the 22nd Senate District in Davis County, sponsored legislation (S.B. 89; "Mutual Dependence Benefits Contract") to provide "for the creation of mutual dependence benefits contracts, which would have allowed two adults, not eligible for marriage, to share certain rights and responsibilities regarding property ownership or health-related matters". The bill was unsuccessful.

Utah State University administrators planned to create a domestic partnership registry in early 2005, but university legal counsel Craig Simper said it might violate the Utah Constitution. He said that the marriage amendment required that "no other domestic union may be recognized as a marriage or given the same or substantially equal legal effect." He said that the university "does not want to be the test case and does not intend to be the test case". University Professor Barry Franklin gathered enough petition signatures on November 20, 2005 to raise the issue of giving domestic partner benefits to university employees, including those in same-sex relationships, at the University Faculty Senate. Senate members voted on December 5, 2005 to continue researching the matter.

Jenny Wilson, a member of the Salt Lake County Council, unsuccessfully sponsored an ordinance in 2005 to provide domestic partner benefits to county government employees, including those who are in same-sex relationships. Wilson sponsored a similar ordinance in 2009, which was approved. In 2013, the Salt Lake County Council approved a mutual commitment registry.

In 2005, Mayor Rocky Anderson signed an executive order providing domestic partner benefits to city employees in Salt Lake City, including those who are in same-sex relationships. The Arizona-based religious legal action group Alliance Defense Fund sued the city, claiming that the order violated the Utah Constitution. The American Civil Liberties Union joined the city in defending the order, saying it protected "the right to be free from discrimination based on their relationships and the right to equal compensation for equal work." On May 11, 2006, Third District Judge Stephen L. Roth ruled in Norman v. Anderson that the domestic partner benefit plan did not violate state law. Roth acknowledged the arguments in favor of providing more expansive benefit plans, noting that "as a practical matter single employees may have relationships outside of marriage, whether motivated by family feeling, emotional attachment or practical considerations, which draw on their resources to provide the necessaries of life, including health care". The Salt Lake City Council adopted an ordinance in 2008 that provides a mutual commitment registry to "unmarried domestic partners—gay or straight—and to other adults in financially dependent relationships, such as a person caring for an aging parent".

Members of the school district board of education in Park City adopted a policy in 2011 that provides domestic partner benefits to district employees, including those who are in same-sex relationships. The board of education of the Salt Lake City School District adopted a similar policy several months later.

== Public opinion ==
Public opinion for same-sex marriage in Utah
| Poll source | Dates administered | Sample size | Margin of error | Support | Opposition | Do not know / refused |
|---|---|---|---|---|---|---|
| Public Religion Research Institute | March 9 – December 7, 2023 | 226 adults | ? | 65% | 34% | 1% |
| Public Religion Research Institute | March 11 – December 14, 2022 | ? | ? | 65% | 34% | 1% |
| Dan Jones & Associates | September 3–21, 2022 | 815 registered voters | ± 3.4% | 72% | 23% | 5% |
| Public Religion Research Institute | March 8 – November 9, 2021 | ? | ? | 56% | 43% | 1% |
| Public Religion Research Institute | January 7 – December 20, 2020 | 554 adults | ? | 57% | 39% | 4% |
| Public Religion Research Institute | April 5 – December 23, 2017 | 732 adults | ? | 54% | 38% | 8% |
| Public Religion Research Institute | May 18, 2016 – January 10, 2017 | 1,056 adults | ? | 51% | 41% | 8% |
| Utah Policy | June 8–17, 2016 | 614 registered voters | ± 4.0% | 42% | 52% | 6% |
| Public Religion Research Institute | April 29, 2015 – January 7, 2016 | 813 adults | ? | 46% | 47% | 7% |
| Dan Jones & Associates | October 14–16, 2014 | 405 registered voters | ± 4.9% | 37% | 58% | 5% |
| New York Times/CBS News/YouGov | September 20 – October 1, 2014 | 935 likely voters | ± 3.7% | 34% | 56% | 10% |
| Benenson Strategy Group | September 21–23, 2014 | 500 adults | ± 4.4% | 49% | 48% | 3% |
| Dan Jones & Associates | August 12–14, 2014 | 400 likely voters | ± 4.9% | 29% | 61% | 10% |
| Dan Jones & Associates/Cicero Group | January 14–16, 2014 | 746 adults | ± 3.6% | 36% | 57% | 7% |
| SurveyUSA | January 10–13, 2014 | 600 adults | ± 4.1% | 48% | 48% | 4% |
| Public Policy Polling | July 8–10, 2011 | 723 voters | ± 4.6% | 27% | 66% | 7% |

According to the opinion poll conducted on the issue in September 2022 by Dan Jones & Associates for the Deseret News/Hinckley Institute of Politics, 72% of Utah registered voters supported same-sex marriage. Support varied with sex, political affiliation, age, and degree of church attendance; it was higher among women (75%) than men (70%), higher among Democrats (94%) than Republicans (61%), and higher among "very liberal" and "somewhat liberal" voters (95%) than "somewhat conservative" voters (69%) and "very conservative" voters (42%). 89% of 18–24-year-olds also favored same-sex marriage with support decreasing with age, but no age group showed majority opposition. With regard to church attendance, 58% of "very active" members of the Church of Jesus Christ of Latter-day Saints supported same-sex marriage, compared to 76% of "somewhat active" and "not active" members.

== See also ==
- LGBT rights in Utah
- Same-sex marriage in the United States
