= Hickenlooper =

Hickenlooper is a surname. Notable people with the surname include:

- Andrew Hickenlooper (1837–1904), American Civil War general and politician
- Bourke B. Hickenlooper (1896–1971), American politician from Iowa
- George Hickenlooper (1963–2010), American documentary filmmaker
- John Hickenlooper (born 1952), American politician from Colorado
- Lucy Mary Agnes Hickenlooper, birth name of American pianist Olga Samaroff (1880–1948)
- Smith Hickenlooper (1880–1933), American judge

== See also ==
- Baca v. Hickenlooper, a case from the United States Court of Appeals for the Tenth Circuit on the constitutionality of laws punishing a faithless elector in the United States Electoral College
- Burns v. Hickenlooper, a lawsuit filed on July 1, 2014, in federal district court in Colorado, challenging that state's denial of marriage rights to same-sex couples
