= Status conference =

Update meeting ordered by court

A status conference (sometimes called an early conference) is a court-ordered meeting with a judge (or under some circumstances an authorized counsel) where a trial date (or other case deadlines) is decided. The meeting may also involve getting updated information on a defendant for ongoing conditions, set forth previously by the courts, such as house arrest or home monitoring. It can also involve the discussion of a plea bargain or result in a settlement.

If a party does not attend the status conference, that party's requests for scheduling changes will be ignored, and they may be fined. If the plaintiff and/or a representative of plaintiff does not attend the status conference, the action may be dismissed.
