= Same-sex marriage in Oklahoma =

Same-sex marriage has been legal in Oklahoma since October 6, 2014, following the resolution of a lawsuit challenging the state's ban on same-sex marriage. On that day, following the U.S. Supreme Court's refusal to review Bishop v. Smith, a case that had found the ban unconstitutional, the Tenth Circuit Court of Appeals ordered Oklahoma to recognize same-sex marriages. On January 14, 2014, Judge Terence C. Kern of the U.S. District Court for the Northern District of Oklahoma declared the state's statutory and constitutional same-sex marriage bans unconstitutional. The case, Bishop v. Smith (formerly Bishop v. Oklahoma and Bishop v. United States), was stayed pending appeal. On July 18, 2014, a panel of the Tenth Circuit upheld Kern's ruling overturning Oklahoma's same-sex marriage ban. However, the panel put its ruling on hold pending disposition of a petition for certiorari by the U.S. Supreme Court. On October 6, 2014, the Supreme Court rejected the request for review, leaving the Tenth Circuit Court's ruling in place. State officials responded by implementing the Tenth Circuit's ruling, recognizing same-sex marriage in the state.

== Legal history ==
=== Restrictions ===
In 1975, the Oklahoma Legislature passed its first statute defining marriage as between "one man and one woman". In 1996, the Oklahoma Legislature passed another piece of legislation, defining marriage as between "one man and one woman" and prohibiting same-sex marriages performed out-of-state from being recognized in Oklahoma. In April 2013, the Oklahoma House of Representatives passed a non-binding resolution reaffirming marriage as "between one man and one woman", and urging the U.S. Supreme Court to uphold Section 3 of the Defense of Marriage Act (DOMA) and the right of states to regulate marriage. It passed 84–0, with 71 Republicans and 13 Democrats voting in favor. 16 Democrats walked out of the chamber in protest rather than vote. The Oklahoma Senate approved the resolution later that same month. The U.S. Supreme Court struck down Section 3 of DOMA in United States v. Windsor on June 26, 2013.

In April 2004, the Oklahoma Senate, by a vote of 38 to 7, and the House of Representatives, by a vote of 92 to 4, approved a constitutional amendment banning same-sex marriage. On November 2, 2004, voters approved the ban as Question 711. The amendment added a ban on same-sex marriage and any "legal incidents thereof be conferred upon unmarried couples or groups", such as civil unions or domestic partnerships, to the Constitution of Oklahoma.

=== Bishop v. Smith ===
==== Background ====
On November 3, 2004, the day after Oklahoma voters overwhelmingly approved a constitutional amendment banning same-sex marriage, two lesbian couples, Mary Bishop and Sharon Baldwin, and Susan Barton and Gay Phillips, filed a challenge in the U.S. District Court for the Northern District of Oklahoma in Tulsa. The first couple had been denied a marriage license by the Tulsa County Clerk, Sally Howe Smith, while the latter couple had formed a Vermont civil union in 2001 and later married in British Columbia in 2005 while deliberations were pending. They were represented by Holladay and Chilton, an Oklahoma City law firm. Smith was represented by Tulsa County's district attorney and the Alliance Defending Freedom, a non-profit Christian advocacy organization. The case was Bishop v. Oklahoma. The defendants were the Attorney General of Oklahoma, Drew Edmondson, Governor Brad Henry, the U.S. Attorney General, John Ashcroft, and President George W. Bush. The couples sought inter alia a declaration that the Oklahoma Amendment was unconstitutional under the Due Process, Equal Protection, Full Faith and Credit and Privileges and Immunities clauses of the U.S. Constitution. They also challenged the federal Defense of Marriage Act (DOMA), passed in 1996. The state sought to dismiss, arguing that the couples lacked standing and that their suit was barred by the Eleventh Amendment.

On July 20, 2006, Judge Terence C. Kern issued a partial victory to the plaintiffs, holding that they could litigate various challenges to the state constitutional amendment; however, he reduced the scope of the case by eliminating certain legal theories from consideration. Citing Smelt v. Orange County, a California case, he ruled that the couples lacked standing to challenge DOMA as neither had entered into a legal marriage in the United States. Kern ruled that Bishop and Baldwin lacked standing to challenge the portion of DOMA that excluded same-sex marriage from being recognized by the federal government because they were not married. However, he ruled that Barton and Philips did have standing, as the couple had married in Canada and entered into a civil union in Vermont, and so determined that it would be premature to dismiss their claims. Kern found that both couples had standing to challenge the state amendment prohibiting same-sex marriage, since both were interested in being legally married in Oklahoma. State officials appealed to the Tenth Circuit Court of Appeals. The Tenth Circuit issued an unpublished decision on June 5, 2009, reversing the district court's failure to dismiss the claims against the Oklahoma officials, and dismissed the plaintiffs' claims for lack of subject-matter jurisdiction. The remaining defendants, Smith and the federal government, filed a motion to dismiss on October 13, 2009.

On February 25, 2011, prior to the court issuing a decision on the motions to dismiss, the federal government notified the court that it would cease defending the constitutionality of Section 3 of DOMA. The Bipartisan Legal Advisory Group of the U.S. House of Representatives sought to intervene to defend DOMA. On June 26, 2013, the U.S. Supreme Court ruled in United States v. Windsor that Section 3 of DOMA violated the Due Process Clause of the Fifth Amendment. That same day, the court also ruled in Hollingsworth v. Perry, allowing same-sex marriages to resume in California.

==== District court decision ====
Same-sex marriage in the United States

On January 14, 2014, Judge Kern granted summary judgement to the plaintiffs and ruled in the case, now Bishop v. United States, that Oklahoma's ban on same-sex marriage was unconstitutional under the Equal Protection Clause of the Fourteenth Amendment. He issued an order permanently enjoining enforcement of the state's same-sex marriage ban, but stayed enforcement of his judgement pending appeal, citing the U.S. Supreme Court's issuance of a stay in a nearly identical case in Utah, Kitchen v. Herbert. Kern wrote that the U.S. Supreme Court's dismissal of a similar case, Baker v. Nelson, in 1972 was not binding precedent because "there have been significant doctrinal developments in Supreme Court jurisprudence since 1972 indicating that these issues would now present a substantial question". He found that two of the plaintiffs, Barton and Phillips, lacked standing to challenge Section 2 of DOMA because the federal officials they named as defendants had no responsibility for its enforcement and the record did not show that Oklahoma officials had failed to recognize Barton and Phillips' marriage in other jurisdictions. He noted that the couple "ha[d] played an important role in the overall legal process leading to invalidation of Section 3 of DOMA" and praised them and their attorneys "for their foresight, courage, and perseverance". Kern agreed with Bishop and Baldwin that the Oklahoma constitutional amendment banning same-sex marriage violated the Equal Protection Clause. He applied rational basis review and found the state's justifications, including encouraging responsible procreation, optimal child-rearing and the impact on the institution of marriage, "inadequate". Kern ruled that the constitutional amendment was "an arbitrary, irrational exclusion of just one class of Oklahoma citizens from a governmental benefit". Of the Supreme Court's jurisprudence on the issue of discrimination based on sexual orientation and equal protection, the decision said: "The Supreme Court has not expressly reached the issue of whether state laws prohibiting same-sex marriage violate the U.S. Constitution. However, Supreme Court law now prohibits states from passing laws that are born of animosity against homosexuals, extends constitutional protection to the moral and sexual choices of homosexuals, and prohibits the federal government from treating opposite-sex marriages and same-sex marriages differently. There is no precise legal label for what has occurred in Supreme Court jurisprudence beginning with Romer in 1996 and culminating in Windsor in 2013, but this Court knows a rhetorical shift when it sees one."

Governor Mary Fallin responded to the decision by stating, "I support the right of Oklahoma's voters to govern themselves on this and other policy matters. I am disappointed in the judge's ruling and troubled that the will of the people has once again been ignored by the federal government." Attorney General Scott Pruitt called the decision "troubling" and said that the Supreme Court would have to decide the constitutionality of state bans on same-sex marriage.

==== Appeal to the Tenth Circuit Court of Appeals ====
Smith filed a notice of appeal with the Tenth Circuit Court of Appeals on January 16, and asked the court to expedite the appeal process and hear the case along with Kitchen v. Herbert. The same 3-judge panel of the Tenth Circuit that heard oral arguments in Kitchen on April 10 heard oral arguments in Bishop v. Smith on April 17. On July 18, the court upheld the district court's ruling in a 2–1 decision, concluding that Oklahoma's same-sex marriage ban violated the U.S. Constitution, though it immediately stayed its ruling pending disposition of a petition for certiorari by the U.S. Supreme Court. Judge Jerome Holmes wrote:

In upholding the district court's substantive ruling in this case, the majority concludes that Oklahoma's same-sex marriage ban—found in SQ7111—impermissibly contravenes the fundamental right to marry protected by the Due Process and Equal Protection Clauses of the Constitution.

Jeffrey L. Fisher, a law professor at Stanford University and an experienced Supreme Court litigator, joined as lead counsel for those challenging Oklahoma's denial of marriage rights to same-sex couples in August. The Supreme Court rejected Oklahoma's appeal on October 6, 2014, and the Tenth Circuit's ruling subsequently went into effect, thus legalizing same-sex marriage in Oklahoma. Governor Fallin sharply criticized the Supreme Court's action, but announced that the state would comply and begin licensing and recognizing same-sex marriages. Representative Sally Kern, who had in the past stated that homosexuality was "a greater threat to national security than terrorism", decried the court decision, "Oklahoma, or any state for that matter, should not have unelected judges who are not accountable to the people deciding what the laws will be." Scott Hamilton, executive director of a local LGBT group, said "We will be treated the same way as any other couple. And, the property that I have or that he [Hamilton's spouse] has when one of us passes will not be the same rigorous process that an inheritance might. To say that it's a big relief would be an understatement". The Oklahoma County Court Clerk, Tim Rhodes, said in the early afternoon of October 6 that his office was "bustling with activity". Mary Bishop and Sharon Baldwin were the first same-sex couple to receive a marriage license in Oklahoma, doing so at the Tulsa County Courthouse on Monday, October 6 at 1:20 p.m. Kristen and Heather Dickey were the first couple to receive a license in Cleveland County on October 6.

=== Developments after legalization ===
In May 2025, Senator Dusty Deevers and Representative Jim Olsen introduced a resolution to the Oklahoma Legislature urging the U.S. Supreme Court to overturn Obergefell. The measure was likely to encounter significant civil opposition if passed, as the majority of Oklahoma residents support the legal recognition of same-sex marriage according to polling. "For the Oklahoma legislature to choose at this moment to say that they don't value the sanctity of marriage between queer constituents is definitely concerning," said Nicole McAfee, the executive director of Freedom Oklahoma.

== Native American nations ==
=== Legal situation ===
The Indian Civil Rights Act, also known as Public Law 90–284, primarily aims to protect the rights of Native Americans but also reinforces the principle of tribal self-governance. While it does not grant sovereignty, the Act affirms the authority of tribes to govern their own legal affairs. Consequently, many tribes have enacted their own marriage and family laws. As a result, the Bishop ruling and the Supreme Court's Obergefell ruling did not automatically apply to tribal jurisdictions. Same-sex marriage is legal on the reservations of the Cheyenne and Arapaho Tribes, the Cherokee Nation, the Chickasaw Nation, the Choctaw Nation, and the Osage Nation. The Cheyenne and Arapaho Tribes were the first tribe in Oklahoma to legalize same-sex marriage. In October 2013, Jason Pickel and Darren Black Bear were issued a marriage license at the tribal courthouse in Concho. While this was the first public same-sex marriage performed on the reservation, tribal officials confirmed that two other same-sex couples had married prior to this. According to tribal law, parties who wish to marry must do so on sovereign land and one party must be a member of the tribes, but the Tribal Code does not specify the gender of the couple.

The Cherokee Nation legalized same-sex marriage on December 9, 2016. In May 2004, a lesbian couple from Owasso, Dawn McKinley and Kathy Reynolds, were issued a marriage license by a tribal court deputy clerk. The tribe quickly placed a moratorium on additional same-sex marriages. On June 14, the Tribal Council passed a law banning same-sex marriage, and the Tribal Council Attorney, Todd Hembree, filed a petition on June 16 in court to nullify the marriage license issued to McKinley and Reynolds. On August 3, 2005, the Judicial Appeals Tribunal in Tahlequah ruled that Hembree lacked standing to sue and could not show that he suffered any harm from the legal recognition of the marriage. In December 2005, the court rejected a second lawsuit challenging the validity of the marriage. In January 2006, the Cherokee Court Administrator, Lisa Fields, responsible for recording marriage licenses, filed a third lawsuit challenging the validity of the marriage. The petition remained unanswered. On December 9, 2016, the Attorney General of the Cherokee Nation, Todd Hembree, who had originally challenged the marriage of McKinley and Reynolds back in 2004, issued an opinion that the same-sex marriage ban was "contrary to both the Equal Protection and Due Process clauses of the Cherokee Constitution", (Note: The Bill of Rights of the Cherokee Constitution states: ᏣᎳᎩᎯ ᎠᏰᎵ ᎥᏝ ᏱᎬᏓᏱᎬ ᎠᏏᏴᏫ ᎬᏅᎢ ᎾᏍᎩ ᏳᎵᏍᏙᏗ ᎨᏎᏍᏗ, ᎠᎵᏍᎪᎸᎳᏅᎯ ᎨᏒ ᎠᎴ ᏧᎬᏩᎶᏗ ᎤᎲᎢ ᎬᏂ ᎢᏳᎾᏛᏁᏗ ᏗᎦᎸᏫᏍᏓᏁᏗᏱ ᎠᎮᏍᏗ ᏗᎧᎿᏩᏛᏍᏗ., translating to "The Cherokee Nation shall not deprive any person of life, liberty or property without due process of law.") legalizing same-sex marriage in the tribe: "There can be no doubt that the same-sex marriage ban rests solely upon distinctions drawn according to sexual orientation. The right to marry without the freedom to marry the person of one's choice is no right at all. The history of perpetual partnerships and marriage among Cherokees supports the conclusion that Cherokee citizens have a fundamental right not only to choose a spouse but also, with mutual consent, to join together and form a household irrespective of sexual orientation." Chad Smith, who had served as principal chief of the Cherokee in 2004, welcomed Hembree's opinion, saying, "It as adhering to past Cherokee law. But our constitution incorporates the provisions of the US Constitution, and the Supreme Court (of the United States) has since made its ruling", referencing the U.S. Supreme Court's decision in Obergefell v. Hodges, which legalized same-sex marriage nationwide in the United States. As a result, McKinley and Reynolds were the first married same-sex couple in the Cherokee Nation.

The Osage Nation held a referendum on March 20, 2017 on whether to legalize same-sex marriage on tribal land, and the measure passed with a 52% majority. The Chickasaw Code was amended on April 18, 2022 to allow marriage between any two individuals and to repeal language barring recognition of marriages between persons of the same gender. The definition of marriage now reads: "'Marriage' means a personal relation arising out of a civil contract between two individuals to which the consent of parties legally competent of contracting and of entering into it is necessary, and the [m]arriage relation shall be entered into, maintained or abrogated as provided by law." On May 23, 2023, the Constitutional Court of the Choctaw Nation ruled that same-sex couples have a constitutional right to marry and allowed a couple, Kennedy and Chelcie Barker, to adopt their 10-year-old daughter. Chief Gary Batton welcomed the ruling and said, "Based on this decision, we will review our Codes to see what changes need to be made. We offer our love and support to the family involved in this case."

Some tribal codes use gender-neutral language with regard to whom may marry, including the Comanche Nation, (Note: The Tribal Court Code of the Comanche Nation defines marriage as "a personal relation arising out of a civil contract between two legally competent persons. A marriage shall be valid only when commenced or maintained in accordance with any applicable law of the Comanche Nation, any other Indian nation or any state or country." The Clerk Court will issue a marriage license to the married couple, known in Comanche as nanakwʉ̠hʉ (pronounced [ˈnanakʷɨ̥hɨ]), if all the requirements to marry are met.) and the Kaw Nation; (Note: The Domestic Relations Code of the Kaw Nation defines marriage as "a personal relationship between two (2) persons, arising out of a civil contract to which the consent of the parties is essential".) however, it is unclear if same-sex marriage is explicitly allowed on their reservations. Some nations recognize same-sex marriages validly performed outside their reservations, including in the state of Oklahoma, notably the Absentee Shawnee Tribe of Indians, the Comanche Nation, the Iowa Tribe of Oklahoma, the Kickapoo Tribe of Oklahoma, the Pawnee Nation of Oklahoma, and the Sac and Fox Nation. In addition, the Bureau of Indian Affairs operates courts established throughout the U.S. under the Code of Federal Regulations (CFR), and "until such time as a particular Indian tribe establishes their own tribal court, the Court of Indian Offenses will act as a tribe's judicial system". As of 2023, same-sex marriages can thus be performed in these federal CFR courts for members of the Apache Tribe of Oklahoma, the Caddo Nation of Oklahoma, the Fort Sill Apache Tribe, the Kiowa Indian Tribe of Oklahoma, the Otoe–Missouria Tribe of Indians, the Wichita and Affiliated Tribes, the Eastern Shawnee Tribe of Oklahoma, the Modoc Nation, the Ottawa Tribe of Oklahoma, the Peoria Tribe of Indians of Oklahoma, and the Seneca–Cayuga Nation. Same-sex marriage is explicitly banned in the Citizen Potawatomi Nation, the Muscogee (Creek) Nation, and the Seminole Nation. A bill to legalize same-sex marriage in the Muscogee Nation was rejected on February 15, 2024.

=== Two-spirit marriages ===
Native Americans have deep-rooted marriage traditions, placing a strong emphasis on community, family and spiritual connections. While there are no records of same-sex marriages being performed in Native American cultures in the way they are commonly defined in Western legal systems, many Indigenous communities recognize identities and relationships that may be placed on the LGBT spectrum. Among these are two-spirit individuals—people who embody both masculine and feminine qualities. In some cultures, two-spirit individuals assigned male at birth wear women's clothing and engage in household and artistic work associated with the feminine sphere. Historically, this identity sometimes allowed for unions between two people of the same biological sex. In Cheyenne culture, two-spirit people are known as heʼémánéʼe (pronounced [hɛ̀ʔɛ́mánɛ́ʔɛ̥]), and traditionally filled an important role in Cheyenne society as a third gender. They were revered as warriors, directed the traditional scalp dances, were believed to be able to talk to coyotes, and were known for their skills in matchmaking, particularly for young, unmarried men who sought to impress young women. The heʼémánéʼe often served as a second wife in a married man's polygynous household. Arapaho culture has traditionally recognized two-spirit people who wore women's clothing and were regarded as "esteemed persons with special spiritual powers". They are known as hoxúx (pronounced [hɔxʊ́x], plural: hoxúxuno) in the Arapaho language. Many hoxúxuno married cisgender men without indication of polygyny.

Other nations also have distinct terms and respected roles for two-spirit people. The Ponca refer to them as míⁿquga (pronounced [mĩꜜxʼuga]). They are believed to have been "instructed by the Moon", and would sometimes take men as partners. The Quapaw use mįxóke (pronounced [mĩxóke]), the Kaw use miⁿxóge (pronounced [mĩxógɛ]), and the Osage use 𐓨𐓣𐓸𐓪𐓤𐓟 (mixóke, pronounced [miɣókə]). Osage two-spirit individuals "talk like women", wear women's clothing, but historically continued to fulfill an essentially masculine gender role, and married women. In the Chiwere language, the term is mihxóge (pronounced [mihxoꜜgɛ]). "The mihxóge were respectfully treated as a special class of religious leaders. Among the late Baxoje, Jiwére-Ñút'achi elders, the mihxóge were still regarded with awe for their spiritual connection and consecrated role in harmony with the Holy Grandfather spirits." Among all these peoples, two-spirit people have "visions of female deities or the Moon that served to endorse their identity". Sauk two-spirit individuals, known as nîshwi manetôwaki, also characterize their gender role change as "an unfortunate destiny which they cannot avoid, being supposed to be impelled to this course by a vision from the female spirit that resides in the Moon." Traditionally, they were sacred and honored annually with a dance in which only those men who had had sexual intercourse with a nîshwi manetôwaki were allowed to participate. The Lenape use nisha manëtuwàk (pronounced [ˈniʃa manəˈtuwʌk]), the Shawnee use nishwie monnitowali, the Miami use waapinkweeta, and the Potawatomi use mnedokwé (pronounced [mnədoˈkʷɛ], plural: mnedokwék). Mnedokwék "[seek] out female company" from an early age, possess the "work skills" of both sexes, "talk like women", and are regarded as "esteemed persons with special spiritual powers". The Pawnee refer to two-spirit people as kúsaat (pronounced [kʊ́sɑt]), while the Modoc, exiled to Oklahoma after the Modoc War, call them tʼwiniˑqʼ (pronounced [tʼwɪˈniːqʼ]). The tʼwiniˑqʼ wear women's clothing and "behave as women". They married cisgender men, usually took the role of a shaman (qyoɢ) and wear credited with great spirit power. The Seneca refer to two-spirit individuals as hënöjaʼjáʼgöh, and the Cayuga as deyodǫhétra꞉ge꞉. In the Mescalero-Chiricahua language, two-spirit people are known as ndé ʼisdzán (pronounced [nᵈɛ́ ʔìstsán]), and in the Plains Apache language as dèènáá čʼèèčéé (pronounced [tɛ̀ːnáː tʃʼɛ̀ːtʃɛ́ː]).

Literature about two-spirit individuals among the Cherokee, Chickasaw and Choctaw is more limited. It is likely that these societies did have a designation like two-spirit, but a lot of traditional knowledge was lost in the aftermath of colonization and the Trail of Tears. Among the Cherokee, ᎠᏎᎽ ᎤᏓᏅᏙ (asegi udando, pronounced [àse̋ːgĩ́ ùdàntṍ]) refers to people who either fall outside of men's and women's roles or who occupy both men's and women's roles. In the Choctaw language, two-spirit people are known as ohoyo holba (pronounced [ohoːjó hólba]), though the term is relatively modern. Choctaw author LeAnne Howe stated in a 2022 book, "Often they weren't just involved with other men but had many levels of relationships. They were also involved with our community in very special ways. They could be healers. They're people that protected our children because they embodied more than one thing. And what is part of Choctawan aesthetics is that we revere things that are unusual. Different. When you look at the spirit that's connected in [ohoyo holba], and when they put on that dress in olden times, they are saying 'the embodiment of many'." Some female-bodied two-spirit individuals use the term hattak holba (pronounced [hat.ták hólba]). They are hattak hoobak among the Chickasaw, aatinaani tayyihahókkìita among the Alabama, and poyvfekcv hokkolvn (pronounced [po.jəfɪ́ktʃə hok.kôːlɪn]) among the Muscogee. These modern terms usually tend to mean a gay, lesbian, or transgender person, though some two-spirit people do identify with them. In the Yuchi language, two-spirit people are referred to as wãne nõwẽ, and in Natchez as tama·l tsuna, meaning "chief of the women". It is unknown if two-spirit individuals were historically allowed to marry among these peoples.

There is little to no historical resources on whether two-spirit individuals existed among the Caddo, Kiowa, Wichita, and Wyandot peoples. A dictionary published by the Tonkawa Tribe of Indians of Oklahoma and compiled from words gathered in the 19th and 20th centuries has the entry yɑtalʼa meaning "to engage in homosexual relations", suggesting that two-spirit people or same-sex relationships may have existed in Tonkawa society.

== Demographics and marriage statistics ==
Data from the 2000 U.S. census showed that 5,763 same-sex couples were living in Oklahoma. By 2005, this had increased to 8,159 couples, likely attributed to same-sex couples' growing willingness to disclose their partnerships on government surveys. Same-sex couples lived in all counties of the state, except Cimarron, and constituted 0.7% of coupled households and 0.4% of all households in the state. Most couples lived in Oklahoma, Tulsa and Cleveland counties, but the counties with the highest percentage of same-sex couples were Roger Mills (0.70% of all county households) and Pushmataha (0.65%). Same-sex partners in Oklahoma were on average younger than opposite-sex partners, and more likely to be employed. However, the average and median household incomes of same-sex couples were lower than different-sex couples, and same-sex couples were also far less likely to own a home than opposite-sex partners. 26% of same-sex couples in Oklahoma were raising children under the age of 18, with an estimated 4,075 children living in households headed by same-sex couples in 2005.

The 2020 U.S. census showed that there were 6,294 married same-sex couple households (2,504 male couples and 3,790 female couples) and 5,327 unmarried same-sex couple households in Oklahoma.

== Public opinion ==
Public opinion for same-sex marriage in Oklahoma
Poll source	Dates administered	Sample size	Margin of error	Support	Opposition	Do not know / refused
Public Religion Research Institute	March 13 – December 2, 2024	206 adults	?	50%	46%	4%
Public Religion Research Institute	March 9 – December 7, 2023	208 adults	?	55%	41%	4%
Public Religion Research Institute	March 11 – December 14, 2022	?	?	54%	44%	2%
Public Religion Research Institute	March 8 – November 9, 2021	?	?	64%	35%	1%
Public Religion Research Institute	January 7 – December 20, 2020	529 adults	?	66%	29%	5%
Public Religion Research Institute	April 5 – December 23, 2017	794 adults	?	53%	36%	11%
Public Religion Research Institute	May 18, 2016 – January 10, 2017	1,154 adults	?	52%	40%	8%
Public Religion Research Institute	April 29, 2015 – January 7, 2016	1,038 adults	?	44%	48%	8%
Public Religion Research Institute	April 2, 2014 – January 4, 2015	737 adults	?	47%	48%	5%
SoonerPoll	October 25–29, 2014	404 likely voters	± 4.9%	29%	62%	9%
New York Times/CBS News/YouGov	September 20 – October 1, 2014	1,244 likely voters	± 3.3%	37%	51%	12%
SoonerPoll	June 4–12, 2014	393 likely voters	± 4.9%	23%	66%	11%

== See also ==
- LGBT rights in Oklahoma
- Same-sex marriage in the Tenth Circuit
- Same-sex marriage in the United States
