= United States v. Windsor =

2013 U.S. Supreme Court case

- Supreme Court of the United States

Argued March 27, 2012 Decided June 26, 2013
- Full case name: United States, Petitioner v. Edith Schlain Windsor, in Her Capacity as Executor of the Estate of Thea Clara Spyer, et al.
- Docket no.: 12-307
- Citations: 570 U.S. 744 (more) 133 S. Ct. 2675; 186 L. Ed. 2d 808, 2013 U.S. LEXIS 4921, 81 U.S.L.W. 4633
- Related cases: Gill v. OPM and Mass. v. U.S. Dept. of H.H.S (Note: Gill and Massachusetts were decided in separate opinions in the District Court by the same judge on the same day and a single opinion in the Court of Appeals, which found Section 3 unconstitutional. Three petitions for certiorari were filed (docket numbers 12–13, 12–15, and 12–97); all were dismissed the day after the Windsor decision was announced filed, with Justice Kagan recusing.); Golinski v. OPM (Note: Golinski and Pedersen are both cases in which district courts held Section 3 of DOMA unconstitutional, though instead of appealing to the Courts of Appeal, an appeal was filed directly with the Supreme Court (docket numbers 12–16 and 12-231). The Supreme Court declined the petitions the day after Windsor was announced, with Justice Kagan recusing in Golinski.); Pedersen v. OPM; Cardona v. Shinseki (Vet. App.) (Note: The Court of Appeals for Veterans Claims stayed Cardona, which challenges the constitutionality of section 3 of DOMA and certain federal regulations, pending resolution of Windsor.)
- Argument: Oral argument
- Opinion announcement: Opinion announcement

Case history
- Prior: DOMA declared unconstitutional sub. nom. Windsor v. United States, 833 F. Supp. 2d 394 (S.D.N.Y. 2012); Affirmed, 699 F.3d 169 (2d Cir. 2012); cert. granted, 568 U.S. 1066 (2012).

Questions presented
- Does the executive branch's agreement with the lower court that the act is unconstitutional deprive the Supreme Court of jurisdiction to decide the case?; Does the Bipartisan Legal Advisory Group of the House of Representatives have standing in the case?; Does the Defense of Marriage Act, which defines the term "marriage" under federal law as a "legal union between one man and one woman" deprive same-sex couples who are legally married under state laws of their Fifth Amendment rights to equal protection under federal law?

Holding
- Section 3 of the Defense of Marriage Act, which federally defined marriage as a union between one man and one woman as husband and wife, is unconstitutional under the guarantee of equal protection that is prescribed by the Due Process Clause of the Fifth Amendment to the Constitution of the United States of America. The federal government must recognize same-sex marriages that have been approved by the states as legitimate.

Court membership
- Chief Justice John Roberts Associate Justices Antonin Scalia · Anthony Kennedy; Clarence Thomas · Ruth Bader Ginsburg; Stephen Breyer · Samuel Alito; Sonia Sotomayor · Elena Kagan

Case opinions
- Majority: Kennedy, joined by Ginsburg, Breyer, Sotomayor, Kagan
- Dissent: Roberts
- Dissent: Scalia, joined by Thomas; Roberts (Part I)
- Dissent: Alito, joined by Thomas (Parts II and III)

Laws applied
- U.S. Const. Art. III, U.S. Const. amend. V; Defense of Marriage Act § 3

United States v. Windsor, 570 U.S. 744 (2013), is a landmark United States Supreme Court civil rights case concerning same-sex marriage. The Court held that Section 3 of the Defense of Marriage Act (DOMA), which denied federal recognition of same-sex marriages, was a violation of the Due Process Clause of the Fifth Amendment to the United States Constitution.

Edith Windsor and Thea Spyer, a same-sex couple residing in New York, had their marriage recognized by the state of New York in 2008; Spyer died in 2009, leaving her entire estate to Windsor. Windsor sought to claim the federal estate tax exemption for surviving spouses, but was barred from doing so by Section 3 of DOMA. Seeking a refund, Windsor sued the federal government in the U.S. District Court for the Southern District of New York. As the Department of Justice declined to defend the constitutionality of Section 3 of DOMA, the Bipartisan Legal Advisory Group (BLAG) intervened to defend the law. District Judge Barbara S. Jones ruled that Section 3 of DOMA was unconstitutional, and her ruling was affirmed by the U.S. Court of Appeals for the Second Circuit.

The Supreme Court granted certiorari in December 2012 and handed down its judgment on June 26, 2013. In the majority opinion, which was joined by four other justices, Justice Anthony Kennedy declared Section 3 of DOMA to be unconstitutional "as a deprivation of the liberty of the person protected by the Fifth Amendment". He further wrote: "The federal statute is invalid, for no legitimate purpose overcomes the purpose and effect to disparage and to injure those whom the State, by its marriage laws, sought to protect in personhood and dignity." Four justices filed dissenting opinions, including Justice Antonin Scalia, who argued that the Court had "no power under the Constitution to invalidate this democratically adopted legislation".

On the same day, the Court also issued a separate 5–4 decision in Hollingsworth v. Perry that effectively allowed same-sex marriage in California to resume. Following the decision, the Obama administration began to extend other federal rights, privileges, and benefits to married same-sex couples. Two years later, in the case of Obergefell v. Hodges (2015), the Court struck down all state bans on same-sex marriage, ruling that marriage is guaranteed to same-sex couples by both the Due Process Clause and the Equal Protection Clause.

== Background ==
Edith "Edie" Windsor (née Schlain) was born in Philadelphia on June 20, 1929, to a Russian Jewish immigrant family of modest means. During her childhood, her father lost both his candy-and-ice-cream store and his house during the Great Depression, and she at times experienced anti-Semitism. After graduating from Temple University, she married Saul Windsor. They divorced less than one year afterward, and she confided to him that she longed to be with women sexually. The divorced Edie Windsor soon moved to New York City to pursue a master's degree in mathematics at New York University; in time, she would become one of the first female senior systems programmers at IBM.

Thea Clara Spyer was born in Amsterdam on October 8, 1931, to a wealthy Jewish family that escaped the Holocaust by fleeing to the United States before the Nazi invasion of the Netherlands. Spyer enrolled at Sarah Lawrence College, but was expelled after a campus guard saw her and another woman kissing. She received a bachelor's degree from the New School for Social Research, and a master's degree and PhD in clinical psychology from City University of New York and Adelphi University, respectively. In addition to her private psychology practice in Manhattan, Spyer was an accomplished violinist. She met Windsor in 1963 at a West Village restaurant, and the two began dating after they reconnected in the Hamptons during Memorial Day weekend of 1965. Windsor had first suggested engagement in 1965. Spyer proposed to her in 1967 but presented her with a diamond brooch instead of an engagement ring, fearing that Windsor would be stigmatized at work if her colleagues knew about her relationship.

In 2007, the pair, both residents of New York, married in Toronto, Ontario, under the provisions set forth in the Canadian Civil Marriage Act, after 40 years of romantic partnership. Canada's first openly gay judge, Justice Harvey Brownstone, officiated. After Spyer's death in 2009, Windsor was required to pay $363,053 in federal estate taxes on her inheritance of her wife's estate. Had federal law recognized the validity of their marriage, Windsor would have qualified for an unlimited spousal deduction and paid no federal estate taxes.

In May 2008, New York Governor David Paterson had ordered state agencies to recognize same-sex marriages performed in other jurisdictions. Some lower-level state courts had made similar rulings, but whether the state's highest court would give such a ruling the force of law, as Windsor's claim for a refund required, remained uncertain and was disputed throughout her lawsuit.

External videos
- Interview with Roberta Kaplan on Then Comes Marriage: United States v. Windsor and the Defeat of DOMA, After Words, C-SPAN

Windsor at first asked several gay rights advocacy groups to represent her, but none would take the case. Finally, she was referred to Roberta Kaplan, a partner at the law firm of Paul, Weiss, Rifkind, Wharton & Garrison LLP, who later recalled: "When I heard her story, it took me about five seconds, maybe less, to agree to represent her". Kaplan had unsuccessfully represented the plaintiffs in a 2006 case that challenged the inability of same-sex couples to marry under New York law, Hernández v. Robles. Both Kaplan and Windsor were members of Congregation Beit Simchat Torah.

=== District Court ===
Paul, Weiss, Rifkind, Wharton & Garrison, in conjunction with the American Civil Liberties Union (ACLU), filed the case in the U.S. District Court for the Southern District of New York on behalf of Windsor as executor of Spyer's estate on November 9, 2010.

On February 23, 2011, Attorney General Eric Holder released a statement regarding two lawsuits challenging DOMA Section 3, Windsor and Pedersen v. Office of Personnel Management. He explained that the Department of Justice (DOJ) had previously defended Section 3 of DOMA in several other lawsuits in jurisdictions where precedents required the court to use the rational basis standard for reviewing laws concerning sexual orientation. Since Windsor was filed in the jurisdiction of the Second Circuit Court of Appeals, which had no such precedent, the DOJ had identified the proper standard of review in such cases as the more demanding "heightened scrutiny". Under that standard, it could no longer defend the constitutionality of DOMA Section 3. (Note: The administration continued enforcing the law until it was declared unconstitutional by the Supreme Court.)

On April 18, 2011, Paul Clement, representing the Bipartisan Legal Advisory Group of the House of Representatives (BLAG), filed a motion asking to be allowed to intervene in the suit "for the limited purpose of defending the constitutionality of Section III" of DOMA. The Department of Justice did not oppose the motion.

Windsor filed a motion for summary judgment on June 24. New York Attorney General Eric Schneiderman filed a brief supporting Windsor's claim on July 26, 2011, arguing that DOMA Section 3 could not survive the scrutiny used for classifications based on sex and constitutes "an intrusion on the power of the state to define marriage". On August 1, 2011, BLAG filed a brief opposing Windsor's motion for summary judgment on the grounds that sexual orientation is not subject to heightened scrutiny.

On June 6, 2012, Judge Barbara S. Jones ruled that a rational basis review of Section 3 of DOMA showed it to be unconstitutional, as it violated plaintiff's rights under the equal protection guarantees of the Fifth Amendment, and ordered that Windsor receive the tax refund due to her. Where BLAG had argued that the Spyer-Windsor marriage was not recognized by New York law at the time of Spyer's death – a prerequisite for Windsor's claim against the IRS – Jones cited the "informal opinion letters" of the state's governor, attorney general, and comptroller to the contrary along with several opinions in New York appellate courts. The plaintiff said afterward: "It's thrilling to have a court finally recognize how unfair it is for the government to have treated us as though we were strangers."

=== Court of Appeals ===
Despite its approval of the ruling, the Justice Department filed a notice of appeal on June 14, 2012, to facilitate BLAG's defense of the statute. BLAG filed a motion to dismiss the DOJ's Second Circuit appeal on July 19, claiming the DOJ lacks standing because it prevailed in the District Court. Meanwhile, Windsor's legal counsel filed a petition of certiorari before judgment with the Supreme Court on July 16, 2012, asking for the case to be considered without waiting for the Second Circuit's review, citing the plaintiff's age and health.

The DOJ replied to BLAG's motion to dismiss, asserting: (1) its standing as an "aggrieved party", because the District Court's stay prevents the DOJ from taking steps to cease enforcement of Section 3 of DOMA; and (2) that its participation ensures consideration of the constitutional issue if the Second Circuit or the Supreme Court determines that BLAG lacks standing.

On September 27, Chief Judge Dennis Jacobs and Judges Chester J. Straub and Christopher F. Droney heard arguments in the case. On October 18, the Second Circuit Court of Appeals upheld the lower court's ruling that Section 3 of DOMA is unconstitutional. The majority opinion stated, "It is easy to conclude that homosexuals have suffered a history of discrimination." Thus they were part of a quasi-suspect class that deserves any law restricting its rights to be subjected to intermediate scrutiny. Because DOMA could not pass that test, Judge Jacobs wrote, it is unconstitutional under the equal protection guarantees of the Fifth Amendment.

Our straightforward legal analysis sidesteps the fair point that same-sex marriage is unknown to history and tradition, but law (federal or state) is not concerned with holy matrimony. Government deals with marriage as a civil status—however fundamental—and New York has elected to extend that status to same-sex couples.

It was the first federal court of appeals decision to hold that laws that classify people based on sexual orientation should be subject to heightened scrutiny. Like the lower court, the Second Circuit held that the Spyer-Windsor marriage was valid under New York law, citing precedents on that question from several state appellate court decisions, two of which preceded Spyer's death. Where New York law is unclear, the Second Circuit must adopt a predictive approach, as it did in this case.

=== United States Supreme Court ===
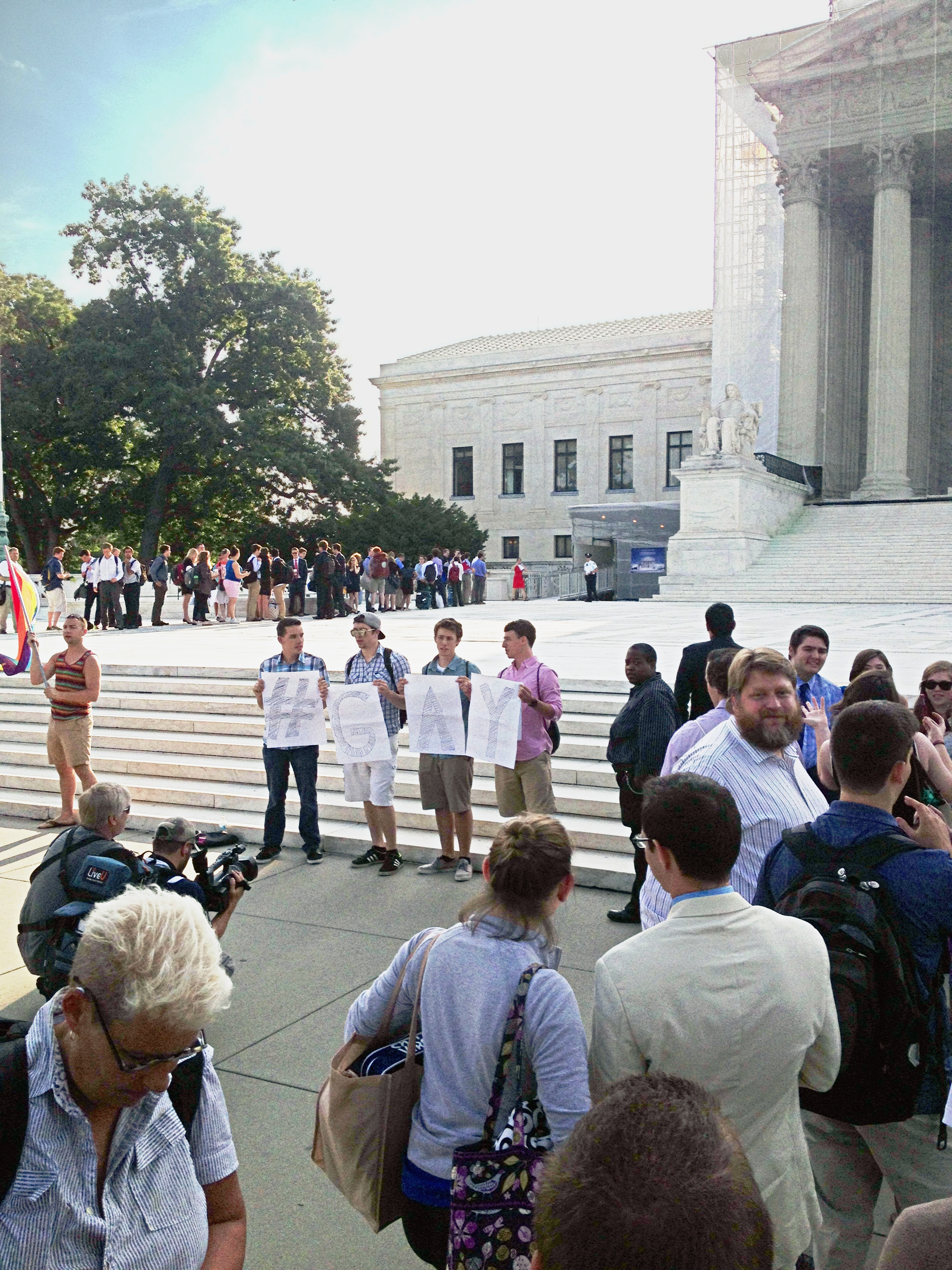
Photo of the steps of the United States Supreme Court building on the morning of June 26, 2013, hours before the court overturned the Defense of Marriage Act

On September 11, 2012, following Windsor's petition for certiorari before judgment and before the Second Circuit's ruling, the Department of Justice filed its own petition for certiorari before judgment with the Supreme Court. After the appellate ruling on October 18, the parties filed supplemental briefs. On December 7, the Supreme Court granted certiorari in the case, now United States v. Windsor, accepting the DOJ's petition.

In addition to the question presented by the DOJ – "Whether Section 3 of DOMA violates the Fifth Amendment's guarantee of equal protection" for same sex partners – the court also asked the parties to brief and argue two other questions: whether the government's agreement with the Second Circuit's decision deprived the court of a "real dispute" and therefore of jurisdiction to hear the case, and whether BLAG had standing in its own right, i.e., the legal right to independently ask for the appeal to be heard in the event that the government was not a valid petitioner. Article III of the Constitution (the Case or Controversy Clause) forbids parties that do not themselves have a real and personal ("particularized") complaint from filing a case or appeal in a federal court.

Windsor noted in a statement that when she and her partner met nearly 50 years earlier that they never dreamed their marriage would land before the Supreme Court "as an example of why gay married couples should be treated equally, and not like second-class citizens". Noting that her deceased wife would be proud, Windsor added, "The truth is, I never expected any less from my country."

On December 11, the Supreme Court appointed Vicki C. Jackson, a professor of constitutional law at Harvard Law School, as an amicus curiae to argue the two additional questions it posed. BLAG filed its own petition for certiorari, (Note: Bipartisan Legal Advisory Group of the United States House of Representatives v. Windsor, Docket No. 12-785, (U.S. Supreme Court, December 28, 2012).) in order to enable the court to rule on the constitutionality of DOMA, even if it were to decide that it lacked jurisdiction to hear the DOJ's petition. The Supreme Court heard oral arguments on March 27, 2013.

== Opinion of the Court ==
=== Majority opinion ===
In a 5–4 decision issued on June 26, 2013, the Supreme Court found Section 3 of DOMA (codified at 1 U.S.C. § 7) to be unconstitutional, "as a deprivation of the liberty of the person protected by the Fifth Amendment". The Court held that the Constitution prevented the federal government from treating state-sanctioned heterosexual marriages differently from state-sanctioned same-sex marriages, and that such differentiation "demean[ed] the couple, whose moral and sexual choices the Constitution protects". Justice Anthony Kennedy authored the majority opinion, joined by Justices Ginsburg, Breyer, Sotomayor, and Kagan. Kennedy's decision to strike down a central part of DOMA cited the principles of state autonomy, equal protection and liberty, but the constitutional basis for striking down the law was not entirely clear, as it had elements of federalism, equal protection and due process. The answer may be found in Windsor's brief, in which she argues that DOMA operates to say "that married gay couples aren't genuinely married at all but are instead 'similarly situated' to unmarried people".

The Court wrote:

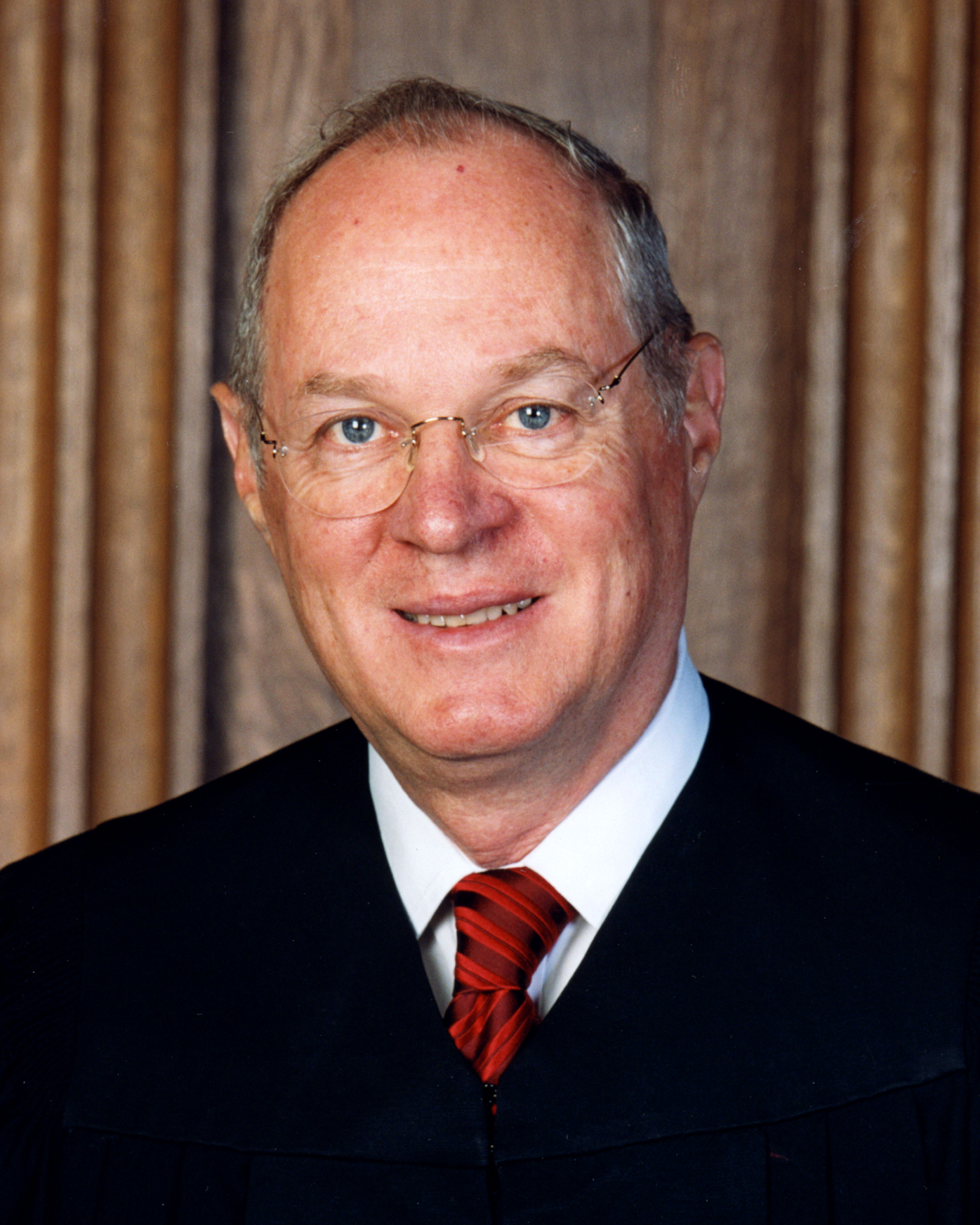
Justice Kennedy, the author of the Court's opinion

DOMA seeks to injure the very class New York seeks to protect. By doing so it violates basic due process and equal protection principles applicable to the Federal Government. See U.S. Const., Amdt. 5; Bolling v. Sharpe, 347 U.S. 497 (1954).

When New York adopted a law to permit same-sex marriage, it sought to eliminate inequality; but DOMA frustrates that objective through a system-wide enactment with no identified connection to any particular area of federal law. DOMA writes inequality into the entire United States Code. The particular case at hand concerns the estate tax, but DOMA is more than a simple determination of what should or should not be allowed as an estate tax refund. Among the over 1,000 statutes and numerous federal regulations that DOMA controls are laws pertaining to Social Security, housing, taxes, criminal sanctions, copyright, and veterans' benefits.

DOMA's principal effect is to identify a subset of state-sanctioned marriages and make them unequal. The principal purpose is to impose inequality, not for other reasons like governmental efficiency. Responsibilities, as well as rights, enhance the dignity and integrity of the person. And DOMA contrives to deprive some couples married under the laws of their State, but not other couples, of both rights and responsibilities. By creating two contradictory marriage regimes within the same State, DOMA forces same-sex couples to live as married for the purpose of state law but unmarried for the purpose of federal law, thus diminishing the stability and predictability of basic personal relations the State has found it proper to acknowledge and protect. By this dynamic DOMA undermines both the public and private significance of state-sanctioned same-sex marriages; for it tells those couples, and all the world, that their otherwise valid marriages are unworthy of federal recognition. This places same-sex couples in an unstable position of being in a second-tier marriage. The differentiation demeans the couple, whose moral and sexual choices the Constitution protects, ... and whose relationship the State has sought to dignify. And it humiliates tens of thousands of children now being raised by same-sex couples. The law in question makes it even more difficult for the children to understand the integrity and closeness of their own family and its concord with other families in their community and in their daily lives.

Under DOMA, same-sex married couples have their lives burdened, by reason of government decree, in visible and public ways. By its great reach, DOMA touches many aspects of married and family life, from the mundane to the profound. It prevents same-sex married couples from obtaining government healthcare benefits they would otherwise receive. ... It deprives them of the Bankruptcy Code's special protections for domestic-support obligations. ... It forces them to follow a complicated procedure to file their state and federal taxes jointly. ... It prohibits them from being buried together in veterans' cemeteries.

For certain married couples, DOMA's unequal effects are even more serious. The federal penal code makes it a crime to "assaul[t], kidna[p], or murde[r] ... a member of the immediate family" of "a United States official, a United States judge, [or] a Federal law enforcement officer", ... with the intent to influence or retaliate against that official. ... Although a "spouse" qualifies as a member of the officer's "immediate family", ... DOMA makes this protection inapplicable to same-sex spouses.

The liberty protected by the Fifth Amendment's Due Process Clause contains within it the prohibition against denying to any person the equal protection of the laws. While the Fifth Amendment itself withdraws from Government the power to degrade or demean in the way this law does, the equal protection guarantee of the Fourteenth Amendment makes that Fifth Amendment right all the more specific and all the better understood and preserved.

The class to which DOMA directs its restrictions and restraints are those persons who are joined in same-sex marriages made lawful by the State. DOMA singles out a class of persons deemed by a State entitled to recognition and protection to enhance their own liberty. It imposes a disability on the class by refusing to acknowledge a status the State finds to be dignified and proper. DOMA instructs all federal officials, and indeed all persons with whom same-sex couples interact, including their own children, that their marriage is less worthy than the marriages of others. The federal statute is invalid, for no legitimate purpose overcomes the purpose and effect to disparage and to injure those whom the State, by its marriage laws, sought to protect in personhood and dignity. By seeking to displace this protection and treating those persons as living in marriages less respected than others, the federal statute is in violation of the Fifth Amendment.

=== Dissents ===
Chief Justice John Roberts and Justices Antonin Scalia and Samuel Alito authored dissenting opinions, which Justice Clarence Thomas joined.

Justice Scalia's dissent, which was joined in full by Justice Thomas and in part by Chief Justice Roberts, opened:

This case is about power in several respects. It is about the power of our people to govern themselves, and the power of this Court to pronounce the law. Today's opinion aggrandizes the latter, with the predictable consequence of diminishing the former. We have no power to decide this case. And even if we did, we have no power under the Constitution to invalidate this democratically adopted legislation.

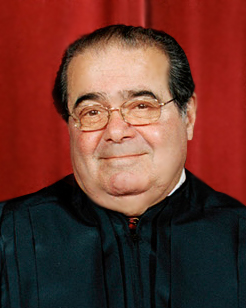
Justice Scalia, the author of one of the three dissenting opinions

He continued:

Windsor's injury was cured by the judgment in her favor. ... What the petitioner United States asks us to do in the case before us is exactly what the respondent Windsor asks us to do: not to provide relief from the judgment below but to say that that judgment was correct. And the same was true in the Court of Appeals: Neither party sought to undo the judgment for Windsor, and so that court should have dismissed the appeal (just as we should dismiss) for lack of jurisdiction.

Scalia argued that the judgment effectively characterized opponents of same-sex marriage as "enemies of the human race":

It is one thing for a society to elect change; it is another for a court of law to impose change by adjudging those who oppose it hostes humani generis, enemies of the human race.

He argued that the Court's ruling would affect state bans on same-sex marriage as well:

As far as this Court is concerned, no one should be fooled; it is just a matter of listening and waiting for the other shoe. By formally declaring anyone opposed to same-sex marriage an enemy of human decency, the majority arms well every challenger to a state law restricting marriage to its traditional definition.

Scalia concluded by saying that the Supreme Court "has cheated both sides, robbing the winners of an honest victory, and the losers of the peace that comes from a fair defeat".

The opinions of Roberts and Scalia offered different interpretations of the majority ruling. Roberts said the majority opinion was based on federalism, finding DOMA unconstitutional because the federal government was interfering with state control of marriage. He wrote: "The dominant theme of the majority opinion is that the Federal Government's intrusion into an area 'central to state domestic relations law applicable to its residents and citizens' is sufficiently 'unusual' to set off alarm bells. ... [I]ts judgment is based on federalism." Scalia was uncertain whether the majority relied upon that federalism argument or based its decision on Equal Protection grounds, writing, "if this is meant to be an equal-protection opinion, it is a confusing one".

== Responses and analysis ==
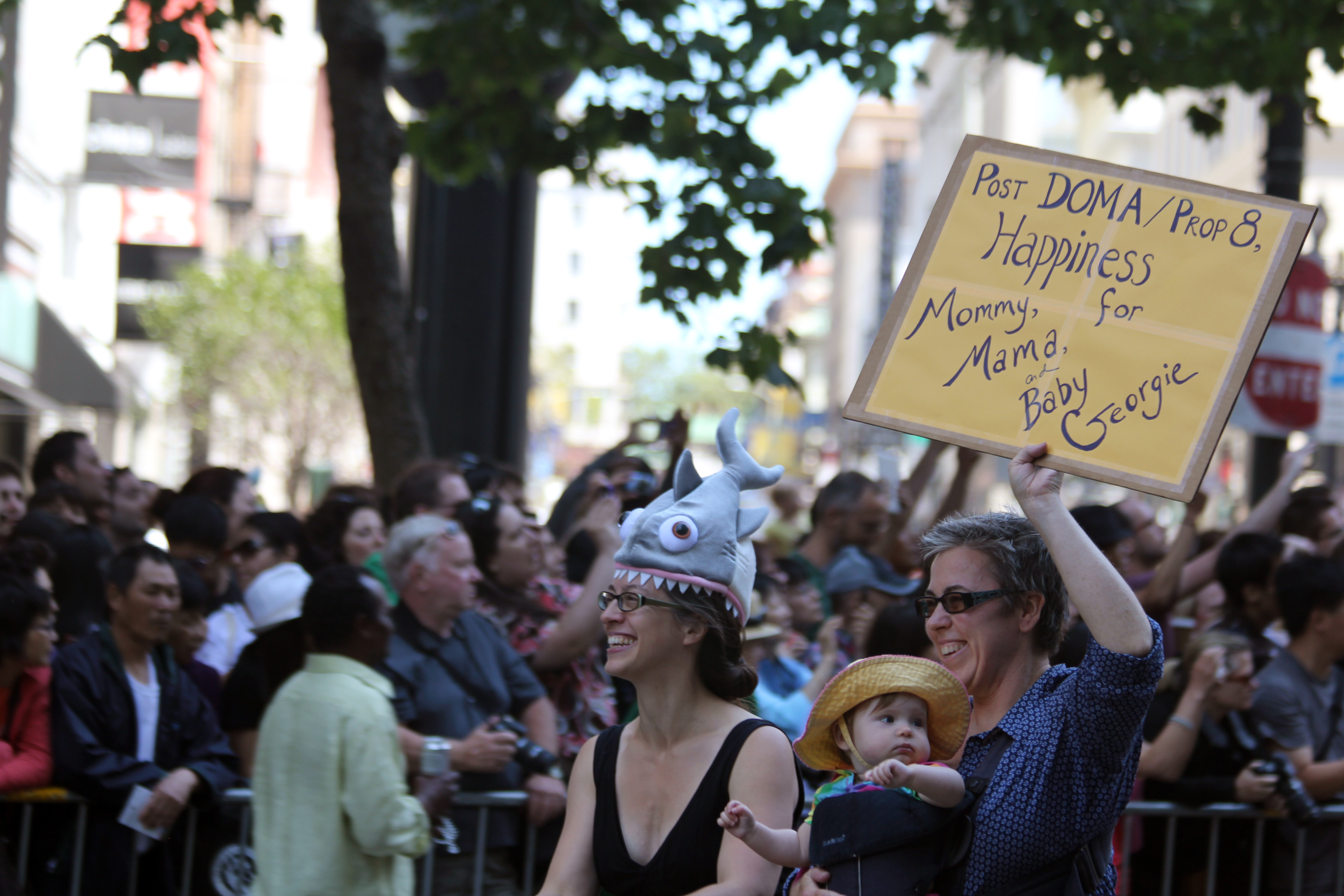
Same-sex couple celebrating legal victory at San Francisco Pride 2013

President Obama hailed the ruling as a "victory for American democracy". On the question of how the ruling would affect bans on same-sex marriage in those states that prohibit it, Obama said: "My personal belief, but I'm speaking now as a president as opposed to as a lawyer, is that if you've been married in Massachusetts and you move someplace else, you're still married, and that under federal law you should be able to obtain the benefits of any lawfully married couple."

Laurence Tribe, a professor of constitutional law at Harvard Law School, described Scalia's response and dissent as "intemperate", "extraordinary", and "at the very least, an exercise in jurisprudential cynicism". He considered that Scalia appeared to have been unable to resist "the temptation to use the occasion to insult the Court's majority, and Justice Kennedy in particular, in essentially ad hominem ... terms".

Neil Siegel, a professor of constitutional law at Duke Law School, wrote that Justice Roberts' view that the majority relied on federalism was a fallacy in that the majority did not place any weight on the federalism argument, but rather used "federalism as a waystation" to put off making a decision on the constitutionality of state laws concerning same-sex marriage.

== Impact and implementation ==
A day after the decision in Windsor, the federal judge hearing McLaughlin v. Panetta asked the parties to explain by July 18 why the logic that found DOMA's section 3 unconstitutional did not apply equally to federal regulations that control eligibility for veterans' spousal benefits, which define "spouse" as "a person of the opposite sex". On July 18, 2013, BLAG stated in a court filing that in light of Windsor, they would no longer seek to defend this case or similar statutes in court, and sought leave to withdraw from defending the case.

In the wake of the U.S. Supreme Court ruling the Obama administration and several federal executive departments and agencies such as the Office of Personnel Management began to extend federal rights, privileges and benefits to married same-sex couples by changing regulations in order to conform with the Supreme Court decision in Windsor:

- Medicaid announced in August 2013 that "all beneficiaries in private Medicare plans have access to equal coverage when it comes to care in a nursing home where their spouse lives".
- All same-sex couples who are legally married are recognized as such for federal tax purposes, even if the state where they live does not recognize their union.
- Federal employees in same-sex marriages can apply for health, dental, life, long-term care and retirement benefits.
- Legally married same-sex seniors on Medicare are eligible for equal benefits and joint placement in nursing homes.
- Death benefits are paid to survivors of a same-sex marriage by the Social Security Administration.
- The Department of Homeland Security treats same-sex spouses equally for the purposes of obtaining a green card if the spouse is a foreign national.
- On February 10, 2014, the Justice Department instructed all of its employees to give lawful same-sex marriages the same rights as heterosexual married couples in all programs it administers, whether or not the activity occurs in a jurisdiction that recognizes same-sex marriage. Included are the right to decline to testify against a spouse, spousal privileges for prison inmates, eligibility for joint bankruptcy filing, and access to such federal programs as the Sep 11 fund to compensate victims of the terrorist attacks and the compensation program for the surviving spouse of a public safety officer killed in the line of duty. The policy also affects domestic support obligations, such as alimony owed to a former same-sex spouse, as well as the exclusion of certain debts to a current or former same-sex spouse.
- The marriage can take place in a State or other Country where that ceremony was legal, and will confer eligibility to apply for lawful permanent residence.

As a result of the Windsor decision, married same-sex couples—regardless of domicile—have tax benefits (which include the previously unavailable ability to file joint tax returns with the IRS), military benefits, federal employment benefits for employees of the U.S Government and immigration benefits.

In February 2014, the Justice Department expanded recognition of same-sex marriages in federal legal matters, including bankruptcies, prison visits, survivor benefits and the legal right to refuse to testify to incriminate a spouse. Likewise in June 2014, family medical leave benefits under the Family and Medical Leave Act of 1993 were extended to married same-sex couples in all of the U.S. With respect to social security and veterans benefits, same-sex married couples who live in states where same-sex marriage is recognised are eligible for full benefits from the Veterans Affairs (VA) and the Social Security Administration (SSA). The VA and SSA can provide only limited benefits to married same-sex couples living in states where same-sex marriage isn't legal, with Congress required to amend federal law to rectify that inequity.

According to one reporter's assessment in August 2013, despite the foregoing efforts the U.S. federal agencies are not working in concert with respect to the implementation of the Windsor ruling. Instead "they are creating a patchwork of regulations affecting gay and lesbian couples – and may be raising questions about discrimination and fairness in the way that federal benefits are distributed."

In February 2015, the United States Department of Labor issued its final rule amending the definition of spouse under the FMLA in response to Windsor. The new rule is effective March 27, 2015. The revised definition of "spouse" extends FMLA leave rights and job protections to employees in a same-sex marriage or a common-law marriage entered into in a state where those statuses are legally recognized, regardless of the state in which the employee works or resides.

== Judicial interpretation ==
The ruling in Windsor led to a series of state and federal lawsuits being filed against same-sex marriage bans and affected other discrimination rulings. A year after the Windsor ruling was announced, there was at least one state or federal lawsuit against every state same-sex marriage ban.

=== State courts ===
New Jersey Supreme Court previously ruled in Lewis v. Harris that the denial of marriage benefits violate same-sex couples equal protection under the New Jersey state constitution. But following Windsor a New Jersey state judge ruled that the extension of federal benefits to married same-sex couples made New Jersey's civil unions to be lacking the equal protection.

=== Federal courts ===
In several other cases, the ambiguity in the majority decision in Windsor has produced varying interpretations in later legal decisions that address state regulation of marriage and the denial of marriage rights to same-sex couples. Courts have disputed whether Windsor relied upon federalism or equal protection and what standard of review the Supreme Court applied. Others have used it to dismiss the precedential importance of Baker v. Nelson. Within 2 years of the Windsor decision 28 district courts and 4 appeals court ruled that state level same-sex marriage bans are unconstitutional, while only two district courts and one appeals court ruled they did not violate the constitution.

In December 2013, a U.S. District Court judge ruling in Kitchen v. Herbert found that Baker no longer controlled his decision, because the rule is that "doctrinal developments" can obviate the importance of a dismissal like Baker, and given the issues before the court Windsor was "highly relevant and is therefore a significant doctrinal development". It also read Windsor as an equal protection case, writing: "The court agrees with Justice Scalia's interpretation of Windsor and finds that the important federalism concerns at issue here are nevertheless insufficient to save a state-law prohibition that denies the Plaintiffs their rights to due process and equal protection under the law."

District Court Judge Arenda Wright Allen ruling in Bostic v. Rainey on February 13, 2014, noted that Windsor discussed the deference due state laws defining marriage only to assert that "due process and equal protection guarantees must trump objections to federal intervention". She cited Justice Scalia's prediction that the reasoning of the majority in Windsor with respect to federal law motivated by a "bare ... desire to harm" would produce the same conclusion with respect to state laws.

In De Leon v. Perry, Orlando Garcia on February 26, 2014, framed the lawsuit in terms of Windsor: "Now, the lower courts must apply the Supreme Court's decision in Windsor and decide whether a state can do what the federal government cannot -– discriminate against same-sex couples." He then made the same point Judge Wright Allen had made, citing Windsor: "While Texas has the 'unquestioned authority' to regulate and define marriage, the State must nevertheless do so in a way that does not infringe on an individual's constitutional rights." (references omitted)

Some courts have agreed with Scalia that the Windsor decision lacked clarity and proceeded to interpret it with little reference to federalism, just as Scalia had predicted. When ruling Oklahoma's ban on same-sex marriage unconstitutional on January 14, 2014, in Bishop v. Oklahoma, U.S. District Judge Terence C. Kern described the decision as the culmination of a process: "There is no precise legal label for what has occurred in Supreme Court jurisprudence beginning with Romer in 1996 and culminating in Windsor in 2013, but this Court knows a rhetorical shift when it sees one". When U.S. District Judge Jone E. Jones ruled on May 20, 2014, that Pennsylvania's same-sex marriage ban was unconstitutional, he read Windsor as an equal protection decision. He cited Justice Scalia's critique of the lack of clarity in the Windsor decision, writing: "As Justice Scalia cogently remarked in his dissent, 'if [Windsor] is meant to be an equal-protection opinion, it is a confusing one. ... Windsor found DOMA unconstitutional because 'no legitimate purpose overcomes the purpose and effect to disparage and to injure.'"

Conversely, U.S. District Judge Martin Feldman, upholding Louisiana's ban on same-sex marriage on September 3, 2014, reviewed the arguments before him and wrote: "Both sides invoke the Supreme Court's decision in United States v. Windsor. ... But Windsor does little more than give both sides in this case something to hope for." In a footnote, he explained his reading of the case:

Windsor, in the context of the issues presented to this Court, is unclear (contrary to the conclusions in many recent federal court decisions). It is by its own terms, limited. Its "opinion and its holding are confined to those lawful marriages". However, Windsor also references an amorphous but alluring "evolving understanding of the meaning of equality". Hence this Court's unease that Windsor merely offer bits and pieces of hope to both sides. (citations omitted)

He quoted Chief Justice Roberts' dissent as a reason not to read Windsor as a guide for deciding the constitutionality of restrictions on same-sex marriage: "The Court does not have before it", wrote Roberts, "and the logic of its opinion does not decide the distinct question whether the States, in the exercise of their 'historic and essential authority to define the marital relation', ... may continue to utilize the traditional definition of marriage". Feldman found nothing in Windsor to require him to use heightened scrutiny, saying that "Windsor starkly avoids mention of heightened scrutiny". He called the argument that Windsor's use of the phrase "careful consideration" meant intermediate or heightened scrutiny amounted to "intellectual anarchy". He criticized several recent federal court decisions for failing to specify the appropriate standard of review they used to evaluate the constitutionality of bans on same-sex marriage. Instead he cited Windsor for its "powerful reminder" that "'The definition of marriage is the foundation of the State's broader authority to regulate the subject of domestic relations'".

=== Sexual orientation as a suspect class ===
A 3-judge panel of the Ninth Circuit Court of Appeals in SmithKline v. Abbott considered what standard of review to apply when determining whether sexual orientation can be used in selecting the members of a jury. It ruled unanimously on January 21, 2014, based on its reading of Windsor, that distinctions based on sexual orientation are subject to a standard of review higher than rational basis review and that "equal protection prohibits peremptory strikes based on sexual orientation". The Ninth Circuit wrote:

Windsor review is not rational basis review. In its words and its deed, Windsor established a level of scrutiny for classifications based on sexual orientation that is unquestionably higher than rational basis review. In other words, Windsor requires that heightened scrutiny be applied to equal protection claims involving sexual orientation.

A split remains among the second, sixth and ninth circuits of the courts of appeal regarding the level of scrutiny that applies to classifications based on sexual orientation. Although the Supreme Court had the opportunity to address the level of scrutiny in Obergefell v. Hodges, that decision focused on the fundamental right to marry.

Many scholars have theorized that the ruling in Windsor has elevated classifications on the basis of sexual orientation to be considered under a 'rational basis with bite' evaluation; and have found the analysis to be closely synonymous with how classifications of religion are reviewed. The Ninth Circuit court also observed that the majority in Windsor shifted the burden from the same-sex couple to the government when it wrote that the government has to "justify disparate treatment of the group".

== See also ==
- Meyer v. Nebraska — 1923 case defining the "liberty" protected by the Due Process clause
- Romer v. Evans — 1996 case holding that an amendment to the Colorado Constitution that prevented protected status for homosexuals or bisexuals was unconstitutional because it was not rationally related to a legitimate state interest.
- Lawrence v. Texas — 2003 case holding same-sex intimate conduct cannot be criminalized
- Hollingsworth v. Perry — 2013 case on constitutionality of California Proposition 8's constitutional ban on same-sex marriage
- Obergefell v. Hodges — 2015 case holding state same-sex marriage bans unconstitutional.
- List of United States Supreme Court cases, volume 570
- List of United States Supreme Court cases by the Roberts Court
- List of LGBTQ-related cases in the United States Supreme Court
- LGBT rights in the United States
- Respect for Marriage Act - bill in the 117th Congress repealing the Defense of Marriage Act and codifying parts of the ruling.
- Same-sex marriage in the United States
- State Marriage Defense Act
