= Kitchen v. Herbert =

American legal case

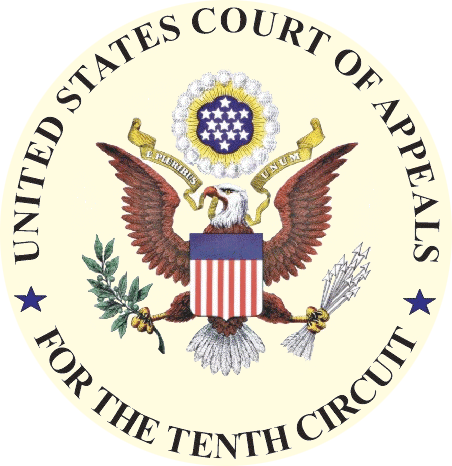
- Court of Appeals Docket: 13-4178
- Court: United States Court of Appeals for the Tenth Circuit
- Full case name: Derek Kitchen; Moudi Sbeity; Karen Archer; Kate Call; Laurie Wood; Kody Partridge, individually, Plaintiffs - Appellees, v. Gary R. Herbert, in his official capacity as Governor of Utah; Sean Reyes, in his official capacity as Attorney General of Utah, Defendants - Appellants, and Sherrie Swensen, in her official capacity as Clerk of Salt Lake County, Defendant.
- Argued: April 10, 2014
- Decided: June 25, 2014
- Citation: 755 F.3d 1193 (10th Cir. 2014)

Case history
- Prior actions: Stay of judgment ordered, 134 S.Ct. 893 (2014) Judgment for the plaintiff in district court, 961 F. Supp. 2d 1181 (D. Utah 2013). Amendment 3 of the Utah Constitution is found to violate 14th Amendment of the U.S. Constitution.
- Subsequent actions: Petition for certiorari denied, No. 14-124, 135 S. Ct. 265 (Oct. 6, 2014).

Court membership
- Judges sitting: Judges Paul Joseph Kelly, Jr., Carlos F. Lucero, Jerome Holmes

Case opinions
- Majority: Lucero, joined by Holmes
- Concur/dissent: Kelly

Keywords
- Utah Constitutional Amendment 3, Marriage, Equal Protection, Same-sex marriage, Sexual Orientation

Kitchen v. Herbert is the federal case that successfully challenged Utah's constitutional ban on marriage for same-sex couples and similar statutes. Three same-sex couples filed suit in March 2013, naming as defendants Utah Governor Gary R. Herbert, Attorney General John Swallow, and Salt Lake County Clerk Sherrie Swensen in their official capacities.

The U.S. District Court for the District of Utah found the state's ban on same-sex marriage unconstitutional in December 2013. Its order that the state cease enforcing its ban took effect immediately. In January 2014, after stays had been denied by the District Court and the Tenth Circuit, the U.S. Supreme Court granted a stay of the District Court's order pending consideration of the appeal by the Tenth Circuit Court of Appeals.

In June 2014, the United States Court of Appeals for the Tenth Circuit affirmed the decision of the district court, finding that Utah's ban on same-sex marriage was unconstitutional, but stayed their mandate pending petition to the Supreme Court.

On October 6, 2014, the Supreme Court denied the petition for review without comment and the Tenth Circuit lifted its stay, putting into effect its order ending Utah's enforcement of its same-sex marriage ban.

== Background ==
On November 2, 2004, Utah Constitutional Amendment 3, which defined marriage as a union exclusively between a man and woman passed by referendum and became part of the Utah State Constitution.

On June 26, 2013, in United States v. Windsor, the United States Supreme Court held that restricting U.S. federal interpretation of "marriage" and "spouse" to apply only to heterosexual unions was unconstitutional under the Due Process Clause of the Fifth Amendment, striking down Section 3 of the Defense of Marriage Act (DOMA).

On March 25, 2013, attorneys from the Salt Lake City law firm Magleby & Greenwood filed a lawsuit in the United States District Court for the District of Utah on behalf of three same-sex couples, including one already married in Iowa, seeking to declare Utah's prohibition on the recognition of same-sex marriages unconstitutional under the Due Process and Equal Protection clauses of the United States Constitution. The plaintiffs are Derek Kitchen and Moudi Sbeity; Laurie Wood and Kody Partridge; and Karen Archer and Kate Call. The court heard arguments on December 4. Peggy A. Tomsic argued for the plaintiffs. Phil Lott and Stan Purser, Assistant Attorneys General, represented the state.

== District court ==
=== Ruling ===
On December 20, 2013, Judge Robert J. Shelby of the U.S. District Court for Utah ruled in favor of the plaintiffs. He wrote:

Utah's prohibition on same-sex marriage conflicts with the United States Constitution's guarantees of equal protection and due process under the law. The State's current laws deny its gay and lesbian citizens their fundamental right to marry and, in so doing, demean the dignity of these same-sex couples for no rational reason. Accordingly, the court finds that these laws are unconstitutional.

==== States' rights vs. individual rights ====
The ruling stated that the US Supreme Court "has held that the Fourteenth Amendment requires that individual rights take precedence over states' rights where these two interests are in conflict," and that while Utah has the right to regulate marriage, "it must nevertheless do so in a way that does not infringe the constitutional rights of its citizens," citing Loving v. Virginia and United States v. Windsor.

The court noted that while the state electorate had voted in a popular referendum on the issue, a person's fundamental rights may not be submitted to a vote, citing W. Va. State Bd. of Educ. v. Barnette.

==== Baker v. Nelson not binding ====
Baker v. Nelson was a 1971 Minnesota Supreme Court decision that upheld the state's denial of a marriage license to a male couple. The U.S. Supreme Court dismissed the appeal in Baker "for want of a substantial federal question." Some courts have relied on this dismissal as precedent when considering challenges to same-sex marriage bans. The district court in Utah ruled that "a summary dismissal is not binding 'when doctrinal developments indicate otherwise'", citing Hicks v. Miranda (1975). It noted that the Supreme Court recognized in Romer v. Evans (Note: Romer v. Evans was a U.S. Supreme Court case striking down a state constitutional amendment adopted by a referendum in Colorado. The amendment prohibited any statutory recognition of sexual orientation.) (1996) "that the Constitution protects individuals from discrimination on the basis of sexual orientation." The district court also held that the reasoning in United States v. Windsor is "highly relevant and is therefore a significant doctrinal development."

==== Due process ====
The ruling affirmed marriage as a well-established fundamental right and liberty protected by due process under the Fourteenth Amendment. The court wrote that "the regulation of constitutionally protected decisions, such as ... whom [a person] shall marry, must be predicated on legitimate state concerns other than disagreement with the choice the individual has made", quoting Hodgson v. Minnesota. While Utah asserted that the plaintiffs were "still at liberty to marry a person of the opposite sex," the court held that for Utah to deny gays and lesbians the right to choose a same-sex spouse renders their fundamental right to marry meaningless.

The court held that requiring the ability to naturally reproduce as a qualification to marry "demeans the dignity ... of the many opposite-sex couples who are unable to reproduce or who choose not to have children. Under the State's reasoning, a post-menopausal woman or infertile man does not have a fundamental right to marry because she or he does not have the capacity to procreate." The court affirmed a "constitutionally protected right not to procreate", citing Griswold v. Connecticut. The court also held that same-sex marriage and interracial marriage, as held in Loving v. Virginia, are not new rights but "simply manifestations of one right—the right to marry—applied to people with different sexual identities." The court added that the Constitution allows different outcomes "when its principles operate on a new set of facts that were previously unknown". It quoted Lawrence v. Texas: "'[T]imes can blind us to certain truths and later generations can see that laws once thought necessary and proper in fact serve only to oppress'".

Because Utah's ban on same-sex marriage restricted a fundamental right, the court applied the test of strict scrutiny and found that Utah has not shown that the law is "narrowly tailored" to meet "a rational, much less a compelling, reason why the Plaintiffs should be denied their right to marry."

==== Equal protection ====
When a state violates equal protection by excluding a group from benefits, the court stated that it must find a rational connection to the state's legitimate interests in order to uphold the exclusion, citing Loving v. Virginia and several other cases. Utah cited its legitimate government interests to be: responsible procreation, optimal child-rearing, proceeding with caution, and preserving the traditional definition of marriage.

The court stated it "defies reason" to say that permitting same-sex couples to marry will "affect the number of opposite-sex couples who ... have children outside of marriage", citing Hollingsworth v. Perry. (Note: a similar 2010 federal district court ruling in California, now Hollingsworth v. Perry in the US Supreme Court) Regarding Utah's optimal, biological, and ideal goal of child-rearing, the court noted that "the State has presented no evidence that opposite-sex couples will base their decisions about having children on the ability of same-sex couples to marry" and quoted United States v. Windsor, holding that "[t]he law in question makes it even more difficult for the children [of same-sex couples] to understand the integrity and closeness of their own family and its concord with other families in their community and in their daily lives" and that it "also brings financial harm" to them. The court held that proceeding with caution because of "unsupported fears and speculations" about gay marriage is not a permissible basis for treating gay people differently, adding that "the process of allowing same-sex marriage is straightforward and requires no change to state tax, divorce, or inheritance laws."

Regarding the preservation of tradition, the court held that "[N]either the antiquity of a practice nor the fact of steadfast legislative and judicial adherence to it through the centuries insulates it from constitutional attack," quoting Williams v. Illinois. The court noted that the traditional view of marriage has in the past led to government enforcement of stereotypes about women and moral disapproval of interracial marriage, citing Lawrence v. Texas. That case rejected moral disapproval as a legitimate state interest, and Justice Scalia, in his dissent, wrote that the majority's decision made it impossible to avoid same-sex marriage, because "preserving the traditional institution of marriage" is just a more pleasant way to describe "moral disapproval". The district court also noted that its decision to recognize gay marriages "expands religious freedom because some ... congregations in Utah desire to perform same-sex wedding[s]" and are now able to do so, while others may continue to define marriage for themselves.

In summary, the court held that "the State was unable to articulate a specific connection between its prohibition of same-sex marriage and any of its stated legitimate interests. At most, the State asserted: 'We just simply don't know.'" The court did not find Utah's argument persuasive and ruled that the prohibition of same-sex marriage failed a rational basis review.

===== Higher levels of scrutiny =====
Citing Loving v. Virginia, the court argued for but did not feel the need to apply intermediate scrutiny on the basis of sex discrimination "because Amendment 3 fails under even the most deferential level of review." On the question of discrimination based on sexual orientation, the court was bound by Tenth Circuit precedent in Price-Cornelison v. Brooks that sexual orientation is not "a protected class, which would warrant heightened scrutiny". Regarding a test of careful consideration based on Louisville Gas & Elec. Co. v. Coleman and emphasized in United States v. Windsor, the court held that "the avowed purpose and practical effect" of Utah's Amendment 3 was "to impose a disadvantage, a separate status, and so a stigma," but the court was unsure if that qualified as "discriminations of an unusual character" that would "especially require careful consideration." The court was wary of applying that test "in the absence of more explicit guidance" from the U.S. Supreme Court.

==== Conclusion ====
In the conclusion of the ruling, the Court found Utah's arguments "almost identical" to those Virginia made against interracial marriage in 1967 in Loving v. Virginia;

Anti-miscegenation laws in Virginia and elsewhere were designed to, and did, deprive a targeted minority of the full measure of human dignity and liberty by denying them the freedom to marry the partner of their choice. Utah's Amendment 3 achieves the same result.

=== Response ===
Governor Herbert stated, "I am very disappointed an activist federal judge is attempting to override the will of the people of Utah. I am working with my legal counsel and the acting Attorney General to determine the best course to defend traditional marriage within the borders of Utah." The Church of Jesus Christ of Latter-day Saints stated, "The Church has been consistent in its support of traditional marriage while teaching that all people should be treated with respect. This ruling by a district court will work its way through the judicial process. We continue to believe that voters in Utah did the right thing by providing clear direction in the state constitution that marriage should be between a man and a woman and we are hopeful that this view will be validated by a higher court."

Because the state's lawyers had not filed a motion for a stay in district court by the time of the ruling, some of Utah's county clerks began issuing marriage licenses immediately to same-sex couples. State Senator Jim Dabakis and his partner of 27 years were among the first same-sex couples to marry in the state. Several hundred people, gay and straight, crowded outside Salt Lake City and County Building on the lawns of Washington Square on the night of December 23 to cheer and laugh and listen to band music and to speakers celebrating the state's first same-sex marriages. On December 24, the Governor ordered state agencies to comply with the ruling, and by December 26, all Utah counties were issuing marriage licenses to same-sex couples. Within a week of the ruling, Utah had issued about 900 marriage licenses to same-sex couples.

Following the ruling, the state filed both a notice of appeal with the Tenth Circuit and requests in both the District Court and the Tenth Circuit for emergency stays to stop additional marriage licenses from being issued. On December 22, the Tenth Circuit denied granting the stay motion before the district court could decide on its own stay. "[The defendants] do not seek a stay pending appeal, but rather a stay pending the district court's decision on their stay motion. But the appellate and local rules contemplate only a motion for stay pending appeal." On December 23, Judge Shelby denied a request to put the marriages on hold, allowing the state to continue to issue same-sex marriage licenses. On December 24, a two-judge panel of the Tenth Circuit Court again denied the state's request for a stay. The Utah's Attorney General's office ask the Supreme Court for a stay on December 31.

Justice Sonia Sotomayor, the Supreme Court's Circuit Justice for the Tenth Circuit, referred the stay request to the full Supreme Court and on January 6, without noting any dissents by her colleagues, she issued the stay pending final disposition of the appeal by Tenth Circuit. The stay reinstated the ban on same-sex marriage, and Utah returned to its practice of treating married same-sex couples as if unmarried. On January 10, U.S. Attorney General Eric Holder announced that the federal government would recognize the marriages of same-sex couples who married in Utah between December 20, 2013, and January 6, 2014. The Utah State Tax Commission, an independent state agency, decided that married same-sex couples are eligible to file joint state income tax returns just as when filing their federal returns.

In response to Utah's decision to put its recognition of these marriage by same-sex couples "on hold", the American Civil Liberties Union filed Evans v. Herbert on January 21 in federal court on behalf of several same-sex couples married during the 17 days Shelby's decision was in effect. The plaintiffs were successful in district court but, after a series of appeals by the state, the district court's mandate ordering Utah to recognize these marriages was stayed by the U.S. Supreme Court. After the U.S. Supreme Court refused to hear Kitchen, Utah officials asked the Tenth Circuit to dismiss its appeal in the case, ending its attempt to deny recognition to the December/January same-sex marriages. The District Court issued its order and permanent injunction in Evans v. Herbert on November 24, 2014.

== Tenth Circuit Court of Appeals ==
The Tenth Circuit ordered the appeals process to be heard on an expedited basis and set a briefing schedule to be completed by February 25. Although the Tenth Circuit initially said that requests for delay were "very strongly discouraged," on January 21 it granted a time extension requested by the state of Utah, with the new briefing schedule to be completed by March 4. In a similar Oklahoma case being appealed to the Tenth Circuit, Bishop v. Oklahoma, the appellant asked that court to hear the appeal on an expedited basis so that it could be heard together with Kitchen.

The National Center for Lesbian Rights joined the plaintiffs' legal team in January 2014. In February, lawyers who had represented the LGBT plaintiffs in the Windsor and Perry cases unsuccessfully sought to intervene. Mary Bonauto of Gay & Lesbian Advocates & Defenders coordinated the amicus briefs for the plaintiffs. The court received 27 amicus briefs for sides in both Kitchen and Bishop. A group of Republican political figures headed by former U.S. Senators Alan Simpson of Wyoming and Nancy Kassebaum of Kansas filed a brief for the plaintiffs, as did a group of 46 companies including Starbucks, Pfizer, eBay, Facebook, Google and Levi Strauss. The LDS Church, the U.S. Conference of Catholic Bishops, the Southern Baptist Convention, and the Lutheran Church–Missouri Synod filed a joint brief in support of the state's position. A group of 15 attorneys general supported the plaintiffs, while a group of ten supported the state.

The Tenth Circuit heard oral argument on April 10. On June 25, Tenth Circuit affirmed in a 2-1 decision the judgment of the district court but stayed its own mandate pending an anticipated appeal to the United States Supreme Court. The Court upheld the December 2013 decision by Judge Robert Shelby's that found Utah's Amendment 3, banning same-sex marriage, unconstitutional by stating:

We hold that the Fourteenth Amendment protects the fundamental right to marry, establish a family, raise children, and enjoy the full protection of a state's marital laws. A state may not deny the issuance of a marriage license to two persons, or refuse to recognize their marriage, based solely upon the sex of the persons in the marriage union.

Recognizing the right to marry as a fundamental right and employing the strict scrutiny standard of judicial review, the court majority concluded:

[U]nder the Due Process and Equal Protection Clauses of the United States Constitution, those who wish to marry a person of the same sex are entitled to exercise the same fundamental right as is recognized for persons who wish to marry a person of the opposite sex, and...Amendment 3 and similar statutory enactments do not withstand constitutional scrutiny.

On July 9, State Attorney General Sean Reyes' office said that it would not request an en banc hearing by the full Tenth Circuit and on August 5 filed a petition for certiorari with the Supreme Court. It presented a single question:

Whether the Fourteenth Amendment to the United States Constitution prohibits a state from defining or recognizing marriage only as the legal union between a man and a woman.

Plaintiffs' attorneys said they would support the state's request for consideration by the Supreme Court and filed a brief in support of the state's petition for certiorari on August 28, framing the question differently:

Whether a state violates the Fourteenth Amendment to the U.S. Constitution by prohibiting same-sex couples from marrying and by refusing to recognize their lawful, out-of-state marriages.

Neal Katyal, a former Justice Department official with extensive experience arguing before the Supreme Court, joined the plaintiffs' legal team in August.

The Tenth Circuit's ruling is binding precedent for all federal courts in the states in its jurisdiction: Colorado, Kansas, New Mexico, Oklahoma, Wyoming, and Utah, of which all but New Mexico banned same-sex marriage.

On October 6, 2014, the Supreme Court denied without comment the petitions for certiorari along with petitions from four other states. It allowed the ruling from the court of appeals to stand, effectively legalizing same-sex marriage in Utah. The Tenth Circuit promptly lifted its stay, immediately restraining Utah from enforcing its ban on same-sex marriage.

== Aftermath ==
The Supreme Court's resolution of Kitchen and the invalidation of Utah's Amendment 3 prompted state legislators to propose new laws, including a constitutional amendment, to reaffirm the religious rights of churches and businesses. U.S. Senator Orrin Hatch, a former member of the Senate Judiciary Committee, said: "You can't even begin to think of all the things the LGBT community can come up with to demand certain privileges and rights. So I think it's just the beginning of some very trying times for people who feel otherwise. And I think it's the beginning of trying times for folks who are gay."

== See also ==
- Same-sex marriage in the Tenth Circuit
- Same-sex marriage in Utah
- LGBT rights in Utah
- Same-sex marriage in the United States
- Bishop v. Oklahoma
