= Same-sex marriage in Montana =

Same-sex marriage has been recognized in Montana since the U.S. District Court for the District of Montana ruled the state's ban on same-sex marriage unconstitutional on November 19, 2014 in Rolando v. Fox. The previous month, the plaintiffs had asked the court to declare the ban unconstitutional following the Ninth Circuit Court of Appeals' decisions in Latta v. Otter and Sevcik v. Sandoval. District Court Judge Brian Morris ruled for the plaintiffs on November 19, legalizing same-sex marriage in Montana. The state appealed the ruling to the Ninth Circuit, but before that court could hear the case, the U.S. Supreme Court struck down all same-sex marriage bans in the United States in Obergefell v. Hodges, mooting any remaining appeals.

Montana had previously denied marriage rights to same-sex couples by statute since 1997 and in its State Constitution since 2004. Polling suggests that a majority of Montanans support the legal recognition of same-sex marriage, with a 2024 Public Religion Research Institute poll showing that 66% of respondents supported same-sex marriage.

== Legal restrictions ==
=== Statutes ===
In 1997, the Montana Legislature passed a ban on same-sex marriage and any "contractual relationship entered into for the purpose of achieving a civil relationship". Montana's statutory prohibition on same-sex marriage, though unenforceable, remains on the books and has not been explicitly repealed.

=== Constitutional amendment ===
On November 2, 2004, Montana voters approved Initiative 96, a state-initiated constitutional amendment that prohibited the recognition of same-sex marriage, as well as anything "identical or substantially similar to marital status", such as civil unions or domestic partnerships, in the state of Montana. In 2025, Representative Zooey Zephyr introduced a resolution to repeal the constitutional ban. If approved, the measure would be placed on the ballot for approval by voters. The measure was heard in committee in February and March 2025, but was tabled on March 23.

== Lawsuits ==
=== Rolando v. Fox ===
Four same-sex couples represented by the American Civil Liberties Union (ACLU) and local attorneys filed a lawsuit in federal district court in Great Falls on May 21, 2014, challenging the Montana Constitution's definition of marriage as the "union of one man and one woman" and related statutes. The plaintiffs in the suit, Rolando v. Fox, were three couples (Shauna and Nicole Goubeaux, Ben Milano and Chase Weinhandl, and Sue Hawthorne and Adel Johnson) who had married in Hawaii, Iowa, and Washington, respectively. A fourth couple, Angela and Tonya Rolando, were denied a marriage license by the Cascade County Clerk of Court. Governor Steve Bullock expressed support for the plaintiffs. Attorney General Tim Fox defended the state. On October 15, citing the recent decision of the Ninth Circuit Court of Appeals in Latta v. Otter and Sevcik v. Sandoval, which ended bans on same-sex marriage in Idaho and Nevada, the plaintiffs asked the court for summary judgment. Their brief compared the texts of Montana's ban with those of Idaho and Nevada and used the Latta decision to counter the state's arguments. U.S. District Court Judge Brian Morris ruled for the plaintiffs on November 19, 2014, and his injunction against the state's enforcement of its ban on same-sex marriage took effect immediately. He wrote:

These families want for their children what all families in Montana want. They want to provide a safe and loving home in which their children have the chance to explore the world in which they live. They want their children to have the chance to discover their place in this world. And they want their children to have the chance to fulfill their highest dreams. These families, like all of us, want their children to adventure into the world without fear of violence; to achieve all that their talent and perseverance allows without fear of discrimination; and to love themselves so that they can love others. No family wants to deprive its precious children of the chance to marry the loves of their lives. Montana no longer can deprive Plaintiffs and other same-sex couples of the chance to marry their loves.

Among the first couples to marry were Tonya and Angela Rolando, plaintiffs in Rolando, who filed marriage paperwork and were married at the Cascade County Courthouse on Thursday morning, November 20. Leslie Burgess and Serena Early were the first couple to be issued a marriage license in Missoula County. Former Supreme Court Judge James C. Nelson officiated at the wedding of Linda Gryczan and Constance Enzweiler, a couple for 31 years, who were the first to marry in Helena, the state capital, on November 20. Governor Bullock welcomed the court ruling, saying, "Today's decision ensures we are closer to fulfilling our promise of freedom, dignity, and equality for all Montanans. It is a day to celebrate our progress, while recognizing the qualities that bind us as Montanans: a desire to make a good life for ourselves and our families, while providing greater opportunities to the next generation. I have instructed my administration to quickly take all appropriate steps to ensure that we are recognizing and affording the same rights and responsibilities to legally married same-sex couples that all married Montanans have long enjoyed." Senator John Walsh said, "Today's overdue court ruling reflects our Montana values of individual freedom, fairness and equality. I believe every Montanan – our sons, daughters, friends and family – should live free of discrimination", and Senator Jon Tester also welcomed the court decision, saying, "I applaud today's ruling. It aligns our laws with our values and is a big step forward for our state. Denying same-sex couples the right to marry denies them happiness and equal protection under the law." Representative Steve Daines said he was "disappointed that an unelected federal judge ha[d] ignored Montanans' voice".

Attorney General Fox announced plans to appeal the decision to the Ninth Circuit. At the request of all parties, the Ninth Circuit suspended proceedings in the state's appeal on February 9, 2015, pending action by the Supreme Court in Obergefell v. Hodges. On June 26, 2015, the Supreme Court ruled in Obergefell that laws depriving same-sex couples of the rights of marriage violate the Due Process and Equal Protection clauses of the Fourteenth Amendment, striking down all same-sex marriage bans in the country and mooting the state's appeal to the Ninth Circuit.

=== Donaldson v. State of Montana ===
In July 2010, seven same-sex couples filed a lawsuit against the state, contending that even with the ban on same-sex marriage, the State Constitution's guarantees of privacy, dignity, and the pursuit of life's basic necessities and its guarantees of equal protection and due process require the state to offer same-sex couples the same rights and protections it offers to different-sex couples through marriage. A state district court heard oral arguments in January 2011 in the case, Donaldson v. State of Montana. The city of Bozeman backed their suit. The court ruled against the plaintiffs on April 19, 2011, and the plaintiffs, represented by the ACLU, appealed that decision to the Montana Supreme Court on August 4, arguing that the marriage amendment did not preclude providing rights other than the name "marriage" to same-sex couples. On December 17, 2012, that court in a 4–3 decision denied the plaintiffs' request to find Montana's entire "statutory scheme" unconstitutional, but invited them to renew their suit in district court by specifying the statutes they were challenging.

== Developments after legalization ==
Same-sex marriage in the United States

On February 18, 2025, Representative Bob Phalen introduced a resolution to the Montana House of Representatives urging the U.S. Supreme Court to overturn Obergefell. The measure failed to pass a Senate committee by a 4–4 vote, and was tabled 6–2 on March 3, with Republican senators Vince Ricci, Barry Usher and Sue Vinton joining Democratic senators Cora Neumann, Andrea Olsen and Laura Smith in voting to table the motion. It was likely to encounter significant civil opposition if passed, as the majority of Montana residents support the legal recognition of same-sex marriage according to polling. Indeed, multiple residents testified in committee against the measure, including a spokesperson from the Montana Coalition Against Domestic and Sexual Violence who accused lawmakers of turning the Montana Legislature into "a time machine [...] because I honestly feel like we've gone back 20 years." Representative Zooey Zephyr spoke of her marriage in testifying against the resolution, "She started reading her vows, that very sacred moment where someone who loves you dearly makes a promise in all the ways that they will love you for the rest of your life. That is the most special moment in my life I've had so far. And when the 'I do's' happened and we kissed, my 9-year old stepson said that moment was the happiest he ever was, because that was the moment I became his stepmom for real." Spokespeople from MassResistance and the Montana Family Foundation testified in support of the resolution, spending most of their testimony incorrectly stating that homosexuality was a "choice" and that same-sex couples were unable to raise children. These claims are refuted by scientific studies, which show that homosexuality is a natural and normal variation in human sexuality, that sexual orientation is not a choice, and that children of same-sex couples fare just as well as the children of opposite-sex couples.

== Native American nations ==
The Indian Civil Rights Act primarily aims to protect the rights of Native Americans but also reinforces the principle of tribal self-governance. While it does not grant sovereignty, the Act affirms the authority of tribes to govern their own legal affairs. Consequently, many tribes have enacted their own marriage and family laws. As a result, the Rolando ruling and the Supreme Court's Obergefell ruling did not automatically apply to tribal jurisdictions. The Law and Order Code (Blackfoot: ᖳᖿᖽᐦᒧᐧᒉᐡ, Akákihtsimaan) of the Blackfeet Nation specifies that state law and state jurisdiction govern marriage relations and that neither common-law marriages nor marriages performed under native customs are valid within the Blackfeet Reservation. In 2006, a traditional Blackfoot marriage ceremony was held in Seeley Lake for a two-spirit couple. As same-sex marriage is legal under state law, same-sex couples can also marry on the Blackfeet Reservation. The Crow Tribe of Montana's Law and Order Code (Crow: Baleilíiaakaxpissee) provides that marriage is a consensual relationship between "a man and a woman" arising out of a civil contract. However, the code also states that marriages legally contracted in foreign jurisdictions, including U.S. states, are recognized as valid within the Crow Indian Reservation. Likewise, the Domestic Relations Code (Cheyenne: Nevoʼêstanémaneoʼo Hoʼemanestȯtse) of the Northern Cheyenne Tribe defines marriage as "a personal relationship between a man and a woman", but states that marriages legally performed outside the reservation are valid. Similar language is found in the laws of the Assiniboine and Sioux Tribes, and the Gros Ventre and Assiniboine Tribes. The laws of the Confederated Salish and Kootenai Tribes are silent on who can marry; "The Code is silent on defining who can marry. If the Tribal Code is silent, then we rely on federal law first and then state law", said a tribal member during a meeting of the Tribal Council on December 20, 2016. Its Ordinance 103-A (Ktunaxa: ʔa·knumu¢tiⱡiⱡ 103-A; Montana Salish: Snčcx̣ʷx̣ʷepletn 103-A) does not define marriage directly, but generally refers to married spouses as "husband and wife".

Native Americans have deep-rooted marriage traditions, placing a strong emphasis on community, family and spiritual connections. While there are no records of same-sex marriages being performed in Native American cultures in the way they are commonly defined in Western legal systems, many Indigenous communities recognize identities and relationships that may be placed on the LGBT spectrum. Among these are two-spirit individuals—people who embody both masculine and feminine qualities. In some cultures, two-spirit individuals assigned male at birth wear women's clothing and engage in household and artistic work associated with the feminine sphere. Historically, this identity sometimes allowed for unions between two people of the same biological sex. The Cheyenne refer to them as heʼémánéʼe (pronounced [hɛ̀ʔɛ́mánɛ́ʔɛ̥]). Traditionally, they filled an important role as a third gender, were revered as warriors, directed the traditional scalp dances, were believed to be able to talk to coyotes, and were known for their skills in matchmaking, particularly for young, unmarried men who sought to impress young women. The heʼémánéʼe often served as a second wife in a married man's polygynous household. Among the Assiniboine, two-spirit people—known as wį́ktą (pronounced [ˈwĩktã])—would marry men. Other nations also have distinct terms and respected roles for two-spirit people. The Blackfoot use ááwowáakii (ᖳᖶᖷᖽ, pronounced [áːwowâːki]), and the Crow use batée (pronounced [bə̀ˈtêː]). The batée would marry either women or men. Osh-Tisch, a famous Crow batée, adorned women's clothing and married a woman. They also exist among the Gros Ventre, though the term used in their language is unknown. A literal translation of the term "two-spirit" would be níí3ʼa bíitéinɔh. One famous Kutenai two-spirit person was Kaúxuma Núpika, who, after leaving his White fur trader husband, returned to his people and adopted men's clothing and weapons, and took a wife. Kaúxuma was one of the "principal leaders" of the tribe and supernatural powers were attributed to him. He "is remembered among the Kutenai as a respected shamanic healer", a masculine occupation.

== Demographics and statistics ==
Data from the 2000 U.S. census showed that 1,218 same-sex couples were living in Montana. By 2005, this had increased to 1,662 couples, likely attributed to same-sex couples' growing willingness to disclose their partnerships on government surveys. Same-sex couples lived in all counties of the state, except Liberty County, and constituted 0.6% of coupled households and 0.3% of all households in the state. Most couples lived in Missoula, Yellowstone and Cascade counties, but the counties with the highest percentage of same-sex couples were Big Horn (0.82% of all county households), Garfield (0.75%) and Jefferson (0.67%). Same-sex partners in Montana were on average younger than opposite-sex partners, and more likely to be employed. However, the average and median household incomes of same-sex couples were lower than different-sex couples, and same-sex couples were also far less likely to own a home than opposite-sex partners. 35% of same-sex couples in Montana were raising children under the age of 18, with an estimated 762 children living in households headed by same-sex couples in 2005.

By November 19, 2015, one year after the ruling in Rolando, 436 same-sex couples had married in Montana. In Cascade County, containing the third-largest city in Montana, Great Falls, the "initial rush" of same-sex couples seeking marriage licenses had decreased by then; "It was busy at first [...] We [now] probably do a couple a month or a few more", said Cascade County Clerk of Court Faye McWilliams in November 2015.

The 2020 U.S. census showed that there were 1,276 married same-sex couple households (482 male couples and 794 female couples) and 1,094 unmarried same-sex couple households in Montana.

== Domestic partnerships ==
In 2004, the Montana Supreme Court ruled in Snetsinger v. Montana University System that the University of Montana's policy of denying insurance coverage to the same-sex domestic partners of its gay and lesbian employees violated the State Constitution's equal protection requirements. Montana has provided benefits to same-sex partners of state employees since 2005.

A domestic partnership bill was introduced to the Montana Legislature in 2009. It would have provided for basic rights such as hospital visitation access for one's partner and joint property ownership, but was swiftly killed in the Legislature. On April 3, 2003, Missoula County commissioners approved a domestic partnership registry for the county. It went into effect on July 1, 2003. A similar domestic partnership registry went into force in Missoula on October 1, 2013. The Missoula City Council voted to repeal the city's domestic partnership registry in October 2022, citing the legalization of same-sex marriage as a reason why "the registry was no longer needed".

== Public opinion ==
Public opinion for same-sex marriage in Montana
Poll source	Dates administered	Sample size	Margin of error	Support	Opposition	Do not know / refused
Public Religion Research Institute	February 28 – December 8, 2025	173 adults	?	66%	33%	1%
Public Religion Research Institute	March 13 – December 2, 2024	167 adults	?	66%	31%	3%
Public Religion Research Institute	March 9 – December 7, 2023	166 adults	?	63%	36%	1%
Public Religion Research Institute	March 11 – December 14, 2022	?	?	70%	29%	1%
Public Religion Research Institute	March 8 – November 9, 2021	?	?	62%	38%	<0.5%
Public Religion Research Institute	January 7 – December 20, 2020	254 adults	?	69%	30%	1%
Public Religion Research Institute	April 5 – December 23, 2017	348 adults	?	57%	37%	6%
Public Religion Research Institute	May 18, 2016 – January 10, 2017	524 adults	?	53%	36%	11%
Public Religion Research Institute	April 29, 2015 – January 7, 2016	465 adults	?	49%	43%	8%
Public Religion Research Institute	April 2, 2014 – January 4, 2015	256 adults	?	47%	43%	10%
New York Times/CBS News/YouGov	September 20 – October 1, 2014	549 likely voters	± 4.5%	45%	41%	14%
MSU Billings	October 2013	410 adults	± 5.0%	47%	43%	10%
Public Policy Polling	June 21–23, 2013	807 registered voters	± 3.4%	42%	48%	10%
Public Policy Polling	February 15–17, 2013	1,011 voters	± 3.1%	43%	49%	8%
Public Policy Polling	April 26–29, 2012	934 voters	± 3.2%	41%	48%	11%
Public Policy Polling	November 28–30, 2011	1,625 voters	± 2.4%	37%	51%	12%

== See also ==
- LGBT rights in Montana
- Civil union in the United States
- Domestic partnership in the United States
- Status of same-sex marriage
- Timeline of same-sex marriage
