= Same-sex marriage in the Northern Mariana Islands =

Same-sex marriage was legalized in the Northern Mariana Islands by the U.S. Supreme Court's landmark ruling in Obergefell v. Hodges on June 26, 2015, which struck down same-sex marriage bans nationwide. On June 29, Governor Eloy Inos issued a statement hailing the decision as "historic", and said he would work with the Attorney General and local officials to bring the U.S. territory into compliance. Attorney General Edward Manibusan issued a memorandum on June 30 confirming that the territory was bound by the court decision and said that marriage license forms would be changed to include same-sex couples.

The Northern Mariana Islands may be the jurisdiction with the highest share of same-sex marriages in the world. In FY2019, same-sex marriages accounted for 41% of all marriages performed in Saipan.

== Legal history ==
=== Background ===
There is no prohibition on same-sex marriage in the laws of the Northern Mariana Islands, nor do the statutes specify the sex of the parties to a marriage between citizens. However, other provisions appear to assume that the parties are not of the same sex. For example, in the case of a marriage involving one or more non-citizens, the statutes provide that "the male at the time of contracting the marriage be at least 18 years of age and the female at least 16 years of age." Similarly, statutes concerning divorce describe the partners to a marriage as "husband" and "wife". In December 2004, the Northern Mariana Islands House of Representatives voted 15–0 with 1 abstention in favor of a constitutional amendment banning same-sex marriage. The measure was introduced to the House by Speaker Benigno Fitial, who cited his Catholic faith as his reason for supporting the proposal. The amendment would have added the following section to the Northern Mariana Islands Commonwealth Constitution: "It is the public policy of the Commonwealth to protect the unique relationship of marriage and that only the union of one man and one woman shall be valid or recognized as a marriage in the CNMI and the legislature may enact no law inconsistent with the public policy on marriage." The amendment failed to pass the Senate.

The Ninth Circuit Court of Appeals' decisions in Sevcik v. Sandoval and Latta v. Otter, which struck down same-sex marriage bans in Nevada and Idaho as unconstitutional, are binding precedent on federal courts in the Northern Mariana Islands. However, from October 2014, when this precedent took effect, until June 2015, when the Supreme Court invalidated all bans in Obergefell v. Hodges, no same-sex couple filed suit in the District Court for the Northern Mariana Islands to force the issue.

=== Supreme Court ruling ===
Recognition of same-sex relationships in Oceania Marriage Marriages performed elsewhere are recognized (American Samoa) No recognition of same-sex couples Constitution limits marriage to opposite-sex couples (Palau, Tuvalu) Same-sex sexual activity illegal, but criminalisation not enforced Same-sex sexual activity illegal (Country names will appear with mouse-overs when map is viewed at full size. Encircling lines are the exclusive economic zones of each state.)

On June 26, 2015, the U.S. Supreme Court ruled in Obergefell v. Hodges that laws depriving same-sex couples of the rights of marriage violate the Due Process and Equal Protection clauses of the Fourteenth Amendment to the United States Constitution. The ruling legalized same-sex marriage nationwide in the United States, including in the Northern Mariana Islands. On June 29, Governor Eloy Inos hailed the decision as "historic" in a statement and said he would work with the Attorney General and local officials to bring the U.S. territory into compliance. He issued the following statement: "The union between two individuals regardless of gender, race, ethnicity, etc. through the ceremony of marriage is a celebration of unconditional love and enduring commitment. While we acknowledge this historical ruling, we must remember that what is most important in our community is that we express love, compassion, and tolerance toward one another. [...] Same sex common law unions have been in existence in our culture even before this ruling. In our small community, we either have family, friends, or know of people who are gay or lesbian couples." Attorney General Edward Manibusan issued a memorandum on June 30 confirming that the territory was bound by the court decision and updating the marriage application forms to include same-sex couples.

Statutes have not being explicitly amended to incorporate the Obergefell ruling. However, in 2018, the Northern Mariana Islands Commonwealth Legislature passed Public Law 20-53 (Chamorro: Lai Publiku 20-53; Carolinian: Alléghul Toulap 20-53), which amended territory law to state that marriage licenses may be issued between "two persons":

The Governor or a mayor is authorized to grant a license for marriage between two persons. [8 CMC § 1202(a)(1)]

== Marriage statistics ==
Since the legalization of same-sex marriage in June 2015, the Northern Mariana Islands has become a popular marriage destination for foreign same-sex couples, especially among Chinese tourists. Statutes permit the Governor of the Northern Mariana Islands and local mayors to issue marriage licenses to "two non-citizens or between a non-citizen and a citizen". 2019 estimates showed that tourists made up 99% of same-sex marriages in Saipan. The Public Law 20-53, enacted in April 2018, introduced higher marriage license fees for non-residents. Saipan Mayor David M. Apatang conducted the first same-sex marriage in the Northern Mariana Islands on July 22, 2015, saying it was his "legal obligation" to perform the union. He said he was following the June 30 memorandum issued by Attorney General Manibusan. An updated version of the Northern Mariana Islands' marriage form provided by the Attorney General's office was used for the couple. By late August 2015, Apatang had performed three same-sex marriages. The first same-sex marriage in Tinian was performed on June 24, 2017.

According to the Saipan Mayor's Office, 12 same-sex marriages were performed in 2015, 30 in 2016, and 88 in 2017, with most being between lesbian couples. The office conducted 96 same-sex marriages from January to September 2018. Of note, same-sex marriages accounted for the majority of marriages conducted by the office in the first few months of 2018. 256 same-sex marriages were performed in FY2019 (1 October 2018 to 30 September 2019). This accounted for 41% of all marriages. Far less marriages were performed in FY2020 and FY2021 due to COVID-19 pandemic guidelines. 118 same-sex marriages were performed in Saipan in 2023 (71 for female couples and 47 for male couples), of which 105 were between non-residents.

== See also ==
- LGBT rights in the Northern Mariana Islands
- Same-sex marriage in Guam
- Same-sex marriage in the United States
- Recognition of same-sex unions in Oceania
