= Same-sex marriage in Guam =

Same-sex marriage has been legal in Guam since June 9, 2015, following a ruling from the District Court of Guam on June 5 that the territory's prohibition of same-sex marriage was unconstitutional. The court case, Aguero v. Calvo, had been filed in April 2015 following the Ninth Circuit Court of Appeals' decisions in Latta v. Otter and Sevcik v. Sandoval that Idaho's and Nevada's denial of marriage rights to same-sex couples was unconstitutional. Guam was the first territory of the United States to recognize same-sex marriage.

On August 12, 2015, the Guam Legislature passed the Guam Marriage Equality Act of 2015 by a vote of 13–2. The law came into effect on August 27, officially incorporating the federal court ruling into statutory law. Previously, Guam had denied marriage rights to same-sex couples by statute since 1994.

== Legal history ==
=== Restrictions ===
The Guam Organic Act of 1950, an Act of the United States Congress, does not address the question of marriage. Since August 2015, Guam's marriage statutes have recognised the marriages of same-sex couples. Previously, a 1994 law specifying the responsibilities of the Guam Department of Public Health and Social Services defined marriage as the "union of a man and a woman". That law, which contained a prohibition on marriage "between uncles and nieces or aunts and nephews", arguably showed Guam anticipated recognising only opposite-sex marriages. The law stipulated that parties "must declare in the presence of the person solemnizing the marriage that they take each other as husband and wife." With respect to marriages from other jurisdictions, the statutes stated:

All marriages contracted outside of the territory of Guam, which would be valid by the laws of the country in which the same were contracted, are valid in the territory of Guam.

The 1994 law, which set standards and procedures for the Department of Public Health and Social Services, included this definition:

Marriage means the legal union of persons of opposite sex. The legality of the union may be established by civil or religious regulations, as recognized by the laws of Guam.

Federal courts in Guam are subject to the precedents set in 2014 by the decisions of the Ninth Circuit Court of Appeals in Latta v. Otter and Sevcik v. Sandoval, which found Idaho's and Nevada's denial of marriage rights to same-sex couples unconstitutional. The District Court of Guam noted this precedent in its June 2015 ruling permanently enjoining Guam officials from enforcing the 1994 law "or any other laws or regulations to the extent they prohibit otherwise qualified same-sex couples from marrying in Guam". Following the district court ruling and the U.S Supreme Court's ruling in Obergefell v. Hodges, Guam legislators on August 12, passed the Guam Marriage Equality Act of 2015, which created legal equality in civil marriage. The bill passed by a margin of 13–2 in the Legislature of Guam. It took effect on August 27, 2015.

August 12, 2015 vote in the Legislature
Party	Voted for	Voted against	Abstained
Democratic Party	7: Thomas Ada; Nerissa Bretania Underwood; Benjamin Cruz; Tina Rose Muña Barnes; Rory Respicio; Michael San Nicolas; Judith Won Pat	2: Frank Aguon; Dennis Rodriguez	–
Republican Party	6: Vicente Anthony Ada; Frank Blas Jr.; James Espaldon; Brant McCreadie; Thomas Morrison; Mary Camacho Torres	–	–
Total	13	2	0
Total	86.7%	13.3%	0.0%

The law amended the definition of marriage in Guam law to the following:

Marriage means the legal union between two persons without regard to gender. The legality of the union may be established by civil or religious regulations, as recognized by the laws of Guam. [10 Guam Code § 3207(h)]

=== Attempts at passing civil unions ===
Recognition of same-sex relationships in Oceania Marriage Marriages performed elsewhere are recognized (American Samoa) No recognition of same-sex couples Constitution limits marriage to opposite-sex couples (Palau, Tuvalu) Same-sex sexual activity illegal, but criminalisation not enforced Same-sex sexual activity illegal (Country names will appear with mouse-overs when map is viewed at full size. Encircling lines are the exclusive economic zones of each state.)

Legislation to permit civil unions (Chamorro: unikon sibit, pronounced [uniˈkon siˈbit]) was first discussed in the mid 2000s. After Vermont enacted same-sex marriage legislation in 2009, the 27th Guam Youth Congress, an advisory body which submits legislation to committees of the Legislature of Guam, forwarded a bill to legalize civil unions, with the bill being supported by Speaker Derick Baza Hills. A similar measure had failed in the 25th Guam Youth Congress by just one vote. Citing recent court rulings, such as the unanimous decision overturning the ban on same-sex marriage in Iowa in Varnum v. Brien, Hills later commented that the courts would be essential to make sure we "allow for equal rights". While same-sex marriage was then not being considered in Guam, Hills made sure to point out that "We do have advocates in the Legislature [who support same-sex civil unions]... I do feel and know that there are senators comfortable supporting this legislation". Hills called on the Legislature to introduce legislation to create such unions, though the extent of rights to be granted was unknown.

On June 3, 2009, Vice-Speaker Benjamin Cruz introduced Bill No. 138, which would have established same-sex civil unions providing all of the rights and benefits of civil marriage. The bill was heavily condemned by the Catholic Church, and it did not get sufficient votes to make it to the session floor. Due to opposition to the bill within the religious community, Bill No. 185 and Bill No. 212 were introduced by proponents of same-sex unions should the civil union bill fail to pass. Bill No. 212 mirrored the bill passed in Hawaii that provided significantly limited rights. It would have established a "Designated Beneficiary Agreement", and unlike civil unions, would have been open to both same-sex and opposite-sex couples. Both bills also failed to pass.

=== Lawsuits ===
On April 8, 2015, a lesbian couple were refused a marriage license by the Department of Public Health and Social Services. The next day, the editorial board of the Pacific Daily News endorsed the legalization of same-sex marriage in Guam. Attorney General Elizabeth Barrett-Anderson endorsed the Department's refusal, but when later asked if Guam law violated the Fourteenth Amendment said: "Good question. I can't comment". The couple filed a lawsuit challenging the territory's refusal to grant them a marriage license, Aguero v. Calvo, in the District Court of Guam on April 13.

On April 15, 2015, Attorney General Barrett-Anderson ordered Guam officials to begin licensing same-sex marriages. Barrett-Anderson issued a directive to the Department of Public Health and Social Services to immediately begin processing marriage applications from same-sex couples, instructing that same-sex applicants be treated "with dignity and equality under the Constitution". She cited the decision of the Ninth Circuit in Latta v. Otter, which is controlling precedent on federal courts in Guam. However, Governor Eddie Calvo responded the next day by questioning the legal basis for Barrett-Anderson's memorandum. He suggested same-sex marriage licensing should wait until the U.S. Supreme Court ruled on a case before it. Governor Calvo said the question of marriage should be addressed by the Legislature or voters of Guam, and the acting head of the Department of Public Health and Social Services said his office would not accept applications from same-sex couples seeking marriage licenses for the time being.

On May 8, the Chief Judge of the District Court of Guam, Frances Tydingco-Gatewood, denied the defendants' request to delay proceedings pending action by the U.S. Supreme Court in related cases. She set a briefing schedule and scheduled a hearing for June 5. On June 5, Judge Tydingco-Gatewood issued a ruling striking down Guam's statutory ban on same-sex marriage. The ruling was issued immediately after the court proceedings and went into effect on Tuesday, June 9. Same-sex marriages became performable and recognized in the U.S. territory from that date. Attorneys representing the government said in a May 18 court filing that "should a court strike current Guam law, they would respect and follow such a decision". On June 9, 2015, Loretta Pangelinan, 28, and Kathleen Aguero, 29, plaintiffs in Aguero, were the first of several same-sex couples to receive a marriage license in the territory's capital, Hagåtña. The first couple to marry was Deasia Johnson of Killeen, Texas and Nikki Dismuke of New Orleans, Louisiana, who were married in a brief ceremony in the office of Public Health Director James Gillan on the morning on June 9, the day the island became the United States' first overseas territory to recognize same-sex marriage.

== Marriage statistics ==
139 same-sex couples married on the island between June 2015 and October 2016. 67 of these couples were Guam residents, while 12 were from the Philippines, 9 from Taiwan, 6 from the state of California and 5 each from Hong Kong and the Northern Mariana Islands. There were also couples from Honduras, Italy, Malaysia, Russia, South Korea and the Netherlands. 363 same-sex marriages had taken place in Guam by March 2019.

In October 2016, the Guam Visitors Bureau began marketing Guam as a same-sex marriage destination in hopes of attracting same-sex couples seeking to marry to the island.

== Public opinion ==
In a 2009 poll conducted by the Pacific Daily News, 26% of Guam residents supported same-sex marriage, 27% supported same-sex domestic partnerships or civil unions, and 29% believed there should be no legal recognition of same-sex relationships in Guam. An April 2015 poll conducted by students from the University of Guam found a 55% majority in favor of same-sex marriage, while 29% were opposed and 16% were undecided.

== See also ==
- LGBT rights in Guam
- Politics of Guam
- Recognition of same-sex unions in Oceania
- Same-sex marriage in the United States
