= LGBTQ people in the United States =

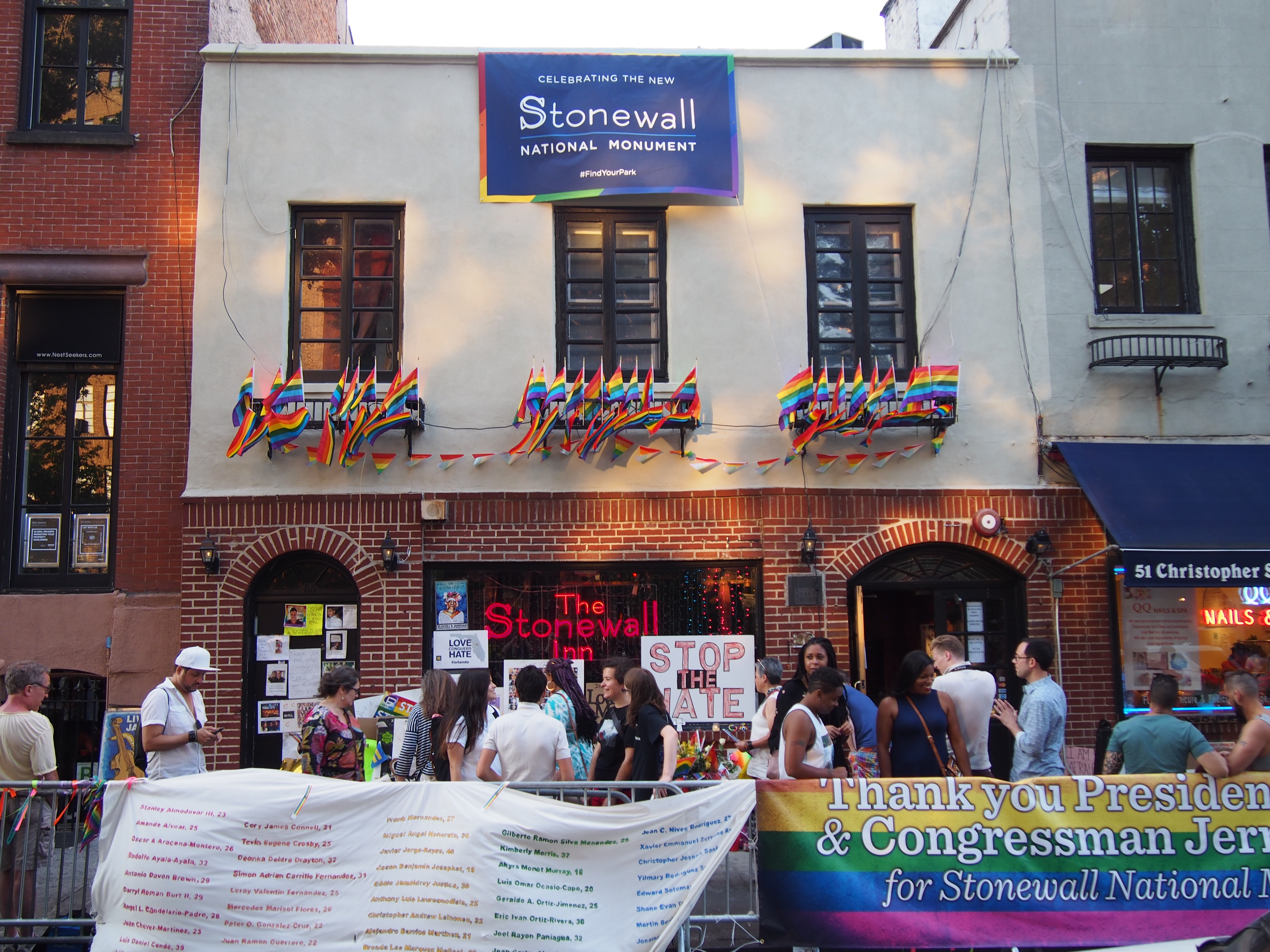
Stonewall Inn, New York City, pride 2016

United States pride flag

In the United States, lesbian, gay, bisexual, transgender, and queer (LGBTQ) people have a long history, including subcultures and advocacy battles for social and religious acceptance and legal rights.

Though the first national gay organization was formed in 1950, the 1969 Stonewall riots in New York City are often cited as the beginning of the modern gay civil rights era. The AIDS crisis in the 1980s was a large influence on gay communities and activism. In the late 20th century, social acceptance began to increase, and legal rights followed.

Military policy was changed in 2011, allowing LGBTQ people to serve openly. Social conservatives briefly had success outlawing same-sex marriage at the state level in the 2000s, but the Supreme Court legalized same-sex marriage nationwide in 2015.

== Demographics ==
In 2024, Gallup found that 7.6% of U.S. adults identified as LGBTQ or another sexual orientation besides heterosexual. Broken down by age group, this shows up at 22.3% among Gen Zers (born 1997–2012), 9.8% among Millennials (born 1981–1996), 4.5% among Generation Xers (born 1965–1980), 2.3% among Baby boomers (born 1946–1964), and 1.1% for members of the Silent Generation (born 1945 or earlier).

== History ==
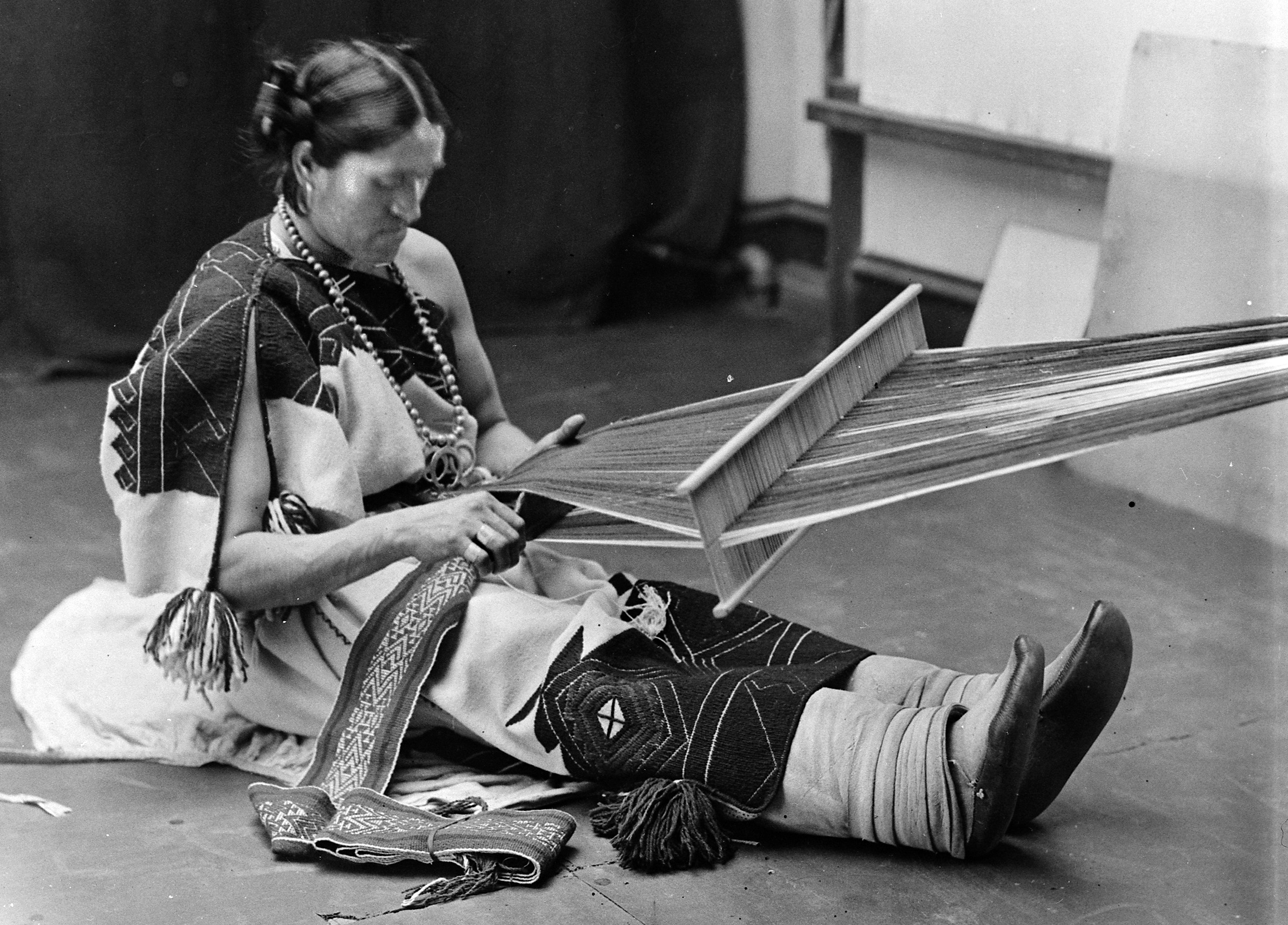
We'wha was a Zuni Native American lhamana from New Mexico. Lhamana are biologically male people who take on the social and ceremonial roles usually performed by women in their culture

There are varying accounts of the place LGBTQ people occupied in pre-Columbian era Native American tribes. In modern parlance, the term Two-Spirit is often used to describe Native American LGBTQ people. There were (and are) hundreds of different tribes across the US, each with its own culture, thus acknowledgement and acceptance of and social roles for LGBTQ people varied across tribes. In the reservation era, Christian missionaries and European government agencies denounced homosexuality and gender variance, forcing LGBTQ people to adopt social roles and dress considered appropriate, such as making males cut their hair and making females wear dresses. Though the violence and intimidation enacted by the church and government were disproportionately directed at Native Americans, both Native and non-Native LGBTQ people often lived in hiding to avoid being incarcerated or killed because homosexuality was a criminal offense.

The first person known to describe himself as a drag queen was William Dorsey Swann, born enslaved in Hancock, Maryland. Swann was the first American on record who pursued legal and political action to defend the LGBTQ community's right to assemble. During the 1880s and 1890s, Swann organized a series of drag balls in Washington, D.C.. Swann was arrested in police raids numerous times, including in the first documented case of arrests for female impersonation in the United States, on April 12, 1888.

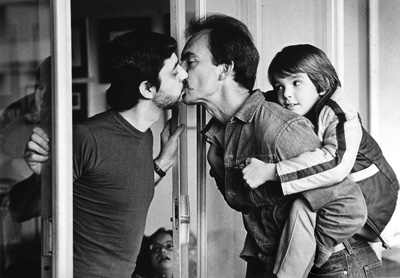
Story on gay fathers published in May 1983 Life Magazine

LGBTQ acceptance had shown slow improvement in the 19th century and first half of the 20th century. The first documented gay rights organization in American, the Society for Human Rights, was founded in Chicago in 1924 by Henry Gerber, a German-American activist inspired by the progress made by Magnus Hirschfeld in Berlin. The organization published two issues of a magazine, Friendship and Freedom, but was short-lived due to police harassment and legal challenges.

In the 1950s, there was both greater organization within the LGBTQ community and greater government repression, known as the Lavender Scare. In 1950, the first national gay organization was founded in Los Angeles. The Mattachine Society was a leader in the homophile movement of the 1950s and '60s. The organization rapidly lost popularity in the late '60s before ultimately filing for bankruptcy in 1976. The Mattachine formally opposed the Stonewall riots and put up a sign pleading for peace, which created tension between members who advocated for assimilationist versus radical tactics. The radicals broke off to form the Gay Liberation Front, while Mattachine membership continued to decline.

The Stonewall riots were a series of spontaneous, violent demonstrations against a police raid that occurred across five nights in June – early July 1969, at the Stonewall Inn, in the Greenwich Village neighborhood of New York City. Although the demonstrations were not the first time American homosexuals fought back against government-sponsored persecution of sexual minorities, the Stonewall riots marked a new beginning for the gay rights movement and gay liberation in the United States and around the world. The first gay pride parade, then called Christoper Street Liberation Day, was held on June 28, 1970, the anniversary of the first night of the riots.

The riots ushered in a new era of open advocacy for gay rights. The American Psychiatric Association removed homosexuality from the DSM and more states began decriminalizing sodomy. In the 1970s, activists lobbied for a number of anti-discrimination bills in their local communities. After an initial wave of success, the late '70s saw a backlash led by Anita Bryant's Save Our Children campaign, wherein a number of recently-passed bills were repealed. This decade saw the election of the first politicians to run as openly gay candidates, including Kathy Kozachenko, Elaine Noble, and Harvey Milk. In addition, while the early days of the gay movement were dominated by white gay males, the movement became more diverse in the 1970s with the formation of groups like Lavender Menace and Street Transvestite Action Revolutionaries.

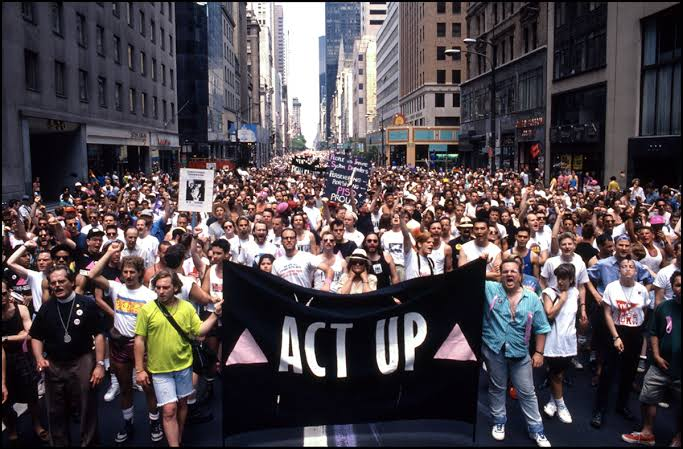
Members of ACT UP NY protest in Manhattan.

There were more rapid changes with HIV/AIDS crisis activism in the 1980s. The disease disproportionately affected gay men, leading to mass mortality within the community. Among gay men who were between the ages of 25–44 at the start of the epidemic, 1 in 10 had died of AIDS-related complications by 1995. Among the most visible groups of this time period was the AIDS Coalition to Unleash Power (ACT UP), founded by author and activist Larry Kramer in 1985. The group lobbied for more research, funding, and treatment options for HIV/AIDS due to perceived apathy from the Reagan administration. A number of writers, artists and entertainers publicly acknowledged their homosexuality.

In the 1990s, the popular media began including gay characters. Ellen was cancelled in 1998, shortly after both the main character and her namesake star came out as a lesbian, making the series the first to have a gay main character. That same year, Will & Grace premiered. The cast and crew feared that it would be cancelled as well, but the series was well-received and went on for an initial eight-season run. The show is widely seen as having created the opportunity for future series with gay leads, and for helping to increase public acceptance of the LGBTQ community.

The socially conservative Don't Ask Don't Tell policy (DADT) and the Defense of Marriage Act (DOMA) were two of the highest-profile policy changes affecting LGBTQ people in the 1990s. At the time, DADT was seen as a compromise between the traditionally conservative military, which had banned homosexuals from service from its inception, and the Democratic Party, which increasingly favored ending the ban. DADT barred military officers not inquire into soldiers' sexual orientation, while also prohibiting soldiers from coming out. DOMA was passed in response to a number of states passing laws protecting domestic partnerships for same-sex couples, as well as speculation that Hawaiʻi might legalize gay marriage. Under DOMA, neither the federal government nor any other state was required to recognize a same-sex marriage performed in another state, excepting gay marriages from the Full Faith and Credit Clause. DADT was dropped in 2011, and DOMA was ruled unconstitutional in 2013.

Anti-sodomy laws were ruled unconstitutional in 2003, making it legal throughout the nation for consenting adults to have sex with a person of the same gender. Throughout the 2000s and 2010s, states began legalizing same-sex marriage. By 2015, 37 states had voted to legalize same-sex marriage. Obergefell v. Hodges ruled the remaining laws restricting marriage to heterosexual couples unconstitutional, effectively legalizing same-sex marriage nationwide.

Official church positions on LGBTQ issues have been slower to change and mostly among mainstream Protestant denominations.

== Communities ==
=== The Mattachine Society ===
In 1950, a gay community in Los Angeles with communist ideals founded the movement "The Mattachine Society". It began in 1940 when Harry Hay proposed the term homophile, with the hope that de-emphasizing the sexual aspect of homosexuality would increase societal acceptance. The Mattachine Society originated under the name "International Bachelors Fraternal Orders for Peace and Social Dignity." The new name was founded by the influence of European masked performers. The main goal of this movement was to oppose discrimination and to create a strong identity within the gay community. The goals started to focus on assimilation instead of advocacy, and the group started to decline from a national organization to smaller chapters in the 1950s.

While never officially affiliated with the Mattachine Society, One Magazine is thought to have been founded based on a discussion at a Mattachine Meeting.

=== The Lesbian Movement ===
In 1955 in San Francisco, Del Martin and Phyllis Lyon founded Daughters of Bilitis, part of the homophile movement, to create lesbian community. The organization was intended to be a safe space for lesbians and to advocate. It was influenced by The Mattachine Society and other groups.

In the early 1970s, lesbian activists created their own communities and institutions including self defense schools. Many of their activities were separate from the broader feminist movement and from the gay men's movement. In the late 1970s, the lesbian movement dwindled due to the economic recession, and it generally integrated with the broader gay movement.

=== Street Transvestite Action Revolutionaries ===
Street Transvestite Action Revolutionaries (STAR), founded in 1970 by Sylvia Rivera and Marsha P. Johnson, provided housing and support to homeless LGBT youth in Lower Manhattan. Rivera and Johnson funded the organization largely through sex work, becoming known as the "mothers" of the household. Initially focused on housing, STAR later advocated for trans recognition in the gay liberation movement, leaving a legacy of resilience and advocacy. Rivera briefly revived STAR in 2001 as Street Transgender Action Revolutionaries, continuing the fight for transgender rights until her death in 2002.

== Rights ==
LGBTQ rights in the US have evolved over time and vary on a state-by-state basis. Sexual acts between persons of the same sex have been legal nationwide in the US since 2003, pursuant to the U.S. Supreme Court ruling in Lawrence v. Texas.

Anti-discrimination laws vary by state. Same-sex marriage is legal in every state, pursuant to the U.S. Supreme Court ruling in Obergefell v. Hodges. Hate crimes based on sexual orientation or gender identity are also punishable by federal law under the Matthew Shepard and James Byrd, Jr. Hate Crimes Prevention Act of 2009.

Adoption policies in regards to gay and lesbian parents also vary greatly from state to state. Some allow adoption by same-sex couples, while others ban all "unmarried couples" from adoption.

=== Family rights after 1980 ===
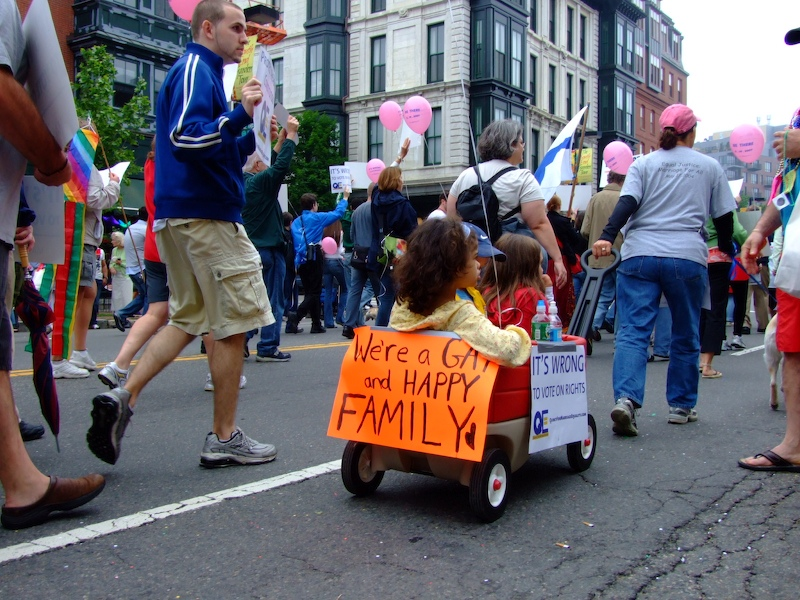
Boston gay pride march, held annually in June

With the withering and downfall of sodomy laws on a state-by-state basis after 1960, LGBTQ rights activists began to develop increasingly detailed demands and campaigns for legal equality at all levels of government, a process which has been incremental in each jurisdiction. In 1984, Berkeley, California became the first jurisdiction to recognize same-sex unions of any type (then in the form of domestic partnership health benefits for city employees). In 1999, California passed its domestic partnership law, becoming the first state to recognize same-sex unions; Vermont became the first state to legalize civil unions (often seen as a reduced version of full marriage rights).

However, following the Stonewall riots, the social conservative movement in the United States became increasingly defined by its opposition to rights for LGBTQ people. The most pre-eminent laws advocated at the federal level by social conservative politicians in the 1990s include Don't ask, don't tell, a continued restriction upon the service of LGBTQ persons in the United States Armed Forces, and the Defense of Marriage Act (DOMA), which defines marriage as a heterosexual-exclusive institution and bars the federal government from recognizing same-sex unions enacted by municipal, state or foreign governments. These were followed by the passage in the 2000s of state-level statutory and constitutional prohibitions of legal recognition of same-sex marriages or unions of any type.

The most controversial moment in the history of the movement for same-sex marriage rights took place in California during the period from May 2008, when the State Supreme Court abrogated Proposition 22, which barred the state from legalizing same-sex marriage, as unconstitutional, to November 2008, when Proposition 8, a proposition against the court ruling brought by social conservatives, passed with 53% of the vote. Protests against the vote and its outcome ensued nationwide among pro-LGBTQ rights activists, media personalities and politicians, resulting in Hollingsworth v. Perry, a Supreme Court challenge to the constitutionality of Proposition 8 which ultimately struck down the initiative.

On June 26, 2015, the Supreme Court ruled in Obergefell v. Hodges that states must license and recognize same-sex marriages. Consequently, same-sex marriage is legal in all 50 states, the District of Columbia, Puerto Rico, Guam, U.S. Virgin Islands, and Northern Mariana Islands. Currently, same-sex marriages are neither licensed nor recognized in American Samoa, due to its unique constitutional status. The legal status of same-sex marriage also varies in Native American tribal nations, as their reservations are considered sovereign entities and were not affected by the Supreme Court's legalization in 2015.

In December 2022, the final version of the bill Respect for Marriage Act repealed DOMA, requiring all U.S. states to recognize the validity of existing same-sex marriages. The law divided American religious groups morally opposed to same-sex marriage; it was supported by some as a suitable compromise between the rights of LGBTQ couples and religious liberty, a position that was taken by the Church of Jesus Christ of Latter-day Saints, but was prominently opposed by the U.S. Conference of Catholic Bishops and the Southern Baptist Convention due to their views on sexual ethics. Religious groups that supported the bill in support of their LGBTQ parishioners include the Episcopal Church, the Evangelical Lutheran Church in America, the Union for Reform Judaism, the Reformed Church in America, the United Church of Christ, and the Presbyterian Church (USA).

== Hate crimes ==
Current U.S. LGBTQ hate crimes laws by state. A national hate crimes law encompasses both sexual orientation and gender identity. Sexual orientation and gender identity recognized in state hate crimes law Sexual orientation recognized in state hate crimes law Sexual orientation recognized for data collection about hate crimes State hate crimes law uninclusive of sexual orientation or gender identity

Even after the decriminalization of same-sex sexual activity, LGBTQ persons have continued to be targeted—violently and non-violently—by individuals who claim any degree of emotional or religious motivation for their crimes. This phenomenon has been variously attributed to the influence of institutional and authoritarian homophobia in various environments. The torture and murder of University of Wyoming student Matthew Shepard in 1998 became a rallying moment for activism against hate crimes, and the landmark Matthew Shepard and James Byrd, Jr. Hate Crimes Prevention Act was passed in 2009 under President Barack Obama; the Act was also the first federal legislation of any purpose to specifically refer to transgender persons. Anti-bullying and anti-hate crime movements increasingly focus on bias against sexual orientation and gender identity.

The Hate Crime Statistics Act of 1990 required data collection about crimes motivated by biases that included "sexual orientation." Since then, the FBI has produced an annual report with relevant statistics. In 2013, the FBI's hate crime report began separately considering bias against "gender identity" and "gender" for the first time.

National data collection can be complicated by inconsistent reporting requirements on the state level. For example, as of 2019, 37 states still do not have anti-bias statutes for crimes based on gender identity.

The FBI reports show that, throughout the 21st century, bias against sexual orientation has consistently accounted for between one-seventh and one-fifth of all reported incidents that were motivated by a single bias.

	# Single-bias incidents	% Sexual orientation	% Gender identity	% Gender
2000	8,055	16.1	–	–
2001	9,721	14.3	--	–
2002	7,459	16.7	--	–
2003	7,485	16.6	--	–
2004	7,642	15.7	--	–
2005	7,160	14.2	--	–
2006	7,720	15.5	--	–
2007	7,621	16.6	--	–
2008	7,780	16.7	--	–
2009	6,598	18.5	--	–
2010	6,624	19.3	--	–
2011	6,216	20.8	--	–
2012	5,790	19.6	--	–
2013	5,922	20.8	0.5	0.3
2014	5,462	18.6	1.8	0.6
2015	5,818	18.1	2.0	0.4
2016	6,063	17.7	2.0	0.5
2017	7,106	15.9	1.7	0.6
2018	7,036	17.0	2.4	0.7
2019	7,103	16.7	2.7	0.9
2020	8,052	20.0	2.7	0.7
2021	10,530	15.9	3.2	1.0
2022	11,288	17.2	4.0	0.9
2023	11,447	18.4	4.1	0.9

=== Violence ===
Violence against LGBTQ people in the US is made up of assaults on gay men, lesbians, bisexual, transgender, queer and intersex individuals (LGBTQI), legal responses to such violence, and hate crime statistics in the United States of America. Gay men are victimized by homophobic violence at a much higher rate than other identities within the LGBTQ umbrella. Those targeted by such violence are often perceived to violate heteronormative rules and contravene perceived protocols of gender and sexual roles. While this violence is sometimes narrowly termed homophobia or gay bashing, combating it is often understood as part of a broader struggle for human rights.

The Transgender Day of Remembrance is organized annually to honor transgender victims of murder.

=== Anti-bullying activism ===
In 2009–2010, a number of suicides by teenage and young adult Americans who were victims of sexual orientation- or gender expression-related bullying by fellow students garnered headlines, bringing to the fore a debate on bullying in schools and other environments. In response, Seattle-area opinion columnist and rights activist Dan Savage participated with his husband in the making of a video which encouraged children and teenagers to resist and overcome peer bullying, inaugurating an ongoing series of videos by politicians, media personalities, business leaders, activists and others both within and outside the United States listed under the It Gets Better Project.

== Interest groups ==
The wide array of LGBTQ-related organizations in the United States includes National Center for Transgender Equality (NCTE), Parents, Families and Friends of Lesbians and Gays (PFLAG), Gay & Lesbian Alliance Against Defamation (GLAAD), Human Rights Campaign (HRC), National Gay and Lesbian Task Force (NGLTF or "the Task Force"), Empowering Spirits Foundation (Empowering Spirits or ESF), Gay & Lesbian Victory Fund, Safe Space America, Independent Gay Forum, and many local LGBTQ community centers.

Freedom to Marry was the leading advocate for same-sex marriage; the organization closed after same-sex marriage was legalized nationwide. Some of the original staff from Freedom to Marry moved to a new organization called Freedom for All Americans, which now seeks to "adapt the multi-level and multi-prong strategies" of the marriage equality movement to a movement for "a broader array of LGBT rights and protections," according to Courtenay W. Daum.

== Support in schools ==
Since the 1980s, Gay Straight Alliance organizations have helped students and teachers and provide resources to their institutions. The 1984 Federal Equal Access Act prohibits schools receiving federal funding from discriminating between clubs. This law has been used in legal challenges to reverse school bans against GSAs. Research has shown that LGBTQ adolescents feel safer and more included when they belong to these groups. Presence of a GSA on campus has been shown to increase LGBTQ student wellbeing and educational attainment.

== Religion ==
Christian denominations that have long supported same-sex marriage include the Unitarian Universalist Association, the Episcopal Church, the Presbyterian Church (U.S.A.), the Reformed Church in America, the United Church of Christ, the Evangelical Lutheran Church in America, and the Metropolitan Community Church.

== See also ==
- Culture of the United States
- Multiculturalism in the United States
- Homelessness among LGBTQ youth in the United States
- Latina lesbian organizations in the United States
- List of LGBTQ members of the United States Congress
- LGBTQ culture in Miami
- LGBTQ culture in New York City
- LGBTQ history in the United States
- LGBTQ movements in the United States
- List of proposed anti-gay book bans in the United States
- Same-sex marriage in the United States
- Sodomy laws in the United States
- Transgender rights in the United States
- African-American LGBTQ community
