= LGBTQ rights in Nevada =

- Nevada (USA)
- Legal status: Legal since 1993
- Gender identity: State does not require surgery to change gender on birth certificate
- Discrimination protections: Sexual orientation and gender identity or expression (see below)

Family rights
- Recognition of relationships: Domestic partnerships legal since 2009; Same-sex marriage since 2014
- Adoption: Same-sex couples allowed to adopt

Lesbian, gay, bisexual, transgender, and queer (LGBTQ) people in the U.S. state of Nevada enjoy the same rights as non-LGBTQ people. Same-sex marriage has been legal since October 8, 2014, due to the federal Ninth Circuit Court of Appeals ruling in Sevcik v. Sandoval. Same-sex couples may also enter a domestic partnership status that provides many of the same rights and responsibilities as marriage. However, domestic partners lack the same rights to medical coverage as their married counterparts and their parental rights are not as well defined. Same-sex couples are also allowed to adopt children. Since 2022 the Nevada Constitution explicitly includes both sexual orientation and gender identity - discrimination laws since 1999 included sexual orientation for employment and expanded thereafter to housing and accommodation (plus added gender identity). In addition, conversion therapy on minors is outlawed in the state.

Nevada is frequently referred to as one of the most LGBTQ-friendly states in the Mountain West. The LGBT think tank Movement Advancement Project ranks Nevada first in the region for LGBT rights legislation. 2017 polling from the Public Religion Research Institute showed that 70% of Nevada residents supported same-sex marriage. In November 2020, Nevada made history in becoming the first U.S. state, by 62% of voters, to enshrine the right to same-sex marriage in the Nevada Constitution. In November 2022, Nevada again made history in becoming the first U.S. state, by 58% of voters, to formally add the words "sexual orientation and gender identity or expression" to the state-based Nevada Constitution.

== History ==
Among the Native Americans, perceptions towards gender and sexuality were very different from those of the Western world. The Northern Paiute people, for instance, recognize individuals assigned male at birth but who act, behave and live as women, known as tüdayapi. Such individuals are known as tüwasawuts among the Southern Paiute.

Nevada adopted a criminal code in 1861 establishing a sentence of five years' to life imprisonment for sodomy. In 1912, the Supreme Court of Nevada held that fellatio constituted a criminal offense. As was the case for such laws around the United States, Nevada's sodomy law criminalized both heterosexual and homosexual oral sex and anal intercourse. It did not, however, criminalize lesbian acts. In 1951, the minimum penalty of sodomy was reduced to one year imprisonment, but the maximum penalty of life imprisonment was retained. This was changed again in 1967 when it was reduced to one to six years. Furthermore, under a 1961 sex offender registration law, those convicted of sodomy had to register with the local sheriff or chief of police and report any change in address. Over the years, the courts convicted multiple people of sodomy, almost consistently upheld by higher courts, and a challenge to the sodomy law on the grounds of vagueness and unconstitutionality was rejected in 1969. In 1973, 1976 and 1978, the Nevada Supreme Court ruled that cunnilingus, masturbation in front of a witness and licking a penis were violations of the sodomy statute.

In 1977, the Nevada Legislature amended the state's sodomy law, redefining the act as "anal intercourse, cunnilingus or fellatio between consenting adults of the same sex", thus legalizing heterosexual activity but also making sexual activity between women illegal for the first time in Nevada's history. The penalty of one to six years' imprisonment remained.

== Legality of same-sex sexual activity ==
Nevada decriminalized sodomy in 1993, ten years before the U.S. Supreme Court in Lawrence v. Texas struck down laws that criminalized private consensual sexual activity. Senator Lori Lipman Brown introduced Senate Bill 466 on May 13, 1993 to decriminalize what the statutes called "infamous crime against nature". At hearings, two doctors linked repealing the sodomy laws with a public health measure to combat the stigma and spread of HIV. Other supporters included Reno Rabbi Myra Soifer, former senators Helen Foley and Jean Ford, gay rights advocate Lee Plotkin, and progressive activist Bob Fulkerson. Opponents included Janine Hansen of the Nevada Eagle Forum and Independent American Party of Nevada and Lynn Chapman who said that repealing the sodomy laws would increase the spread of HIV/AIDS and would "open the floodgate ... in legalizing, condoning and recognizing homosexuality to be on an equal footing with heterosexuality" and lead to "such things as homosexual marriage and adoption of children." In the course of the legislative process, the words "infamous crime against nature" were replaced by "anal intercourse, cunnilingus or fellatio in public". Other amendments, including one to require sex education in schools to provide "factual information regarding the dangers of such activities" of "a homosexual lifestyle or the infamous crime against nature" were defeated. Democratic Governor Bob Miller signed the legislation on June 16, 1993 and it went into effect on October 1, 1993. However, the age of consent for same-sex sexual activity was unequal and set 2 years higher at 18. It was finally equalized at 16 in line with heterosexuals 20 years later on October 1, 2013.

== Recognition of same-sex relationships ==
Nevada voters approved Question 2, an amendment to the Constitution of Nevada that banned same-sex marriage, by 69.6% in 2000 and 67.1% in 2002. (Note: Amendments to the Constitution of Nevada must be approved twice by voters if initiated by the people, or twice by the Legislature and once by voters if initiated by the Legislature.)

On May 21, 2009, the Nevada Legislature passed the Nevada Domestic Partnership Act to grant both opposite-sex and same-sex couples many of the responsibilities, obligations, rights, entitlements and benefits of marriage under the designation "domestic partnership" rather than "marriage". Governor Jim Gibbons vetoed the legislation, saying he did not personally oppose rights for domestic partners but felt he needed to respect the voters' wishes on the question. On May 30 and 31, both the Assembly and Senate overrode his veto. The law went into effect on October 1, 2009. It exempted both private and public employers from having to provide medical coverage for the domestic partners of their employees even if they did so for their employees' married spouses. Whether other jurisdictions will recognize a Nevada domestic partnership is uncertain, as are some parental rights normally held by married couples. Even in Arizona, the status of domestic partner can be misunderstood and is not always recognized as the equivalent of marriage.

On April 10, 2012, Lambda Legal filed a lawsuit, Sevcik v. Sandoval, in the U.S. District Court for the District of Nevada on behalf of eight same-sex couples, claiming that Nevada's categorization of same-sex domestic partnerships consigns same-sex couples to "a lesser, second-class status" and constitutes a violation of the U.S. Constitution's guarantee of equal protection. Chief Judge Robert Jones ruled on November 29 that Nevada's denial of marriage rights to same-sex couples does not violate the Equal Protection Clause. Lambda Legal said it would appeal the decision. On October 7, 2014, the Ninth Circuit Court of Appeals struck down Question 2, explicitly reversing Judge Robert Jones' district court ruling, thus making same-sex marriages legal.

Since July 1, 2017, Nevada's marriage statute has incorporated gender-neutral language, thereby explicitly recognizing same-sex marriage in state law. On November 3, 2020, Nevada voters amended the Nevada Constitution to remove the 2002 language banning same-sex marriage. The measure, known as Question 2, was approved with 62% in favor.

In December 2020, the Nevada Supreme Court concluded that the state must retroactively recognize same-sex marriages performed in other jurisdictions before the Sevcik decision in 2014.

=== Federal income tax ===
The Internal Revenue Service ruled in 2013, based on the Supreme Court DOMA ruling, that same-sex individuals who have been married in any state where same-sex marriage is legal may file their federal returns as married filing jointly regardless of state of residency.

== Discrimination protections and anti-bullying laws ==
During the 1999 legislative session, the Nevada Legislature added prohibition of discrimination based on a person's actual or perceived sexual orientation in public and private employment and public accommodations to state law. In the 2011 legislative session, Governor Brian Sandoval approved and signed into law three bills; A.B. 211, S.B. 331, and S.B. 368 which prohibit discrimination in areas of employment, housing and public accommodation on the basis of "gender identity or expression". S.B. 331 prohibits discrimination on the basis of sex in public accommodations, and S.B. 368 prohibits housing discrimination on the basis of sexual orientation. All three laws took effect on October 1, 2011.

In January 2014, the Ninth Circuit Court of Appeals ruled that it is illegal to discriminate against LGBTQ people in jury selections, holding that such dismissals "deprive individuals of the opportunity to participate in perfecting democracy and guarding our ideals of justice on account of a characteristic that has nothing to do with their fitness to serve".

In May 2015, an anti-bullying bill, SB 504, passed the Nevada Legislature. Governor Brian Sandoval signed the bill into law days later. The bill went into full effect on July 1, 2015. It explicitly includes "actual or perceived race, color, national origin, ancestry, religion, gender identity or expression, sexual orientation, physical or mental disability of a person, sex or any other distinguishing characteristic or background of a person" as protected grounds. The law directs the Department of Education to prescribe policies for schools to address bullying and cyberbullying, procedures for reporting and investigating, requirements for parent notification and provisions to train teachers and staff to properly address bullying.

In May 2017, the Nevada Legislature passed a bill adding sexual orientation and gender identity or expression throughout the rest of Nevada's statutes, alongside race, disability, creed, sex, religion, marital status, domestic partnership status, age, etc. The law went into effect on July 1, 2017.

In 2019, the Nevada Legislature passed SJR8A to add sexual orientation and gender identity to the equal protection clause of the Nevada Constitution. As a constitutional amendment, the legislation required approval in the 2021 legislative session, which happened in March 2021. The measure Question 1 formally appeared on the ballot within November 2022, and was given 58% approval from voters - making Nevada the first US state in history to approve adding the words "sexual orientation and gender identity or expression" to its state-based Constitution.

== Hate crime law ==
Nevada law provides additional penalties for the commission of a crime because of certain actual or perceived characteristics of the victim. In 2001, Nevada amended its hate crime law to include sexual orientation, without addressing gender identity or expression. In 2011, Senator David Parks introduced S.B. 180 to add "gender identity or expression" to Nevada's hate crime law. One Democrat, John Lee, voted with the Republicans and the bill failed. In 2013, S.B. 139, which would add "gender identity or expression" to Nevada's hate crime law, was introduced by a bipartisan group and passed the Senate on a vote of 20–1. Senator Joe Hardy, the only vote against the legislation, later said that he should have voted in favor after talking with Senator Pat Spearman, the legislature's first out person of color, a pastor and military veteran. The legislation passed the Assembly on a vote of 30–11 on May 14. Governor Brian Sandoval signed the legislation on May 21, 2013, and the new law took effect on October 1, 2013.

In May 2023, Governor Joe Lombardo vetoed a bill (SB171) that passed the Nevada Legislature - to explicitly ban individuals with criminal records “convicted of hate crimes, intimidation, harassment and/or similar acts” from purchasing and possessing firearms, explosives, weapons and/or guns.

In January 2025, a hate crime reporting hotline was established within Nevada.

== Adoption and parenting ==
Same-sex relationships have not been a legal barrier to adoption or parenting in the state, though only since 2017 has state law reflected that same-sex couples have the same parental rights as heterosexual couples.

Lesbian couples are allowed to access assisted reproduction services, such as in vitro fertilisation. State law recognizes the non-genetic, non-gestational mother as a legal parent to a child born via donor insemination, irrespective of the marital status of the parents. In addition, Nevada permits and recognizes gestational surrogacy arrangements. The state treats same-sex couples and different-sex couples equally under the same terms and conditions. Traditional surrogacy contracts are illegal regardless of sex or sexual orientation.

In June 2021, a bill (AB115) passed the Nevada Legislature and the Governor of Nevada signed it into law effective immediately - to legally recognise more than two parents on birth certificates by a court order, allowing for example a surrogate and both intended parents to be listed or a couple and an ex-partner (regardless of marital status). Similar laws were implemented within California in 2013.

== Gay panic defense ==
In May 2019, the Nevada Legislature passed a bill, by a vote of 36–3 in the Assembly and 19–2 in the Senate, to repeal the gay panic defense. On May 14, Governor Steve Sisolak signed the bill into law, and it went into effect on October 1, 2019. Nevada joined several other states in doing so, including California and Illinois.

== Conversion therapy ==
In April 2017, the Nevada Senate passed a bill to ban conversion therapy on minors, by a vote of 15 to 5. The bill was voted on by the Nevada Assembly on May 9, where it passed 31–8 with some amendments. The Nevada Senate concurred to the amended version on the same day. The bill was signed by Governor Brian Sandoval on May 17, and went into effect on January 1, 2018.

== Transgender rights ==
Since 2016, the Nevada Vital Records will issue a new birth certificate with a corrected gender marked upon receipt of two affidavits reflecting an individual's preferred gender. Sex reassignment surgery is not required to change gender on birth certificates. Similar changes to driver's licenses and state IDs are also permitted. In May 2017, legislation unanimously passed the Nevada Legislature to abolish the 1988 requirement for transgender people to publish their names in newspapers before they can undergo legal changes of sex on government documents.

On June 22, 2017, Governor Brian Sandoval vetoed a bill that would have required insurance companies in Nevada to cover all sex reassignment surgery costs, among other things. In March 2018, the state's Medicaid agency announced it would cover costs related to sex reassignment surgeries for transgender individuals. In addition, under state law, health insurance providers are banned from discriminating against transgender patients.

The Department of Motor Vehicles and the Office of Vital Records provide a "third gender" designation (known as "X") on driver's licenses, birth certificates and state ID cards. No medical documentation is required.

In May 2023, the Governor of Nevada (who happens to be a former Sheriff) approved a bill that recently passed the Nevada Legislature which explicitly legally protects and shields transgender and/or intersex individuals as inmates within state-based Correctional facilities. Similar laws are implemented in California, Connecticut and Massachusetts. In the same month, the Nevada Legislature passed an "extensive and broadbased omnibus bill" (SB302) to - (1) protect and defend gender-affirming healthcare services within Nevada; (2) reform healthcare itself within Nevada; (3) protect and defend abortion within Nevada and (4) mandate compulsory sexual reassignment surgery coverage within Medicaid (state-based insurance) within Nevada. The Governor of Nevada vetoed the bill.

A bill requiring health insurers including Medicaid to cover all medically necessary gender-affirming treatments and prohibiting insurance companies from discriminating against transgender people on the basis of their gender identity was passed by the Nevada Legislature in June 2023. The bill was subsequently signed into law by the governor - effective from January 1, 2024.

In June 2023, the Governor of Nevada signed a "compahensive budget bill" (despite going against his own party the GOP) for insurers of insurance companies mandating sexual reassignment surgery purposes - so state funding could be secured for a proposed stadium within Las Vegas. The Governor of Nevada has no "item line veto power".

In April 2025 The Nevada Interscholastic Activities Association reversed a 2016 policy now requiring transgender athletes to compete on teams according to their sex at birth.

=== Sports ===
In April 2025 the Nevada Interscholastic Activities Association (NIAA) voted to reverse its previous (2016) policy such that transgender athletes in Nevada high schools are no longer allowed to compete on teams based on their gender identity.

During Nevada Governor Joe Lombardo’s tenure, he sought to restrict transgender athletes’ participation in collegiate sports, including by supporting a 2026 ballot initiative that would have required school sports programs to classify athletes as male, female, or coeducational and generally determine eligibility based on sex assigned at birth. The initiative ultimately failed to reach the November 2026 ballot, and the number of signatures received in support of the question was not reported.

== HIV laws ==
In May 2019, the Nevada Legislature passed a bill to establish a HIV taskforce in Nevada and other related HIV legal reforms. The legislation passed the Assembly by 37 votes to 3, and the Senate by 21 votes to 0. The Governor of Nevada signed the bill into law and it went into effect immediately. In May 2021, the Nevada Legislature passed a bill (SB275) to repeal archaic bias HIV crimes from the Nevada Penal Code - that date back to 1983 during the HIV pandemic. The Governor of Nevada signed the bill into law effective immediately.

== COVID data collection ==
In August 2020, Nevada became the fourth jurisdiction in the US (after California, New York and Pennsylvania) to include sexual orientation and gender identity in its COVID-19 investigation module. Data collection will allow health officials to cross-reference different indicators to identify what groups are most at-risk of contracting the virus. Julia Peek, a deputy administrator at the State Public Health Department, said, "If I wanted to know how many people reported they were homeless, and also reported that they were transgender, you could make those two variables match", adding that the data will help officials make more informed decisions concerning direct resources and locate testing sites.

== LGBT education curriculum bill ==
In May 2021, the Nevada Legislature passed a bill to implement LGBT education curriculum (e.g. LGBT history) within Nevada public schools. The Governor of Nevada signed the bill into law and goes into effect on July 1, 2022. Both California and Oregon next door have similar laws.

== Public opinion ==
A July 2011 Public Policy Polling survey found that a plurality of voters in the state supported same-sex marriage. 45% of Nevada voters thought that same-sex marriage should be legal, while 44% thought it should be illegal and 11% were not sure. A separate question on the same survey found that 77% of Nevada voters supported the legal recognition of same-sex couples, with 39% supporting same-sex marriage, 38% supporting civil unions but not marriage, 22% favoring no legal recognition and 2% not sure.

An August 2012 Public Policy Polling survey found that a plurality of voters in the state supported same-sex marriage. 47% of Nevada voters thought that same-sex marriage should be legal, while 42% thought it should be illegal and 11% were not sure. A separate question on the same survey found that 80% of Nevada voters supported the legal recognition of same-sex couples, with 40% supporting same-sex marriage, 40% supporting civil unions but not marriage, 17% favoring no legal recognition and 2% not sure.

A February 2013 poll found majority support for same-sex marriage among Nevada voters. The Retail Association of Nevada poll found that 54% were in favor of it, 43% were opposed, and 3% had no opinion on the matter.

A September 2013 Retail Association of Nevada poll found that 57% of Nevada voters favored same-sex marriage, while 36% were opposed. 6% were unsure.

A 2017 Public Religion Research Institute poll found that 70% of Nevada residents supported same-sex marriage, while 23% were opposed and 7% were unsure.

Public opinion for LGBTQ anti-discrimination laws in Nevada
Poll source	Date(s) administered	Sample size	Margin of error	% support	% opposition	% no opinion
Public Religion Research Institute	January 2-December 30, 2019	463	?	69%	23%	8%
Public Religion Research Institute	January 3-December 30, 2018	472	?	68%	26%	6%
Public Religion Research Institute	April 5-December 23, 2017	832	?	73%	21%	6%
Public Religion Research Institute	April 29, 2015-January 7, 2016	690	?	74%	21%	5%

== Summary table ==
Same-sex sexual activity legal	Yes (Since 1993)
Equal age of consent (16)	Yes (Since 2013)
Both anti-discrimination and hate crime laws implemented; sexual orientation and gender identity protections explicitly included in state constitution	Yes (Since 1999 for sexual orientation in employment; since 2011 in all other areas, and since 2022 constitutionally)
Same-sex marriages	Yes (Since 2014; codified in state statues in 2017 and constitutionally in 2020)
Recognition of same-sex couples (e.g. domestic partnership)	Yes (Since 2009)
Insurance covering sexual reassignment surgery within state-based healthcare	Yes (Since 2024)
Joint and step-child adoption by same-sex couples recognised	Yes (Since 2014)
Lesbians, gays and bisexuals allowed to serve openly in the military	Yes (Since 2011)
Transgender people allowed to serve openly in the military	(Since 2025, under an executive order and by the Supreme Court of the United States)
Intersex people allowed to serve openly in the military	(Current DoD policy bans "hermaphrodites" from serving or enlisting in the military)
Gay and trans panic defense banned	Yes (Since 2019)
Conversion therapy banned on minors	Yes (Since 2018)
IVF access for lesbian couples	Yes
Ban on book bans law implemented	X
Third gender option	Yes (Since 2019)
Right to change legal gender	Yes
MSMs allowed to donate blood	Yes (Since 2023, on the condition of being monogamous)

== See also ==
- Politics of Nevada
- LGBT rights in the United States
- Rights and responsibilities of marriages in the United States
- Same-sex marriage in Nevada
