= Paul Anderson (Nevada politician) =

American politician

Member of the Nevada Assembly from the 13th district
- In office November 5, 2012 – September 20, 2017
- Preceded by: Scott Hammond
- Succeeded by: Tom Roberts

Personal details
- Born: 1970 (age 55–56) Las Vegas, Nevada, U.S.
- Party: Republican
- Education: Chapman University
- Website: anderson4nv.com

Dennis Paul Anderson (born 1970 in Las Vegas, Nevada) is an American politician and a Republican member of the Nevada Assembly from 2012 to 2017 representing District 13. Anderson is also the founder and president of a technology company named AndersonPC, founded in 1996.

Anderson resigned in 2017 to take a job with the Governor's Office of Economic Development.

In July 2019, Anderson joined Boyd Gaming replacing Bill Noonan, who retired, as the Senior Vice President of Industry and Governmental Affairs.

== Education ==
Anderson earned his BS in business and finance from Chapman University.

== Elections ==
- 2012 when Republican Assemblyman Scott Hammond ran for Nevada Senate and left the House District 13 seat open, Anderson won the June 12, 2012 Republican Primary with 1,680 votes (68.49%) and won the November 6, 2012 General election with 14,271 votes (54.20%) against Democratic nominee Louis Desalvio, who had run for the seat in 2010.
- 2014 Republican Assemblyman Paul Anderson was re-elected to Assembly District 13. Anderson ran unopposed in the June Primary election and won the November 4th, 2014 with 9,493 votes (62.28%) against Democratic nominee Christine Kramar.
- 2016 Republican Assemblyman Paul Anderson was re-elected to Assembly District 13. Anderson won the June, 2016 primary with 62.16% of the vote against two Republican opponents Steve Sanson and Leonard Foster. Anderson won the November general election with 23,897 votes running unopposed.

== Nevada State Legislative Service ==
=== Years in Assembly ===
November 2012 to September 2017

=== Leadership ===
Assembly Majority Floor Leader, 2015; 2015 Special Session; and 2016 Special Session

Assembly Minority Floor Leader, 2017

Interim Finance Committee: 2013; 2015; 2017 (part)

Served as Vice Chair from January 22, 2015, to February 1, 2015,

Served as chair from February 2, 2015, to November 7, 2016

=== Assembly Committees ===
Commerce and Labor (2015; 2017)

Natural Resources, Agriculture, and Mining (2013)

Taxation (2017)

Transportation (2013)

Ways and Means (2013; 2015, chair; 2017)

=== Interim Committees ===
Advisory Committee to Develop a Plan to Reorganize the Clark County School District (A.B. 394) (2015-2016)

Commission on Educational Technology (2013-2014; 2015–2016)

Committee to Consult With the Director (2013-2014; 2015–2016)

Information Technology Advisory Board (2013-2014; 2015–2016)

Interim Finance Committee's Subcommittee to Review and Advise on the Development of Priorities and Performance Based Budgeting (PPBB) by the Department of Administration, Budget Division (2013-2014)

Interim Retirement and Benefits Committee (2015-2016)

Technological Crime Advisory Board (2013-2014)
