= Same-sex marriage in Nevada =

Same-sex marriage has been legally recognized in Nevada since October 9, 2014, when the U.S. District Court for the District of Nevada issued an injunction against enforcement of Nevada's same-sex marriage ban, acting on order from the Ninth Circuit Court of Appeals. A unanimous three-judge panel of the Ninth Circuit had ruled two days earlier in Sevcik v. Sandoval that the state's ban on same-sex marriage was unconstitutional. Same-sex marriage was previously banned by an amendment to the Constitution of Nevada. The statutory ban on same-sex marriages was repealed by the Nevada Legislature in 2017, and the constitutional ban was repealed by voters in 2020 by 62–38 percent. Polling suggests that a large majority of Nevada residents support the legal recognition of same-sex marriage, with a 2024 Public Religion Research Institute poll showing that 72% of respondents supported same-sex marriage.

Nevada has recognized domestic partnerships since October 1, 2009, after the Nevada Legislature enacted legislation overriding a veto from Republican Governor Jim Gibbons. The state maintains a domestic partnership registry that enables same-sex couples to enjoy most of the same rights as married couples. It allows opposite-sex couples to establish domestic partnerships as well.

== Domestic partnerships ==
Efforts to recognize same-sex unions as reciprocal beneficiary relationships, similar to Hawaii's, were heavily opposed by conservative and religious groups, and a bill to this effect was defeated in 2001. Senate Bill 283, legislation creating domestic partnerships in which unmarried couples–both same-sex couples and different-sex couples–would enjoy most of the rights of married couples, was sponsored by openly gay Senator David Parks of Las Vegas in 2009. To attract support, he modified his original draft so that the legislation exempted both private and public employers from having to provide health care benefits to their employees' domestic partners. It passed the Senate on April 21, 2009, on a 12–9 vote, and the Nevada State Assembly passed the legislation 26–14 on May 15. On May 25, Governor Jim Gibbons vetoed the legislation. In his veto message he wrote: "I believe because the voters have determined that the rights of marriage should apply only to married couples, only the voters should determine whether those rights should equally apply to domestic partners." On May 30, the Senate overrode Gibbons' veto on a 14–7 vote, and the Assembly overrode the veto the next day on a 28–14 vote, obtaining the two-thirds vote needed to override the veto. The law took effect on October 1, 2009. It allows opposite-sex couples to establish domestic partnerships as well.

The Nevada Domestic Partnership Act provides many of the state-level rights, responsibilities, obligations, entitlements and benefits of marriage. They differ from marriage in lacking a requirement that businesses and governments provide health benefits to the domestic partners of their employees if they do so for the spouses of their married employees. Domestic partnerships are also not granted federal benefits, including in areas relating to tax and social security. Further, they differ from marriages in that a couple forming a domestic partnership must share a common residence. Domestic partners must be at least 18 years old, the same age required for marriage. While someone who wishes to marry can do so at age 16 with the consent of one parent, no comparable exception is provided for someone who wishes to enter into a domestic partnership before the age of 18.

Some rights provided by a Nevada domestic partnership are:

- Hospital visitation, health care decision-making, and information-access rights
- Inheritance rights, including the right to administer the estate of an intestate domestic partner, and business succession rights
- Rights regarding cemetery plots, disposition of remains, anatomical donations, and ordering of autopsies
- Ability to bring a wrongful death action based on the death of the partner
- Community property, domestic violence and testimonial privileges rules apply
- Dissolution laws apply (with only a few exceptions)
- Ability to sue on behalf of the community
- Certain property transfers between partners are not taxed
- State veterans' benefits apply
- Appointed and elected officials' domestic partners are subject to the same laws and regulations that apply to officials' spouses
- Rights regarding employment benefits, including sick leave to care for a domestic partner, wages and benefits when a domestic partner is injured, access to unpaid wages upon the death of a domestic partner, and eligibility for unemployment insurance, disability insurance benefits and workers' compensation coverage
- Insurance rights, including rights under group policies, policy rights after the death of a domestic partner, conversion rights and continuing coverage rights
- Rights related to adoption, child custody and child support

== Same-sex marriage ==
Same-sex marriage in the United States

=== Legal restrictions ===
In 1975, Nevada's marriage statute was amended to expressly state that "a male and a female person...may be joined in marriage". The LGBT community in Nevada enjoyed a series of political victories in the 1990s, including the repeal of a law that criminalized consensual same-sex sexual relations and the passage of a law banning discrimination on the basis of sexual orientation. In 1998, the Mayor of Las Vegas, Jan Jones Blackhurst, issued a proclamation declaring February 12 as the National Freedom to Marry Day, a move considered "unprecedented" by local activists. Around the time the federal Defense of Marriage Act (DOMA) was passed in 1996, religious and conservative groups began campaigning to pass a constitutional amendment banning same-sex marriage in Nevada. A local version of the National Coalition for the Protection of Marriage was founded in 1999. The group succeeded in filing a petition to amend the Constitution of Nevada prohibiting same-sex marriages and banning the state from recognizing same-sex marriages validly performed elsewhere. Opponents of same-sex marriage gained momentum in Nevada by the successful campaign in California to pass Proposition 22.

"Caught by surprise and unprepared", LGBT activists were severely underfunded compared to their opponents, who ran media campaigns and raised billboards. Most of the funding to opponents of same-sex marriage came from Mormons in Nevada. The amendment, as Question 2, was placed on the ballot in November 2000, and passed with 69% of the vote. It required approval a second time in 2002, (Note: Amendments to the Constitution of Nevada must be approved twice by voters if initiated by the people, or twice by the Legislature and once by voters if initiated by the Legislature.) when it passed with 67% of the vote. Richard Ziser, a real estate investor, headed the Coalition for the Protection of Marriage, which led the successful campaign that amended the State Constitution to define marriage as a union between "one man and one woman." A month after Question 2 was approved by Nevada voters, the government of the Republic of Molossia, an unrecognized micronation near Dayton, issued a proclamation regarding same-sex marriage effective from December 29, (Note: The decree is known as Proclamation 021229b (Esperanto: Proklamo 021229b; Spanish: Proclamación 021229b).) that "Discrimination against any individual in any manner on the grounds of sexual orientation is absolutely prohibited. [...] This prohibition includes but is not limited to: discrimination as regards marriage (Partnering), inheritance, jobs, justice and the redress of wrongs, education, and spiritual sustenance. [...] Furthermore, no distinction will be made between homosexual relationships and heterosexual relationships. Both will be treated equally by the Government of the Republic of Molossia, its agencies, any private organization or agency (to include religious institutions), and any and all private citizens."

=== Repeal of discriminatory laws ===
A bill to make the marriage statute gender-neutral was introduced to the Nevada State Assembly by Representative Ellen Spiegel on February 21, 2017. The legislation passed the Assembly on April 17 in a 28–10 vote, and the Senate followed on May 17 with a 20–1 vote. It was signed into law by Governor Brian Sandoval on May 26, and took effect on July 1, 2017. Nevada statutes now read:

Except as otherwise provided in subsection 2 and NRS 122.025, two persons, regardless of gender, who are at least 18 years of age, not nearer of kin than second cousins or cousins of the half blood, and not having a spouse living, may be joined in marriage. [NRS § 122.020]

April 17, 2017 vote in the Assembly
| Political affiliation | Voted for | Voted against | Absent (Did not vote) |
|---|---|---|---|
| Democratic Party | 26: Elliot Anderson; Nelson Araujo; Teresa Benitez-Thompson; Shannon Bilbray-Axelrod; Chris Brooks; Irene Bustamante Adams; Maggie Carlton; Richard Carrillo; Lesley Cohen; Skip Daly; Olivia Diaz; Edgar Flores; Jason Frierson; Ozzie Fumo; Sandra Jauregui; Amber Joiner; William McCurdy II; Brittney Miller; Daniele Monroe-Moreno; Dina Neal; Ellen Spiegel; Michael Sprinkle; Heidi Swank; Tyrone Thompson; Justin Watkins; Steve Yeager | – | 1: James Ohrenschall |
| Republican Party | 2: Keith Pickard; Jill Tolles | 10: Paul Anderson; Chris Edwards; John Hambrick; Ira Hansen; Lisa Krasner; Jim Marchant; Richard McArthur; James Oscarson; Robin Titus; Jim Wheeler | 3: John Ellison; Al Kramer; Melissa Woodbury |
| Total | 28 | 10 | 4 |
| Total | 66.7% | 23.8% | 9.5% |

May 17, 2017 vote in the Senate
| Political affiliation | Voted for | Voted against | Absent (Did not vote) |
|---|---|---|---|
| Democratic Party | 11: Kelvin Atkinson; Yvanna Cancela; Nicole Cannizzaro; Mo Denis; Aaron Ford; Mark Manendo; David Parks; Julia Ratti; Tick Segerblom; Pat Spearman; Joyce Woodhouse | – | – |
| Republican Party | 8: Heidi Gansert; Pete Goicoechea; Scott Hammond; Joe Hardy; Becky Harris; Ben Kieckhefer; Michael Roberson; James Settelmeyer | 1: Don Gustavson | – |
| Independent | 1: Patricia Farley | – | – |
| Total | 20 | 1 | 0 |
| Total | 95.2% | 4.8% | 0.0% |

Results of Question 2 (2020) by county: Yes 60–70% 50–60% / No 60–70% 50–60%

In 2013, the Nevada Legislature began work on legislation to repeal the constitutional ban and substitute in its place a gender-neutral definition of marriage. The Senate approved such legislation on April 22 on a 12–9 vote, and the Nevada Assembly passed the resolution on May 23 by a 27–14 vote. It would have required approval by the next legislative session in 2015 and by voters in the 2016 election to take effect. However, as Republicans took control of the Senate following the 2014 elections, no second vote was held. On February 1, 2017, after the Democratic Party took control of the Senate following the 2016 elections, identical legislation (known as Assembly Joint Resolution 2) was introduced to repeal the now-defunct ban on same-sex marriage. The resolution passed the Assembly on March 9 in a 27–14 vote. The Senate amended it to include a religious exemption, after which it passed the bill on May 1 in a 19–2 vote. The Assembly approved the Senate's amendment on May 2. The resolution returned to the Nevada Legislature in February 2019. It was approved by the Assembly on March 29 in a 38–2 vote and by the Senate on May 23, 2019, in a 19–2 vote. As Question 2, it was placed on the November 6, 2020 ballot, (Note: Voters were asked: "Shall the Nevada Constitution be amended to: (1) remove an existing provision that only a marriage between a male person and a female person may be recognized and given effect in Nevada; (2) require that the State of Nevada and its political subdivisions must recognize marriages of and issue marriage licenses to couples regardless of gender, and that all legally valid marriages must be treated equally under the law; and (3) provide that religious organizations and members of the clergy have the right to refuse to perform a marriage, and that no person has the right to make any claim against a religious organization or member of the clergy for refusing to perform a marriage?") and approved with 62% of the vote. It passed in four counties: Clark (64.7%), Washoe (63.5%), Douglas (52.3%) and Storey (50.4%), as well as Carson City (58.0%). Opposition was highest in Eureka (68.4%), Lincoln (68.0%), Esmeralda (66.0%) and Pershing (60.4%) counties.

March 29, 2019 vote in the Assembly
| Political affiliation | Voted for | Voted against | Absent (Did not vote) |
|---|---|---|---|
| Democratic Party | 28: Alexander Assefa; Shea Backus; Teresa Benitez-Thompson; Shannon Bilbray-Axelrod; Maggie Carlton; Richard Carrillo; Lesley Cohen; Skip Daly; Bea Duran; Edgar Flores; Jason Frierson; Ozzie Fumo; Michelle Gorelow; Sandra Jauregui; Susie Martinez; William McCurdy II; Brittney Miller; Daniele Monroe-Moreno; Connie Munk; Dina Neal; Rochelle Nguyen; Sarah Peters; Ellen Spiegel; Heidi Swank; Tyrone Thompson; Selena Torres; Howard Watts III; Steve Yeager | – | – |
| Republican Party | 9: Chris Edwards; Gregory Hafen II; Melissa Hardy; Al Kramer; Lisa Krasner; Glen Leavitt; Tom Roberts; Robin Titus; Jill Tolles | 2: John Ellison; Jim Wheeler | 2: John Hambrick; Alexis Hansen |
| Total (Note: The Assembly had 41 seats at the time due to a vacancy. Representative Olivia Diaz resigned and announced her intention to seek election to the Las Vegas City Council in December 2018.) | 37 | 2 | 2 |
| Total | 90.2% | 4.9% | 4.9% |

May 23, 2019 vote in the Senate
| Political affiliation | Voted for | Voted against | Absent (Did not vote) |
|---|---|---|---|
| Democratic Party | 12: Chris Brooks; Yvanna Cancela; Nicole Cannizzaro; Mo Denis; Marilyn Dondero Loop; Dallas Harris; James Ohrenschall; David Parks; Julia Ratti; Melanie Scheible; Pat Spearman; Joyce Woodhouse | 1: Marcia Washington | – |
| Republican Party | 7: Heidi Gansert; Pete Goicoechea; Scott Hammond; Joe Hardy; Ben Kieckhefer; Keith Pickard; James Settelmeyer | 1: Ira Hansen | – |
| Total | 19 | 2 | 0 |
| Total | 90.5% | 9.5% | 0.0% |

The constitutional amendment went into force on November 24, 2020, making Nevada the first U.S. state to explicitly affirm the right to marry regardless of gender in its state constitution. Section 21 of Article 1 of the Nevada Constitution now reads:

1. The State of Nevada and its political subdivisions shall recognize marriages and issue marriage licenses to couples regardless of gender.
2. Religious organizations and members of the clergy have the right to refuse to solemnize a marriage, and no person has the right to make any claim against a religious organization or member of the clergy for such a refusal.
3. All legally valid marriages must be treated equally under the law.

=== Lawsuits ===
==== Sevcik v. Sandoval ====
On April 10, 2012, Lambda Legal filed suit in the U.S. District Court for the District of Nevada. In the case of Sevcik v. Sandoval, it argued that "[n]o legitimate ... interest exists to exclude same-sex couples from the historic and highly venerated institution of marriage, especially where the State already grants lesbians and gay men access to almost all substantive spousal rights and responsibilities through registered domestic partnership." The case raised equal protection claims but did not assert a fundamental right to marry. On November 29, 2012, Judge Robert C. Jones ruled against the plaintiffs, holding that "the maintenance of the traditional institution of civil marriage as between one man and one woman is a legitimate state interest". The decision was appealed to the Ninth Circuit Court of Appeals.

In February 2014, the state withdrew its brief defending Nevada's ban on same-sex marriage. Governor Brian Sandoval stated: "It has become clear that this case is no longer defensible in court". On October 7, 2014, the Ninth Circuit reversed the decision of the federal district court and remanded it back to the district court, ordering it to issue an injunction to bar enforcement of Nevada's amendment banning same-sex marriage. The court held that Nevada's ban on same-sex marriage constituted a violation of same-sex couples' Fourteenth Amendment right to equal protection. The court also applied heightened scrutiny in concluding that Nevada's ban constituted discrimination on the basis of sexual orientation. On October 9, Judge James C. Mahan issued the injunction and same-sex couples began obtaining marriage licenses. The Ninth Circuit held:

Defendants' argument is, fundamentally, non-responsive to plaintiffs' claims to marriage rights; instead, it is about the suitability of same-sex couples, married or not, as parents, adoptive or otherwise. That it is simply an ill-reasoned excuse for unconstitutional discrimination is evident from the fact that Idaho and Nevada already allow adoption by lesbians and gays. [...] [T]he Coalition [for the Protection of Marriage] argues that Nevada's ban is justified by the state's interest in protecting "the traditional institution of marriage." Modern marriage regimes, however, have evolved considerably; within the past century, married women had no right to own property, enter into contracts, retain wages, make decisions about children, or pursue rape allegations against their husbands. [...] Idaho and Nevada's marriage laws, by preventing same-sex couples from marrying and refusing to recognize same-sex marriages celebrated elsewhere, impose profound legal, financial, social and psychic harms on numerous citizens of those states. [...] The lessons of our constitutional history are clear: inclusion strengthens, rather than weakens, our most important institutions. When we integrated our schools, education improved. When we opened our juries to women, our democracy became more vital. When we allowed lesbian and gay soldiers to serve openly in uniform, it enhanced unit cohesion. When same-sex couples are married, just as when opposite-sex couples are married, they serve as models of loving commitment to all.

Representative Lucy Flores welcomed the court ruling, saying, "Allowing people to marry who they love is the right thing to do." Senator Michael Roberson said that "[t]he state of Nevada should not discriminate against anyone", while Senator Justin Jones said, "This decision wasn't about being a Democrat or a Republican, but about giving those who love one another, regardless of gender, the rights we all deserve." Secretary of State Ross Miller welcomed the court ruling. The first same-sex couple to receive a marriage license were Kristy Best and Wednesday Smith at around 3 p.m. on Thursday, October 9 in Carson City. Theo Small and Antioco Carillo were the first couple to be issued a license in Las Vegas shortly after 5 p.m. on October 9, followed a few minutes later by State Senator Kelvin Atkinson and his partner Sherwood Howard.

==== LaFrance v. Cline ====
The Nevada Supreme Court ruled unanimously in LaFrance v. Cline on December 23, 2020, that the U.S. Supreme Court's decision in Obergefell v. Hodges obliges the state to retroactively recognize same-sex marriages legally performed in other jurisdictions. Mary Elizabeth LaFrance and Gail Cline had a civil union ceremony in Vermont in 2000 and legally wed in Canada in 2003, but their marriage was not recognized in Nevada at the time. In 2014, they divorced and filed for judicial dissolution. The trial court had to decide what property and assets were part of the "community" for purposes of division of assets. District Court Judge Mathew Harter concluded that pursuant to Obergefell he should find that their "community" came into effect when the couple entered into their civil union in 2000, and divided property accordingly. LaFrance appealed, contending that their marital community, for purposes of Nevada law, did not come into effect until the Sevcik decision in 2014. The Nevada Supreme Court decided that a Vermont civil union could be recognized for these purposes solely if the couple had registered it as a domestic partnership, which LaFrance and Cline did not do. The court concluded that their marital community was formed in 2003 in Canada. Even though it was not recognized in Nevada at the time, the court found that it must be retroactively recognized pursuant to Obergefell.

=== Native American nations ===
The Indian Civil Rights Act, also known as Public Law 90–284, primarily aims to protect the rights of Native Americans but also reinforces the principle of tribal self-governance. While it does not grant sovereignty, the Act affirms the authority of tribes to govern their own legal affairs. Consequently, many tribes have enacted their own marriage and family laws. As a result, the Sevcik ruling and the Supreme Court's Obergefell ruling did not automatically apply to tribal jurisdictions. The Law and Order Code of the Fort McDermitt Paiute and Shoshone Tribe states that marriage is governed by state law rather than tribal law. As such, same-sex marriage is legal on its reservation. The Law and Order Code of the Fallon Paiute-Shoshone Tribe generally refers to married spouses as "husband and wife", but states that marriages legally entered into outside the tribe's jurisdiction are recognized. Similar language is found in the codes of the Yomba Shoshone Tribe, and the Washoe Tribe of Nevada and California. The Law and Order Code of the Washoe Tribe generally refers to married spouses as "husband and wife", but does not explicitly ban same-sex marriage. The Code requires the married couple, known in Washo as degumLá:yaʔ (pronounced [degumˈl̥aːjaʔ]), to "consent to the establishment of the relationship of husband and wife between themselves". The laws of the Ely Shoshone Tribe do not allow for the solemnization of same-sex marriages. Its Tribal Code states that "a male and a female person, at least 18 years of age, not nearer of kin than second cousins or cousins of the half blood, and not having a husband or wife living, may be joined in marriage."

Native Americans have deep-rooted marriage traditions, placing a strong emphasis on community, family and spiritual connections. While there are no records of same-sex marriages being performed in Native American cultures in the way they are commonly defined in Western legal systems, many Indigenous communities recognize identities and relationships that may be placed on the LGBT spectrum. Among these are two-spirit individuals—people who embody both masculine and feminine qualities. In some cultures, two-spirit individuals assigned male at birth wear women's clothing and engage in household and artistic work associated with the feminine sphere. Historically, this identity sometimes allowed for unions between two people of the same biological sex. In Shoshone culture, two-spirit individuals are known as ta̲i̲nna waʼippe (pronounced [ˈten.na ˈwaʔip.pɨ]). Traditionally, they performed women's activities but did not always wear women's clothing. Some of them married men, others married women, while others remained unmarried. It was considered inappropriate, however, for two ta̲i̲nna waʼippe to form a relationship. The Northern Paiute refer to two-spirit people who cross out of the masculine gender as tudayapi (pronounced [tɨˈɾajapai]), and they were likewise free to marry either men or women.

=== Demographics and marriage statistics ===
Clark County issued its 10,000th same-sex marriage license on January 20, 2017. 954 same-sex marriages were performed in Clark County in 2014, followed by 4,055 in 2015, 4,778 in 2016, 4,418 in 2017, 4,269 in 2018, 4,233 in 2019, 3,469 in 2020, and 4,563 in 2021. Often referred to as the "Marriage Capital of the World", Las Vegas (and adjacent communities in Clark County) has one of the highest marriage rates in the U.S., attracting many couples from other states and overseas. In 2019, 420 same-sex spouses were from Mexico, 350 from England, 326 from China, 213 from the Philippines, 147 from Canada, 143 from Germany, 115 from France, 90 from Australia and 87 from Brazil, as well as several dozen from Israel, Spain, Cuba, Vietnam, Italy, Venezuela, Scotland, El Salvador and Thailand.

The 2020 U.S. census showed that there were 8,518 married same-sex couple households (4,431 male couples and 4,087 female couples) and 5,986 unmarried same-sex couple households in Nevada.

== Public opinion ==
Public opinion for same-sex marriage in Nevada
| Poll source | Dates administered | Sample size | Margin of error | Support | Opposition | Do not know / refused |
|---|---|---|---|---|---|---|
| Public Religion Research Institute | March 13 – December 2, 2024 | 196 adults | ? | 72% | 26% | 2% |
| Public Religion Research Institute | March 9 – December 7, 2023 | 190 adults | ? | 76% | 21% | 3% |
| Public Religion Research Institute | March 11 – December 14, 2022 | ? | ? | 78% | 20% | 2% |
| Public Religion Research Institute | March 8 – November 9, 2021 | ? | ? | 71% | 22% | 7% |
| Public Religion Research Institute | January 7 – December 20, 2020 | 492 adults | ? | 80% | 16% | 4% |
| Public Religion Research Institute | April 5 – December 23, 2017 | 832 adults | ? | 70% | 23% | 7% |
| Public Religion Research Institute | May 18, 2016 – January 10, 2017 | 977 adults | ? | 67% | 25% | 8% |
| Public Religion Research Institute | April 29, 2015 – January 7, 2016 | 690 adults | ? | 57% | 35% | 8% |
| New York Times/CBS News/YouGov | September 20 – October 1, 2014 | 1,502 likely voters | ± 3.4% | 55% | 31% | 14% |
| Moore Information | September 27–29, 2013 | 500 likely voters | ? | 57% | 36% | 7% |
| Public Opinion Strategies | February 2013 | 500 likely voters | ? | 54% | 42% | 4% |
| Public Policy Polling | August 23–26, 2012 | 831 likely voters | ± 3.4% | 47% | 43% | 10% |
| Public Policy Polling | July 28–31, 2011 | 601 voters | ± 4.0% | 45% | 44% | 11% |

== See also ==
- LGBT rights in Nevada
- Same-sex marriage in the United States
