= Constitution of Nevada =

American state constitution

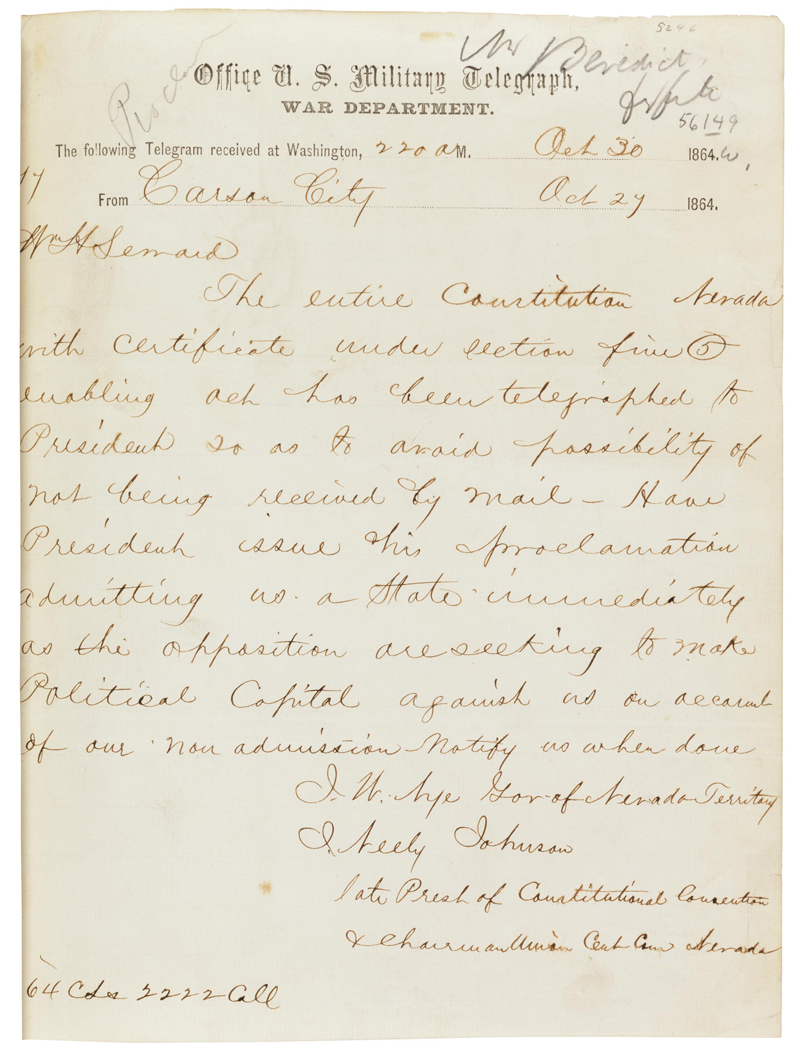
Page 1 of the first Nevada State Constitution, as transmitted to Congress by telegraph, October 1864

The Constitution of the State of Nevada is highest law within the U.S. state of Nevada and defines the structure, power, and limits of the state government and enumerates the basic rights and responsibilities of Nevada citizens, ratified. Subordinate to the Constitution of the United States, the Nevada Constitution requires it be a republic consisting of the bicameral Nevada Legislature, the Supreme Court of Nevada, and the office of Governor of Nevada.

On March 21, 1864, Congress passed an enabling act signed by President Abraham Lincoln authorizing the Territory of Nevada to be admitted as a state pending a ratified constitution. The people of Nevada approved the current Constitution on September 14, 1864, which was delivered to Congress over the course of two days by telegraph (the most expensive ever, at the time) costing US$4,303.27 in 1864 (equivalent to $88,583 in 2025). Nevada became a state with the Nevada Constitution approved on October 31, 1864.

== History ==
Nevada's first constitutional convention met in 1863. The draft as a result of that meeting was rejected by voters on January 19, 1864 because of the draft's taxation policies, particularly regarding mining activities.

The current constitution was written between July 4, 1864 and July 28, 1864 at a second constitutional convention in Carson City.at a convention on July 4 in Carson City.

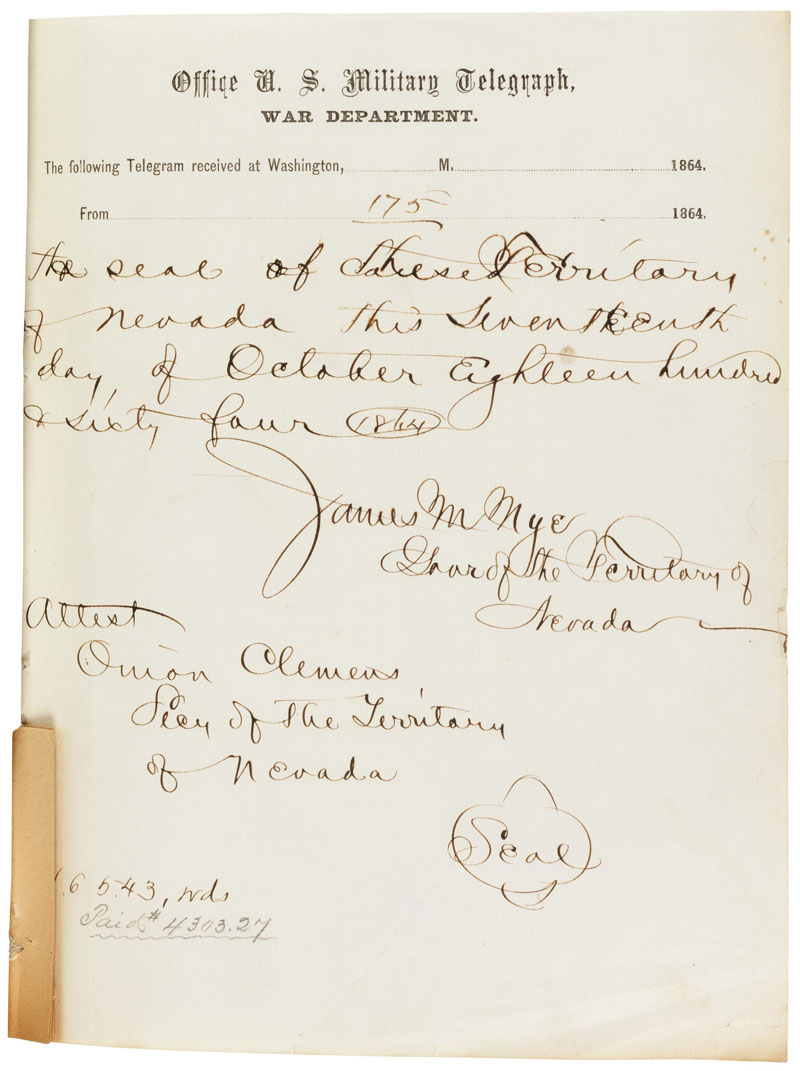
Signature page for the telegraph transmission of the first Nevada State Constitution, October 1864. The handwritten annotation shows the word count (16,543) and cost ($4303.27).

Nevada's entry into full statehood in the United States was expedited. Union sympathizers were so eager to gain statehood for Nevada that they rushed to send the entire state constitution by telegraph to the United States Congress before the presidential election and they did not believe that sending it by train would guarantee that it would arrive on time. The constitution was sent over October 26–27, 1864, just two weeks before the election on November 7, 1864. The transmission took two days; it consisted of 16,543 words and cost $4,303.27 ($88,583 in 2025) to send. It was, at the time, the longest telegraph transmission ever made, a record it held for seventeen years, until a copy of the 118,000-word English Revised Version of the New Testament was sent by telegraph on May 22, 1881.

== General provisions ==
The document has two prefix provisions; a preamble; 19 articles (one having been repealed); and a suffix provision. The first prefix provision defines the requirement that the state have a constitutional convention. The second prefix provision declares certain mandates applicable to the state, including a prohibition on slavery, religious freedom, and declaring the public lands to be property of the United States. Later amendments changed this provision. The preamble reads: "We the people of the State of Nevada Grateful to Almighty God for our freedom in order to secure its blessings, insure domestic tranquility, and form a more perfect Government, do establish this Constitution."

The articles of the Nevada Constitution are:

1. Declaration of Rights
2. Right of Suffrage
3. Distribution of Powers
4. Legislative Department
5. Executive Department
6. Judicial Department
7. Impeachment and Removal From Office
8. Municipal and Other Corporations
9. Finance and State Debt
10. Taxation
11. Education
12. Militia
13. Public Institutions
14. Boundary
15. Miscellaneous Provisions
16. Amendments
17. Schedule
18. [Right of Suffrage] Repealed in 1992
19. Initiative and Referendum

The suffix provision provides for the election of delegates to the constitutional convention.

=== Unappropriated public lands ===
Ownership of the public domain by the United States has become controversial in recent years, the Sagebrush Rebellion and the Bundy standoff are examples of certain groups within the State desire to locally manage the public lands within their borders.

The clause disclaiming any right to unappropriated lands originally stated:

Third. That the people inhabiting said territory do agree and declare, that they forever disclaim all right and title to the unappropriated public lands lying within said territory, and that the same shall be and remain at the sole and entire disposition of the United States; and that lands belonging to citizens of the United States, residing without the said state, shall never be taxed higher than the land belonging to the residents thereof; and that no taxes shall be imposed by said state on lands or property therein belonging to, or which may hereafter be purchased by, the United States, unless otherwise provided by the congress of the United States.

After an amendment ratified in the general election of 1996, the clause reads:

Third. That the people inhabiting said territory do agree and declare, that lands belonging to citizens of the United States, residing without the said state, shall never be taxed higher than the land belonging to the residents thereof; and that no taxes shall be imposed by said state on lands or property therein belonging to, or which may hereafter be purchased by, the United States, unless otherwise provided by the Congress of the United States.

The amendment is specified to take effect "on the date Congress consents to amendment or a legal determination is made that such consent is not necessary".

== Miscellaneous provisions ==
- The constitutional amendment went into force on November 24, 2020. Section 21 of Article 1 of the Nevada Constitution now reads:

“1. The State of Nevada and its political subdivisions shall recognize marriages and issue marriage licenses to couples regardless of gender. 2. Religious organizations and members of the clergy have the right to refuse to solemnize a marriage, and no person has the right to make any claim against a religious organization or member of the clergy for such a refusal. 3. All legally valid marriages must be treated equally under the law." (Sources: Recognition of same-sex unions in Nevada and LGBT rights in Nevada)

- Article 1, section 22, approved by the voters in 2008, limits the power of the state to use eminent domain, which was in response to the decision of the U.S. Supreme Court in Kelo v. City of New London.
- Article 2, Section 10, requires the legislature to set a limit on initiative, referendum, primary or general election contributions to $5,000 each, and to provide for felony penalties for contributions above this limit.
- Article 4, Section 38, permits the use of medical marijuana.
- Article 5, Section 3, limits the governor to two terms, or one if (s)he has served more than two years of someone else's term.
- Article 15, Section 16, sets a minimum wage of $5.15 per hour if the employer provides health insurance, or $6.15 if not.
- Article 8, Section 9, bars subsidies to private companies.

== Amendment procedure ==
Section 1 of article 19 specifies how the Assembly or Senate may propose amendments to the constitution. A majority of all members of both houses must pass the proposed amendment. The proposed amendment must then pass the next consecutive biennial session. If it passes, the proposed amendment is sent to the people for vote. If the majority of the registered votes pass the amendment, the constitution is amended/changed. Sections 2 and 3 of article 19 defines how citizen initiatives for constitutional amendments can be approved. In short, ballot initiatives must be approved in two general elections.

== Sexual orientation and gender identity or expression inclusion ==
An equal rights amendment inclusive of sexual orientation and gender identity/expression was approved by 58% of Nevada voters in the November 2022 general election, making Nevada the only US state - and one of the few jurisdictions in the world - to include “sexual orientation and gender identity or expression” in its foundational document.
