= Tom Roberts (Nevada politician) =

American politician

Member of the Nevada Assembly from the 13th district
- In office November 7, 2018 – November 9, 2022
- Preceded by: Paul Anderson
- Succeeded by: Brian Hibbetts

Personal details
- Born: 1964 (age 61–62) Memphis, Tennessee, U.S.
- Party: Republican
- Spouse: Maria
- Education: Community College of the Air Force; University of Nevada, Las Vegas (BS); University of Oklahoma (MHR)
- Website: Roberts 4 Nevada

Military service
- Allegiance: United States Air Force
- Years of service: 1984–1993

Tom Roberts (born 1964) is a Nevada politician and former law enforcement officer who served as a member of the Nevada Assembly from the 13th district.

== Early life and education ==
Roberts was born in 1964 in Memphis, Tennessee, and grew up in Kentucky. Roberts earned an associate degree in criminal justice from the Community College of the Air Force in 1993, a B.S. in education from the University of Nevada, Las Vegas in 1999, and a master of human relations degree from the University of Oklahoma in 2016.

== Career ==
Roberts joined the United States Air Force at age 19. He served from April 1984 to August 1993, spending nine years a law enforcement specialist.

Roberts served as a police officer in the Las Vegas Metropolitan Police Department from August 1993 until his retirement in January 2018. At the time of his retirement, Roberts was an assistant sheriff. In 2018, Roberts was elected to the Nevada Assembly, where he represented the 13th district between 2018 and 2022.

== Personal life ==
Roberts is married to Maria, and they have two children.
