= Sevcik v. Sandoval =

2014 U.S. legal decision

- District Court Docket: 2:12-cv-00578 Court of Appeals Docket: 12-17668; Supreme Court Docket: 14A374
- Court: U.S. Court of Appeals for the Ninth Circuit
- Argued: September 8, 2014
- Decided: October 7, 2014
- Citations: 911 F. Supp. 2d 996 (D. Nev.), reversed and remanded sub nom. Latta v. Otter, 771 F.3d 456 (9th Cir.)

Case history
- Prior actions: District Court (D. Nev.) November 26, 2012: Judgment for defendants, motion to dismiss granted in part.
- Subsequent actions: Court of Appeals (9th Cir.) October 7, 2014: Mandate issued. October 22, 2014: Response to petition for rehearing en banc ordered. January 9, 2015: Petition for rehearing en banc denied. District Court (D. Nev) October 9, 2014: Judgment entered for plaintiffs, permanent injunction ordered.
- Related actions: Supreme Court October 8, 2014: Stay of mandate ordered in error; amended order vacated this stay.

Holding
- The judgment of the district court is reversed and the case remanded with an order to enjoin Nevada from enforcing the state's same-sex marriage ban.

Court membership
- Judges sitting: Stephen Reinhardt, Ronald M. Gould, and Marsha Berzon

Case opinions
- Majority: Reinhardt, joined by Gould, Berzon

Keywords
- Marriage; Equal Protection; Same-sex marriage; Sexual Orientation

Sevcik v. Sandoval is the lead case that successfully challenged and repealed Nevada's denial of same-sex marriage, as mandated by the state's constitution and statutory law. The case was filed on behalf of eight same-sex couples who either were denied marriage licenses in Nevada or sought recognition of lawful out-of-state marriages, challenging Nevada's statutory and constitutional marriage ban for violating the Equal Protection Clause of the Fourteenth Amendment. The United States Court of Appeals for the Ninth Circuit reversed the district court’s decision and directed entry of judgment for the plaintiffs, effectively ending enforcement of Nevada’s same-sex marriage ban. The plaintiffs' complaint was initially filed on April 10, 2012, in the U.S. District Court for the District of Nevada on behalf of several couples that were denied marriage licenses. These couples challenged the denial, arguing that it violated the Equal Protection Clause of the Fourteenth Amendment to the U.S. Constitution.

On November 26, 2012, Chief District Judge Robert Jones ruled against the plaintiff same-sex couples, granting in part a motion to dismiss the complaint against the Nevada government officials named in it. The plaintiffs appealed to the Ninth Circuit Court of Appeals on December 3, 2012.

Oral arguments in Sevcik and two related cases—Jackson v. Abercrombie and Latta v. Otter—were heard in the Ninth Circuit on September 8, 2014. On October 7, the panel reversed the lower court's ruling in Sevcik, remanding the case to the district court with direction to enter a judgment in favor of the plaintiffs, therefore effectively legalizing same-sex marriage in Nevada. After at least one judge on the Court of Appeals asked for a vote on the defendants' petition to have the case reheard by a larger, 11-judge panel. A majority of judges on the Ninth Circuit did not agree, thus making the ruling final on January 9, 2015.

== Constitutional amendment ==
The Constitution of Nevada was amended in 2002 to incorporate Article 1, Section 21, which reads: "Only a marriage between a male and female person shall be recognized and given effect in this state," restricting marriage to different-sex couples. The Coalition to Protect Marriage, a statewide organization, sponsored the ballot initiative to amend the state's constitution, and the initiative first passed on November 7, 2000, with 70% of the vote. Because Nevada requires that a constitutional amendment be approved by two consecutive elections, Nevada voters considered the same ballot question on November 5, 2002. The amendment once again passed, with 67% of the vote.

== Lawsuit ==
On April 10, 2012, Lambda Legal, an LGBT rights advocacy organization, filed suit in the U.S. District Court for the District of Nevada on behalf of eight same-sex couples. Four of the couples were denied marriage licenses in Nevada solely because they were same-sex couples, and four had valid marriages from other jurisdictions that Nevada refused to recognize as marriages under state law. The plaintiffs challenged the state’s refusal to permit marriage or recognize lawful marriages as violating their rights under the Equal Protection Clause of the Fourteenth Amendment. Four of the couples had been denied marriage licenses by county clerks in Nevada. The other four had married in other jurisdictions (California and Canada) and wanted Nevada to recognize their relationships as marriages. The suit named Governor Brian Sandoval and three county clerks as defendants. Lambda Attorney Tara Borelli explained the plaintiffs' argument:

"[W]e are relying on the Nevada domestic partnership law to help illustrate how irrational the unequal treatment of same-sex couples is, because there are a number of rationales they have articulated for this kind of discrimination that really are not credible in Nevada. For example, it is often argued in these cases that there is an interest relating to children and parenting. But in Nevada, separate and apart from the constitutional amendment, the state treats same-sex couples equally as parents in other respects. And so that can't be what the marriage amendment is about, because it has no effect on parenting."

The plaintiffs argued that Nevada's contrast of marriage and domestic partnership, which it called a "second-class status," distinguished their case from Minnesota's lack of any provision for same-sex couples in 1972, when the Supreme Court in Baker v. Nelson refused to hear a challenge to Minnesota's restrictive marriage definition "for want of a substantial federal question."

As part of their equal protection claim, the plaintiffs argued that the court should evaluate distinctions based on sexual orientation using the heightened scrutiny standard. Instead of asserting a fundamental right to marry or a due process claim, they focused on the equal protection claim and Nevada's disparate treatment of same-sex couples, being "so convinced that our equal protection claim is correct that we wanted to keep the focus of the case there..." Courts often like to decide questions no more broadly than is necessary to resolve a case.

A Nevada reporter noted that both Republican Gov. Sandoval, the principal defendant in the suit, and Democratic Attorney General Catherine Cortez Masto, who was representing him, tended to avoid public controversy, and "both . . . refused to fully engage in the political debate. They're framing their roles as technocrats doing an administrative job rather than as politicians or ideologues wading into an emotional issue."

Judge Robert Jones, Chief Judge of the U.S. District Court of Nevada, held an initial hearing on August 10, 2012. The parties had agreed in advance how they wanted the court to handle motions in the case. The plaintiffs agreed to support the request by the Coalition for the Protection of Marriage, the original backers of the constitutional amendment and now based in Boise, Idaho, to intervene as a defendant. The defendants agreed that the court should postpone consideration of their arguments for summary dismissal until the case was fully briefed. Both sides asked the court to allow them to present expert testimony. Jones did not rule out expert testimony but expressed strong reservations, saying that it would require him to act "as a legislature." He said, "This area you're talking about ... is so broad it's across the entire United States. You're asking them to summarize thousands of incidences." Noting that several related cases were nearing possible consideration by the Supreme Court, he agreed the case should be expedited: "It makes sense to get this decided and off with the circus train." He suggested that Sevcik could complement the Ninth Circuit's decision in Perry v. Brown.

Jones scheduled oral argument on all issues in the case for November 26, but on September 19, he canceled the argument and announced he would rule on the basis of the briefs alone.

== District court decision ==
In the district court, Chief Judge Robert C. Jones ruled on November 26, 2012, that Nevada’s laws reserving civil marriage to opposite-sex couples and refusing to recognize same-sex marriages from other jurisdictions did not violate the Equal Protection Clause. He granted summary judgment to the defendants, determining that the challenge did not overcome existing precedent and that the state’s interests were rationally related to the challenged statutory and constitutional provisions. On November 29, Jones ruled against the plaintiffs. He held that "the present challenge is in the main a garden-variety equal protection challenge precluded by Baker... The equal protection claim is the same in this case as it was in Baker, i.e., whether the Equal Protection Clause prevents a state from refusing to permit same-sex marriages."

Jones also analyzed the plaintiffs' other arguments "so that the Court of Appeals need not remand for further proceedings should it rule that Baker does not control..." He identified the discrimination Nevada makes between marriages the state does and does not recognize as a distinction based not on gender, which would require him to use intermediate scrutiny, but on sexual orientation, stating that the state maintains "heterosexual superiority... by relegating (mainly) homosexual legal unions to a lesser status."

He found that only the rational basis standard applies to distinctions based on sexual orientation, relying on High Tech Gays v. Defense Industrial Security Clearance Office (1990). He argued for the case's determination that "homosexuals are not a suspect or quasi-suspect class" requiring a higher standard of review because "where no lingering effects of past discrimination are inherited, it is contemporary disadvantages that matter for the purpose of assessing disabilities due to discrimination. Any such disabilities with respect to homosexuals have been largely erased since 1990." He also argued that homosexuals have gained significant political power, citing the rarity of anti-homosexual messages in the national media and attributing the president's acceptance of same-sex marriage to "the homosexual-rights lobby." He disputed the Second Circuit's finding in Windsor v. United States (2012) that homosexuals are a politically powerless class: "The question of 'powerlessness' under an equal protection analysis requires that the group's chances of democratic success be virtually hopeless, not simply that its path to success is difficult or challenging because of democratic forces." He states that no action should be taken on unclear constitutional rules, such as "equal protection of the laws," which is a vague clause of the Constitution whose enforcement is "a usurpation of democratic governance via judicial whim—a judicial practice much in vogue today." Having determined that there is no clear constitutional prohibition, he cited a concurring opinion in Frontiero v. Richardson that the Supreme Court should not decide sensitive issues at the very time they are under consideration.

Finally, applying rational basis review, Jones found that "the protection of the traditional institution of marriage... is a legitimate state interest" and quoted Lawrence v. Texas, stating that the prevention of "abuse of an institution the law protects" is a valid state interest. He found that the state may rely on speculation alone for its rational basis, citing Heller v. Doe. If marriage is extended to same-sex couples, he wrote, "it is conceivable that a meaningful percentage of heterosexual persons would cease to value the civil institution as highly as they previously had ... leading to an increased percentage of out-of-wedlock children, single-parent families, ... or other unforeseen consequences." He stated that Nevada has not decreased same-sex couples' rights (having no right to marry to begin with) and that their exclusion from marriage but not from a separate-but-parallel institution can only be seen as "benevolence."

He also addressed issues not raised by the plaintiffs. Plaintiffs had referenced Romer v. Evans (1996) only to note that the Supreme Court in that case had found it unnecessary to consider more than rational basis review. (Note: "Although the Supreme Court has not yet ruled that sexual orientation classifications are suspect, that is because the Supreme Court has not yet found it necessary to resolve the question. Romer v. Evans ... did not decide the issue, finding it unnecessary to look beyond rational basis review both because the state's attempt to strip gay people of all antidiscrimination protections was a 'denial of equal protection of the laws in the most literal sense,' and because the state's action 'confound[ed]' and 'defie[d]' rational basis review." Plaintiff's Motion for Summary Judgement, September 10, 2012) Jones discussed Romer at length to show how it did not apply to Nevada's marriage restriction, since Romer addressed, he wrote, "an extreme case concerning a novel and ambitious type of law ... prevalent only under totalitarian regimes." Nevada's definition of marriage, by contrast, was "not based purely upon anti-homosexual animus, as the constitutional provision in Romer was."

== Appeal ==
Attorneys for the plaintiffs filed an appeal on December 3, 2012, with the Ninth Circuit Court of Appeals. The Court originally planned to hear the case on a parallel track with a similar Hawaii same-sex marriage case, Jackson v. Abercrombie, until Hawaii's legalization of same-sex marriage as of December 2, 2013, mooted that case. The Court placed the case on hold pending the Supreme Court rulings in Hollingsworth v. Perry and United States v. Windsor on June 26, 2013. The Coalition for the Protection of Marriage on December 5, 2012, filed a petition for certiorari before judgment with the Supreme Court, asking that court to take up the case without waiting for action by the Court of Appeals. The Supreme Court denied that petition on June 27, 2013. On October 18, 2013, Lambda Legal filed its opening brief. On January 21, 2014, the state of Nevada submitted its reply brief. On January 24, Nevada Attorney General Catherine Cortez Masto announced she was reviewing the state's brief because the Ninth Circuit's decision in SmithKline Beecham Corporation v. Abbott Laboratories on January 21 established that laws that make a distinction based on sexual orientation are subject to "heightened scrutiny," making the arguments that the state had made based on the less demanding "rational basis" standard "likely no longer tenable in the Ninth Circuit." On February 10, Cortez Masto withdrew the state's brief defending Nevada's ban on same-sex marriage. Governor Sandoval agreed: "It has become clear that this case is no longer defensible in court." On February 12, 2014, the Ninth Circuit issued an order vacating the previous order scheduling the Sevcik and Jackson cases together.

The Ninth Circuit heard oral argument on September 8 before Judges Stephen Reinhardt, Ronald M. Gould, and Marsha Berzon in Sevcik, Jackson, and a third case. It overturned the district court's ruling on October 7, finding Nevada's denial of marriage rights to same-sex couples unconstitutional.

On October 7, 2014, the Ninth Circuit Court of Appeals reversed the decision of the federal district court in Nevada and remanded it back to the district court, ordering it to immediately issue an injunction to bar enforcement of the Nevada same-sex marriage ban amendment. It immediately made its holdings final and issued its mandate. On October 8, U.S. Supreme Court Justice Anthony Kennedy, apparently by mistake, ordered the Ninth Circuit's mandate temporarily stayed as part of his response to a request from Idaho officials in a related case. He amended his order to exempt this case from that stay. The same day, the Coalition for the Protection of Marriage asked the U.S. Supreme Court to suspend implementation of its ruling, referencing the arguments made by Idaho state officials in Sevcik. It withdrew that request the next day and then renewed it on October 13.

== District court remand ==
On remand, the plaintiffs submitted a motion asking the district court for an injunction preventing the state from enforcing its same-sex marriage ban and providing the court with its suggested language. Judge Jones recused himself, and the case was reassigned to Judge James Mahan. On October 9, Judge Mahan issued the injunction, and same-sex couples began obtaining marriage licenses.

== Petition for rehearing ==
The Coalition to Protect Marriage asked the Ninth Circuit to rehear the case en banc. Among other arguments, it presented a statistical analysis that called into question the randomness of the Circuit's method of assigning judges to cases. Attorneys for the same-sex couples, while contending that the method of judge selection could not be grounds for rehearing the case, disputed the Coalition's statistical methodology. After at least one circuit judge called for a vote on the petition for rehearing Sevcik (along with Latta v. Otter) en banc, a majority of active duty judges, as required by Ninth Circuit rules, would not agree to the petition; therefore, such a petition was denied as of January 9, 2015. Circuit Judge O’Scannlain, joined by fellow judges Rawlinson and Bea, filed a written dissent of the denial.

=== Nevada Supreme Court ===
In January 2021, it was decided by the Nevada Supreme Court to "retroactively" apply same-sex marriage (in terms of property and assets), even before the 2014 legal recognition.

== See also ==
- LGBT rights in Nevada
- Same-sex marriage in the Ninth Circuit
- Same-sex marriage in the United States
