= Same-sex marriage in Idaho =

Same-sex marriage has been legally recognized in Idaho since October 15, 2014. In November 2013, four same-sex couples filed suit in Latta v. Otter challenging the state's statutory and constitutional bans on same-sex marriage. On May 13, 2014, the U.S. District Court for the District of Idaho found the bans unconstitutional, but enforcement of that ruling was stayed pending appeal. The Ninth Circuit Court of Appeals affirmed that ruling on October 7, though the U.S. Supreme Court issued a stay of the ruling, which was not lifted until October 15.

Idaho had previously denied marriage rights to same-sex couples by statute since 1996 and in its State Constitution since 2006. Polling suggests that a majority of Idaho residents support the legal recognition of same-sex marriage. Despite this, a number of Republican politicians have continued to introduce unconstitutional legislation to curb the legal rights of same-sex couples or motions urging the overturning of Obergefell v. Hodges, the U.S. Supreme Court case that legalized same-sex marriage nationwide in the United States.

== Legal restrictions ==
=== Statutes ===
After the Hawaii Supreme Court seemed poised to legalize same-sex marriage in Hawaii in Baehr v. Miike in 1993, the Idaho Legislature amended its marriage statutes in 1995 to specify that a marriage was to be "between a man and a woman". The changes took effect on January 1, 1996. Fearing it would have to recognize same-sex marriages conducted in Hawaii, Idaho further amended its marriage laws to prohibit recognition of out-of-state same-sex marriages in 1996. Governor Phil Batt signed the legislation, which took immediate effect on March 18, 1996.

=== Constitutional amendment ===
On February 11, 2004, the Idaho House of Representatives, by a 53 to 17 vote, approved a constitutional amendment banning same-sex marriage and its "legal equivalent" in the state. The Idaho State Senate failed to vote on the amendment. On February 2, 2005, the Senate, by a 14–21 vote, failed to approve a similar constitutional amendment banning same-sex marriage and any "legal status similar to that of marriage". On February 6, 2006, the House of Representatives, by a 53 to 17 vote, approved Amendment 2, a constitutional amendment banning same-sex marriage and any "domestic legal union" in the state. The Senate approved the amendment on February 15 by a 26–9 vote, and it was approved by voters on November 7, 2006. The amendment was found to be unconstitutional by a federal district court on May 13, 2014. The ruling was affirmed by the Ninth Circuit Court of Appeals on October 7, and went into effect on October 15, 2014. Though unconstitutional and unenforceable, the amendment remains on the books. In 2025, Representative Ilana Rubel introduced an unsuccessful bill to repeal the constitutional ban on same-sex marriage. Had it been approved, the measure would have been placed on the ballot for approval by voters.

== Lawsuit ==
Four Idaho lesbian couples filed a lawsuit in the U.S. District Court for the District of Idaho in November 2013, challenging the state's ban on same-sex marriage. On May 13, 2014, U.S. Chief Magistrate Candy W. Dale ruled in Latta v. Otter that Idaho's constitutional and statutory prohibitions against same-sex marriage were unconstitutional under the Fourteenth Amendment. She wrote:

The defendants offered no evidence that same-sex marriage would adversely affect opposite-sex marriages or the well-being of children. Without proof, the defendants' justifications echo the unsubstantiated fears that could not prop up the anti-miscegenation laws and rigid gender roles of days past.

The state appealed the ruling, and on May 20 the Ninth Circuit Court of Appeals stayed enforcement of Dale's ruling pending the outcome of that appeal and ordered the case heard on an expedited basis. On October 7, 2014, the Ninth Circuit Court of Appeals affirmed that the state's same-sex marriage ban was unconstitutional, finding that the ban violated the Fourteenth Amendment's right to equal protection. Idaho's county clerks prepared to process marriage licenses for same-sex couples the following day, October 8, until Supreme Court Justice Anthony Kennedy, in response to a petition from state officials, granted an emergency stay of the Ninth Circuit's decision. Don Moline and Clint Newlan were able to obtain a marriage license in Twin Falls before Justice Kennedy issued the temporary stay. On October 10, 2014, Justice Kennedy, after consulting with the other members of the U.S. Supreme Court, denied the request for a stay and vacated the temporary stay. Latah County issued six marriage licenses to same-sex couples on October 10. That same day, the Latta plaintiffs asked the Ninth Circuit to lift the stay of the district court's order that it had imposed on May 20. The Ninth Circuit gave the parties until October 13 to reply. On October 13, the Ninth Circuit lifted its stay of the district court's order enjoining Idaho officials from enforcing the state's ban on same-sex marriage. The court's lifting of the stay went into effect on October 15, 2014. Rachael and Amber Beierle, plaintiffs in Latta, were the first couple to obtain a marriage license at the Ada County Clerk's Office on October 15. Maryanne Jordan, the president of the Boise City Council, officiated at the marriage, and said, "It's been such a long time coming." More than 50 marriage licenses were issued to same-sex couples that Friday, October 15 in at least 9 of Idaho's counties: Ada, Bannock, Blaine, Bonner, Canyon, Custer, Kootenai, Latah, and Twin Falls.

On October 10, Governor Butch Otter announced that he would no longer contest the ruling in Latta, and state agencies would comply when the Ninth Circuit requires Idaho to provide marriage rights to same-sex couples. On October 14, he announced that his office planned to continue defending the state's ban on same-sex marriage. On October 21, he filed a petition for an en banc rehearing by the Ninth Circuit. The plaintiffs filed a response to the petition opposing an en banc rehearing on November 10, 2014. The Ninth Circuit denied the request for rehearing en banc on January 9, 2015.

== Developments after legalization ==
Same-sex marriage in the United States

A tax conformity bill, which would allow Idaho taxpayers to use federal adjusted gross income on their federal return as a starting point in filling out their Idaho tax form, was opposed by a group of Republican lawmakers in February 2022 who argued that the bill circumvented the Idaho Constitution by approving same-sex marriage. Representative Ron Nate said, "The problem with this is that [the bill] does not protect our constitution in Idaho as it was amended in 2006", as the federal government uses its definition of marriage to allow adjustments. Representative Gregory Chaney disagreed, "Not only are you [Representative Nate] not doing a better job of upholding the Idaho Constitution, you are doing an absolutely miserable job of upholding the United States Constitution. This is another example of where we'd get our rear end kicked, summarily, and then we'd pay the attorney['s] fees for whoever sued us." The bill passed 46–22 in the House. In January 2023, Senator Scott Herndon introduced legislation to eliminate marriage licenses and instead direct officiants to issue marriage certificates following a ceremony between "two qualified people, a man and a woman". Representative Ilana Rubel said the bill appeared to codify that "there would only be marriage recognized between a man and a woman" in Idaho, which would violate the U.S. Constitution. The bill was scheduled to be heard in the Senate Judiciary and Rules Committee on January 23, but was dropped from the agenda just hours before the committee's meeting for unknown reasons.

In January 2025, Representative Heather Scott introduced a motion calling on the Supreme Court to overturn Obergefell v. Hodges, which Scott labelled as an "illegitimate overreach", and allow the state to reenforce its same-sex marriage ban. Democratic leaders Ilana Rubel and Melissa Wintrow issued a joint statement that: "[t]his is yet another example of the extreme wing of the Republican Party ginning up divisive social issues in order to create problems where none exist. Big government has no business telling consenting adults who they should love." The measure encountered significant civil opposition as well, as the majority of Idahoans support the legal recognition of same-sex marriage according to polling. A petition against the resolution gathered thousands of signatures within days. The measure passed the House 46–24 on January 27. A spokeswoman for the Human Rights Campaign said in response, "This cruel action by Idaho Republicans amounts to nothing more than shouting at the wind. A majority of Americans of all political affiliations support marriage equality. Resolutions are not laws, and state legislatures lack the power to dismantle marriage equality. They cannot touch the guaranteed federal protections for same-sex couples under the Respect for Marriage Act." The bill failed to pass the Senate. Two activists for the North Idaho Pride Alliance said:

Rather than address any of the many issues facing Idahoans today, the Idaho Legislature has chosen the fiscally irresponsible route of using Idaho taxpayer dollars to single out LGBTQIA+ people for separate and unequal treatment. They are setting the stage for another discriminatory legislative session by issuing a memorial to the Supreme Court that makes bigoted statements against same-sex marriages and questions the sound legal precedent set by the Obergfell and Windsor cases, as well as a separate resolution that encourages anti-trans actions in universities.

Representative Tony Wisniewski introduced a similar resolution in February 2026. It passed the House 44–26 on March 10, though failed to pass the Senate before adjournment. Rubel described the resolution as "at best, a waste of time and money."

== Native American nations ==
The Indian Civil Rights Act primarily aims to protect the rights of Native Americans but also reinforces the principle of tribal self-governance. While it does not grant sovereignty, the Act affirms the authority of tribes to govern their own legal affairs. Consequently, many tribes have enacted their own marriage and family laws. As a result, the Latta ruling and the Supreme Court's Obergefell ruling did not automatically apply to tribal jurisdictions. Same-sex marriage is not recognized on the reservation of the Nez Perce Tribe of Idaho. Its Tribal Code (Nez Perce: Tamá·lwit) states that "'marriage' means the civil status, condition or relation of a man and woman considered united in law as husband and wife". The Law and Order Code (Ktunaxa: ʔa·knumu¢tiⱡiⱡ) of the Kootenai Tribe of Idaho contains identical language. The Law and Order Code of the Shoshone-Bannock Tribes states that "'marriage is a personal relation arising out of a civil contract, to which the consent of parties capable of making it is necessary", but generally refers to married spouses as "husband and wife". However, the code also states that marriages entered into outside the tribe's jurisdiction are valid if they are valid in the jurisdiction where they were entered into.

Native Americans have deep-rooted marriage traditions, placing a strong emphasis on community, family and spiritual connections. While there are no records of same-sex marriages being performed in Native American cultures in the way they are commonly defined in Western legal systems, many Indigenous communities recognize identities and relationships that may be placed on the LGBT spectrum. Among these are two-spirit individuals—people who embody both masculine and feminine qualities. In some cultures, two-spirit individuals assigned male at birth wear women's clothing and engage in household and artistic work associated with the feminine sphere. Historically, this identity sometimes allowed for unions between two people of the same biological sex. Two-spirit individuals, known in Shoshone as ta̲i̲nna waʼippe (pronounced [ˈten.na ˈwaʔip.pɨ]), traditionally performed women's activities but did not always wear women's clothing. Some of them married men, others married women, while others remained unmarried; however, it was considered inappropriate for two ta̲i̲nna wa’ippe to form a relationship. The Nez Perce call them siʼméec (pronounced [siʔˈmæːts]). They had sexual intercourse with cisgender men, but it is unclear if they were allowed to marry men. In the Coeur d'Alene language, they are known as stʼámya. Verne F. Ray reported in 1932 that he had met a Coeur d'Alene stʼámya who was intersex and remained unmarried. One famous Kutenai two-spirit person was Kaúxuma Núpika, who, after leaving his White fur trader husband, returned to his people and adopted men's clothing and weapons, and took a wife. Kaúxuma was one of the "principal leaders" of the tribe and supernatural powers were attributed to him. He "is remembered among the Kutenai as a respected shamanic healer", a masculine occupation.

== Demographics and marriage statistics ==
Data from the 2000 U.S. census showed that 1,873 same-sex couples were living in Idaho. By 2005, this had increased to 2,096 couples, likely attributed to same-sex couples' growing willingness to disclose their partnerships on government surveys. Same-sex couples lived in all counties of the state, except Oneida, and constituted 0.6% of coupled households and 0.4% of all households in the state. Most couples lived in Ada, Canyon and Kootenai counties, but the counties with the highest percentage of same-sex couples were Lewis (0.90% of all county households) and Adams (0.77%). Same-sex partners in Idaho were on average younger than opposite-sex partners, and significantly more likely to be employed. However, the average and median household incomes of same-sex couples were lower than different-sex couples, and same-sex couples were also far less likely to own a home than opposite-sex partners. 16% of same-sex couples in Idaho were raising children under the age of 18, with an estimated 417 children living in households headed by same-sex couples in 2005.

The 2020 U.S. census showed that there were 2,195 married same-sex couple households (905 male couples and 1,290 female couples) and 1,588 unmarried same-sex couple households in Idaho.

98 and 115 same-sex marriages were performed in Ada County in 2020 and 2021, respectively. 328 same-sex marriages were performed in Idaho in 2022, representing 2.3% of all marriages performed in the state that year. Additionally, there were 81 same-sex divorces, accounting for 1.3% of all divorces.

== Public opinion ==
Public opinion for same-sex marriage in Idaho
Poll source	Dates administered	Sample size	Margin of error	Support	Opposition	Do not know / refused
Public Religion Research Institute	February 28 – December 8, 2025	174 adults	?	62%	36%	2%
Public Religion Research Institute	March 13 – December 2, 2024	161 adults	?	68%	31%	1%
Public Religion Research Institute	March 9 – December 7, 2023	172 adults	?	59%	39%	2%
Public Religion Research Institute	March 11 – December 14, 2022	?	?	64%	36%	<0.5%
Idaho Statesman/Survey USA	October 17–20, 2022	550 adults	± 5.2%	49%	37%	14%
Public Religion Research Institute	March 8 – November 9, 2021	?	?	62%	34%	4%
Public Religion Research Institute	January 7 – December 20, 2020	349 adults	?	48%	40%	12%
Public Religion Research Institute	April 5 – December 23, 2017	461 adults	?	56%	32%	12%
Public Religion Research Institute	May 18, 2016 – January 10, 2017	609 adults	?	54%	36%	10%
Public Religion Research Institute	April 29, 2015 – January 7, 2016	471 adults	?	49%	41%	10%
Public Religion Research Institute	April 2, 2014 – January 4, 2015	309 adults	?	53%	41%	6%
Public Policy Polling	October 9–12, 2014	522 likely voters	± 4.3%	38%	57%	5%
New York Times/CBS News/YouGov	September 20 – October 1, 2014	594 likely voters	± 4.7%	33%	51%	16%

The 2022 poll by the Idaho Statesman/SurveyUSA found that 49% of Idaho voters believed same-sex marriage should remain legal in Idaho if the Supreme Court were to overturn Obergefell v. Hodges, while 37% opposed, and 14% were unsure. Support was highest among Democrats (78%) and Independents (62%), but lowest among Republicans (34%), and higher among women (53%) than men (44%). Support for same-sex marriage was also higher in Ada County (63%) and Canyon County (50%) than the rest of the state (45%).

== See also ==
- LGBT rights in Idaho
- Same-sex marriage in the United States
