= Same-sex marriage legislation in the United States =

In response to court action in a number of states, the United States federal government and a number of state legislatures passed or attempted to pass legislation either prohibiting or allowing same-sex marriage or other types of same-sex unions.

On June 26, 2015, the Supreme Court of the United States ruled in the case of Obergefell v. Hodges that a fundamental right to marry is guaranteed to same-sex couples by the Fourteenth Amendment, and that states must allow same-sex marriage.

== Federal level ==
In 1996, the United States Congress passed and President Bill Clinton signed Public Law 104–199, the Defense of Marriage Act (DOMA). Section 3 of DOMA defines "marriage" and "spouse" for purposes of both federal law and any ruling, regulation, or interpretation by an administrative bureau or agency of the United States government. The impact of Section 2 of DOMA, which relieves jurisdictions within the United States of any obligation to recognize same-sex relationships legally established in any other jurisdiction, is less clear.

In United States v. Windsor, the Supreme Court was asked to determine the constitutionality of Section 3 of DOMA, which defines marriage for federal purposes as the union of a man and a woman. On June 26, 2013, the Supreme Court ruled by a 5–4 vote that the Section 3 of DOMA is unconstitutional.

The State Marriage Defense Act, introduced in the House of Representatives on January 9, 2014, would require the federal government to recognize the validity of a marriage based on a person's legal residence (place of domicile), rather than on the validity of the marriage when and where it was solemnized (place of celebration). The Obama administration has generally used the latter standard. Its sponsors described it as a way to clarify the federal government's response to Windsor and restore the ability of the a state to control the definition of marriage within its borders.

In Obergefell v. Hodges, the Supreme Court was asked to determine the constitutionality of state bans on same-sex marriage licenses as well as state bans on recognition of same-sex marriages from other states. On June 26, 2015, the court ruled by a 5–4 vote that the Fourteenth Amendment obliges states to license same-sex marriages and to recognize same-sex marriages from other states.

In the 111th, 112th, 113th, 114th, and 117th Congresses, the Respect for Marriage Act (RFMA) was introduced by House and Senate Democrats to repeal DOMA. These efforts eventually prevailed in 2022, with the bill passing the House 267–157 and the Senate 61–36. President Joe Biden signed the bill into law on December 13, 2022.

== State level ==
List of U.S. state and territorial statutes and codes, along with the Code of the District of Columbia, recognizing or prohibiting same-sex marriage, civil unions and domestic partnerships Statute recognizes same-sex marriage, civil unions and/or domestic partnerships Statute recognizes same-sex marriage Statute neither recognizes or prohibits same-sex marriage, civil unions and domestic partnerships Statute prohibits same-sex marriage (not enforceable) Statute prohibits same-sex marriage, civil unions and domestic partnerships (not enforceable)

=== Efforts to enable same-sex unions ===
Votes by state legislatures to recognize various types of same-sex unions, sorted by date:

State	Date	Type of same-sex union	Upper house		Lower house		Governor	Final outcome
State	Date	Type of same-sex union	Yes	No	Yes	No	Governor	Final outcome
District of Columbia	June 1992	Domestic partnership	—N/a		Passed		Signed	Yes Yes
California	September 1994	Domestic partnership	21	17	41	26	Vetoed	No No
Hawaii	March 1996	Domestic partnership	14	11	Failed		—	No No
Hawaii	June 1997	Reciprocal beneficiary relationship	24	7	43	27	Signed	Yes Yes
California	September 1998	Domestic partnership	21	17	41	36	Vetoed	No No
California	October 1999	Domestic partnership	23	13	41	38	Vetoed	No No
California	October 1999	Domestic partnership	22	14	41	36	Signed	Yes Yes
Vermont	April 2000	Civil union	19	11	79	68	Signed	Yes Yes
Rhode Island	July 2001	Domestic partnership	Passed		Passed		Signed	Yes Yes
California	August 2001	Domestic partnership (expansion)	22	12	41	27	Signed	Yes Yes
California	October 2001	Domestic partnership (expansion)	23	11	41	32	Signed	Yes Yes
New York	August 2002	Domestic partnership	Passed		147	0	Signed	Yes Yes
New York	August 2002	Domestic partnership (expansion)	Passed		147	0	Signed	Yes Yes
California	September 2002	Domestic partnership (expansion)	26	11	41	31	Signed	Yes Yes
California	September 2002	Domestic partnership (expansion)	23	13	43	27	Signed	Yes Yes
District of Columbia	April 2003	Domestic partnership (expansion)	—N/a		Passed		Signed	Yes Yes
California	September 2003	Domestic partnership (expansion)	23	14	41	33	Signed	Yes Yes
New Jersey	January 2004	Domestic partnership	23	9	41	28	Signed	Yes Yes
Maine	April 2004	Domestic partnership	18	14	84	58	Signed	Yes Yes
District of Columbia	May 2004	Domestic partnership (expansion)	—N/a		Passed		Signed	Yes Yes
California	September 2004	Domestic partnership (expansion)	23	12	46	29	Signed	Yes Yes
New York	September 2004	Domestic partnership (expansion)	Passed		141	1	Signed	Yes Yes
District of Columbia	December 2004	Domestic partnership (expansion)	—N/a		Passed		Signed	Yes Yes
District of Columbia	January 2005	Domestic partnership (expansion)	—N/a		Passed		Signed	Yes Yes
Connecticut	April 2005	Civil union	27	9	85	63	Signed	Yes Yes
Maryland	May 2005	Domestic partnership	31	16	83	50	Vetoed	No No
California	June 2005	Marriage	—	—	Failed		—	No No
Rhode Island	June 2005	Domestic partnership (expansion)	Passed		—	—	—	No No
Rhode Island	July 2005	Domestic partnership (expansion)	Passed		—	—	—	No No
California	September 2005	Marriage	21	15	41	35	Vetoed	No No
California	September 2005	Domestic partnership (expansion)	23	15	47	28	Signed	Yes Yes
California	September 2005	Domestic partnership (expansion)	21	14	47	32	Signed	Yes Yes
District of Columbia	December 2005	Domestic partnership (expansion)	—N/a		Passed		Signed	Yes Yes
New Jersey	January 2006	Domestic partnership (expansion)	39	0	67	8	Signed	Yes Yes
District of Columbia	January 2006	Domestic partnership (expansion)	—N/a		Passed		Signed	Yes Yes
New York	March 2006	Domestic partnership (expansion)	Passed		96	25	Signed	Yes Yes
Maine	April 2006	Domestic partnership (expansion)	Passed		Passed		Signed	Yes Yes
New York	June 2006	Domestic partnership (expansion)	—	—	114	27	—	No No
New York	June 2006	Domestic partnership (expansion)	—	—	116	27	—	No No
Rhode Island	June 2006	Domestic partnership (expansion)	Passed		Passed		—N/a^{4}	Yes Yes
Rhode Island	June 2006	Domestic partnership (expansion)	Passed		Passed		—N/a^{4}	Yes Yes
Rhode Island	July 2006	Domestic partnership (expansion)	Passed		Passed		—N/a^{4}	Yes Yes
Rhode Island	July 2006	Domestic partnership (expansion)	Passed		Passed		—N/a^{4}	Yes Yes
Rhode Island	July 2006	Domestic partnership (expansion)	Passed		Passed		—N/a^{4}	Yes Yes
California	September 2006	Domestic partnership (expansion)	24	15	46	29	Signed	Yes Yes
California	September 2006	Domestic partnership (expansion)	23	15	47	31	Signed	Yes Yes
New Jersey	December 2006	Civil union	23	12	56	19	Signed	Yes Yes
District of Columbia	December 2006	Domestic partnership (expansion)	—N/a		Passed		Signed	Yes Yes
New Hampshire	April 2007	Civil union	—	—	Failed		—	No No
Washington	April 2007	Registered domestic partnership	28	19	63	35	Signed	Yes Yes
Oregon	May 2007	Domestic partnership	21	9	34	26	Signed	Yes Yes
Maine	May 2007	Domestic partnership (expansion)	Passed		Passed		Signed	Yes Yes
New Hampshire	May 2007	Civil union	14	10	243	129	Signed	Yes Yes
Maine	June 2007	Domestic partnership (expansion)	Passed		Passed		Signed	Yes Yes
Maine	June 2007	Domestic partnership (expansion)	Passed		Passed		Signed	Yes Yes
New York	June 2007	Marriage	—	—	85	61	—	No No
Rhode Island	July 2007	Domestic partnership (expansion)	Passed		Passed		—N/a^{4}	Yes Yes
California	September 2007	Marriage	22	15	42	34	Vetoed	No No
California	October 2007	Domestic partnership (expansion)	Passed		Passed		Signed	Yes Yes
Rhode Island	October 2007	Domestic partnership (expansion)	Passed		Passed		Vetoed ^{1}	Yes Yes
New Hampshire	January 2008	Contractual cohabitation	Failed		—	—	—	No No
New York	January 2008	Domestic partnership (expansion)	Passed		—	—	—	No No
New Mexico	February 2008	Domestic partnership	—	—	33	31	—	No No
Washington	March 2008	Registered domestic partnership (expansion)	29	20	62	32	Signed	Yes Yes
Maine	March 2008	Domestic partnership (expansion)	Passed		Passed		Signed	Yes Yes
Maryland	April 2008	Domestic partnership	—	—	86	51	—	No No
Maryland	May 2008	Domestic partnership	30	17	88	46	Signed	Yes Yes
Maryland	May 2008	Domestic partnership	27	20	86	47	Signed	Yes Yes
District of Columbia	May 2008	Domestic partnership (expansion)	—N/a		Passed		Signed	Yes Yes
New Mexico	February 2009	Domestic partnership	17	25	—	—	—	No No
Vermont	April 2009	Marriage	23	5	100	49	Vetoed ^{1}	Yes Yes
Colorado	April 2009	Designated beneficiary agreement	23	10	41	24	Signed	Yes Yes
Connecticut	April 2009	Marriage (codification)	28	7	100	44	Signed	Yes Yes
Maine	May 2009	Marriage	21	14	89	58	Signed	No No^{2}
District of Columbia	May 2009	Marriage (recognition only)	—N/a		Passed		Signed	Yes Yes
Washington	May 2009	Registered domestic partnership (expansion)	30	18	62	35	Signed	Yes Yes^{3}
District of Columbia	May 2009	Domestic partnership (expansion)	—N/a		Passed		Signed	Yes Yes
Maine	May 2009	Domestic partnership (expansion)	Passed		Passed		Signed	Yes Yes
Nevada	May 2009	Domestic partnership	14	7	28	14	Vetoed^{1}	Yes Yes
New Hampshire	June 2009	Marriage	14	10	198	176	Signed	Yes Yes
Oregon	June 2009	Domestic partnership (expansion)	27	0	41	8	Signed	Yes Yes
Wisconsin	June 2009	Domestic partnership	17	16	50	48	Signed	Yes Yes
New York	August 2009	Domestic partnership (expansion)	Passed		142	0	Signed	Yes Yes
California	October 2009	Out-of-state pre-proposition 8 marriage recognition	24	14	44	27	Signed	Yes Yes
New York	December 2009	Marriage	24	38	89	52	—	No No
District of Columbia	December 2009	Marriage	—N/a		11	2	Signed	Yes Yes
Rhode Island	January 2010	Domestic partnership (expansion)	Passed		Passed		Vetoed ^{1}	Yes Yes
Rhode Island	January 2010	Domestic partnership (expansion)	Passed		Passed		Vetoed ^{1}	Yes Yes
New York	January 2010	Domestic partnership (expansion)	61	0	142	0	Signed	Yes Yes
New Jersey	January 2010	Marriage	14	20	—	—	—	No No
New York	March 2010	Domestic partnership (expansion)	—	—	119	20	—	No No
New York	March 2010	Domestic partnership (expansion)	Passed		137	5	Signed	Yes Yes
New York	April 2010	Domestic partnership (expansion)	—	—	132	9	—	No No
Minnesota	May 2010	Domestic partnership (only 1 entitlement)	41	24	78	55	Vetoed	No No
Hawaii	July 2010	Civil union	18	7	31	20	Vetoed	No No
New York	August 2010	Committed partnership	50	11	107	26	Signed	Yes Yes
California	September 2010	Domestic partnership (expansion)	23	12	53	24	Signed	Yes Yes
Illinois	January 2011	Civil union	32	24	61	52	Signed	Yes Yes
Hawaii	February 2011	Civil union	18	5	31	19	Signed	Yes Yes
New Hampshire	March 2011	Domestic union	—	—	Failed		—	No No
Maryland	March 2011	Marriage	25	21	—	—	—	No No
Colorado	March 2011	Civil union	23	12	—	—	—	No No
Washington	April 2011	Recognition of out-of-state union as registered domestic partnership	28	19	58	39	Signed	Yes Yes
Nevada	May 2011	Recognition of out-of-state union as domestic partnership	21	0	41	0	Signed	Yes Yes
Washington	May 2011	Registered domestic partnership (expansion)	27	21	57	40	Signed	Yes Yes
Delaware	May 2011	Civil union	13	6	26	15	Signed	Yes Yes
Nevada	May 2011	Domestic partnership (expansion)	11	10	—	—	—	No No
New York	June 2011	Marriage	33	29	80	63	Signed	Yes Yes
Rhode Island	July 2011	Civil union	21	16	62	11	Signed	Yes Yes
California	September 2011	Domestic partnership (expansion)	22	13	52	25	Signed	Yes Yes
California	October 2011	Domestic partnership (expansion)	25	15	Passed		Signed	Yes Yes
California	October 2011	Domestic partnership (expansion)	24	13	Passed		Signed	Yes Yes
Washington	February 2012	Marriage	28	21	55	43	Signed	Yes Yes^{3}
New Jersey	February 2012	Marriage	24	16	42	33	Vetoed	No No
Maryland	March 2012	Marriage	25	22	72	67	Signed	Yes Yes^{3}
New York	April 2012	Domestic partnership (expansion)	—	—	129	10	—	No No
Colorado	May 2012	Civil union	23	12	—	—	—	No No
New Jersey	August 2012	Civil union and domestic partnership (expansion: surrogacy)	21	11	41	33	Vetoed	No No
Wyoming	January 2013	Domestic partnership	—	—	24	35	—	No No
Colorado	March 2013	Civil union	21	14	39	26	Signed	Yes Yes
Rhode Island	May 2013	Marriage	26	12	56	15	Signed	Yes Yes
Delaware	May 2013	Marriage	12	9	23	18	Signed	Yes Yes
Minnesota	May 2013	Marriage	37	30	75	59	Signed	Yes Yes
Nevada	June 2013	Domestic partnership (expansion)	21	0	41	0	Signed	Yes Yes
Hawaii	November 2013	Marriage	19	4	30	19	Signed	Yes Yes
Illinois	November 2013	Marriage	32	21	61	54	Signed	Yes Yes
New York	February 2014	Marriage (codification)	—	—	125	10	—	No No
Wyoming	February 2014	Marriage	—	—	17	41	—	No No
New York	April 2014	Domestic partnership (expansion)	—	—	124	14	—	No No
California	July 2014	Marriage (statutory codification)	25	10	51	11	Signed	Yes Yes
Virginia	February 2015	Marriage (statutory codification)	20	18	—	—	—	No No
Utah	March 2015	Marriage (partial statutory codification)	26	0	39	30	Signed	Yes Yes
New Mexico	April 2015	Marriage (partial codification)	35	5	37	10	Signed	Yes Yes
Nevada	June 2015	Domestic partnership (expansion)	21	0	42	0	Signed	Yes Yes
Nevada	June 2015	Domestic partnership (expansion)	19	0	41	1	Signed	Yes Yes
New Jersey	June 2015	Marriage, civil union and domestic partnership (expansion: surrogacy)	21	13	43	25	Vetoed	No No
Maine	June 2015	Marriage (expansion)	35	0	141	0	Vetoed^{1}	Yes Yes
Oregon	July 2015	Marriage (statutory codification)	18	11	40	18	Signed	Yes Yes
Guam	August 2015	Marriage (codification)	—N/a		13	2	—N/a^{4}	Yes Yes
New York	September 2015	Marriage (codification)	60	0	146	1	Signed	Yes Yes
District of Columbia	December 2015	Domestic partnership (expansion)	—N/a		Passed		Signed	Yes Yes
Oregon	March 2016	Marriage (statutory codification)	18	11	43	13	Signed	Yes Yes
New York	March 2016	Marriage (codification)	—	—	129	12	—	No No
New York	April 2016	Domestic partnership (expansion)	—	—	120	15	—	No No
Colorado	June 2016	Conversion of civil union into marriage	34	0	52	13	Signed	Yes Yes
North Carolina	June 2016	Marriage (partial statutory codification)	—	—	Passed		—	No No
California	July 2016	Marriage and domestic partnership (statutory codification)	34	0	63	1	Signed	Yes Yes
North Dakota	January 2017	Marriage (statutory codification)	15	31	—	—	—	No No
New Mexico	February 2017	Marriage (partial codification)	—	—	63	0	—	No No
Utah	March 2017	Marriage (partial statutory codification)	26	0	74	0	Signed	Yes Yes
Utah	March 2017	Marriage (partial statutory codification)	29	0	69	3	Signed	Yes Yes
Utah	March 2017	Marriage (partial statutory codification)	27	0	68	0	Signed	Yes Yes
Maryland	May 2017	Domestic partnership (expansion)	138	2	45	0	Signed	Yes Yes
Nevada	May 2017	Marriage (statutory codification)	20	1	28	10	Signed	Yes Yes
Nevada	June 2017	Domestic partnership (expansion)	21	0	41	0	Signed	Yes Yes
New York	June 2017	Marriage (codification)	62	0	139	0	Signed	Yes Yes
New Jersey	June 2017	Marriage, civil union and domestic partnership (expansion: surrogacy)	22	15	—	—	—	No No
North Carolina	July 2017	Marriage (partial statutory codification)	Passed		Passed		Signed	Yes Yes
Maine	July 2017	Marriage (codification)	Passed		Passed		—N/a^{4}	Yes Yes
Maryland	January 2018	Domestic partnership (expansion)	135	2	45	1	Vetoed	No No
New Mexico	February 2018	Marriage (partial codification)	—	—	60	2	—	No No
New York	March 2018	Marriage (codification)	—	—	129	6	—	No No
Utah	March 2018	Marriage (partial statutory codification)	27	0	70	0	Signed	Yes Yes
Utah	March 2018	Marriage (partial statutory codification)	23	0	73	0	Signed	Yes Yes
Utah	March 2018	Marriage (partial statutory codification)	23	4	44	24	Signed	Yes Yes
Utah	March 2018	Marriage (partial statutory codification)	25	3	45	26	Signed	Yes Yes
New York	April 2018	Domestic partnership (expansion)	—	—	114	17	—	No No
Minnesota	May 2018	Marriage (codification)	34	33	78	50	Vetoed	No No
New Jersey	May 2018	Marriage, civil union and domestic partnership (expansion: surrogacy)	Passed		Passed		Signed	Yes Yes
New York	June 2018	Marriage (codification)	57	4	—	—	—	No No
New Hampshire	June 2018	Marriage (equalization of marriageable age)	Passed		Passed		Signed	Yes Yes
Arkansas	March 2019	Marriage (partial statutory codification)	35	0	96	0	Signed	Yes Yes
Nebraska	March 2019	Marriage (partial statutory codification)	—N/a		38	6	Signed	Yes Yes
New Mexico	March 2019	Marriage (partial codification)	—	—	53	2	—	No No
Virginia	March 2019	Marriage (expansion: surrogacy)	28	12	63	36	Signed	Yes Yes
New Mexico	March 2019	Marriage (partial codification)	32	8	40	25	Signed	Yes Yes
Nebraska	March 2019	Marriage (partial statutory codification)	—N/a		45	0	Signed	Yes Yes
Utah	March 2019	Marriage (partial statutory codification)	22	2	55	6	Signed	Yes Yes
Utah	March 2019	Marriage (partial statutory codification)	29	0	69	4	Signed	Yes Yes
New Mexico	April 2019	Marriage (partial codification)	39	0	62	0	Signed	Yes Yes
Maryland	May 2019	Marriage (expansion)	34	10	121	15	Signed	Yes Yes
Maryland	May 2019	Marriage (expansion)	31	14	133	6	Signed	Yes Yes
Oklahoma	May 2019	Marriage (expansion: surrogacy)	33	10	84	6	Signed	Yes Yes
Nebraska	May 2019	Marriage (partial statutory codification)	—N/a		40	3	Signed	Yes Yes
Nebraska	May 2019	Marriage (partial statutory codification)	—N/a		33	8	Vetoed	No No
Minnesota	May 2019	Marriage (codification)	52	15	74	50	Signed	Yes Yes
Rhode Island	June 2019	Marriage (expansion)	35	0	—	—	—	No No
Maine	June 2019	Marriage (codification)	Passed		Passed		Signed	Yes Yes
Delaware	July 2019	Marriage (codification)	20	1	37	4	Signed	Yes Yes
New York	October 2019	Marriage (codification)	61	0	121	23	Signed	Yes Yes
Hawaii	December 2019	Marriage and civil union (codification)	—	—	Passed		—	No No
New York	December 2019	Domestic partnership (expansion)	59	0	122	24	Signed	Yes Yes
New Hampshire	January 2020	Marriage (codification)	—	—	Failed		—	No No
New Mexico	February 2020	Marriage (partial codification)	42	0	64	0	Signed	Yes Yes
Nebraska	February 2020	Marriage (partial statutory codification)	—N/a		47	0	Signed	Yes Yes
New Mexico	February 2020	Marriage (partial codification)	40	0	67	0	Signed	Yes Yes
Virginia	March 2020	Marriage (partial statutory codification)	28	12	63	34	Signed	Yes Yes
Virginia	March 2020	Marriage (partial statutory codification)	25	13	62	38	Signed	Yes Yes
Virginia	March 2020	Marriage (partial statutory codification)	33	6	58	42	Signed	Yes Yes
Utah	March 2020	Marriage (partial statutory codification)	24	1	70	0	Signed	Yes Yes
Utah	March 2020	Marriage (partial statutory codification)	27	0	71	0	Signed	Yes Yes
Virginia	April 2020	Marriage (partial statutory codification)	39	1	91	6	Signed	Yes Yes
New York	April 2020	Marriage (expansion)	Passed		Passed		Signed	Yes Yes
Virginia	April 2020	Marriage (statutory codification)	24	16	53	43	Signed	Yes Yes
New York	April 2020	Domestic partnership (expansion)	62	0	131	11	Signed	Yes Yes
Puerto Rico	June 2020	Marriage (codification)	Passed		Passed		Signed	Yes Yes
North Carolina	June 2020	Marriage (partial statutory codification)	47	0	Passed		Signed	Yes Yes
New Hampshire	July 2020	Marriage (codification)	Passed		209	119	Signed	Yes Yes
Rhode Island	July 2020	Marriage (expansion)	34	1	64	1	Signed	Yes Yes
Rhode Island	July 2020	Marriage (expansion)	36	1	67	1	Signed	Yes Yes
North Carolina	2023	Marriage (partial statutory codification)	50	0	Failed		—	No No
Virginia	2024	Marriage (statutory codification)	22	17	54	40	Signed	Yes Yes
Kansas	April 2024	Marriage (statutory codification)	Failed		43	61	—	No No
Pennsylvania	July 2024	Marriage (codification)	Failed		133	68	—	No No
Missouri	February 2025	Marriage (statutory codification)	6	19	Failed		—	No No
Colorado	March 2025	Marriage (codification)	29	6	45	14	Signed	Yes Yes
Pennsylvania	2026	Marriage (codification)	Pending		127	72	—	—

Notes:

- ^{1}Veto overridden
- ^{2}People's veto (Maine Question 1, 2009)
- ^{3}People's veto failed (Washington Referendum 71, Washington Referendum 74, Maryland Question 6)
- ^{4}The bill was allowed to lapse into law.

=== Efforts to prohibit same-sex unions ===
Votes by state legislatures to prohibit recognition of various types of same-sex unions, sorted by date:

State	Date	Type of same-sex union	Upper house		Lower house		Governor	Final outcome^{1}
State	Date	Type of same-sex union	Yes	No	Yes	No	Governor	Final outcome^{1}
Maryland	May 1973	Marriage	Passed		Passed		Signed	Yes Yes^{2}
Texas	June 1973	Marriage	30	1	113	17	Signed	Yes Yes
Oklahoma	February 1975	Marriage	Passed		Passed		Signed	Yes Yes
Arizona	April 1975	Marriage	Passed		Passed		Signed	Yes Yes
Virginia	August 1975	Marriage	Passed		Passed		Signed	Yes Yes^{2}
Utah	April 1977	Marriage	Passed		Passed		Signed	Yes Yes
Florida	June 1977	Marriage	37	0	101	11	Signed	Yes Yes
Illinois	June 1977	Marriage	Passed		Passed		Signed	Yes Yes^{2}
California	August 1977	Marriage	23	5	68	2	Signed	Yes Yes^{2}
Wyoming	October 1977	Marriage	Passed		Passed		Signed	Yes Yes
Wisconsin	July 1979	Marriage	Passed		Passed		Signed	Yes Yes
New Hampshire	July 1987	Marriage	Passed		Passed		Signed	Yes Yes^{2}
Louisiana	1987	Marriage	Passed		Passed		Signed	Yes Yes
New Hampshire	March 1994	Recognition of out-of-state marriage	11	12	—	—	—	No No
Guam	May 1994	Marriage	—N/a		Passed		Signed	Yes Yes^{2}
Hawaii	June 1994	Marriage	Passed		Passed		Signed	Yes Yes^{2}
Utah	March 1995	Recognition of out-of-state marriage	Passed		Passed		Signed	Yes Yes
South Dakota	January 1996	Marriage	26	8	49	18	Signed	Yes Yes
Idaho	February 1996	Marriage	24	6	66	4	Signed	Yes Yes
Idaho	March 1996	Recognition of out-of-state marriage	28	4	59	6	Signed	Yes Yes
Colorado	March 1996	Marriage	Passed		Passed		Vetoed	No No
Kansas	April 1996	Marriage	39	1	87	38	Signed	Yes Yes
Georgia	April 1996	Marriage	47	0	135	10	Signed	Yes Yes
Arizona	May 1996	Marriage	21	9	50	5	Signed	Yes Yes
Alaska	May 1996	Marriage and civil union	16	3	31	9	—N/a^{3}	Yes Yes
Illinois	May 1996	Marriage	42	9	87	17	Signed	Yes Yes^{2}
Tennessee	May 1996	Marriage	31	0	90	1	Signed	Yes Yes
South Carolina	May 1996	Marriage	45	0	82	0	Signed	Yes Yes
Michigan	June 1996	Marriage	31	2	88	14	Signed	Yes Yes
Michigan	June 1996	Recognition of out-of-state marriage	32	2	74	28	Signed	Yes Yes
Delaware	June 1996	Marriage	17	3	39	0	Signed	Yes Yes^{2}
North Carolina	June 1996	Marriage and recognition of out-of-state marriage	41	4	98	10	Signed	Yes Yes
Missouri	July 1996	Marriage	29	2	131	10	Signed	Yes Yes
California	August 1996	Marriage	20	21	Passed		—	No No
Oklahoma	September 1996	Marriage	42	2	99	0	Signed	Yes Yes
Pennsylvania	October 1996	Marriage	43	5	189	13	Signed	Yes Yes
Mississippi	February 1997	Marriage	50	0	118	3	Signed	Yes Yes
Arkansas	February 1997	Marriage	34	0	92	2	Signed	Yes Yes
North Dakota	February 1997	Marriage	43	6	73	18	Signed	Yes Yes
Texas	February 1997	Marriage	31	0	143	0	Signed	Yes Yes
Washington	February 1997	Marriage	33	15	63	35	Vetoed	No No
Virginia	March 1997	Recognition of out-of-state marriage	40	0	87	9	Signed	Yes Yes^{2}
Maine	March 1997	Marriage	24	10	106	39	—N/a^{3}	Yes Yes^{2}
Indiana	April 1997	Marriage	38	10	85	9	Signed	Yes Yes
Montana	April 1997	Marriage and civil union	45	5	73	23	Signed	Yes Yes
Florida	May 1997	Recognition of out-of-state marriage	33	5	97	19	—N/a^{3}	Yes Yes
Minnesota	June 1997	Marriage	64	0	108	20	Signed	Yes Yes^{2}
Colorado	June 1997	Marriage	Passed		Passed		Vetoed	No No
Washington	February 1998	Marriage	34	11	65	28	Vetoed ^{4}	Yes Yes^{2}
Kentucky	April 1998	Marriage and recognition out-of-state marriage	32	2	84	9	Signed	Yes Yes
Alabama	May 1998	Marriage	30	0	79	12	Signed	Yes Yes
Hawaii	November 1998	Marriage	Passed		Passed		Signed	Yes Yes^{2}
Puerto Rico	March 1999	Marriage	Passed		Passed		Signed	Yes Yes
Louisiana	July 1999	Marriage and recognition of out-of-state marriage	32	0	95	0	Signed	Yes Yes
West Virginia	March 2000	Marriage	Passed		96	3	Signed	Yes Yes
New Hampshire	March 2000	Recognition of out-of-state marriage	—	—	128	232	—	No No
Vermont	April 2000	Marriage	19	11	79	68	Signed	Yes Yes
Connecticut	April / May 2000	Marriage	31	5	96	51	Signed	Yes Yes
Colorado	May 2000	Marriage	33	32	37	28	Signed	Yes Yes
New Hampshire	March 2001	Recognition of out-of-state civil union	—	—	88	276	—	No No
Missouri	July 2001	Marriage	31	0	124	20	Signed	Yes Yes
American Samoa	March 2003	Marriage	Failed		—	—	—	No No
Texas	May 2003	Recognition of out-of-state same-sex marriage and civil union	22	9	118	9	Signed	Yes Yes
Wisconsin	November 2003	Marriage	22	10	68	29	Vetoed	No No
Ohio	February 2004	Marriage, recognition of out-of-state marriage, and civil union	18	15	72	22	Signed	Yes Yes
Utah	March 2004	Civil union	24	4	62	12	Signed	Yes Yes
Virginia	April 2004	Civil union	27	12	69	30	—N/a^{3}	Yes Yes^{2}
New Hampshire	May 2004	Recognition of out-of-state marriage	16	7	215	137	Signed	Yes Yes^{2}
Connecticut	April 2005	Marriage	27	9	85	63	Signed	Yes Yes
Wyoming	February 2007	Recognition of out-of-state marriage	21	8	—	—	—	No No
New Hampshire	March 2009	Civil union	—	—	136	205	—	No No
New Hampshire	February 2010	Marriage	—	—	109	210	—	No No
Wyoming	March 2011	Recognition of out-of-state marriage	14	16	31	28	—	No No
New Hampshire	March 2012	Marriage	—	—	116	211	—	No No
Wyoming	February 2014	Recognition of out-of-state marriage	—	—	29	31	—	No No
Tennessee	January 2016	Marriage (repeal by Natural Marriage Defense Act)	—	—	Failed		—	No No
North Carolina	April 2017	Marriage (repeal by the Uphold Historical Marriage Act).	—	—	Failed		—	No No
South Carolina	March 2018	Marriage (repeal by declaring same-sex marriage as parodical marriages)	—	—	Failed		—	No No
Iowa	January 2023	Marriage (declares Respect for Marriage Act inapplicable in Iowa)	—	—	Failed		—	No No
Idaho	January 2023	Marriage (declares "there would only be marriage recognized between a man and a woman").	—	—	Failed		—	No No
Indiana	January 2024	Marriage and recognition of foreign marriages.	—	—	Failed		—	No No
Tennessee	2026	Marriage (Asserts private citizens and organizations in the state are not bound by the Fourteenth Amendment or by the Supreme Court’s 2015 decision in Obergefell v. Hodges when it comes to recognizing the marriages of same-sex couples)	Pending		68	24		

Notes:

- ^{1} On June 26, 2015, the Supreme Court of the United States ruled in the case of Obergefell v. Hodges that a fundamental right to marry is guaranteed to same-sex couples by the Fourteenth Amendment, and that states must allow same-sex marriage.
- ^{2} Subsequently, repealed.
- ^{3} The bill was allowed to lapse into law.
- ^{4} Veto overridden.

=== Proposed resolutions calling on the U.S. Congress to pass a federal constitutional amendment or law banning same-sex marriage ===
State	Date	Type of same-sex union	Upper house		Lower house		Governor	Final outcome^{1}
State	Date	Type of same-sex union	Yes	No	Yes	No	Governor	Final outcome^{1}
Arkansas	March 2017	Marriage	18	9	29	41		No No

=== Proposed memorials requesting to Supreme Court the reversal of Obergefell ===
Votes by state legislatures calling to reverse Obergefell, sorted by date:

State	Date	Type of same-sex union	Upper house		Lower house		Governor	Final outcome^{1}
State	Date	Type of same-sex union	Yes	No	Yes	No	Governor	Final outcome^{1}
Tennessee	2016	Marriage	Failed		73	18		No No
South Dakota	February 2025	Marriage			Failed			No No
North Dakota	March 2025	Marriage	16	31	52	40		No No
Montana	March 2025	Marriage			Failed			No No
Idaho	2025	Marriage	Failed		46	24		No No
Oklahoma	2025	Marriage	Failed					No No
Iowa	2025	Marriage	Failed					No No
Michigan	2025	Marriage			Failed			No No
South Carolina	2026	Marriage (overturn by SCOTUS and state repeal)			Pending			
Idaho	2026	Marriage			44	26		

=== Attempts to establish same-sex unions via initiative or statewide referendum ===
State	Intended date	Same-sex union	Description	Outcome
Maine	November 2012	Marriage	Initiative to establish same-sex marriage.	Yes Yes

=== Efforts to enable ban amendment ===
State	Date	Type of same-sex union	State senate				Lower house				% of legislative vote required	Final outcome
State	Date	Type of same-sex union	Yes		No		Yes		No		% of legislative vote required	Final outcome
State	Date	Type of same-sex union	Vote	%	Vote	%	Vote	%	Vote	%	% of legislative vote required	Final outcome
Hawaii	1997	Marriage ban permitted	Passed								66.67%	Advanced
Hawaii	1998	Marriage ban permitted	Passed								50.01%	Yes Constitutional Amendment 2 placed on the ballot
Alaska	May 12, 1998	Same-sex marriage	14	70%	6	30%	28	70%	12	30%	66.67%	Yes Measure 2 placed on the ballot
Indiana	February 3, 2004	Same-sex marriage	42	84%	7	14%	—				50.01%	No Died in committee
Georgia	February 16, 2004 February 26, 2004 March 31, 2004	Same-sex marriage and civil unions	40	71.43%	14	25%	117	65%	50	27.78%	66.67%	Yes Constitutional Amendment 1 placed on the ballot
Georgia	February 16, 2004 February 26, 2004 March 31, 2004	Same-sex marriage and civil unions	40	71.43%	14	25%	122	67.78%	52	28.89%	66.67%	Yes Constitutional Amendment 1 placed on the ballot
Mississippi	March 1, 2004 April 7, 2004	Same-sex marriage	51	98.08%	0	0%	97	79.51%	17	13.93%	66.67%	Yes Amendment 1 placed on the ballot
Missouri	March 1, 2004 May 14, 2004	Same-sex marriage	26	76.47%	6	17.65%	130	79.75%	26	15.95%	50.01%	Yes Constitutional Amendment 2 placed on ballot
Wisconsin	March 3, 2004 March 11, 2004	Same-sex marriage and civil unions	20	60.61%	13	39.39%	68	68.69%	27	27.27%	50.01%	Advanced
Wisconsin	December 6, 2005 February 28, 2006	Same-sex marriage and civil unions	19	57.56%	14	42.42%	62	62.63%	31	31.31%	50.01%	Yes Referendum 1 placed on ballot
Utah	March 3, 2004	Same-sex marriage and civil unions	20	68.97%	7	24.14%	58	77.33%	14	18.67%	66.67%	Yes Constitutional Amendment 3 placed on ballot
Kansas	March 5, 2004 March 25, 2004	Same-sex marriage and civil unions	—				88	70.4%	36	28.8%	66.67%	No Bill was amended
Kansas	March 25, 2004	Same-sex marriage	17	42.5%	16	40%	—				66.67%	No Rejected
Kentucky	April 12, 2004 April 13, 2004	Same-sex marriage and civil unions	33	86.84%	5	13.16%	85	85%	11	11%	60%	Yes Constitutional Amendment 1 placed on ballot
Oklahoma	April 15, 2004 April 22, 2004	Same-sex marriage and civil unions	26	54.17%	19	39.58%	92	91.09%	4	3.96%	50.01%	Yes State Question 711 placed on ballot
Kansas	May 1, 2004 May 4, 2004	Same-sex marriage and civil unions	27	67.5%	13	32.5%	79	63.2%	45	36%	66.67%	No Rejected
Tennessee	May 6, 2004 May 19, 2004	Same-sex marriage	28	84.85%	1	3.03%	85	85.86%	5	5.05%	50.01%	Advanced
Tennessee	February 28, 2005 March 17, 2005	Same-sex marriage	29	87.88%	3	9.09%	88	88.89%	7	7.07%	66.67%	Yes Constitutional Amendment 1 placed on ballot
Louisiana	June 6, 2004 June 15, 2004	Same-sex marriage and civil unions	31	79.49%	6	15.38%	88	83.81%	13	12.38%	66.67%	Yes Constitutional Amendment 1 placed on ballot
Kansas	January 13, 2005 February 2, 2005	Same-sex marriage and civil unions	28	70%	11	27.5%	86	68.8%	37	29.6%	66.67%	Yes Amendment 1 placed on ballot
South Dakota	February 3, 2005 February 28, 2005	Same-sex marriage and civil unions	20	57.14%	14	40%	55	78.57%	14	20%	50.01%	Yes Amendment C placed on ballot
Virginia	February 26, 2005	All types of same-sex unions	30	75%	10	25%	79	79%	17	17%	50.01%	Advanced
Virginia	January 15, 2006 March 7, 2006	All types of same-sex unions	28	70%	11	27.5%	85	85%	12	12%	50.01%	Yes Question 1 placed on ballot
South Carolina	March 1, 2005 April 14, 2005	Same-sex marriage and civil unions	42	91.3%	1	2.17%	96	77.42%	3	2.42%	66.67%	Yes Amendment 1 placed on ballot
South Carolina	January 25, 2007 February 27, 2007	Same-sex marriage and civil unions	41	89.13%	1	2.17%	92	74.19%	7	5.65%	66.67%	Yes Amendment 1 ratified
Alabama	March 8, 2005 March 10, 2005	Same-sex marriage and civil unions	30	85.71%	0	0%	85	80.95%	7	6.67%	60%	Yes Amendment 774 placed on ballot
Texas	April 25, 2005 May 21, 2005	Same-sex marriage and civil unions	21	67.74%	8	25.81%	101	67.33%	29	19.33%	66.67%	Yes Proposition 2 placed on ballot
Idaho	February 6, 2006 February 15, 2006	Same-sex marriage and civil unions	26	74.29%	9	25.71%	53	75.71%	17	24.29%	66.67%	Yes Constitutional Amendment 2 placed on ballot
Pennsylvania	June 6, 2006	Same-sex marriage and civil unions	—				136	66.97%	61	30.05%	66.67%	No Died in committee
Pennsylvania	June 21, 2006	Same-sex marriage	38	76%	12	24%	—				66.67%	No Died in committee
Arizona	May 12, 2008 June 27, 2008	Same-sex marriage	16	53.33%	4	13.33%	35	55%	25	41.67%	50.01%	Yes Proposition 102 placed on ballot
Wyoming	February 6, 2009	Same-sex marriage	—				25	40.32%	35	56.45%	66.67%	No Died in committee
West Virginia	March 30, 2009	Same-sex marriage	—				30	30%	67	67%	66.67%	No Died in committee
Indiana	January 28, 2010	Same-sex marriage and civil unions	38	76%	10	20%	—				50.01%	No Died in committee
New Hampshire	February 17, 2010	Same-sex marriage	—				135	33.75%	201	50.25%	60%	No Died in committee
Wyoming	January 27, 2011	Same-sex marriage	20	64.52%	10	32.26%	—				66.67%	No Died in committee
Iowa	February 1, 2011	Same-sex marriage	—				62	62%	37	37%	50.01%	No Died in committee
Indiana	February 15, 2011 March 29, 2011	Same-sex marriage and civil unions	40	80%	10	20%	70	70%	26	26%	50.01%	No Advanced, but bill was amended
Indiana	January 28, 2014 February 17, 2014	Same-sex marriage	32	64%	17	34%	57	57%	40	40%	50.01%	Advanced
Indiana	2015/2016	Same-sex marriage	—								50.01%	No Not reintroduced in General Assembly
Minnesota	May 11, 2011 May 21, 2011	Same-sex marriage	37	55.22%	27	40.3%	70	52.24%	62	46.27%	50.01%	Yes Constitutional Amendment 1 placed on ballot
North Carolina	September 12, 2011 September 13, 2011	Same-sex marriage and civil unions	30	60%	16	32%	75	62.5%	42	35%	60%	Yes Constitutional Amendment 1 placed on ballot

=== Efforts to ban same-sex unions by constitutional amendment ===
The following table shows all popular vote results regarding state constitutional amendments concerning same-sex marriage, and in some cases civil unions and domestic partnerships. The Hawaii amendment is different in that it granted the legislature authority to "reserve marriage to opposite-sex couples" (which the legislature had already done).

State	Initiated or legislatively referred ballot measure	Ban on	Date	Yes Yes vote		No No vote		Total votes	Voter turnout	Electorate	Final outcome
State	Initiated or legislatively referred ballot measure	Ban on	Date	Votes	%	Votes	%	Total votes	Voter turnout	Electorate	Final outcome
Alaska	Measure 2	Marriage	November 3, 1998	152,965	68.11%	71,631	31.89%	224,596	49.54%	453,332	Yes Yes
Hawaii	Constitutional Amendment 2	Marriage ban permitted	November 3, 1998	285,384	69.18%	117,827	28.56%	412,520	67.19%	601,404	Yes Yes
Nebraska	Initiative Measure 416	All types of same-sex unions	November 7, 2000	477,571	70.1%	203,667	29.9%	681,238	62.77%	1,085,217	Yes Yes
Nevada	Ballot Question 2	Marriage	November 7, 2000	412,688	69.62%	180,077	30.38%	592,765	67.8%	874,304	Yes Yes
Nevada	Ballot Question 2	Marriage	November 5, 2002	337,197	67.2%	164,573	32.8%	501,770	57.68%	869,859	Yes Yes
Missouri	Constitutional Amendment 2	Marriage	August 3, 2004	1,055,771	70.61%	439,529	29.39%	1,495,300	42.93%	3,483,481	Yes Yes
Louisiana	Constitutional Amendment 1	Marriage and civil union	September 18, 2004	619,908	77.78%	177,067	22.22%	796,975	27.91%	2,855,561	Yes Yes
Kentucky	Constitutional Amendment 1	Marriage and civil union	November 2, 2004	1,222,125	74.56%	417,097	25.44%	1,639,222	58.7%	2,794,286	Yes Yes
Georgia	Constitutional Amendment 1	Marriage and civil union	November 2, 2004	2,454,930	76.15%	768,716	23.85%	3,223,646	75.87%	4,248,837	Yes Yes
Ohio	State Issue 1	Marriage and civil union	November 2, 2004	3,329,335	61.71%	2,065,462	38.29%	5,394,797	67.66%	7,972,826	Yes Yes
Mississippi	Amendment 1	Marriage	November 2, 2004	957,104	86.01%	155,648	13.99%	1,112,752	53.78%	2,068,766	Yes Yes
Oklahoma	State Question 711	Marriage and civil union	November 2, 2004	1,075,216	75.59%	347,303	24.41%	1,422,519	66.35%	2,143,978	Yes Yes
Arkansas	Constitutional Amendment 3	Marriage and civil union	November 2, 2004	753,770	74.95%	251,914	25.05%	1,053,399	62.47%	1,686,124	Yes Yes
Michigan	State Proposal - 04-2	All types of same-sex unions	November 2, 2004	2,698,077	58.62%	1,904,319	41.38%	4,602,396	64.24%	7,164,047	Yes Yes
Montana	Constitutional Initiative 96	Marriage	November 2, 2004	295,070	66.56%	148,263	33.44%	443,333	69.44%	638,474	Yes Yes
Utah	Constitutional Amendment 3	Marriage and civil union	November 2, 2004	593,297	65.86%	307,488	34.14%	900,785	70.47%	1,278,251	Yes Yes
North Dakota	Constitutional Measure 1	Marriage and civil union	November 2, 2004	223,538	73.23%	81,708	26.77%	305,246	62.68%	487,010	Yes Yes
Oregon	State Measure 36	Marriage	November 2, 2004	1,028,546	56.63%	787,556	43.37%	1,816,102	84.82%	2,141,249	Yes Yes
Kansas	Amendment 1	Marriage and civil union	April 5, 2005	417,627	69.95%	179,432	30.05%	597,059	35.35%	1,688,926	Yes Yes
Texas	Proposition 2	Marriage and civil union	November 8, 2005	1,723,782	76.25%	536,913	23.75%	2,260,695	17.97%	12,577,545	Yes Yes
Alabama	Amendment 774	Marriage and civil union	June 6, 2006	697,591	81.18%	161,694	18.82%	859,285	35.61%	2,413,279	Yes Yes
South Carolina	Amendment 1	Marriage and civil union	November 7, 2006	829,360	77.97%	234,316	22.03%	1,063,676	43.37%	2,452,714	Yes Yes
Virginia	Question 1	All types of same-sex unions	November 7, 2006	1,328,537	57.06%	999,687	42.94%	2,328,224	51.12%	4,554,683	Yes Yes
Tennessee	Constitutional Amendment 1	Marriage	November 7, 2006	1,419,434	81.25%	327,536	18.75%	1,746,970	46.73%	3,738,703	Yes Yes
Wisconsin	Referendum 1	Marriage and civil union	November 7, 2006	1,264,310	59.43%	862,924	40.57%	2,127,234	49.97%	4,256,721	Yes Yes
South Dakota	Amendment C	All types of same-sex unions	November 7, 2006	172,305	51.83%	160,152	48.17%	332,457	65.56%	507,132	Yes Yes
Colorado	Amendment 43	Marriage	November 7, 2006	855,206	55.02%	699,030	44.98%	1,554,236	62.6%	2,533,058	Yes Yes
Arizona	Proposition 107	Marriage and civil union	November 7, 2006	721,789	48.21%	775,498	51.79%	1,496,987	58.28%	2,568,401	No No
Idaho	Constitutional Amendment 2	Marriage and civil union	November 7, 2006	282,386	63.35%	163,384	36.65%	445,770	58.27%	764,880	Yes Yes
Florida	Constitutional Amendment 2	Marriage and civil union	November 4, 2008	4,890,883	61.92%	3,008,026	38.08%	8,456,329	75.18%	11,247,634	Yes Yes
Arizona	Proposition 102	Marriage	November 4, 2008	1,258,355	56.2%	980,753	43.8%	2,239,078	74.95%	2,987,451	Yes Yes
California	Proposition 8	Marriage	November 4, 2008	7,001,084	52.24%	6,401,482	47.76%	13,743,177	79.42%	17,304,091	Yes Yes
North Carolina	Constitutional Amendment 1	Marriage and civil union	May 8, 2012	1,317,178	61.04%	840,802	38.96%	2,157,980	34.27%	6,296,759	Yes Yes
Minnesota	Constitutional Amendment 1	Marriage	November 6, 2012	1,399,916	47.44%	1,510,434	51.19%	2,950,780	76.42%	3,861,043	No No

=== Post-Obergefell attempts to repeal constitutional amendments banning same-sex unions ===
State	Date	Type of same-sex union	Upper house		Lower house		Final outcome
State	Date	Type of same-sex union	Yes	No	Yes	No	Final outcome
Nevada	2017	Same-sex marriage	19	2	27	14	Advanced
Nevada	March/May 2019	Same-sex marriage	19	2	37	2	Placed on Ballot
Nevada	November 2020	Same-sex marriage	Referendum (62.4%)				Yes Yes
Virginia	February 2021	Same-sex marriage, civil union and any marriage-like contract between unmarried persons	24	12	60	33	Advanced
Virginia	2022	Same-sex marriage, civil union and any marriage-like contract between unmarried persons	25	14	-	-	No
California	2023	Same-sex marriage	31	0	67	0	Placed on Ballot
California	2023	Same-sex marriage	Referendum (62.62%)				Yes Yes
California	November 2024	Same-sex marriage	Referendum (62.62%)				Yes Yes
Hawaii	March/April 2024	Legislative authority to enact same-sex marriage ban	24	1	43	6	Placed on Ballot
Hawaii	November 2024	Legislative authority to enact same-sex marriage ban	Referendum (55.94%)				Yes Yes
Colorado	April/May 2024	Same-sex marriage	29	5	46	14	Placed on Ballot
Colorado	November 2024	Same-sex marriage	Referendum (64.33%)				Yes Yes
Virginia	January 2025	Same-sex marriage, civil union and any marriage-like contract between unmarried persons	24	15	58	35	Advanced
Virginia	January 2026	Same-sex marriage, civil union and any marriage-like contract between unmarried persons	26	13	67	31	Placed on Ballot
Virginia	November 2026	Same-sex marriage, civil union and any marriage-like contract between unmarried persons	Referendum Pending				Pending

=== Constitutional codification of same-sex unions in states that did not have a constitutional ban on such unions ===
State	Date	Type of same-sex union	Upper house		Lower house		Final outcome
State	Date	Type of same-sex union	Yes	No	Yes	No	Final outcome
New York	2022	Same-sex marriage (implicit protection by Equal Protection of Laws)	49	14	95	45	Advanced
New York	2023	Same-sex marriage (implicit protection by Equal Protection of Laws)	43	20	97	46	Placed on Ballot
New York	November 2024	Same-sex marriage (implicit protection by Equal Protection of Laws)	Referendum (62.47%)				Yes Yes
Delaware	2025	Same-sex marriage	16	5	28	3	Advanced
Delaware	Pending	Same-sex marriage	Pending		Pending		Pending
Vermont	2024	Same-sex marriage (implicit protection by Equal Protection of Laws)	28	0	141	4	Advanced
Vermont	2026	Same-sex marriage (implicit protection by Equal Protection of Laws)	29	0	128	14	Placed on Ballot
Vermont	November 2026	Same-sex marriage (implicit protection by Equal Protection of Laws)	Referendum Pending				

=== Proposed attempts to constitutionally block same-sex unions ===
State	2000s	2010s	Details	
Delaware	2009		A proposed constitutional amendment, Senate Bill 27, to ban same-sex marriage failed.	Failed
Indiana	2004; 2005; 2006; 2007; 2008; 2009	2010; 2011 2014	On February 15, 2011, the Indiana House approved a ban on civil unions and marriage (70–26). The bill passed the Indiana Senate by a 40–10 vote. According to state law, the bill must now be approved by the next, separately elected legislature before voters will see the measure on the 2014 ballot. On January 27, 2014, the Indiana House voted 52–43 to remove the ban on civil unions from the proposed measure. On January 28, 2014, the Indiana House voted 57–40 in favor of the amended measure. On February 17, 2014, the Indiana Senate voted 32–17 approving the House-amended version of the ban on gay marriage. The measure will now need to be approved by the next, separately elected legislature before voters are allowed to decide its fate in 2016.	Failed
Iowa	2004; 2005	2010; 2011	After the Iowa Supreme Court made same-sex marriage legal in 2009, a backlash quickly developed that resulted in three of the justices losing their seats in the 2010 election. Additionally, Republicans took control of the House and fell one seat short of taking over the Senate. For a proposed constitutional amendment to come before Iowa voters, it has to be approved in exactly the same form by two consecutive general assemblies.	Failed
Minnesota	2004; 2005; 2006; 2007; 2009	2011	A bill was sponsored in 2009 but failed to be brought up for a vote. An amendment was introduced again in 2011. The House and Senate bills passed. Both are referred to other area. The bill would have been approved by majority by both the Senate and house by May 23, 2011. On May 11, 2011, the Senate passed the bill 38–27. On May 22, 2011, an amendment was passed in the house by a vote of 70–62, and was placed on the ballot in the November 2012 election.	Failed
New Hampshire	2006; 2007	2010	On February 17, 2010, a proposed constitutional amendment failed in the house by a 201–135 margin. Constitutional amendments in New Hampshire require two-thirds approval from voters.	Failed
New Jersey	2006; 2007; 2008	2010	Bills to place an amendment on the ballot have all failed in the House or Senate Judiciary Committee.	Failed
New Mexico	2007; 2008; 2009	2010; 2011; 2013 2014	A joint resolution was prefiled in the New Mexico legislature for the 2014 session. The resolution would define marriage as one man and one woman for the state of New Mexico.	Failed
Pennsylvania	2006; 2008; 2009	2010; 2011; 2013	A joint resolution was introduced in the house of representatives with record low sponsorship on May 8, 2013. The bill would ban same-sex marriages and civil unions. Pennsylvania would become the first northeastern state with a marriage amendment. According to state law, the amendment must receive a majority vote from both chambers of the legislature in two consecutive sessions before voters are allowed to decide its fate. The soonest voters could see the measure is in 2015.	Failed
West Virginia	2009	2010; 2011	West Virginia senators proposed a constitutional amendment for the 2010 ballot that would have defined marriage as "a union between and man and a woman". The amendment was defeated. Another proposition was introduced in January 2011 but failed to advance.	Failed
Wyoming	2009	2011	In 2009, the house of representatives considered an amendment to the state constitution, House Joint Resolution 17 (also known as the "Defense of Marriage" resolution), defining marriage as a union between a man and a woman. The measure was defeated in the house on February 6, with 35 votes against and 25 in favor. On January 27, 2011, the Senate approved an amendment, but it died in the house.	Failed

=== Efforts to ban same-sex unions by statute ===
The following consists of votes by statutory initiatives that ban same-sex marriage and/or civil unions and domestic partnerships:

State	Date	Yes Yes vote	No No vote	Description	Final outcome
California	March 2000	61% (4,618,673)	39% (2,909,370)	Proposition 22. Amend the Family Code to say: Only marriage between a man and a woman is valid or recognized in California.^{1}	Yes^{2} ^{3}

Notes:

- ^{1} There is a debate as to whether the adoption of Prop 22 only prohibited California from recognizing same-sex marriages performed in other states.
- ^{2} In March 2005, Judge Richard Kramer ruled there appeared to be no rational state compelling interest in limiting marriage to heterosexual couples. His ruling was appealed to the California Court of Appeal for the 1st District, which upheld Proposition 22 on October 5, 2006. The Supreme Court of California ruled on May 15, 2008, that Proposition 22 is unconstitutional and it was struck down by the state's highest court.
- ^{3} Subsequently, repealed by state legislature.

=== Lawsuits seeking to overturn statutory bans ===
The following lists cases seeking to overturn marriage bans:

State	Case	Date	Vote for	Vote against	Description	Restrictions unconstitutional?	Final outcome
Minnesota	Richard John Baker v. Gerald R. Nelson	October 15, 1971	0	7	Minnesota Supreme Court ruled that Minnesota's marriage statute applied only to opposite-sex couples. The case was appealed to the United States Supreme Court, but dismissed on October 10, 1972.	No	No
Kentucky	Jones v. Callahan	November 9, 1973	0	7	Kentucky Court of Appeals ruled that Kentucky's marriage statute applied only to opposite-sex couples.	No No	No No
Washington	Singer v. Hara	October 1974	Failed		Washington Supreme Court refused to hear an appeal of same-sex couple who were denied a marriage license by their county clerk. Washington Court of Appeals's decision stating that state marriage statutes only applied to opposite-sex couples upheld.	No No	No No
District of Columbia	Dean v. District of Columbia	January 1995	0	9	District of Columbia Court of Appeals ruled that District's marriage statute applied only to opposite-sex couples.	No No	No No
Hawaii	Baehr v. Miike	December 9, 1999	0	5	Hawaii Supreme Court ruled on May 5, 1993, in a 3 in favor to 1 against decision, that state must provide a compelling interest to restricting marriage to opposite-sex couples. Remanded case to lower courts for trial on the subject. On December 3, 1996, Judge Chang ruled that the state had not established any compelling interest in denying same-sex couples the ability to marry and that, even if it had, it failed to prove that the Hawaii statute was narrowly tailored to avoid unnecessary abridgement of constitutional rights. He enjoined the state from refusing to issue marriage licenses to otherwise-qualified same-sex couples. The following day Chang stayed his ruling, acknowledging the "legally untenable" position couples would be in should the Supreme Court reverse him on appeal. Hawaii Supreme Court ruled that plaintiffs' arguments were moot in light of 1998 state constitutional amendment.	No No	No No
Vermont	Baker v. Vermont	December 20, 1999	5	0	Vermont Supreme Court rules that same-sex marriage or something similar must be implemented in 100 days.	Yes Yes	Yes Legalized civil unions in Vermont by Vermont General Assembly
Alaska	Brause v. Alaska Dept of Health & Social Services	April 17, 2001	0	5	Alaska Supreme Court ruled that plaintiffs' arguments were moot in light of 1998 state constitutional amendment.	No No	No No
Massachusetts	Goodridge v. Department of Public Health	November 18, 2003	4	3	Massachusetts Supreme Judicial Court rules that same-sex marriages must be legal in 180 days.	Yes Yes	Yes Legalized same-sex marriage in Massachusetts on May 17, 2004
Arizona	Harold Donald Standhardt and Tod Alan Keltner v. State of Arizona	May 25, 2004	Failed		Arizona Supreme Court refused to hear an appeal of a unanimous Arizona Appellate Court ruling upholding statutory marriage ban.	No	No
Louisiana	Forum for Equality v McKeithen	January 19, 2005	0	7	District Judge William Morvant of Baton Rouge struck down the constitutional amendment on the grounds that it violated a provision of the state constitution requiring that an amendment cover only one subject. The Louisiana Supreme Court, however, upheld the constitutional amendment.	No	No
Oregon	Mary Li and Rebecca Kennedy et al. v. State of Oregon et al.	April 2005	0	7	Oregon Supreme Court ruled that plaintiffs' arguments were moot in light of 2004 state constitutional amendment banning same-sex marriage.	No	No
New York	Hernandez v. Robles	July 6, 2006	2	4	New York Court of Appeals upheld New York's marriage statute did not allow same-sex marriage, and that there is no constitutional right to same-sex marriage.	No	No
Georgia	Perdue v. O'Kelley	July 7, 2006	0	7	On May 16, 2006, Constance C. Russell of Fulton County Superior Court struck down the constitutional amendment on the grounds that it violated a provision of the state constitution requiring that an amendment cover only one subject. The Georgia Supreme Court, however, upheld the constitutional amendment.	No	No
Washington	Andersen v. King County	July 26, 2006	4	5	Washington Supreme Court upholds Washington's statute banning same-sex marriage.	No	No
New Jersey	Lewis v. Harris	October 25, 2006	7	0	New Jersey Supreme Court rules that same-sex marriage or something similar must be implemented in 100 days.	Yes Yes	Yes Legalized civil unions in New Jersey by New Jersey General Assembly
Maryland	Conaway v. Deane & Polyak	September 2007	3	4	Maryland Court of Appeals upholds Maryland's statute banning same-sex marriage.	No	No
Michigan	Pride at Work v. Granholm	May 7, 2008	5	2	Michigan Supreme Court ruled that Michigan's constitutional amendment banning same-sex marriage and civil unions also applies to domestic partner benefits.	No No	No Constitution of Michigan prohibits domestic partner benefits for same-sex couples
California	In re Marriage Cases	May 15, 2008	4	3	California Supreme Court overturns Proposition 22 and rules that in 30 days, same-sex marriages must be legal.	Yes Yes	Yes Same-sex marriage licenses issued in California from June 17, 2008, to November 5, 2008; No On November 5, 2008, Proposition 8 goes into effect banning same-sex marriage in the Constitution of California; Yes
Connecticut	Kerrigan v. Commissioner of Public Health	October 10, 2008	4	3	Connecticut Supreme Court rules that same-sex marriages must be legal in 30 days.	Yes Yes	Yes Legalized same-sex marriage in Connecticut on November 12, 2008
Iowa	Varnum v. Brien	April 2009	7	0	Iowa Supreme Court rules that same-sex marriages must be legal in 27 days.	Yes Yes	Yes Legalized same-sex marriage in Iowa on April 27, 2009
California	Strauss v. Horton	May 26, 2009	1	6	California Supreme Court upholds Proposition 8; however, same-sex marriages performed before November 5, 2008, are also upheld.	No No	No California Supreme Court upholds Proposition 8; however, same-sex marriages performed before November 5, 2008, are also upheld. Yes
New York	Lewis v. New York State Department of Civil Service	November 2009	3	2	The case challenging the recognition of same-sex marriages in the state of New York was heard by New York Court of Appeals and upheld the rights that came with the recognition of same-sex marriages.	Yes Recognition upheld	Yes Continuing the recognition of same-sex marriages abroad.
Wisconsin	McConkey v. Van Hollen	June 30, 2010	0	7	Wisconsin Supreme Court upholds constitutional amendment.	No	No
Wyoming	Christiansen v. Christiansen	June 2011	Allowed		Wyoming Supreme Court allows two Wyoming residents to dissolve a legal relationship created under the laws of Canada.	Yes	Yes Couple can divorce in Wyoming
Maryland	McConkey v. Van Hollen	May 18, 2012	7	0	Maryland Court of Appeals upholds Maryland's recognition of out-of-state same-sex marriages.	Yes Recognition upheld	Yes Continuing the recognition of same-sex marriages abroad.
Wisconsin	Appling v. Doyle	July 31, 2014	7	0	On November 4, 2009, Wisconsin Supreme Court declined to hear the challenge to Wisconsin's domestic partnership. On June 20, 2011, the Circuit court Judge Dan Moeser ruled that the domestic partnership registry does not violate the state constitution, finding that the state "does not recognize domestic partnership in a way that even remotely resembles how the state recognizes marriage". On December 21, 2012, District 4 Court of Appeals affirms Judge Moeser's decision in a unanimous ruling. On July 31, 2014, the Wisconsin Supreme Court ruled unanimously that the domestic partnership law does not violate the state's constitutional ban on same-sex marriage.	Yes Recognition upheld	Yes Wisconsin's domestic partnership law is upheld.
Montana	Donaldson and Guggenheim v. State of Montana	December 2012	3	4	Montana Supreme Court affirmed a lower court's dismissal of this case because the plaintiffs had not identified specific state statutes in their complaint. They did not seek the right to marry, but equal treatment for same-sex couples with respect to inheritance rights, health care decisions, and parenting. The Court invited the plaintiffs to file an amended complaint citing specific statutes, which the plaintiffs, did on April 16, 2013.	No	Pending (Lewis and Clark County District Court)
New Mexico	Griego v. Oliver	December 19, 2013	5	0	On March 21, 2013, ACLU filed a lawsuit in the Albuquerque District court on behalf of two New Mexico couples who are seeking the right to marry. On December 19, 2013, New Mexico's Supreme Court declared that denying marriage to same-sex couples is unconstitutional in the state.	Yes Yes	Yes Legalized same-sex marriage in New Mexico on December 19, 2013
Texas	In Re Marriage of J.B. and H.B.	June 19, 2015	n/a	n/a	County judge ruled statutory and constitutional ban on same-sex marriage in violation of the US constitution; appealed to 5th Texas Court of Appeals. The court says Texas's same-sex marriage ban is constitutional. The Fifth Circuit denied en banc review. J.B. sought review from the Texas Supreme Court in February 2011 and that court requested briefs in October. On July 3, 2013, the Texas Supreme Court sua sponte ordered supplemental merits briefing in light of United States v. Windsor.	Case dismissed on June 19, 2015, because a Petitioner died.	
Texas	Texas v. Naylor	June 19, 2015	5	3	On January 7, 2011, the Third Court of Appeals in Austin in the case of State of Texas v. Angelique S. Naylor and Sabina Daly rejected, on procedural grounds, the Texas attorney general's appeal of a divorce granted by a lower court to a same-sex couple married in Massachusetts. The appeal was still pending in December 2012.	Third Court of Appeals upheld in a 5–3 decision on June 19, 2015. The Court ruled that the Texas government had no standing to intervene in the divorce.	

== See also ==
- Same-sex marriage in the United States
- Same-sex marriage status in the United States by state
- Same-sex marriage law in the United States by state
- Same-sex marriage in tribal nations in the United States
- Same-sex union legislation
- Divorce of same-sex couples
