= First Amendment (disambiguation) =

The First Amendment or Amendment One/1 may refer to:

== Amendments to national constitutions ==
- First Amendment to the United States Constitution, regarding freedom of speech, freedom of the press, religious freedom, freedom of assembly, and right to petition
- Australian Constitution Alteration (Senate Elections) Act, 1906, the first amendment to the Australian constitution
- First Amendment of the Constitution of India, which amended several of the Fundamental Rights in India
- First Amendment of the Constitution of Ireland, passed during World War II, concerning the declaration of a national emergency
- First Amendment to the Constitution of Pakistan, which accounted for the secession of Bangladesh
- First Amendment of the Constitution of South Africa, which made three technical changes

== Amendments to U.S. state constitutions ==
- 2004 Georgia Amendment 1, bans same-sex marriage, civil unions and civil union equivalents
- 2004 Kentucky Amendment 1, bans same-sex marriage, civil unions and civil union equivalents
- 2004 Louisiana Amendment 1, bans same-sex marriage, civil unions and civil union equivalents
- 2004 Mississippi Amendment 1, bans same-sex marriage
- 2005 Kansas Amendment 1, bans same-sex marriage, civil unions and civil union equivalents
- 2006 Tennessee Amendment 1, bans same-sex marriage
- 2012 Minnesota Amendment 1, purposed ban on same-sex marriage
- North Carolina Amendment 1, bans same-sex marriage, civil unions and civil union equivalents
- South Carolina Amendment 1, bans same-sex marriage, civil unions and civil union equivalents
