= Same-sex marriage in Georgia =

Same-sex marriage in Georgia may refer to:

- Same-sex marriage in Georgia (country), about the country in the Caucasus region
- Same-sex marriage in Georgia (U.S. state), about one of the states that make up the United States
