= Forum for Equality =

- U.S. State of Louisiana
- Formation: 1989
- Location: New Orleans, Louisiana
- Region served: Louisiana
- Website: forumforequality.org

Forum for Equality is a Louisiana-based statewide LGBTQ civil rights advocacy group that was founded in 1989. The major focus of this group is on the political process, in which it encourages members to participate through reminders of upcoming elections, campaigns promoting awareness of legislation that affects the LGBT community, and rallies to demonstrate popular support for LGBT civil rights. The group also works to educate the LGBT community in Louisiana about the issues that affect the community as a whole. The organization is a member of the Equality Federation.

== Legal work ==
In 2004, Forum for Equality filed a lawsuit, Forum for Equality v. New Orleans, to overturn Amendment 1, a state level ballot initiative which amended Louisiana's constitution to define marriage as being exclusively heterosexual. The organization had pledged to file the suit should the initiative pass. After lower state courts ruled against the amendment, the Louisiana Supreme Court ultimately rejected the suit, claiming the voters in Louisiana had expressed their polls through the ballot box, and suggested that gay and lesbian couples should seek co-ownership of property, ignoring the other legal rights denied to gay and lesbian couples.

Forum For Equality filed a lawsuit on behalf of four couples on February 12, 2014, seeking recognition of same-sex marriages established in other jurisdictions. On March 18, Judge Feldman consolidated the cases with another case filed in January 2014 challenging the state's constitutional ban on same-sex marriage, Robicheaux v. George under the name Robicheaux v. Caldwell. Oral arguments on motions for summary judgment were held on June 25, 2014. On September 3, Judge Feldman ruled for the defendants and upheld the state's constitutional ban on same-sex marriages. All parties asked the United States Court of Appeals for the Fifth Circuit to set an expedited briefing schedule to allow an appeal to be heard alongside De Leon v. Perry, a Texas case. The Fifth Circuit granted that request on September 25. The Fifth Circuit has scheduled oral argument in this case and in De Leon v. Perry for January 9, 2015. On November 20, the plaintiffs filed a petition asking the U.S. Supreme Court for a writ of certiorari before judgment, that is, to hear the case, now Robicheaux v. George, without waiting for a decision from the Fifth Circuit. The state supported that request on December 2.

== Political work ==
In 2008, the group attempted to convince Governor Bobby Jindal not to allow an Executive Order signed by former Governor Kathleen Blanco that protected LGBT employees from discrimination in Louisiana to lapse. However, the Governor stated that he did not feel renewal of the Executive Order was necessary.

In 2009, The Forum met with Louisiana's state Council on Marriage and the Family, a body appointed by conservative Republican Governor Jindal. The video presentation was intended to make the case for easing legal restrictions that bar LGBT families from adopting children in Louisiana. The final decision was to maintain the status quo, which the Forum considered to be a compromise. In effect, single LGBT people can adopt in Louisiana, however, couples cannot.

== See also ==
- LGBT rights in Louisiana
- LGBT history in Louisiana
- Same-sex marriage in Louisiana
- List of LGBT rights organizations
