= Same-sex marriage in Louisiana =

Same-sex marriage has been legal in Louisiana since the U.S. Supreme Court's ruling in Obergefell v. Hodges on June 26, 2015. The Supreme Court held that the denial of marriage rights to same-sex couples violates the U.S. Constitution, invalidating Louisiana's ban on same-sex marriage. Obergefell clarified conflicting court rulings on whether state officials were obligated to license same-sex marriages. Governor Bobby Jindal, highly critical of the Supreme Court ruling, confirmed on June 28 that Louisiana would comply once the Fifth Circuit Court of Appeals reversed a federal court decision in a Louisiana case, Robicheaux v. George, which it did on July 1. Jindal then said the state would not comply with the ruling until the U.S. District Court for the Eastern District of Louisiana reversed its judgment, which it did on July 2. All parishes now issue marriage licenses in accordance with federal law.

Louisiana had previously denied marriage rights to same-sex couples by statute since 1988 and in its State Constitution since 2004. Polling suggests that a narrow majority of Louisianans support the legal recognition of same-sex marriage, with a 2024 Public Religion Research Institute poll showing that 52% of respondents supported same-sex marriage.

== Legal restrictions ==
=== Statutes ===
In 1988 and 1999, the Louisiana State Legislature added provisions to the Civil Code banning same-sex couples from marrying and prohibiting the recognition of same-sex marriages from other jurisdictions. During this period, the U.S. Congress also enacted the Defense of Marriage Act (DOMA; French: Loi de défense du mariage), which banned federal recognition of same-sex marriages. The parts of DOMA that banned same-sex marriages were overturned in 2013 in United States v. Windsor, and the state statutes prohibiting same-sex marriage were likewise struck down in 2015 in Obergefell v. Hodges. Though unconstitutional and unenforceable, these statutes remain on the books. In March 2018, the Louisiana Senate Judiciary Committee rejected 1–4 a bill to repeal the statutory ban, with Senator Jay Luneau, a Democrat from Alexandria, being the sole lawmaker in favor. The bill's main sponsor, Senator Jean-Paul Morrell, said in response, "This is the law of the land whether you like it or not." The Louisiana Law Institute also supported the bill.

=== Constitutional amendment ===
On September 18, 2004, by 78% to 22%, state voters approved a state constitutional amendment that banned same-sex marriages and civil unions. The measure banned any other legal status "identical or substantially similar to that of marriage". There have been unsuccessful attempts to call a limited constitutional convention in an effort to remove the wording. Legislation introduced by Representative Mandie Landry to repeal the constitutional language barring same-sex marriage failed in the House Committee on Civil Law and Procedure on a mostly party-line 5–8 vote in April 2024. Had it been approved, the measure would have been placed on the ballot for approval by voters.

== Lawsuits ==
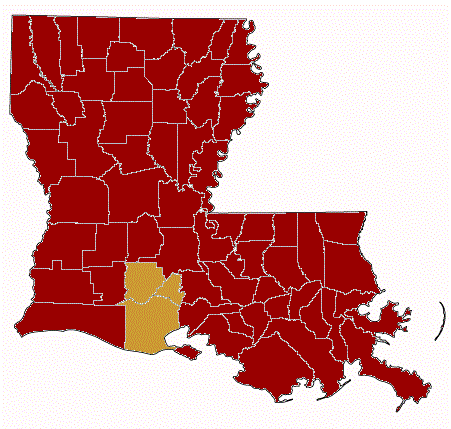
Same-sex marriage in Louisiana before Obergefell v. Hodges Same-sex marriage ban overturned, decision stayed until July 7, 2015 when the Louisiana Supreme Court dismissed the state's appeal in Costanza v. Caldwell, thereby legalizing both same-sex adoption and same-sex marriage in Louisiana. Same-sex marriage banned

=== Costanza v. Caldwell ===
In July 2013, a state trial court dismissed a lawsuit, In Re Costanza and Brewer, brought by a lesbian couple who had married in California and sought to have their marriage recognized in order to allow Constanza to adopt Brewer's biological child. The plaintiffs appealed that dismissal because they were not allowed to amend their complaint, and on February 5, 2014, 15th Judicial District Court Judge Edward Rubin ruled in favor of the plaintiffs and authorized the adoption in a separate action.

Costanza and Brewer merged their suit that challenged Louisiana's same-sex marriage ban and their adoption case into one action. They were represented by private counsel, Lafayette attorney Joshua S. Guillory, and professor of law Paul Baier. On September 22, 2014, Judge Rubin found Louisiana's ban an unconstitutional violation of the Equal Protection, the Due Process and the Full Faith and Credit clauses of the U.S. Constitution. The ruling only applied to the state's 15th Judicial District, comprising the parishes of Lafayette, Acadia and Vermilion. State officials asked Rubin to stay his decision and announced plans to appeal directly to the Louisiana Supreme Court. Rubin ordered the state to allow the plaintiffs to file a joint state income tax return and to allow their adoption to proceed. He also enjoined the state from enforcing laws that "prohibit a person from marrying a person of the same sex". He stayed his ruling pending appeal, and Attorney General Buddy Caldwell appealed directly to the Louisiana Supreme Court, which heard oral arguments as Costanza v. Caldwell on January 29, 2015.

On July 7, 2015, following the U.S. Supreme Court decision in Obergefell v. Hodges on June 26, 2015, the Louisiana Supreme Court, by a 6–1 ruling, found the case moot and dismissed the state's appeal, making the district court's ruling in Costanza final and binding.

=== Robicheaux v. George ===
Same-sex marriage in the United States

In July 2013, a lawsuit brought in the U.S. District Court for the Eastern District of Louisiana challenged the state's refusal to recognize same-sex marriages from other jurisdictions. The plaintiffs were a same-sex couple married in Iowa in September 2012, later joined by a second couple. The case was assigned to Judge Martin Feldman. The court dismissed the suit in November 2013 because it found that the only named defendant, Attorney General Caldwell, had taken no specific action with respect to the plaintiffs' marriages. On February 5, 2014, the Robicheaux plaintiffs, now joined by two women married in Iowa in 2013 and two men denied a marriage license in New Orleans in January 2014, refiled their suit, naming as principal defendant the Louisiana Director of Health, along with the Secretary of Revenue, with the case now styled Robicheaux v. George. Forum For Equality filed a separate suit on behalf of four couples on February 12, seeking recognition of same-sex marriages established in other jurisdictions. On March 18, Judge Feldman consolidated the two cases under the name Robicheaux v. Caldwell. Oral arguments on motions for summary judgment were held on June 25.

On September 3, Judge Feldman ruled for the defendants, writing that "Louisiana has a legitimate interest ... whether obsolete in the opinion of some, or not, in the opinion of others ... in linking children to an intact family formed by their two biological parents". He wrote that the idea of same-sex marriage was "nonexistent and even inconceivable until very recently". He described the issue as "a clash between convictions regarding the value of state decisions reached by way of the democratic process as contrasted with personal, genuine, and sincere lifestyle choices recognition." He found that nothing in United States v. Windsor or previous Fifth Circuit decisions required him to subject Louisiana's ban to "heightened scrutiny". He also ruled that "there is simply no fundamental right, historically or traditionally, to same-sex marriage." Under "rational basis review", he accepted the state's claim that its laws "serve a central state interest of linking children to an intact family formed by their biological parents" and further its interest in "safeguarding that fundamental social change ... is better cultivated through democratic consensus." He wrote:

The Court is persuaded that a meaning of what is marriage that has endured in history for thousands of years, and prevails in a majority of states today, is not universally irrational on the constitutional grid.

He characterized other federal court decisions invalidating state bans on same-sex marriage as "the volley of nationally orchestrated court rulings ... [that] thus far exemplify a pageant of empathy; decisions impelled by a response of innate pathos." He also asked what the impact of a decision for the plaintiffs might foretell:

[I]nconvenient questions persist. For example, must the states permit or recognize a marriage between an aunt and niece? Aunt and nephew? Brother/brother? Father and child? May minors marry? Must marriage be limited to only two people? What about a transgender spouse? Is such a union same-gender or male-female? ... This Court is powerless to be indifferent to the unknown and possibly imprudent consequences of such a decision.

All parties asked the Fifth Circuit Court of Appeals to set an expedited briefing schedule to allow an appeal to be heard alongside a Texas case, De Leon v. Perry. The Fifth Circuit granted that request on September 25. The Fifth Circuit heard oral arguments on January 9, 2015, before Judges Patrick Higginbotham, Jerry Edwin Smith, and James E. Graves Jr. On November 20, the plaintiffs filed a petition asking the U.S. Supreme Court for a writ of certiorari before judgment, that is, to hear the case, now Robicheaux v. George, without waiting for a decision from the Fifth Circuit. The state supported that request on December 2. The Supreme Court denied that petition on January 12, 2015.

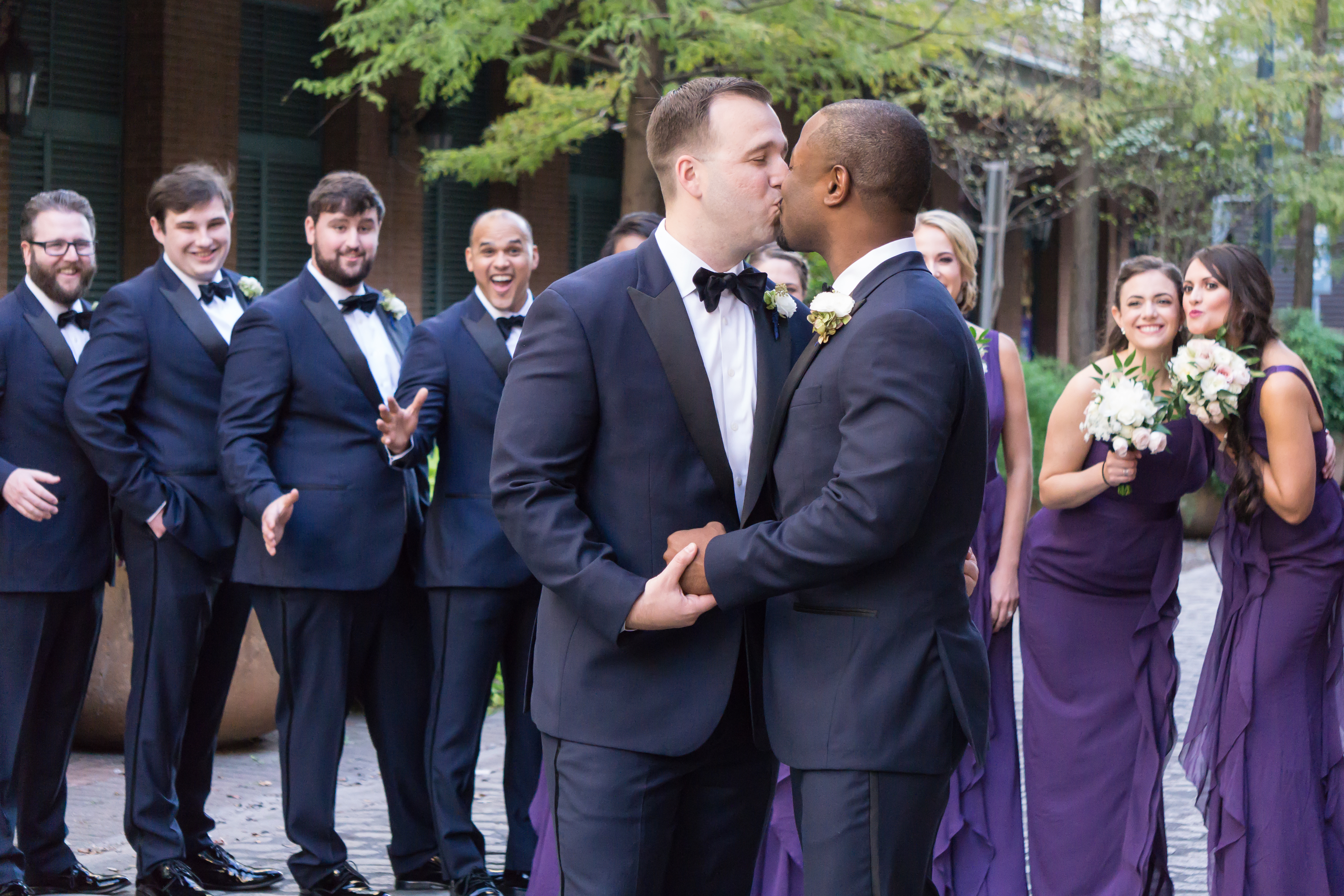
A same-sex marriage in New Orleans on November 11, 2017

On June 26, 2015, the U.S. Supreme Court ruled in Obergefell v. Hodges that same-sex marriage bans violate the Equal Protection and Due Process clauses of the Fourteenth Amendment, legalizing same-sex marriage nationwide in the United States. The Robicheaux plaintiffs asked the Fifth Circuit to immediately reverse the district court ruling and have that court resolve the case in their favor. The same day, Attorney General Caldwell claimed that nothing in the Obergefell decision required the state to cease enforcing its same-sex marriage ban immediately. On June 28, Governor Bobby Jindal said the state would comply with the Supreme Court decision as soon as the Fifth Circuit reversed the district court ruling in Robicheaux. On July 1, the Fifth Circuit reversed the earlier ruling in Robicheaux and instructed the district court to record a judgment for the plaintiffs no later than July 17. Jindal then said the state would not recognize same-sex marriages until the district court reversed its ruling. In the district court, Judge Feldman issued a new judgment in favor of the plaintiffs on July 2.

Jindal was a vocal opponent of the Obergefell ruling. His initial reaction was to call for the disbanding of the Supreme Court, calling it "a public opinion poll instead of a judicial body". Jindal further stated, "This decision will pave the way for an all out assault against the religious freedom rights of Christians who disagree with this decision. This ruling must not be used as pretext by Washington to erode our right to religious liberty." Despite the United States being a secular state and the Establishment Clause forbidding governments from establishing or sponsoring religion, Jindal said that "[m]arriage between a man and a woman was established by God, and no earthly court can alter that." Attorney General Caldwell said he was "disappointed" with the decision and that it "[took] away a right that should have been left to the states". Several parishes began issuing marriage licenses to same-sex couples on June 29, including Jefferson, Calcasieu, East Baton Rouge, West Feliciana, East Feliciana, Assumption, Livingston, Ascension and Tangipahoa. Celeste Autin and Alesia LeBoeuf were the first same-sex couple to marry in Louisiana in the early hours of Monday, June 29 in Jefferson Parish. A second couple, Michael Robinson and Earl Benjamin, were issued a marriage license in Gretna at around 11 a.m. that same day. On July 1, media outlets reported that Orleans Parish was still refusing to issue marriage licenses to same-sex couples. The district court ordered the state to begin licensing same-sex marriages the next day, and the state complied. However, for several more days, several parishes refused to issue marriage licenses to same-sex couples, including Jackson, LaSalle, Lincoln, Madison, Red River, St. Tammany and Webster. Those parishes began issuing licenses to all couples on July 6, 2015.

=== Parentage cases ===
In Louisiana, a man is afforded the "marital presumption of paternity" for any child his wife bears during their marriage. However, this presumption does not extend to same-sex couples. As a result, a spouse in a same-sex marriage who lacks a biological connection to the child is not automatically granted custodial rights. Two same-sex parentage and custody cases are currently making their way through state courts: Foret v. Serrano and Myers v. Myers. The latter case involves a lesbian couple, Mary Margaret Myers and Peyton Myers, with a three-year old daughter. The couple divorced in July 2023, and Peyton Myers, the biological mother, sought sole custody. Mary Myers contested, and asked the court to dismiss her ex-wife's claims, arguing that denying her custodial rights violates constitutional guarantees laid out in Obergefell. An East Baton Rouge Parish judge ruled in Mary Myers' favor in 2023, noting that, while she was not the biological mother, she had signed the child's birth certificate.

The second case involves a couple, Jason Serrano and Jonathan Foret, who married in 2021 and had a child conceived through in vitro fertilisation in March of that year. However, Foret, the biological father, withheld custody and refused Serrano visitation after their divorce in 2022. When Serrano petitioned the courts for joint custody, a Terrebonne Parish judge denied his bid to establish paternity and refused to recognize him as the child's legal parent. The Louisiana First Circuit Court of Appeal ruled in May 2024 that presumption does not apply to this case and Serrano could not be deemed a legal parent under current Louisiana law. The court acknowledged "deficiencies" in state laws surrounding same-sex couples but said it would be up to lawmakers to expand the presumption of parentage in statutes to make it applicable to same-sex couples.

== Native American nations ==
The Indian Civil Rights Act primarily aims to protect the rights of Native Americans but also reinforces the principle of tribal self-governance. While it does not grant sovereignty, the Act affirms the authority of tribes to govern their own legal affairs. Consequently, many tribes have enacted their own marriage and family laws. As a result, the Supreme Court's Obergefell ruling did not automatically apply to tribal jurisdictions. Same-sex marriage is not legal on the reservation of the Chitimacha Tribe of Louisiana. Its Tribal Code states that "for a man and a woman to be married under this chapter each must: (1) be at least sixteen (16) years of age; (2) freely consent to the marriage; and (3) if under eighteen (18) years of age, obtain the consent of their custodial parents or legal guardians, if any." If the couple meets the requirements to marry, the Chitimacha Tribal Court in Charenton will issue a marriage license, and the couple may also choose to have a marriage ceremony, which may be performed by a judge of the Chitimacha Tribal Court, any public official whose duties include solemnizing marriages, or by an ordained or recognized minister, priest, or other leader of any religious faith. (Note: The officiant who performs the ceremony shall issue a marriage certificate to the married couple, known in Chitimacha as qapx kice (pronounced [ʔapʃ ˈk̯itʃe]). The certificate must be signed by the officiant and at least two witnesses.) However, while same-sex marriages cannot be performed, marriages performed outside the reservation, including in the state of Louisiana, are legally recognized. The Tribal Code states that "[a] marriage duly licensed and performed under the laws of the United States, any tribe, or foreign nation shall be recognized as valid by the Chitimacha Tribal Court for all purposes." Similarly, language guaranteeing recognition of marriage licenses from other jurisdictions is found in the Judicial Codes (Koasati: Aybacilká) of the Coushatta Tribe of Louisiana: "A marriage which is valid under the laws of the State of Louisiana shall be recognized as valid for all purposes by the Coushatta Tribe." On the other hand, the Tribal Code (Tunica: Yoluyana; Biloxi: Ąyaaxi; Atakapa: Cox̣kóy) of the Tunica-Biloxi Indian Tribe and the Tribal Constitution (Houma: Anũpaʼ Alhpesaʼ) of the state-recognized United Houma Nation are silent on who may marry. It is also unclear if same-sex marriage is legal in the Jena Band of Choctaw Indians as tribal officials have not publicly commented on the issue.

Native Americans have deep-rooted marriage traditions, placing a strong emphasis on community, family and spiritual connections. While there are no records of same-sex marriages being performed in Native American cultures in the way they are commonly defined in Western legal systems, many Indigenous communities recognize identities and relationships that may be placed on the LGBT spectrum. Among these are two-spirit individuals—people who embody both masculine and feminine qualities. In some cultures, two-spirit individuals assigned male at birth wear women's clothing and engage in household and artistic work associated with the feminine sphere. Historically, this identity sometimes allowed for unions between two people of the same biological sex. In the Choctaw language, two-spirit people are known as ohoyo holba (pronounced [ohoːjó hólba]), though the term is relatively modern. It is unknown if Choctaw two-spirit individuals were historically allowed to marry, as a lot of traditional knowledge was lost in the aftermath of colonization and the Trail of Tears for those Choctaw forcibly removed to the Indian Territory. Choctaw author LeAnne Howe stated in a 2022 book, "Often they weren't just involved with other men but had many levels of relationships. They were also involved with our community in very special ways. They could be healers. They're people that protected our children because they embodied more than one thing. And what is part of Choctawan aesthetics is that we revere things that are unusual. Different. When you look at the spirit that's connected in [ohoyo holba], and when they put on that dress in olden times, they are saying 'the embodiment of many'." Some female-bodied two-spirit individuals use the term hattak holba (pronounced [hat.ták hólba]). These modern terms usually tend to mean a gay, lesbian, or transgender person, though some two-spirit people do identify with them.

== Demographics and marriage statistics ==
Data from the 2000 U.S. census showed that 8,808 same-sex couples were living in Louisiana. By 2005, this had increased to 9,006 couples. Same-sex couples lived in all parishes of the state and constituted 1.0% of coupled households and 0.5% of all households in the state. Most couples lived in New Orleans, Jefferson and East Baton Rouge parishes, but the parishes with the highest percentage of same-sex couples were New Orleans (0.95% of all parish households) and Pointe Coupee (0.63%). Same-sex partners in Louisiana were on average younger than opposite-sex partners, more racially diverse, and more likely to be employed. However, the average and median household incomes of same-sex couples were lower than different-sex couples, and same-sex couples were also far less likely to own a home than opposite-sex partners. 25% of same-sex couples in Louisiana were raising children under the age of 18, with an estimated 4,157 children living in households headed by same-sex couples in 2005.

The 2020 U.S. census showed that there were 6,990 married same-sex couple households (2,934 male couples and 4,506 female couples) and 7,181 unmarried same-sex couple households in Louisiana.

== Domestic partnerships ==
In 1997, the city of New Orleans extended health insurance benefits to the same-sex partners of city employees, the first and only city in the state to do so. In 1999, it created a domestic partner registry.

== Public opinion ==
Public opinion for same-sex marriage in Louisiana
Poll source	Dates administered	Sample size	Margin of error	Support	Opposition	Do not know / refused
Public Religion Research Institute	February 28 – December 8, 2025	238 adults	?	53%	44%	3%
Public Religion Research Institute	March 13 – December 2, 2024	286 adults	?	52%	45%	3%
Public Religion Research Institute	March 9 – December 7, 2023	227 adults	?	58%	39%	3%
Public Religion Research Institute	March 11 – December 14, 2022	?	?	62%	36%	2%
Public Religion Research Institute	March 8 – November 9, 2021	?	?	52%	46%	2%
Public Religion Research Institute	January 7 – December 20, 2020	549 adults	?	62%	36%	2%
Public Religion Research Institute	April 5 – December 23, 2017	983 adults	?	48%	44%	8%
Public Religion Research Institute	May 18, 2016 – January 10, 2017	1,410 adults	?	44%	45%	11%
Public Religion Research Institute	April 29, 2015 – January 7, 2016	1,170 adults	?	41%	49%	10%
Public Religion Research Institute	April 2, 2014 – January 4, 2015	825 adults	?	42%	48%	10%
New York Times/CBS News/YouGov	September 20 – October 1, 2014	2,187 likely voters	± 2.5%	39%	46%	15%
Public Policy Polling	June 26–29, 2014	664 registered voters	± 3.8%	32%	55%	13%
Public Policy Research Lab	February 4–24, 2014	1,095 adults	± 3.0%	42%	53%	5%
Public Policy Polling	August 16–19, 2013	721 voters	± 3.7%	28%	63%	9%
Harper Polling	April 6–7, 2013	541 likely voters	± 4.2%	21%	60%	19%
Public Policy Research Lab	February 8 – March 17, 2013	930 adults	± 3.6%	39%	56%	5%
Public Policy Polling	February 8–12, 2013	603 voters	± 4.0%	29%	59%	12%

== See also ==
- LGBT rights in Louisiana
- Same-sex marriage in the United States
