= 2004 in LGBTQ rights =

This is a list of notable events in the history of LGBTQ rights that took place in the year 2004.

== Events ==
=== January ===
- 1 – Tasmanian laws come into effect recognising civil unions between same-sex couples. Tasmania becomes the first Australian state to enact such laws.
- 8 – The New Jersey legislature passes a bill creating a domestic partnership status for same-sex couples, with many of the same legal rights as marriage. Governor James McGreevy signs the bill into law four days later, making New Jersey the fifth US state to offer such a status to same-sex couples. The law officially takes effect 180 days later.

=== February ===
- 4 – The Massachusetts Supreme Judicial Court answers the state's senate that the proposed civil unions will still violate the constitution by maintaining an inferior status of same-sex couples.
- 6 – Bob Taft, governor of the U.S. state of Ohio, signs the state's Defense of Marriage Act which denies recognition of same-sex marriages, civil unions or domestic partner agreements performed in other states. It also outlaws same-sex marriage within the state and forbids state benefits from being extended to gay and lesbian couples.
- 10 – In the United Kingdom, the Gender Recognition Bill passes in the House of Lords.
- 12
  - National Freedom to Marry Day in the United States
  - City officials in San Francisco start issuing marriage licenses to same-sex couples in violation of state law, staging what they view as an act of civil disobedience, by marrying Del Martin and Phyllis Lyon in the first known civil marriage of a same-sex couple in the country. Over 80 couples are whisked through quick ceremonies.
  - In the U.S. state of Virginia, the House of Delegates gives preliminary approval to legislation that would ban the recognition of same-sex civil unions and partnerships.
- 15 – Officials at the city and county of San Francisco turn away hundreds of would-be same-sex newlyweds after thousands of couples show up to marry over the weekend. The city claims it can only handle between 400 and 600 marriages a day, or about one a minute.
- 16 – Officials at the city and county of San Francisco estimate by the end of the day that they will have issued 2,000 marriage licenses for same-sex couples in the four days since they started granting licenses to same-sex couples.
- 17 – San Francisco Superior court Judge James L. Warner postpones any decision to block San Francisco from issuing marriage licenses to same-sex couples and to void the 2,464 same-sex marriages that were performed in the city since February 12. This was on the grounds that the Proposition 22 Legal Defense and Education Fund's order for San Francisco to "cease and desist issuing marriage licenses to and/or solemnizing marriages of same-sex couples; to show cause before this court..." had an improper semicolon. To do both, rather than one or the other, would have exceeded the judge's jurisdiction.
- 18 – The California state agency that records marriages states that forms which have been altered, as San Francisco slightly did on its same-sex marriage licenses, will not be registered.
- 19
  - In Washington, D.C., The Bush administration reserves judgement on the proposed Federal Marriage Amendment to the U.S. Constitution until the Massachusetts legislature and San Francisco courts take further action.
  - San Francisco sues the state of California to force the state to accept marriage licenses it altered to remove reference to bride and groom.
  - The American Civil Liberties Union says it will appeal to U.S. federal court to overturn Florida's laws banning adoption by lesbians and gays.
- 20
  - Victoria Dunlap, county clerk of rural Sandoval County, New Mexico, starts issuing marriage licenses to same-sex couples, citing lack of legal grounds for denial.
  - Democratic party leaders in California try to withdraw from the divisive political issue of same-sex marriage. A Public Policy Institute of California poll indicates that half of Californians oppose same-sex marriage.
  - Arnold Schwarzenegger, governor of California, writes to state Attorney General Bill Lockyer telling him to take legal action to stop the San Francisco from granting marriage licenses to same-sex couples, saying the practice presents "an imminent risk to civil order".
  - In the U.S. state of Oklahoma, a proposed amendment to the state's constitution to outlaw same-sex marriage dies in the Senate Human Resources Committee.
- 22 – Saying he will defend California's laws limiting marriage to opposite-sex couples, state attorney general Bill Lockyer dismisses governor Arnold Schwarzenegger's "order" in the San Francisco marriage licenses debate, saying the office of Attorney General is independent of gubernatorial power.
- 24
  - United States President George W. Bush announces his support for a constitutional amendment to ban same-sex marriage. Bush did not explicitly endorse the Federal Marriage Amendment (FMA), which has been criticised for potentially also denying states the ability to recognise same-sex civil unions and partnerships. However, he did say that the FMA "meets his principles" in protecting the "sanctity of marriage" between men and women.
- 26 – The mayor of New Paltz, a village in the U.S. state of New York, announces that the town will start performing civil marriages for same-sex couples. It will not attempt to issue marriage certificates, but married couples in New York state will have six months from the date of their wedding to seek a certificate.
- 27
  - The Supreme Court of California refuses a petition by state Attorney General Bill Lockyer asking for an immediate ruling on the constitutionality of same-sex marriage and a cease and desist order to prevent San Francisco from granting marriage licenses to more same-sex couples.
  - Republican lawmakers in the Indiana House of Representatives fail to introduce legislation for a constitutional amendment banning same-sex marriage, due to legal maneuvering by Democratic lawmakers in the House's leadership causing the Republicans to miss the 2004 deadline for introducing new legislation.

=== March ===
- 2 – Jason West, mayor of New Paltz is charged with 19 criminal counts of "solemnizing" marriages without a license after officiating same-sex marriage unions. He faces up to a $500 fine and a year in jail on each count.
- 3 – Multnomah County, Oregon, which includes the city of Portland, becomes the second county in the United States where same-sex marriages are legally performed after four county commissioners decide the current state law banning marriage from same-sex couples is against the Oregon constitution. Couples lined up, and clergy performed ceremonies for 3,022 gay couples, mostly from Oregon, over the next month and a half. Couples from throughout the country flocked to Portland to obtain a license and marry legally. See April 20 for a continuation of the story.
- 5
  - The Wisconsin State Assembly approves a state constitutional amendment (voted 68–27) to ban same-sex marriage or civil unions.
  - The Kansas House passes, by 88 votes to 36, a proposed constitutional amendment to ban same-sex marriage.
- 10 – Indianapolis, Indiana mayor Bart Peterson issues an executive order that prohibiting discrimination based on sexual orientation in city and county employment as well as city contractors and vendors.
- 11 – The California Supreme Court orders San Francisco officials to stop performing same-sex marriages. San Francisco officials comply with this order and, for the first time since February 12, refuse to issue marriage licenses to same-sex couples. At the same time, the City Attorney of San Francisco sues the State of California on the grounds that prohibiting same-sex marriages is unconstitutional (on a state level).
- 12
  - Oregon's attorney general issues his opinion on same-sex marriage within Oregon. He concludes that current state law prohibits issuing marriage licenses to same-sex couples, but that the Oregon Supreme Court is likely to conclude those statutes violate the state's constitution.
  - The Wisconsin State Senate approves a state constitutional amendment by a vote of 20–13 to ban same-sex marriage or civil unions.
- 15
  - Commissioners of Multnomah County, Oregon, dismiss state attorney general Hardy Myers' non-binding opinion that same-sex marriages are illegal and vow to continue issuing marriage licenses to same-sex couples.
  - In South Africa, the Alteration of Sex Description and Sex Status Act comes into force, allowing transsexual and intersex people to change their legally recognized sex.
- 16 – Rhea County, Tennessee commissioners vote 8–0 to ask that state law be changed to allow county officials to effectively ban homosexuals from the county by being able to charge them with "crimes against nature". After a community uproar, the resolution is withdrawn two days later.
- 19 – Quebec joins Ontario and British Columbia in legalizing same-sex marriage after the Quebec Court of Appeals upholds Hendricks and Leboeuf v. Quebec. More than two-thirds of the Canadian population now live in provinces that recognize same-sex marriage.
- 31 – The British government announces the details of the new Civil Partnerships Bill. This would give legal recognition to same sex couples.

=== April ===
- 1 – The first legal same-sex marriage in the Canadian province of Quebec is celebrated; Michael Hendricks and René Leboeuf wed in Montreal.
- 20 – Oregon Circuit Court Judge Frank Bearden ruled that the state must "accept and register" marriages of same-sex couples. He then ordered a temporary stop to issuing new licenses, but gave the Oregon Legislative Assembly 90 days from the start of its next session to write a law that ensures identical rights for same-sex couples, which could happen through civil marriage or civil union. If the legislature fails to act on the issue within the 90 days, licenses to same-sex couples will resume. The order has been appealed by both proponents and opponents of same-sex marriage, in hopes of the issue making a fast track to the Oregon Supreme Court, which may rule the ban on same-sex marriage unconstitutional. A ruling upheld by the state supreme court in 1999 says government officials must meet an extraordinary burden to treat gays and straights differently – the same high burden required to justify disparate treatment of blacks and whites, or men and women. Opponents hope to change the Oregon constitution to define marriage as restricted to one man and one woman through a vote on the November 2004 ballot.

=== May ===
- 17 – Massachusetts becomes the first state to issue marriage licenses to same-sex couple and perform same-sex marriages.
- 29 – U.S. District Judge Nancy Gertner (in Massachusetts) rules that stating that someone is homosexual does not libel or slander them, saying that "a finding that such a statement is defamatory requires this court to legitimize the prejudice and bigotry that for too long have plagued the homosexual community". The ruling came in a lawsuit of James Albright against the singer Madonna: Albright's name had appeared in a photo caption in a book by Andrew Morton about Madonna. Gertner said previous rulings that stating someone is homosexual is defamatory had relied on laws criminalizing same-sex sexual acts, and had to be reevaluated in light of more recent rulings that such laws are Constitutionally suspect.

=== June ===
- 3 – The first civil union is realized in Rio Grande do Sul, Brazil.
- 21 – Maine Governor John Baldacci issues an executive order requiring businesses contracting with the state not to discriminate on the basis of sexual orientation.
- 24 – the United Kingdom government suffers a defeat in the House of Lords as they approve a wrecking amendment to the Civil Partnership Bill.
- 30 – The Spanish minister of justice, Juan Fernando López Aguilar, announces a number of social bills to be introduced, including one that will legalize same-sex marriage in Spain, one that will introduce rights for common-law couples, and one that will allow transsexual and transgender people to legally change their name and sex designation without the requirement of surgery.

=== July ===
- 1 – In the United Kingdom, the Gender Recognition Act 2004 receives Royal Assent
- 14
  - The Yukon becomes the first territory to legalise same-sex marriage after a ruling by the Yukon Supreme Court.
  - The United States Senate votes 48–50 against a procedural motion that would have ended debate on the Federal Marriage Amendment, effectively denying Senate approval this session.
- 22 – The United States House of Representatives passes legislation preventing federal courts from ordering courts in other states recognize same-sex marriage granted elsewhere.
- 30 – Having been passed by the Legislature in April, Maine's Domestic Partnership law comes into effect.

=== August ===
- 9
  - Appointed by Michigan Gov. Jennifer Granholm, Rudy Serra is sworn in as a judge in the state's District 36, serving Detroit, becoming the first openly gay judge in the state.
  - Authorities in Nepal raid bars and clubs to arrest 39 members of the Blue Diamond Society, a gay rights and AIDS education organization and charge them with "spreading perversion".
- 12
  - In a 5–2 vote, the Supreme Court of California voids the almost 4,000 same-sex marriages performed in San Francisco between February 12 and March 11 after another, unanimous decision that the city's officials overstepped their legal rights in ignoring state laws in issuing marriages licences to same-sex couples.
  - New Jersey governor James McGreevey becomes the first openly gay chief executive of a US state when he discloses an extramarital affair with another man and announces his resignation effective November 12.
- 13 – The Australian Senate passes legislation by a 38–7 vote that defines marriage as a union of one man and one woman, granting prime minister John Howard a victory in his campaign to outlaw same-sex marriage in the country.
- 16
  - Federal justice minister Irwin Cotler announces that the federal government will no longer resist court proceedings aiming to require provincial governments to issue same-sex marriage licences.
  - Ohio election officials approve the wording to be placed on the state ballot for the proposed state constitutional amendment to ban same-sex marriage and extension of marriage rights to the non-married.
- 17
  - UNAIDS and Human Rights Watch call on the government of Nepal to release the 39 members of the Blue Diamond Society imprisoned August 9.
  - Indiana Governor Joseph Kernan issues an executive order banning gender identity discrimination in the public sector.

=== September ===
- 16 – Manitoba becomes the fifth of Canada's provinces or territories to have legal same-sex marriage. Neither the federal nor provincial governments opposed the lawsuit filed by three couples, one of whom had previously filed suit for same-sex marriage in 1974. See Same-sex marriage in Manitoba.
- 23 – California governor Arnold Schwarzenegger signs SB 1234, a bill that defines the legal term "hate crime" (which includes LGBT-motivated violence) for all state and local agencies, encourages the creation of local law enforcement hate-crime protocols and increased hate crime awareness training for law enforcement officers.
- 24 – Nova Scotia becomes the sixth of Canada's provinces or territories to have legal same-sex marriage. Neither the federal nor provincial governments opposed the lawsuit filed by three couples, one of whom had already been married in Ontario and sought recognition for their marriage in their home province. See Same-sex marriage in Nova Scotia.
- 25 – California governor Arnold Schwarzenegger signs AB 2900, a bill to unify all state anti-discrimination codes to match the California Fair Employment and Housing Act. In essence it adds "sexual orientation" and "gender identity" anti-discrimination protections to the California government, labor, military and veterans, public utilities, unemployment and insurance, and welfare and institutions codes.
- 27 – California governor Arnold Schwarzenegger signs SB 1193, a bill to provide a $10,000 death benefit to the surviving spouse or designated beneficiary of a member of one of the state military reserves (California National Guard, State Military Reserve, or Naval militia). The bill, retroactive to March 1, 2003, allows LGBT partners of military personnel be listed as "designated beneficiary".
- 30 – The proposed Federal Marriage Amendment fails to pass the United States House of Representatives, with a vote of 227–186 on House Joint Resolution 106.

=== October ===
- 1 – The cabinet of Spanish Prime Minister José Luis Rodríguez Zapatero approves a bill to legalize same-sex marriage; the government believes that it will pass the full parliament.
- 29 – Germany expands the rights of same-sex couples, allowing registered domestic partners to adopt each other's children.

=== November ===
- 2
  - Voters in 11 states pass amendments to their state constitutions banning same-sex marriage, and in most of those states, civil unions and domestic partnership as well.
  - Voters in San Mateo County, California approve a measure to prohibit public-sector employment discrimination based on sexual orientation, with 70.5 per cent of votes in favor.
- 5 – A judge in Saskatchewan rules that same-sex couples have the right to marry in that province.
- 18 – In the United Kingdom, the Civil Partnership Act receives royal assent.
- 29 – Without comment, the Supreme Court of the United States refuses to hear arguments appealing the Massachusetts Supreme Judicial Court ruling that same-sex marriage must be allowed in that state, in essence letting the ruling stand.
- 30 – In the case of Fourie v Minister of Home Affairs, the Supreme Court of Appeal of South Africa rules that the common law definition of marriage must be extended to include same-sex couples. Same-sex marriages would not become immediately possible because of limitations in the Marriage Act; in any event, the government took the decision on appeal to the Constitutional Court.

=== December ===
- 6 – Louisiana Governor Kathleen Blanco issues an executive order banning sexual orientation discrimination in the public sector.
- 9
  - Parliament of New Zealand passes the Civil Union Bill, establishing the new institution of civil union, available to same-sex and de facto couples. The Civil Union Bill has been described as a copy of the Marriage Act with "marriage" replaced by "civil union". Its companion bill, the Relationships (Statutory References) Bill, was to remove discriminatory provisions from a large number of pieces of legislation, but has run into stumbling blocks in Parliament and has been shelved until 2005.
  - The Supreme Court of Canada rules in its reference on same-sex marriage that altering the legal definition of marriage to include same-sex couples is within the jurisdiction of the Parliament of Canada. Prime Minister Paul Martin indicates that his government will introduce such a bill early in the new year.
- 21 – Newfoundland and Labrador becomes the eighth province to legalize same-sex marriage after a Supreme Court judge approves the licences for two lesbian couples.

== Deaths ==
- November 28 – Leroy F. Aarons, 70, founder of the National Lesbian and Gay Journalists Association

== See also ==
- Timeline of LGBTQ history – timeline of events from 12,000 BCE to present
- LGBTQ rights by country or territory – current legal status around the world
- LGBTQ social movements
