= Domestic partnership in Maine =

Domestic partnerships were established in the state of Maine by statute in April 2004, taking effect on July 30, 2004. This placed Maine in the category of U.S. states that offered limited recognition of same-sex relationships, but not all of the legal protections of marriage, as Maine does not recognize common law marriages.

According to the Maine Department of Health and Human Services, "It is important to remember that a registered domestic partnership is NOT the same as a marriage and does not entitle partners to rights other than those for which the registry was intended. This registry is intended to allow individuals to have rights of inheritance as well as the right to make decisions regarding disposal of their deceased partners' remains."

== Rights of domestic partners ==
According to the Maine Department of Health and Human Services,

P.L. 2003, c. 672, enacted by the Legislature and signed into law on April 28, 2004, establishes the concept of domestic partners in Maine law. Under the law, registered domestic partners are accorded a legal status similar to that of a married person with respect to matters of probate, guardianships, conservatorships, inheritance, protection from abuse, and related matters. The legislation establishes a Domestic Partner Registry housed within the Office of Health Data and Program Management, Bureau of Health of the Department of Health and Human Services.

Furthermore, according to the Human Rights Campaign, registered domestic partners in Maine "can inherit a deceased partner’s property if he or she dies without a will, make funeral and burial arrangements, be named a guardian or conservator if their partner becomes incapacitated, be named a representative to administer a deceased partner’s estate and make organ and tissue donations. Same-sex partners are also explicitly protected in the state’s domestic violence laws."

== Registration ==
To register as domestic partners in Maine, both parties must be mentally competent adults, must have been legally domiciled together in Maine for the preceding 12 months, must not be within prohibited degrees of consanguinity, and must not be married to, or in a domestic partnership with someone else. Opposite-sex couples who meet these requirements may also register as domestic partners; as of 2006, at least 24% of partnerships in the registry (17 of 70) were believed to be between opposite-sex partners.

Couples can register by sending a signed and notarized form to the Office of Vital Statistics in Augusta. Domestic partnerships in Maine are automatically terminated if one party marries someone else. They can also be terminated after 60 days by filing a declaration of mutual consent, signed by both parties; or by one party, after serving notice on the other party according to strict state guidelines.

== Demographics ==
In 2000, the federal census counted 37,881 unmarried-couple households in Maine; of these, 8.95%, or 3,394, were same-sex couples (44% male, 56% female). In contrast, the same census showed 272,152 married couples in the state. Total state population was 1,274,923.

In a June, 2008, report the Williams Institute of the UCLA School of Law analyzed census data and concluded, "While in many respects Maine’s same-sex couples look like married couples, same-sex couples with children have fewer economic resources to provide for their families than married parents and lower rates of homeownership."

The report noted, among other things, that:

- By 2005, the number of same-sex couples increased to 4,847. This increase likely reflects same-sex couples’ growing willingness to disclose their partnerships on government surveys.
- In 2005, there were an estimated 52,801 gay, lesbian, and bisexual people (single and coupled) living in Maine.
- There are more female same-sex couples (56%) than male same-sex couples (44%) in Maine.
- Individuals in same-sex couples are, on average, 43 years old, and significantly younger than individuals in married couples (49 years old) in Maine.
- Same-sex couples live in every county in Maine and constitute 1.1% of coupled households and 0.7% of all households in the state.
- 8% of individuals in same-sex couples are nonwhite, compared with 2% of married individuals.
- The median income of same-sex coupled households in Maine is $62,000, compared to $50,140 for married couples. The average household income of same-sex couples is $64,134, compared to $61,512 for married couples.
- 63% of same-sex couples in Maine own their home, compared to 87% of married couples.
- The median household income of same-sex couples with children is $38,100, or 30% lower than that of married parents ($54,600). The average household income of same-sex couples with children is $45,089, significantly less than $64,965 for married parents.
- While 44% of same-sex couples with children own their home, a significantly larger percentage of married parents (86%) own their home.
- 16% of same-sex couples in Maine are raising children under the age of 18.
- As of 2005, an estimated 1,228 of Maine’s children are living in households headed by same-sex couples.
- In Maine, married and same-sex couples with children under 18 in the home have, on average, two children.
- 5% of Maine’s adopted children (or 323 children) live with a lesbian or gay parent.

== See also ==
- LGBT rights in Maine
- Same-sex marriage in Maine
- Domestic partnership in the United States
