= Same-sex marriage in Wyoming =

Same-sex marriage has been legally recognized in Wyoming since October 21, 2014. On October 6, 2014, the U.S. Supreme Court declined to hear appeals in two cases from the Tenth Circuit Court of Appeals, Kitchen v. Herbert and Bishop v. Smith, which had found bans on same-sex marriage in Utah and Oklahoma unconstitutional. The following day, four same-sex couples filed a lawsuit in the U.S. District Court for the District of Wyoming to have the state's ban declared unconstitutional as well. On October 17, Judge Scott W. Skavdahl ruled for the plaintiffs in Guzzo v. Mead. His ruling took effect on October 21 when state officials notified the court that they would not appeal the decision.

Wyoming had previously prohibited state recognition of same-sex marriages by statute since 1977 and had enacted a more explicit ban in 2003. An attempt to enact legislation recognizing domestic partnerships as an alternative to marriage for same-sex couples failed in 2013, and attempts to pass a constitutional amendment banning same-sex marriage were also unsuccessful. Polling suggests that a majority of Wyoming residents support the legal recognition of same-sex marriage, with a 2024 Public Religion Research Institute poll showing that 62% of respondents supported same-sex marriage.

== Legal restrictions ==
In 1977, the Wyoming State Legislature passed a ban on same-sex marriage. In 2003, the State Legislature passed another ban on same-sex marriage. The statutes read: "marriage is a civil contract between a male and a female person". Wyoming law also states that "all marriage contracts which are valid by the laws of the country in which contracted are valid in this state" and it does not qualify that statement. Lawsuits have cited this provision when challenging the state's denial of recognition to same-sex marriages established in other jurisdictions. On February 22, 2007, a bill to prohibit Wyoming from recognizing same-sex marriages from other states was defeated by one vote in a committee of the Wyoming House of Representatives. On January 24, 2011, the House passed a bill that would have prohibited the state from recognizing same-sex marriages performed outside the state. On February 18, it was passed by the Senate, but after further legislative action it failed.

In 2009, the House considered an amendment to the State Constitution, House Joint Resolution 17, known as the "Defense of Marriage" resolution, defining marriage as a "union between a man and a woman". After an intense, emotional debate on the matter, the measure was defeated by the House on February 6, with 35 votes against and 25 in favor. On January 27, 2011, the Senate approved a constitutional amendment banning same-sex marriage by a two-thirds majority. The proposal died when the House adjourned without taking action. Speaker Tom Lubnau said he "didn't want to spend hours of floor time debating a bill that didn't have the votes to pass". The Wyoming Democratic Party opposed the bill; "[We don't] think it was an appropriate thing to put in the Wyoming Constitution", said Brianna Jones, the party's communication director.

== Legislative efforts ==
Same-sex marriage in the United States

On January 28, 2011, the House Judiciary Committee rejected a bill to legalize same-sex civil unions. On January 14, 2013, legislators filed a bill to legalize same-sex marriage in Wyoming by defining marriage as a civil contract between "two natural persons". On January 28, a House committee defeated the marriage bill by a vote of 4–5. A domestic partnership bill allowing same-sex couples to "obtain the rights, responsibilities, protections and legal benefits provided in Wyoming for immediate family members" was passed by a House committee on a vote of 7–2 on January 28. Legislators who favored same-sex marriage supported the legislative tactic of offering the alternatives. Governor Matt Mead said he favored domestic partnerships. The House rejected the bill on January 30, 2013 in a 24–35 vote. The House considered another same-sex marriage bill in 2014, but defeated it on February 13, 2014 by a vote of 17–41.

== Lawsuits ==
=== Guzzo v. Mead ===
On October 7, 2014, after the U.S. Supreme Court declined appeals in two cases from the Tenth Circuit Court of Appeals, Kitchen v. Herbert and Bishop v. Smith, allowing decisions invalidating state bans on same-sex marriage in Utah and Oklahoma to become binding precedent on courts in Wyoming, four same-sex couples and Wyoming Equality filed a lawsuit in federal court, Guzzo v. Mead, asking for an immediate order to end the state's denial of marriage rights to same-sex couples. Three of the couples had earlier initiated a lawsuit in state court and the fourth had just been denied a marriage license. They were represented by private attorneys and the National Center for Lesbian Rights. In response to the Supreme Court's action, Governor Matt Mead said that the Attorney General, Peter K. Michael, "[would] continue to defend Wyoming's constitution defining marriage between a man and a woman", mistakenly referring to the State Constitution, which does not define marriage. Clerks in Laramie, Natrona and Teton counties said they had received inquiries about issuing marriage licenses to same-sex couples, but were waiting for a change in state law or an order from a judge. U.S. District Judge Scott W. Skavdahl ruled for the plaintiffs on October 17 and stayed enforcement of his ruling until 5 p.m. MDT on October 23 or until the defendants informed the court that they would not appeal to the Tenth Circuit, whichever was first. Governor Mead's office released a statement that the state would decline to appeal the ruling, and notified the court on October 21 of that decision, at which point the judge lifted his stay and same-sex couples began obtaining marriage licenses. Wyoming is also required to recognize same-sex marriages from other jurisdictions. Judge Skavdahl ruled:

The Plaintiff couples are residents of Wyoming who experience the same joys and challenges of family life as their neighbors, co-workers, and other community members who may marry freely and whose legal marriages are respected under Wyoming law. The Plaintiff couples, and other same-sex couples represented in interest by Wyoming Equality, are productive, contributing citizens who support their families and nurture their children, but must do so without the same legal shelter, dignity, and respect afforded by Wyoming to other families through access to the universally celebrated status of marriage. Wyoming's exclusion of the Plaintiffs from marriage, and Defendants' enforcement of that exclusion, as well as Wyoming's refusal to respect the marriages of legally married same-sex couples from other jurisdictions, subject the Plaintiff couples to an inferior "second class" status as Wyoming citizens relative to the rest of the community. These laws deprive the Plaintiff couples and their children of equal dignity, security, and legal protections afforded to other Wyoming families.

Jeran Artery of Wyoming Equality welcomed the court decision, and said, "I wonder what Matthew Shepard would think if he were alive today to see all this progress we've made in Wyoming and how hearts and minds have changed. I would really hope that if I could have a conversation with him that he would say, 'Job well done. You are changing Wyoming and it makes me proud.'" Representative Gerald Gay said the issue should have been decided by voters. Among the first couples to receive a marriage license in Wyoming were Linda Mahaffey and Teresa Bingham, plaintiffs in Guzzo, who obtained a license in Laramie on Tuesday morning, October 21. Travis Gray and Dirk Andrews were the first couple to be issued a license in Casper, and A.J. McDaniel and Jennifer Mumaugh, also plaintiffs in Guzzo, were the first in Cheyenne, the state capital. On June 26, 2015, the U.S. Supreme Court ruled in Obergefell v. Hodges that same-sex couples have a constitutional right to marry under the Due Process and Equal Protection clauses of the Fourteenth Amendment, legalizing same-sex marriage nationwide in the United States.

=== Courage v. Wyoming ===
On March 5, 2014, four same-sex couples and Wyoming Equality filed a lawsuit, Courage v. Wyoming, in the First Judicial District, challenging Wyoming's statutory ban on same-sex marriage and the recognition of same-sex marriages performed in other jurisdictions. The plaintiffs were couples from Cheyenne, Casper, Laramie and Evanston who had married in Canada or Iowa or who had been denied marriages licenses by the Laramie County clerk. In April, former Senator Alan Simpson expressed his support for same-sex marriage, releasing a video in association with Freedom to Marry, "Whether you're gay or lesbian or straight, if you love someone and you want to marry them, marry them. [...] I'm a Republican. The party's basic core is, government out of your life and the right to be left alone." The state sought to dismiss the case, and on July 1, 2014 the plaintiffs sought summary judgment. On July 29, a judge denied the state's request for a stay of proceedings, but deferred a hearing on the motion for summary judgment for 90 days to give the state an opportunity to conduct discovery. On October 6, a joint motion was filed to lift the stay and enter judgement.

=== Christiansen v. Christiansen ===
In November 2010, a district judge ruled that he lacked jurisdiction to grant a divorce to two Wyoming women who had married in Canada in 2006. On June 6, 2011, the Wyoming Supreme Court, in Christiansen v. Christiansen, unanimously reversed the district court decision and granted the divorce. Its decision said: "Nothing in this opinion should be taken as applying to the recognition of same-sex marriages legally solemnized in a foreign jurisdiction in any context other than divorce. The question of recognition of such same-sex marriages for any other reason, being not properly before us, is left for another day."

== Developments after legalization ==
In March 2017, the Wyoming Supreme Court issued a ruling 3–2 discipling a judge, Ruth Neely from Pinedale, who had, in violation of her oath of office, said she would not marry same-sex couples. Neely had informed a local newspaper in 2015 that she would "not be able to" perform the marriages due to her religious beliefs, and compared homosexuality to alcoholism and theft. The Wyoming Commission on Judicial Conduct and Ethics opened an investigation, and concluded that Neely had violated the Wyoming Code of Judicial Conduct and recommended that she be removed from her judicial position: "Judges do not enjoy the same freedom to proselytize their religious beliefs as ordinary citizens." The commission said that her statement amounted to a conclusion that "adherence to the law is optional". Neely appealed directly to the Supreme Court in August 2016. The court rejected Neely's claims but modified her penalty, issuing instead a "public censure" and demanding that she either marry all couples, regardless of sexual orientation, or none.

On February 14, 2018, two Republican representatives, Lars Lone and Roy Edwards, introduced the Marriage and Constitution Restoration Act to the Wyoming House of Representatives. The bill sought to reenact the state's same-sex marriage ban, and ban the state's political subdivisions from "granting, endorsing, respecting or recognizing any marriage not between a man and woman". The bill would have thus been in violation of Obergefell and the U.S. Constitution. House lawmakers refused to consider the bill and killed it merely two days after its introduction to the House.

== Native American nations ==
The Indian Civil Rights Act primarily aims to protect the rights of Native Americans but also reinforces the principle of tribal self-governance. While it does not grant sovereignty, the Act affirms the authority of tribes to govern their own legal affairs. Consequently, many tribes have enacted their own marriage and family laws. As a result, the Supreme Court's Obergefell ruling did not automatically apply to tribal jurisdictions. Same-sex marriage is recognized on the Wind River Indian Reservation, a Native American reservation shared by the Eastern Shoshone and the Arapaho. The first same-sex marriage at the Shoshone and Arapaho Tribal Court in Fort Washakie was registered on November 14, 2014 for Saun and Renee Allen. The Shoshone and Arapaho Domestic Relations Code states that "to the extent they are not inconsistent with this act, the laws of the State of Wyoming shall apply to all matters concerning the creation of marriage, marital rights and obligations, annulments and marriages which are void or voidable."

Native Americans have deep-rooted marriage traditions, placing a strong emphasis on community, family and spiritual connections. While there are no records of same-sex marriages being performed in Native American cultures in the way they are commonly defined in Western legal systems, many Indigenous communities recognize identities and relationships that may be placed on the LGBT spectrum. Among these are two-spirit individuals—people who embody both masculine and feminine qualities. In some cultures, two-spirit individuals assigned male at birth wear women's clothing and engage in household and artistic work associated with the feminine sphere. Historically, this identity sometimes allowed for unions between two people of the same biological sex. Arapaho culture traditionally regarded two-spirit people as "esteemed persons with special spiritual powers". They are known as hoxúx (pronounced [hɔxʊ́x], plural: hoxúxuno) in the Arapaho language. Many hoxúxuno married cisgender men without indication of polygyny. In the eastern dialect of the Shoshone language, two-spirit people, who "act like women" and historically did women's work, are known as waipenaiteN, but unlike the Arapaho hoxúx, they would never marry.

== Economic impact ==
The Williams Institute estimated in September 2014 that if marriage were extended to same-sex couples in Wyoming, the state would see an economic boost of $2.4 million over the course of three years. This net impact would be the result of savings in expenditures on state means-tested public benefit programs and an increase in state income and sales tax revenue.

== Demographics and marriage statistics ==
Data from the 2000 U.S. census showed that 807 same-sex couples were living in Wyoming. By 2005, this had increased to 1,044 couples, likely attributed to same-sex couples' growing willingness to disclose their partnerships on government surveys. Same-sex couples lived in all counties of the state and constituted 0.7% of coupled households and 0.4% of all households in the state. Most couples lived in Natrona, Laramie and Fremont counties, but the counties with the highest percentage of same-sex couples were Niobrara (0.69% of all county households) and Fremont (0.65%). Same-sex partners in Wyoming were on average younger than opposite-sex partners, and less likely to be employed. The average and median household incomes of same-sex couples were lower than different-sex couples, and same-sex couples were also far less likely to own a home than opposite-sex partners. 20% of same-sex couples in Wyoming were raising children under the age of 18, with an estimated 501 children living in households headed by same-sex couples in 2005.

On October 21, 2015, exactly one year after the ruling in Guzzo v. Mead, the Vital Statistics Services office of the Wyoming Department of Health estimated that 201 marriage licenses had been issued to same-sex couples in the state. This constituted about 5% of the 3,850 marriage licenses issued in Wyoming in that time.

The 2020 U.S. census showed that there were 681 married same-sex couple households (271 male couples and 410 female couples) and 473 unmarried same-sex couple households in Wyoming.

== Public opinion ==
Public opinion for same-sex marriage in Wyoming
Poll source	Dates administered	Sample size	Margin of error	Support	Opposition	Do not know / refused
Public Religion Research Institute	February 28 – December 8, 2025	157 adults	?	58%	39%	3%
Public Religion Research Institute	March 13 – December 2, 2024	162 adults	?	62%	37%	1%
Public Religion Research Institute	March 9 – December 7, 2023	157 adults	?	62%	36%	2%
Public Religion Research Institute	March 11 – December 14, 2022	?	?	62%	38%	<0.5%
Public Religion Research Institute	March 8 – November 9, 2021	?	?	58%	41%	1%
Public Religion Research Institute	January 7 – December 20, 2020	105 adults	?	75%	17%	8%
Public Religion Research Institute	April 5 – December 23, 2017	236 adults	?	62%	30%	8%
Public Religion Research Institute	May 18, 2016 – January 10, 2017	244 adults	?	49%	39%	12%
Public Religion Research Institute	April 29, 2015 – January 7, 2016	213 adults	?	48%	43%	9%
Public Religion Research Institute	April 2, 2014 – January 4, 2015	123 adults	?	41%	49%	10%
University of Wyoming	October 13–28, 2014	768 adults	± 4.0%	53%	39%	8%
Public Policy Polling	July 19–21, 2013	1,203 registered voters	± 2.8%	32%	57%	11%

In 2004, the Williams Institute estimated public support for same-sex marriage in Wyoming at 26% (± 5%), and in 2012 at 41% (± 7%). The July 2013 Public Policy Polling survey found that 57% of Wyoming voters thought same-sex marriage should be illegal, while 32% thought it should be legal and 11% were not sure. A separate question on the same survey found that 64% of respondents supported legal recognition for same-sex couples, with 28% supporting same-sex marriage, 36% supporting civil unions but not marriage, 32% opposing all legal recognition and 4% being undecided.

== See also ==
- LGBT rights in Wyoming
- Same-sex marriage in the United States
