= 2006 Tennessee Amendment 1 =

Referendum to ban same-sex marriage

Amendment 1
- November 7, 2006
- Tennessee Marriage Protection Act

Results
Choice	Votes	%
Yes	1,419,434	81.25%
No	327,536	18.75%
Valid votes	1,746,970	100.00%
Invalid or blank votes	0	0.00%
Total votes	1,746,970	100.00%
Registered voters/turnout	3,738,703	49.97%
- Yes: 50–60% 60–70% 70–80% 80–90% 90%+ No: 50–60% 60–70% 70–80% Tie: 50%

The Tennessee Marriage Protection Amendment, also known as Tennessee Amendment 1 of 2006, is a U.S. state constitutional amendment banning same-sex unions. The referendum was approved by 81% of voters. It specified that only a marriage between a man and a woman could be legally recognized in the state of Tennessee. This prohibited same-sex marriages within the state, reinforcing previously existing statutes to the same effect until it was overturned by the Obergefell v. Hodges ruling in June 2015.

== Introduction and approval ==
A car with a bumper sticker in support of Amendment 1

A sign in opposition to Amendment 1

In order for an amendment to the Tennessee State Constitution to be fully ratified, it must be approved by both houses of the Tennessee General Assembly for two successive legislative sessions. It is then put on the ballot as a referendum in the next gubernatorial election, where it must be approved by an absolute majority of those voting in the election.

The amendment was first proposed in the Tennessee House of Representatives on March 17, 2004, as House Joint Resolution 990 (HJR 990), sponsored by TNGA Rep. Bill Dunn (R, Knoxville) The House of Representatives approved HJR 990 on May 6, 2004, by a vote of eighty-five to five. The measure received Senate approval on May 19, 2004, by a vote of twenty-eight to one. After the 2004 election, the amendment was introduced in the Tennessee Senate as Senate Joint Resolution 31 (SJR 31). The Senate approved the measure on February 28, 2005, by a vote of twenty-nine to three, and the House of Representatives approved the measure on March 17, 2005, by a vote of eighty-eight to seven. The amendment was then slated to be submitted to voters as a referendum during the 2006 gubernatorial election.

On April 21, 2005, a lawsuit was filed by the American Civil Liberties Union of Tennessee, the Tennessee Equality Project, and other plaintiffs, claiming that the amendment had not been published in a timely manner between legislative sessions as the state constitution required; specifically, that its newspaper publication had occurred only four months prior to the legislative election in November 2004 rather than the required six. This suit was dismissed at the appellate court level in March 2006 on the grounds that the legislature's intent to put the amendment before voters in November 2006 was widely reported in the media, meeting this requirement in spirit if not in letter. This decision was in turn appealed to the Tennessee Supreme Court. The Tennessee Supreme Court rejected the ACLU's case in July 2006, stating that the plaintiffs did not show adequate standing to bring the lawsuit, thereby clearing the way for the amendment to appear on the November ballot.

Polls conducted prior to the election showed widespread support for the amendment. According to a Mason-Dixon poll released one month before the election, seventy-three percent of registered Tennessee voters supported the amendment, twenty percent opposed it, and seven percent were undecided.

== Text of the amendment ==
The amendment appeared on ballots as Constitutional Amendment #1. The text of the amendment states:

The historical institution and legal contract solemnizing the relationship of one man and one woman shall be the only legally recognized marital contract in this state. Any policy or law or judicial interpretation, purporting to define marriage as anything other than the historical institution and legal contract between one man and one woman is contrary to the public policy of this state and shall be void and unenforceable in Tennessee. If another state or foreign jurisdiction issues a license for persons to marry and if such marriage is prohibited in this state by the provisions of this section, then the marriage shall be void and unenforceable in this state.

== Results ==
The amendment passed by a large margin. 81.25% of voters participating in the election, or almost 31% of eligible voters in the state, approved the amendment and 18.75% of election participants opposed it.

Constitutional Amendment 1
Choice	Votes	%
For	1,419,434	81.25
Against	327,536	18.75
Total	1,746,970	100.00
Source: Tennessee Secretary of State – Tennessee 2006 election results

All 95 counties of Tennessee voted for the amendment.

== Pre-decision opinion polls ==
Date of opinion poll	Conducted by	Sample size	In favor	Against	Undecided	Margin	Margin of Error	Source
September 2006	Chattanooga Times-Free Press/Memphis Commercial Appeal	?	73%	20%	?	53% pro	?	

== See also ==
- Same-sex marriage in the United States
- Same-sex marriage legislation in the United States
- Same-sex marriage legislation in the United States by state
- Same-sex marriage in the United States public opinion
- List of U.S. state laws on same-sex unions
- Federal Marriage Amendment
- 2006 Tennessee elections
