= Same-sex marriage in Georgia (U.S. state) =

Same-sex marriage has been legal in the U.S. state of Georgia since the U.S. Supreme Court's ruling in Obergefell v. Hodges on June 26, 2015. Attorney General Sam Olens quickly announced that Georgia would "adhere to the ruling of the Court", and the first couple married just one hour after the ruling was handed down. A lawsuit challenging the state's ban on same-sex marriages, Inniss v. Aderhold, which had been filed in the U.S. District Court for the Northern District of Georgia in April 2014, was dismissed as moot following the Supreme Court ruling.

Previously, Georgia had banned same-sex marriage both by statute and its State Constitution since 2004. Polling suggests that a majority of Georgia residents support the legal recognition of same-sex marriage, with a 2023 Public Religion Research Institute poll showing that 61% of residents supported same-sex marriage.

== Legal restrictions ==
=== Statutes ===
While unenforceable, state statutes ban same-sex marriage and prohibit the recognition of same-sex marriages performed in other jurisdictions. The ban was struck down by the U.S. Supreme Court in Obergefell v. Hodges on June 26, 2015. Georgia's statutory prohibition on same-sex marriage, though unenforceable, remains on the books and has not been explicitly repealed. Following the overturning of Roe v. Wade in June 2022 by the U.S. Supreme Court, several state lawmakers expressed concern that Obergefell could be at risk. Representative Sam Park said, "The same-sex marriage ban is still on the books, and my understanding is that it would go into effect if the Supreme Court overturns the Obergefell opinion." Governor Brian Kemp said he personally opposed same-sex marriage but that "Dobbs' majority opinion states that Obergefell is settled". Stacey Abrams, Kemp's opponent in the 2022 gubernatorial election, pledged to "codify marriage equality into our state's laws".

=== Constitutional amendment ===
On November 2, 2004, voters passed Amendment 1, a constitutional amendment banning same-sex marriage. The referendum was approved by 76% of voters. On May 17, 2006, Fulton County Superior Court Judge Constance C. Russell ruled that Amendment 1 violated procedural rules of the Constitution of Georgia that ballot questions should be limited to a single subject. Russell said, "People who believe marriages between men and women should have a unique and privileged place in our society may also believe that same-sex relationships should have some place although not marriage. The single-subject rule protects the right of those people to hold both views and reflect both judgments by their vote." Governor Sonny Perdue said, "The people of Georgia knew exactly what they were doing when an overwhelming 76 percent voted in support of this constitutional amendment. It is sad that a single judge has chosen to reverse this decision", and announced plans to appeal to the Georgia Supreme Court. On July 7, 2006, the Supreme Court reversed the lower court ruling and declared the 2004 constitutional amendment valid in Perdue v. O'Kelley.

On February 10, 2025, 20 Democratic lawmakers introduced an unsuccessful resolution to the Georgia State Senate to repeal the constitutional ban. Representative RaShaun Kemp, a sponsor of the legislation, said, "The current Georgia Constitution does not recognize same-sex marriage, a reflection of the past and an outdated way of thinking. Right now, the state must follow federal law, which allows my marriage to be recognized. But we must act at the state level to protect these rights." If approved, the measure would have been placed on the ballot for approval by voters.

== Lawsuits ==
=== Burns v. Burns ===
On January 30, 2001, Fulton County Superior Court Judge Larry Salmon ruled against a same-sex couple, Susan Burns and Debra Freer, who sought recognition of their Vermont civil union. The case, Burns v. Burns, arose from a child custody consent decree in which Burns and her ex-partner, Darian Burns, agreed that neither parent would host an overnight adult guest in their home while the children were present, unless the parent and the guest were "legally married" or related. In July 2020, the couple entered into a civil union, but two months later Darian Burns filed a motion for contempt, arguing that Susan Burns had violated the consent decree. Judge Salmon ruled that a civil union could not be recognized in Georgia as equivalent to a marriage. On January 23, 2002, the Georgia Court of Appeals upheld the ruling and declared civil unions invalid in the state, and the Georgia Supreme Court denied review in July 2002.

=== Inniss v. Aderhold ===
Same-sex marriage in the United States

On April 22, 2014, three same-sex couples and a widow, represented by Lambda Legal, filed a lawsuit in the U.S. District Court for the Northern District of Georgia on behalf of themselves and all unmarried same-sex couples and all state residents who had married same-sex spouses in other jurisdictions. Another couple was later added to the suit, which was assigned to Judge William S. Duffey Jr. Two of the four couples had married in Connecticut and New Hampshire. The suit, Inniss v. Aderhold, named Deborah Aderhold, the State Registrar and Director of Vital Records, as the principal defendant. The Attorney General of Georgia, Sam Olens, filed a motion to dismiss in September 2014, and the defendants later argued for an extension to file their briefs because of the volatility of same-sex marriage cases around the country. Judge Duffey granted an extension to October 22, 2014. On January 8, 2015, Judge Duffey denied the defendants' motion to dismiss. He found that the plaintiffs were asserting they had a fundamental right to marry a partner of the same sex, which was not a right protected by the Due Process Clause of the U.S. Constitution. Since a fundamental right was not at issue, he explained he would assess Georgia's ban under the least restrictive standard of review, rational basis. He denied the motion to dismiss because the state defendants had not yet met the rational basis standard by explaining the link between Georgia's ban on same-sex marriage and the state's interest in "child welfare and procreation".

On January 20, 2015, the defendants asked Judge Duffey to suspend proceedings until the U.S. Supreme Court ruled in pending same-sex marriage cases, and the plaintiffs supported that request on January 27. On January 29, the court suspended some proceedings, but allowed the parties to appeal his earlier order to the Eleventh Circuit Court of Appeals, so that court would have a wider set of arguments to consider along with the Florida case, Brenner v. Scott. On June 26, 2015, the Supreme Court ruled in Obergefell v. Hodges that the Due Process and Equal Protection clauses of the Fourteenth Amendment guarantee same-sex couples the right to marry. The decision legalized same-sex marriage nationwide in the United States. Governor Nathan Deal said, "While I believe that this issue should be decided by the states and by legislatures, not the federal judiciary, I also believe in the rule of law...The state of Georgia is subject to the laws of the United States, and we will follow them." Attorney General Olens also said he opposed the court ruling but that "Georgia will follow the law and adhere to the ruling of the Court". He instructed state agencies and state employees to treat same-sex couples equally to different-sex couples, and instructed county clerks to issue marriage licenses to same-sex couples. All counties began immediately issuing marriage licenses to same-sex couples or announced their intention to do so.

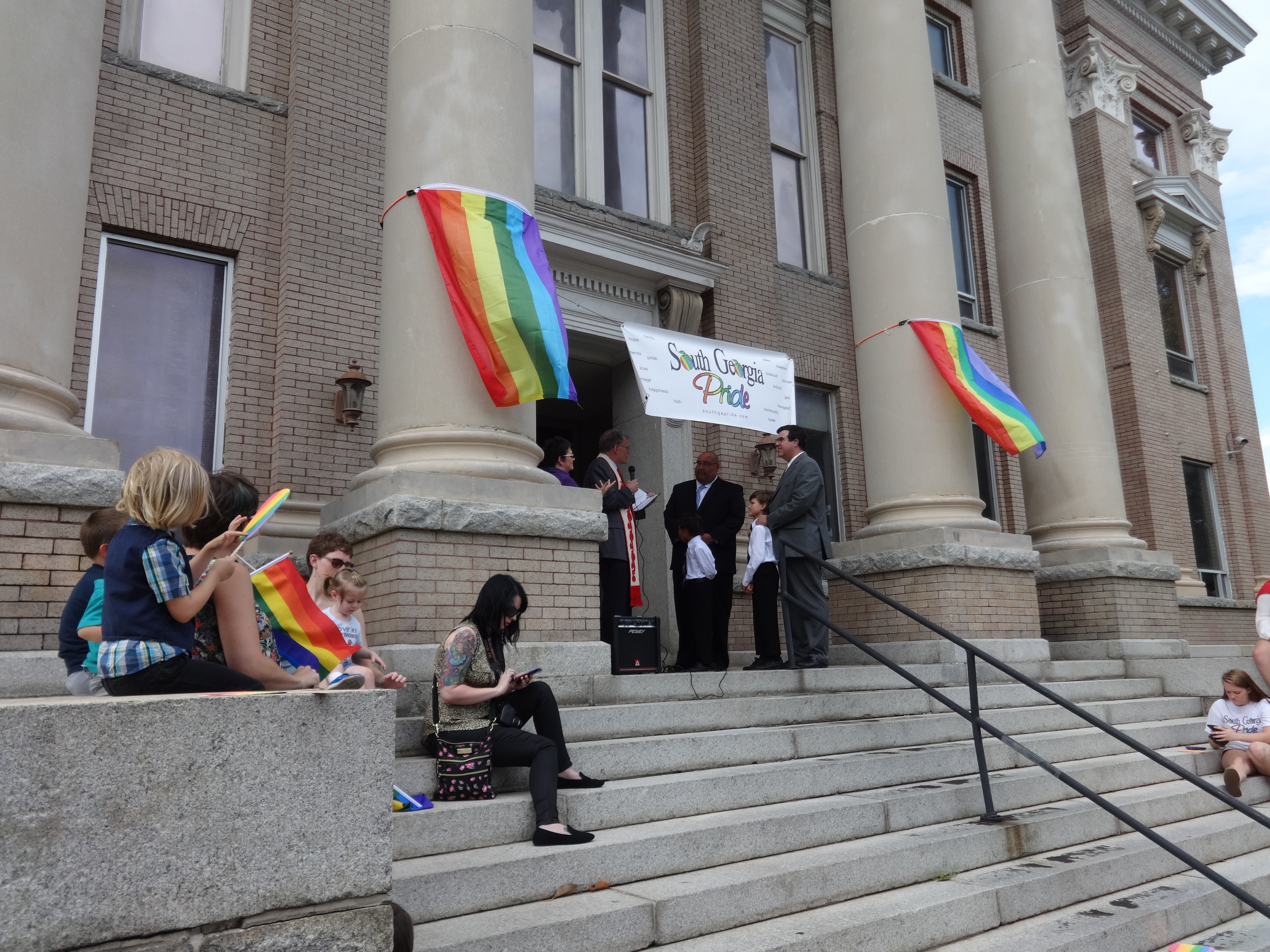
Ramon Perez and Levy Hires-Perez exchanging vows at the Lowndes County Courthouse in Valdosta, June 26, 2015

Emma Foulkes and Petrina Bloodworth were the first same-sex couple to marry in Georgia just one hour after the Supreme Court's ruling. Fulton County Judge Jane Morrison officiated at their marriage at the Fulton County Courthouse in Atlanta. Mayor Kasim Reed said, "Today is a historic occasion for the City of Atlanta, for Georgia and for America. The Supreme Court's ruling marks a momentous victory for freedom, equality, and love. It is clear that the arc of history continues to bend ever closer toward justice." Jeff Graham, the executive director of Georgia Equality, issued the following statement: "The United States Supreme Court has ruled in favor of the freedom to marry across the nation. It's a national victory – and it means that soon, thousands of loving, committed couples throughout the United States – including our state of Georgia – will be able to say 'I do' and at last be respected under the law." Christie and Kindra Baer, a couple for 13 years, were the first to receive a marriage license in Savannah, and Moriah Martin and Jordyn Dolente were the first to marry in Athens just after 2 p.m. at the Clarke County Courthouse. Taylor Nash and Kelly Martinelli were the first same-sex couple to marry in Gwinnett County. Representative John Lewis welcomed the court ruling, saying, "Races don't fall in love, genders don't fall in love--people fall in love", and Representative Hank Johnson called it "historic". Bernice King, CEO of The King Center and daughter of Martin Luther King Jr., said, "It is my sincere prayer that this ruling helps to alleviate violence, in all forms, including physical force, toward our LGBT brothers and sisters; and that the Supreme Court ruling encourages the global community to respect and embrace all LGBT global citizens with dignity and love. In the words of our founder and my mother, Coretta Scott King, 'The Civil Rights Movement that I believe in thrives on unity and inclusion, not division and exclusion.'" State Senator Vincent Fort said the decision was "a victory not just for the LGBT community but for all Americans who believe in justice", and Rob Wright, the Episcopal Bishop of Atlanta, said, "In the days ahead, whatever your position, I ask you to keep close to your heart and lips the words of scripture, that "God is love." Christ's church is trans-political, above all earthly partisanship. Therefore, if love has won even a small victory today, then let us rejoice."

Inniss was dismissed as moot by the district court in October 2015, which entered judgment in favor of the plaintiffs, "making clear that Georgia's laws denying marriage to same-sex couples are unconstitutional and unenforceable".

== Demographics and marriage statistics ==
Data from the 2000 U.S. census showed that 19,288 same-sex couples were living in Georgia. By 2005, this had increased to 24,424 couples, likely attributed to same-sex couples' growing willingness to disclose their partnerships on government surveys. Same-sex couples lived in all counties of the state and constituted 1.1% of coupled households and 0.6% of all households in the state. Most couples lived in Fulton, DeKalb and Cobb counties. Same-sex partners in Georgia were on average younger than opposite-sex partners, and more likely to be employed. In addition, the average and median household incomes of same-sex couples were higher than different-sex couples, but same-sex couples were far less likely to own a home than opposite-sex partners. 20% of same-sex couples in Georgia were raising children under the age of 18, with an estimated 8,852 children living in households headed by same-sex couples in 2005.

The 2020 U.S. census showed that there were 20,985 married same-sex couple households (9,578 male couples and 11,407 female couples) and 16,455 unmarried same-sex couple households in Georgia.

== Domestic partnerships ==
A few municipal entities, including Athens, Atlanta, Avondale Estates, Clarkston, Decatur, Doraville, East Point, Savannah, Pine Lake, and DeKalb and Fulton counties, have established a domestic partnership registry for city or county employees, providing some limited health care benefits.

== Public opinion ==
Public opinion for same-sex marriage in Georgia
Poll source	Dates administered	Sample size	Margin of error	Support	Opposition	Do not know / refused
Public Religion Research Institute	February 28 – December 8, 2025	573 adults	?	54%	40%	6%
Public Religion Research Institute	March 13 – December 2, 2024	565 adults	?	55%	39%	6%
Public Religion Research Institute	March 9 – December 7, 2023	546 adults	?	61%	36%	3%
Public Religion Research Institute	March 11 – December 14, 2022	?	?	62%	36%	2%
Public Religion Research Institute	March 8 – November 9, 2021	?	?	60%	37%	3%
Public Religion Research Institute	January 7 – December 20, 2020	1,770 adults	?	61%	32%	7%
Public Religion Research Institute	April 5 – December 23, 2017	2,171 adults	?	52%	39%	9%
Public Religion Research Institute	May 18, 2016 – January 10, 2017	2,928 adults	?	51%	38%	11%
Public Religion Research Institute	April 29, 2015 – January 7, 2016	2,393 adults	?	45%	47%	8%
Public Religion Research Institute	April 2, 2014 – January 4, 2015	1,657 adults	?	44%	47%	9%
The Atlanta Journal-Constitution	September 12–17, 2013	801 adults	± 5.0%	48%	43%	9%
Rosetta Stone Communications/Landmark Communications	May 10, 2012	600 voters	± 4.0%	27%	59%	14%

== See also ==
- LGBT rights in Georgia (U.S. state)
- Same-sex marriage in the United States
