= Williams Institute =

American research institute

- Williams Institute on Sexual Orientation and Gender Identity Law and Public Policy
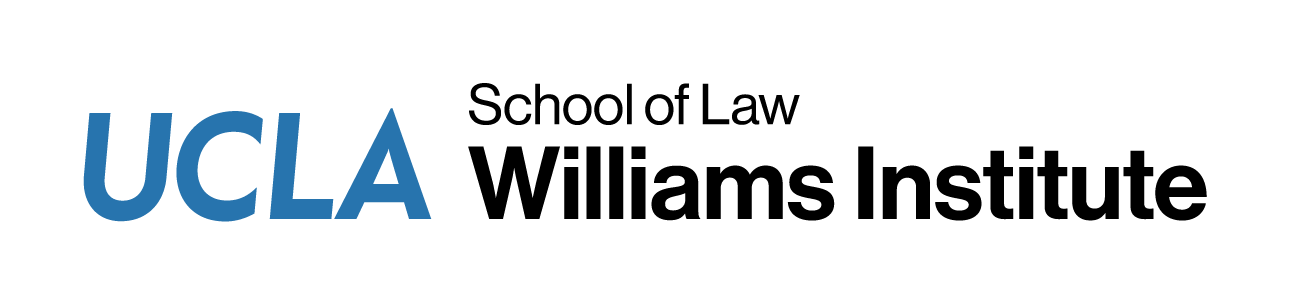
- Named after: Charles R. "Chuck" Williams
- Founded: 2001; 25 years ago
- Type: Research institute
- Location: Los Angeles, California, US
- Executive director: Jocelyn Samuels
- Employees: 20–30
- Website: williamsinstitute.law.ucla.edu

The Williams Institute is a public policy research institute based at the UCLA School of Law focused on sexual orientation and gender identities issues (SOGI).

== History ==
The Williams Institute was founded in 2001 through a grant by Charles R. "Chuck" Williams. Williams's inaugural donation of $2.5 million to create the institute was the largest donation ever given to any academic institution in support of an LGBT academic program in any discipline. In 2013, Williams donated an additional $5.5 million to support the institute.

The Williams Project was founded to replace the pervasive bias against LGBT people in law, policy, and culture with independent research on LGBT issues. In 2006, the Williams Project merged with the Institute for Gay & Lesbian Strategic Studies, becoming the Williams Institute.

== Focus ==
The Williams Institute's work covers a wide range of issues impacting LGBTQ people, including demographics and data collection, discrimination and violence, criminalization, family formation and parenting, health and socioeconomic disparities, challenges faced by the most vulnerable LGBTQ community members, and global human rights.

== Impact ==
The Williams Institute produces demographic data and public-policy research relevant to the real world.

Examples of the Williams Institute's impact on law and policy include:

- In 2015, Justice Anthony Kennedy cited Williams Institute estimates on the number of same-sex couples raising children as a deciding factor in the landmark decision in Obergefell v. Hodges, which granted marriage equality in the U.S.
- Williams Institute scholars and research have also been cited by the Supreme Court in other landmark LGBTQ rights cases, including Bostock v. Clayton County and the dissent in 303 Creative v. Elenis, as well as in dozens of lower court decisions.
