= 2004 Georgia Amendment 1 =

Referendum banning same-sex marriage

Amendment 1
- November 2, 2004
- Shall the Constitution be amended so as to provide that this state shall recognize as marriage only the union of man and woman?

Results
Choice	Votes	%
Yes	2,454,930	76.15%
No	768,716	23.85%
Valid votes	3,223,646	97.63%
Invalid or blank votes	78,229	2.37%
Total votes	3,301,875	100.00%
Registered voters/turnout	4,248,837	75.87%
County results
Yes
90–100%
80–90%
70–80%
60–70%
50–60%

Georgia Constitutional Amendment 1 of 2004, is an amendment to the Georgia Constitution that previously made it unconstitutional for the state to recognize or perform same-sex marriages or civil unions. The referendum was approved by 76% of the voters.

The text of the amendment states:

(a) This state shall recognize as marriage only the union of man and woman. Marriages between persons of the same sex are prohibited in this state.
(b) No union between persons of the same sex shall be recognized by this state as entitled to the benefits of marriage. This state shall not give effect to any public act, record, or judicial proceeding of any other state or jurisdiction respecting a relationship between persons of the same sex that is treated as a marriage under the laws of such other state or jurisdiction. The courts of this state shall have no jurisdiction to grant a divorce or separate maintenance with respect to any such relationship or otherwise to consider or rule on any of the parties' respective rights arising as a result of or in connection with such relationship.

The amendment was challenged in court. On May 16, 2006, a lower court in Georgia struck down the amendment, but on July 7, 2006, the Supreme Court of Georgia overturned the lower court thus leaving the amendment as part of the Georgia Constitution.

As a result of the Supreme Court ruling in Obergefell v. Hodges Amendment 1 was declared unconstitutional on June 26, 2015, legalizing same-sex marriage in Georgia.

== Results ==
Amendment 1
Choice	Votes	%
For	2,454,930	76.15
Against	768,716	23.85
Total	3,223,646	100.00

== See also ==
- LGBT rights in Georgia (U.S. state)
