= 2004 Louisiana Amendment 1 =

Referendum banning same-sex marriage

Constitutional Amendment 1
- 18 September 2004
- Marriage in Louisiana Act

Results
Choice	Votes	%
For	619,908	77.78%
Against	177,067	22.22%
Valid votes	796,975	93.71%
Invalid or blank votes	53,538	6.29%
Total votes	850,513	100.00%
Registered voters/turnout	2,855,561	27.91%
Parish results
Yes
90%–100%
80%–90%
70–80%
50–60%

Louisiana Constitutional Amendment 1 of 2004, is an amendment to the Louisiana Constitution that makes it unconstitutional for the state to recognize or perform same-sex marriages or civil unions. The referendum was approved by 77.78% of the voters.

The text of the amendment states:

Marriage in the state of Louisiana shall consist only of the union of one man and one woman. No official or court of the state of Louisiana shall construe this constitution or any state law to require that marriage or the legal incidents thereof be conferred upon any member of a union other than the union of one man and one woman. A legal status identical or substantially similar to that of marriage for unmarried individuals shall not be valid or recognized. No official or court of the state of Louisiana shall recognize any marriage contracted in any other jurisdiction which is not the union of one man and one woman.
