= Religious Liberty Accommodations Act =

2016 Mississippi law

Protecting Freedom of Conscience from Government Discrimination Act.

Mississippi Legislature
- Long title: An Act To Create The "protecting Freedom Of Conscience From Government Discrimination Act"; To Provide Certain Protections Regarding A Sincerely Held Religious Belief Or Moral Conviction For Persons, Religious Organizations And Private Associations; To Define A Discriminatory Action For Purposes Of This Act; To Provide That A Person May Assert A Violation Of This Act As A Claim Against The Government; To Provide Certain Remedies; To Require A Person Bringing A Claim Under This Act To Do So Not Later Than Two Years After The Discriminatory Action Was Taken; To Provide Certain Definitions; And For Related Purposes.
- Citation: H.B. 1523
- Passed by: Mississippi House of Representatives
- Passed: February 19, 2016
- Passed by: Mississippi State Senate
- Passed: March 30, 2016
- Signed by: Governor Phil Bryant
- Signed: April 5, 2016
- Effective: July 1, 2016; enjoined

Initiating chamber: Mississippi House of Representatives
- Introduced by: Speaker Philip Gunn

Related legislation
- Mississippi Student Religious Liberties Act of 2013; Mississippi Religious Freedom Restoration Act
- Status: In force

Mississippi House Bill 1523 (H.B. 1523), also called the Religious Liberty Accommodations Act or Protecting Freedom of Conscience from Government Discrimination Act, is 2016 state legislation passed in direct response to federal rulings in support of same-sex marriage. MS H.B. 1523 provides protections for persons, religious organizations, and private associations who choose to provide or withhold services discriminatorily in accordance to the three "deeply held religious beliefs or moral convictions" which are specifically outlined in the bill. These protected beliefs are 1) that marriage is and should be an exclusively heterosexual union, 2) sex should not occur outside of marriage, and 3) that biologically-assigned sex is objective and immutably linked to gender.

MS H.B. 1523 protects organizations, companies, and individuals that use any of the aforementioned "deeply held religious beliefs or moral convictions" to justify the choice to deny or offer several different types of services. Individual and organizational decisions that are protected under MS H.B. 1523 include—but are not limited to—issuing marriage licenses, granting adoptions, hiring practices (including state employees), healthcare coverage, housing agreements, as well as specific medical services (including sex reassignment surgery or conversion therapy).

After being passed through Mississippi legislature, H.B. 1523 was originally intended to come into effect on July 1, 2016; however, U.S. District Judge Carlton W. Reeves issued a preliminary injunction blocking the law on June 30. Three days before, he had issued a permanent injunction requiring government officials to issue marriage licenses to same-sex couples regardless of the officials' religious beliefs. On June 23, 2017, the United States Court of Appeals for the Fifth Circuit reversed Reeves' district court decision, holding that the plaintiffs in the lawsuit lacked standing to bring the lawsuit. The Fifth Circuit accordingly lifted the injunctions, allowing the law to go into effect. The Supreme Court declined to hear the case.

== Background ==
On June 26, 2015, the U.S. Supreme Court ruled in Obergefell v. Hodges that the denial of marriage rights to same-sex couples is unconstitutional. This decision legalized same-sex marriage throughout the U.S. (including in Mississippi) and found that the right to marry is a fundamental right within the U.S. and cannot legally be denied to same-sex couples.

On March 31, 2016, U.S. District Judge Daniel Porter Jordan III issued a preliminary injunction striking down the Mississippi's ban on adoption privilege for same-sex couples which had been in effect since 2000, declaring it unconstitutional.

In the aftermath of these federal rulings, House Bill 1523 was introduced. Mississippi legislators created a bill establishing state-specific exemptions to these federal decisions, namely protection for individuals, organizations, and institutions who choose to deny service to LGBT individuals based on religious beliefs. Republican State Senator Jenifer Branning drew a direct connection between Obergefell and H.B. 1523 when she introduced the bill on the Mississippi Senate floor, saying, "this is presenting a solution to the crossroads we find ourselves in today as a result of Obergefell v. Hodges."

== Legislative history ==
Representatives Philip Gunn, William Tracy Arnold, C. Scott Bounds, Lester Carpenter, J. Andrew Gipson, William Shirley, Randy Boyd, and Dan Eubanks officially introduced House Bill 1523, titled "Protecting Freedom of Conscience from Government Discrimination Act".

On February 19, 2016, the Mississippi House of Representatives passed the bill, with 80 ayes, 39 nays, and 3 absent or not voting.

On March 30, 2016, the Mississippi Senate passed an amended bill, with a 32 ayes, 17 nays, and 1 absent or not voting.

On April 1, 2016, the Mississippi House of Representatives passed the bill as amended by the Senate, with 69 ayes, 44 nays, 7 absent or not voting, and 1 voted present.

On April 5, 2016, GovernorPhil Bryant signed the bill. The bill was intended to go into effect on July 1, 2016.

On April 12, 2016, Mississippi state representatives including Rep. Jay Hughes introduced a suspension resolution, titled the Mississippi Economic and Tourism Recovery Act, aimed at repealing HB 1523.

On June 27, 2016, U.S. District Judge Carlton W. Reeves entered a permanent injunction blocking HB 1523's provision allowing county clerks to recuse themselves from issuing marriage licenses.

On June 30, 2016, hours before the law was to come into force, Judge Reeves issued a preliminary injunction blocking the rest of HB 1523.

On July 7, 2016, Governor Phil Bryant filed an appeal against Judge Reeves' preliminary injunction.

On July 13, 2016, Mississippi Attorney General Jim Hood announced his office would not pursue an appeal of Judge Reeves' ruling.

On June 23, 2017, Judge Reeves' injunction was lifted and the law went into effect.

== Response ==
Proponents of H.B. 1523 argue that the bill protects individuals, businesses, and organizations from being discriminated against by the government for enacting their religious beliefs. Another argument of the bill's supporters is that H.B. 1523 is an example of Mississippi enacting exemptions to the federal Obergefell decision through state legislation.

Opponents of H.B. 1523 argue that the bill denies LGBT people of their constitutionally-protected rights. Some claim that this enables individuals, businesses, and organizations to justify discrimination based on sexual orientation, gender identity, or sexual activity. In addition to the bill's implications for same-sex couples and LGBT identified individuals, opponents of the bill have expressed concern about the potential discriminatory effects of H.B. 1523 on single parents and single-parent families as well as individuals who have had premarital sex. On April 5, 2016, the Human Rights Campaign lambasted Mississippi Governor Phil Bryant for signing into law H.B. 1523. A week later, 95 Mississippi writers signed a letter opposing H.B. 1523.; the list of signees includes John Grisham, Donna Tartt, W. Ralph Eubanks, Kiese Laymon, and Greg Iles.

The passing of H.B. 1523 has received criticism and sparked backlash from some Mississippi communities, other municipalities and states, and communities all across the globe.

=== Local Response ===
Several cities within Mississippi have denounced H.B. 1523 and called for its repeal. The Mississippi Economic Council has voiced opposition to H.B. 1523:

"As the State Chamber of Commerce for a state that has proven its hospitable and business-friendly approach, MEC opposes efforts that would intentionally or unintentionally prevent Mississippi businesses from implementing and enforcing non-discrimination policies or that would limit diversity and inclusion impacting their customers and employees. HB 1523 conflicts with this policy."

On April 6, 2016, the Jackson City Council unanimously passed a resolution opposing H.B. 1523. The resolution states that the state's capitol acknowledges that the United States Constitution protects all individuals' rights equally and prohibits governments from preserving religious beliefs over the rights of people. Mayor Tony Yarber released a statement which read: "As a predominantly black city in Mississippi, the Jackson community has endured racism, discrimination and injustice over the years. We are Mississippi's capital city, and as part of our declaration of being the 'Bold New City,' we will not discriminate against any individual because of race, religious beliefs or sexual orientation, nor do we support legislation that allows for such discrimination."

Biloxi, MS also unanimously passed a resolution calling for H.B. 1523's repeal on April 19, 2016. The resolution was originally introduced by Mayor FoFo Gilich.

=== National response ===
States and municipalities banning publicly funded travel to Mississippi: Publicly funded travel banned by state government Publicly funded travel banned by city and state government Publicly funded travel banned by county government Publicly funded travel banned by city and county government Publicly funded travel banned by city government

After the passing of H.B. 1523, several state and local government have issued bans preventing travel to the state of Mississippi. These travel bans are intended to express these communities' opposition to the bill and its effects on Mississippians, particularly LGBT Mississippians. The backlash is similar to what North Carolina experienced after passing the widely controversial "bathroom bill".

As of December 2, 2016, the states of California, Connecticut, Minnesota, New York, Vermont, and Washington, the District of Columbia, the counties of Dane (Wisconsin), Franklin (Ohio), Montgomery (Maryland), and Multnomah (Oregon), and the cities of Baltimore, Berkeley, Cincinnati, Dayton, Honolulu, Long Beach, Los Angeles, Miami Beach, New York City, Oakland, Philadelphia, Portland (Maine), Portland (Oregon), Providence, Salt Lake City, San Francisco, San Jose, Santa Fe, Seattle, Tampa, West Palm Beach, and Wilton Manors have all issued travel bans in response to H.B. 1523, barring government employees from non-essential publicly funded travel to Mississippi.

=== International response ===
In April 2016, the British Foreign and Commonwealth Office issued a warning to LGBT travelers to North Carolina and Mississippi. The Human Rights Campaign responded that it was "both frightening and embarrassing that one of our nation's staunchest allies has warned its citizens of the risks."

On May 12, 2016, the European Union released a statement condemning the Religious Liberty Accommodations Act in Mississippi and the Public Facilities Privacy & Security Act in North Carolina.

== Challenges to H.B. 1523 in the Courts ==
Several different lawsuits have aimed to derail and overturn H.B. 1523. In June 2016 before H.B. 1523 was scheduled to originally go into effect, two lawsuits in U.S. District Court challenged the constitutionality of the bill: Barber v. Bryant and Campaign for Southern Equality v. Bryant. The two cases were consolidated for the preliminary injunction proceedings in U.S. District Court.

=== Barber v. Bryant ===
Barber v. Bryant was brought forward by Mississippi civil rights attorney Robert McDuff and the Mississippi Center for Justice. The plaintiffs of Barber v. Bryant were eleven individual Mississippians and The Joshua Generation Metropolitan Community Church of Hattiesburg, MS. When heard in District Court, the Campaign for Southern Equality v. Bryant case was consolidated under Barber v. Bryant.

On June 27, 2016, U.S. District Judge Carlton W. Reeves entered a permanent injunction blocking HB 1523's provision allowing county clerks to recuse themselves from issuing marriage licenses.

On June 30, 2016, hours before the law was to come into force, Judge Reeves issued a preliminary injunction blocking the rest of HB 1523. In a sixty-page opinion finding that the law violates the Equal Protection Clause and the Establishment Clause of the United States Constitution, Judge Reeves notes HB 1523 singles out Leviticus 18 while ignoring Leviticus's other prohibitions, such as mixing wool and linens. Judge Reeves further compares Governor Bryant's opposition to the Obergefell v. Hodges decision to Governor James P. Coleman's opposition to the Brown v. Board of Education decision.

On July 13, 2016, Mississippi Attorney General Jim Hood announced his office would not pursue an appeal of Judge Reeves' ruling. In a statement, Hood said, "... all HB 1523 has done is tarnish Mississippi's image while distracting us from the more pressing issues of decaying roads and bridges, underfunding of public education, the plight of the mentally ill and the need to solve our state's financial mess." Mississippi Governor Phil Bryant has retained the services of a private attorney, Drew Snyder, to continue the appeal in federal court using private funds.

Governor Phil Bryant and John Davis, executive director of the Mississippi Department of Human Services, appealed the District Court Barber v. Bryant decision to the United States Court of Appeals for the Fifth Circuit.

On June 23, 2017, United States Court of Appeals for the Fifth Circuit found that the Barber v. Bryant plaintiffs lacked standing. An excerpt from Circuit Judge Jerry Edwin Smith's opinion reads: "We do not foreclose the possibility that a future plaintiff may be able to show clear injury-in-fact that satisfies the 'irreducible constitutional minimum of standing,' ... [T]he federal courts must withhold judgment unless and until that plaintiff comes forward. The preliminary injunction is REVERSED, and a judgment of dismissal for want of jurisdiction is RENDERED." The three-judge panel who heard the case (which also included Judge Jennifer Elrod and Judge Catharina Haynes) agreed unanimously. This ruling reversed Judge Reeves' earlier decision in U.S. District Court; thus, H.B. 1523 went into effect.

On behalf of the case's plaintiffs, Robert McDuff appealed the Fifth Circuit decision in Barber v. Bryant to the United States Supreme Court, claiming that the bill violates both the First and Fourteenth Amendments. On January 8, 2018, the U.S. Supreme Court refused to hear the case without comment.

=== Campaign for Southern Equality (CSE) v. Bryant ===
Campaign for Southern Equality v. Bryant was a suit filed in federal district court before H.B. 1523 was even drafted, on October 20, 2014. The plaintiffs were the ACLU and several individual Mississippians represented by Roberta A. Kaplan. CSE v. Bryant challenged Mississippi's statutory and constitutional denial of marriage rights to same-sex couples before the 2015 federal Obergefell decision. The hearing was held on November 12, 2014. The marriage ban was found as unconstitutional by Judge Reeves on November 25, 2014. The case was appealed to the Fifth Circuit Court of Appeals. The Fifth Circuit issued a stay of Judge Reeves' order to issue same-sex marriage licenses. When the federal Obergefell decision legalized same-sex marriage, the Fifth Circuit's stay was overturned and marriage licenses were issued for same-sex couples within Mississippi.

After the passage of H.B. 1523, in May 2016, plaintiffs in the CSE v. Bryant case still represented by Roberta Kaplan filed a motion to reopen the lawsuit in opposition to the bill. Specifically, Kaplan's motion argued that provisions in H.B. 1523 that allow circuit clerk and state workers to recuse themselves from performing their duties are in violation of the Fourteenth Amendment. For the case's hearing in U.S. District Court it was consolidated with Barber v. Bryant.

On July 21, 2016, Attorney Roberta A. Kaplan filed an affidavit to illuminate the role that the conservative legal organization Alliance Defending Freedom played in drafting H.B. 1523.

In September 2017, the U.S. Court of Appeals for the Fifth Circuit denied the petition for a rehearing en banc submitted by the plaintiffs of Campaign for Southern Equality v. Bryant.

In October 2017, the case was appealed to the United States Supreme Court. In January 2018, the U.S. Supreme Court passed on reviewing the CSE v. Bryant Fifth Circuit decision.

=== Alford v. Moulder ===
In May 2016, Nykolas Alford, Stephen Thomas, and the American Civil Liberties Union filed a lawsuit in U.S. District Court against Judy Moulder, a Mississippi state registrar of vital records. Alfred v. Moulder aimed to prevent H.B. 1523 from going into effect, arguing that the bill goes against the federal ruling in favor of same-sex marriage made in the Obergefell decision. On October 17, 2016, the Court stayed Alford v. Moulder pending a decision in Barber v. Bryant from the Fifth Circuit Court of Appeals.

== See also ==
- LGBT rights in Mississippi
