= Camp Sister Spirit =

Former feminist retreat in Mississippi

Camp Sister Spirit was a feminist and lesbian retreat in Ovett, Mississippi, United States. It was established in 1993 by Brenda and Wanda Henson, a lesbian couple from Mississippi. The camp became defunct in or sometime prior to 2021. It attracted national media attention shortly after its establishment due to intense opposition from the local community.

Prior to opening the camp, the Hensons operated a nonprofit organization called Sister Spirit Inc. of Gulfport, Mississippi, which provided assistance to victims of abuse, disbursed food to the needy and sought to address issues regarding domestic violence and racism. In the early 1990s, the group sought to purchase a property to be used for holding workshops and coordinating outreach efforts. In July 1993, they purchased a 120-acre (49 ha) former pig farm in Ovett, a small community in Jones County, Mississippi.

Soon after the purchase of the property, the group faced community opposition, including from local Baptist pastors, who sought to remove the group from the community. Additionally, the property was subject to acts of vandalism, and the group members were harassed. In February 1994, United States Attorney General Janet Reno ordered federal mediators from the Community Relations Service to Ovett, though camp opponents refused to engage in mediation. Following this, camp opponents sued Reno, though their case was ultimately dismissed by a federal judge. Also in 1994, several neighbors of the camp filed a nuisance lawsuit against the organization, though they lost their case in the Mississippi Chancery Courts.

Ultimately, the camp survived community attempts to remove it and, by 2003, it had hosted 5,000 visitors from 12 different countries. However, by that time, Brenda had been diagnosed with cancer, which caused a decline in camp activities. Brenda died in 2008, and Wanda in 2025. By 2021, sources reported that the camp had closed.

== Background ==
Brenda and Wanda Henson were a lesbian couple who, in the early 1990s, considered themselves to be married. (Note: This terminology of their relationship is used in contemporary media coverage of the couple. According to The Washington Post, the two adopted the same last name despite the fact that "their union [was] not recognized by the state of Mississippi". Same-sex marriage in the United States would not become a legal reality until 2004, when Massachusetts became the first state to allow same-sex partners to get married.) Around 1990, the two established Sister Spirit Inc. in Gulfport, Mississippi. (Note: This year comes from an article in the February 8, 1994, issue of The Advocate, which stated that Sister Spirit Inc. had been "founded four years ago". An exact year of founding is not given in the article.) This entity was a 501(c)(3) organization, a nonprofit organization that sought to address issues of civil rights and human rights, including domestic violence and racism. To this end, the organization assisted victims of abuse and, in 1993, distributed roughly 40,000 pounds (18,000 kilograms) of food to the needy. Some of the organizations funding was derived from grants provided by the federal government of the United States. All of the organization's workers were volunteers and consisted of both lesbian and straight women, with lesbians making up about 70 percent of its workforce. The Hensons worked full-time for the organization, with Brenda serving as its executive director. Additionally, Brenda published a newsletter for the organization called The Grapevine.

== Formation ==
In the early 1990s, Sister Spirit oversaw a four-year-long fundraising effort for the purchasing of land in Mississippi, with the goal being to use the property for holding workshops and meetings and for coordinating outreach efforts. Additionally, Sister Spirit intended to rent out the property to other similar groups and allow women passing through the area to use it as a campground. The group also wanted its own property due to issues that they experienced in the past with leasing property. The name of this retreat would be Camp Sister Spirit.

In July 1993, the organization purchased about 120 acres (49 hectares) of land in Ovett, Mississippi, a small municipality with a population of several hundred. (Note: Sources vary on the population of Ovett at the time that Camp Sister Spirit was organized, with values of 200, 250, 300, 400, 1,200. and 1,400.) Most of the population was Christian, with many practicing Christian fundamentalism. The property, which cost $60,000 (equivalent to $134,000 in 2025), was formerly a pig farm. It was located in a wooded area, near the De Soto National Forest, and was connected to the road system by a logging road. At the time of the purchase, the property contained several barns and an old house. Its previous owner did not live on the property, but allowed nearby residents to use it as a hunting camp.

Work on preparing the site began in August 1993, with the Hensons living on the property with about 20 other women. The camp officially launched in late 1993. (Note: Sources vary on when the camp opened. In a 2020 book, the month is given as August 1993, while a 1994 article in The Advocate gives the month as November 1993.) As part of their involvement with the local community, the Hensons stated that they intended to operate food banks and hold drives to promote literacy and preventive healthcare, among other things.

== Community opposition ==
The purchase was discussed in the October 1993 issue of The Grapevine, and while the newsletter was intended only for members of Sister Spirit, a local resident of Ovett obtained a copy. Soon after, the local media was made aware of the purchase and several thousand copies of the newsletter were distributed throughout the region, including at churches, factories, and grocery stores. Many citizens expressed outrage at the purchase and, in particular, a part of the newsletter that referenced the building of a "lesbian community". According to Brenda, this was a misunderstanding, as the group intended to have no more than five or six full-time caretakers live on the property. Discussing this in an article of The Advocate magazine, Brenda said:

It was never, ever going to be a women's-land [sic] situation. That was a misunderstanding; there are no plans for that. But what if it was going to be a lesbian community? So what! We bought the land.

The Hensons and their organization also faced opposition from religious leaders in the community, primarily from the pastors of local Baptist churches. One such pastor, John S. Allen from nearby Richton, Mississippi, said that he hoped that the Hensons would abandon their "lesbian lifestyle" and embrace a "biblical lifestyle" and that, if they did not, that the camp would be removed from the community. The opposition to the camp from Baptist leaders was supported by Representative Michael Parker, who represented Jones County, Mississippi, in the United States House of Representatives. Wanda responded to the local religious community by saying that her relationship with Brenda was honored by their religion—Unitarian Universalism—and that the "Fundamentalists" lacked the right to force their religious interpretation on them.

=== Vandalism and threats ===
On November 8, 1993, the Hensons found that their mailbox on the property had been vandalized. A dead female puppy and several menstrual pads were on the box, which also bore bullet holes. The Hensons reported the event to the county sheriff's department, which filed a report. On November 10, the couple received the first of what would be many harassing phone calls. Other phone calls the couple received included someone threatening to bomb the property and another person warning them that the Ku Klux Klan would perform a cross burning there. However, these calls largely ceased after the couple appeared on a local television show the day after Thanksgiving and said that all phone calls made to them were being traced. However, the couple stated that they were still the target of other forms of harassment. This included having a note reading "LEAVE QUEERS NOW" left on their front porch and having a bus of schoolchildren yell "Hey, faggots" at them, with the bus driver cueing the students with his horn. Additionally, the couple reported seeing several men, including some who were armed, on their property. By December, Sheriff Maurice Hook said that he had increased patrols in the area, but had found nothing worthy of investigation.

On December 21, 1993, the Hensons appeared on an episode of The Oprah Winfrey Show to discuss their situation with Oprah Winfrey. In addition to the Hensons, several critics, including The Reverend Allen, also appeared on the show. During the interview, Brenda described several instances of harassment she had experienced in Ovett, including an instance when she had been followed home by a driver who had attempted to run her off the road and a time when a local gravel provider was threatened with property destruction if he worked with the Hensons. That month, the couple would be interviewed by several other media programs, including 20/20, the BBC, Jerry Springer, and Larry King Live. By January 1994, the property was protected by guards and a locked gate. Additionally, the Hensons purchased a shotgun and a .30-30 Winchester rifle for self-defense. By the following month, the number of people who lived on the property was between 8 and 12. That month, it was reported that a bomb had exploded outside of the Hensons' gate. By October 1994, journalist Bettina Boxall of the Los Angeles Times reported that the Hensons had experienced 64 incidents of harassment since moving to Ovett.

=== Organized efforts to remove the camp ===
On November 28, 1993, Ovett resident James Hendry wrote an article in the Hattiesburg American suggesting that the community should pool their resources and attempt to buy the Hensons' property. On December 6, about 250 Ovett area residents gathered for a meeting at the Ovett Community Center to discuss the camp. The Hensons, who did not attend due to concerns for their own safety, had previously written a letter to the meeting organizers requesting that it be canceled, though they received no response. At the meeting, several community members expressed outrage over the camp, with one person saying he feared that the lesbians at the camp would cause his unborn niece to become lesbian. In their coverage of the meeting, the Hattiesburg American quoted one resident, Clint Knight, as saying, "These people can pick up our little girls and take them to this place and do whatever they want to". Opponents to the camp called themselves the "Ovett Citizens Group", though they later changed their name to "Mississippi for Family Values".

At the meeting, the residents elected Paul Walley, an attorney from Richton, and Hendry to form a group that would find ways to force the Hensons to move. According to Walley, the residents of Ovett were largely Christians who were vehemently opposed to homosexuality and believed that Sister Spirit were aiming to recruit some women in the community into becoming lesbians. John Ellzy, a member of the Mississippi House of Representatives, volunteered to research building codes and laws on cohabitation and sodomy to see if there was a legal avenue to remove the camp. Among other ways of removing the group, Walley proposed several options, including having the Jones County Board of Supervisors pass an ordinance against them or labeling them as a public nuisance, though he stated that the odds of these options succeeding were slim. A representative of the Mississippi branch of the National Gay and Lesbian Task Force (NGLTF)), Gary Barlow, attended the meeting, but did not speak out of fear for his safety. Speaking later of the event, Barlow said, "I've never felt such intense hatred in my life. ... It's really hard to describe."

Another meeting of local residents was held on January 3, 1994, at the Jones County Courthouse in nearby Ellisville, Mississippi. At the meeting, which was attended by about 400 people, attendees donated $852 ($1,851 in 2025) towards a legal campaign to stop the camp. Additionally, Walley said that he was still researching law in order to see if there was a way to legally force the Hensons to leave. Walley also expressed hope that the Supreme Court of the United States could issue a ruling that would allow communities to bar homosexual activities in the same way that they could ban the consumption of alcohol or pornography. The meeting was attended by a representative of the NGLTF, who said that the group was trying to collect information that would convince the federal government to intervene in the matter. After the meeting, attendees harassed two men that the crowd thought were gay men, prompting the police to escort the men to safety.

=== Involvement of the Department of Justice ===
In mid-December 1993, the NGLTF requested that United States Attorney General Janet Reno intervene in the situation via the United States Department of Justice's Community Relations Service. On January 12, 1994, the NGLTF held a meeting with several officials from the Department of Justice. However, a spokesperson for the service stated that they were legally unable to intervene. Per the NGLTF, it was difficult to engage the federal government in the matter because sexual orientation at the time was not protected by federal civil rights legislation. However, on January 20, Reno ordered the Federal Bureau of Investigation to investigate a bomb threat made against the Hensons. By February, the NGLTF said that it had received assurances from the Department of Justice that the situation in Ovett was being monitored. Additionally, the Department of Justice advised the Hensons to not travel alone, as they may be targeted for violence.

On February 17, Reno ordered federal mediators to Ovett. In a latter sent to the NGLTF on February 19, Reno said that the decision had been made because of a threatening letter that the Hensons had received via the United States Postal Service, which was against federal law. Susan Brown and Ozell Sutton of the Community Relations Service were dispatched to Ovett, where they spoke with local officials and Sheriff Hooks regarding the situation. Multiple news sources said that this marked the first time that that mediators from the Department of Justice had taken up a case regarding the harassment of LGBTQ people. While federal officials doubted that any civil rights charges would be filed, they did suspect that some individuals could be charged with other federal offenses regarding the illegal use of explosives or threats made via the mail or phone.

The mediators attempted to hold a mediation session between the camp and its opponents but were unable to do so because the camp's opponents refused to participate. Hendry, in discussing the opposition's decision, said that they did not want to set a precedent regarding federal mediation in LGBTQ issues and that they were skeptical of the impartiality of the mediators. Speaking later of the mediators' efforts, a volunteer for the camp said that nothing came from it. The decision to dispatch the Community Relations Service was criticized by Walley, and the following month, Representative Parker publicly requested that Reno apologize to the people of Ovett, as he took offense to her accusations that the residents had engaged in "intolerance and bigotry".

=== United States congressional hearing ===
On July 6, 1994, a United States congressional hearing was held in Jackson, Mississippi, organized by the United States House Committee on the Judiciary's Subcommittee on Civil and Constitutional Rights. The hearing was overseen by Representatives Barney Frank and Jerry Nadler and sought to address whether or not local law enforcement in Ovett had responded in a proper manner to the Hensons' complaints of harassment. The representatives took testimony from Sutton, the Hensons, and opponents of the camp, including Allen and Hendry.

== Legal proceedings ==
In February 1994, The Advocate reported that David Daniels, a lawyer based in Biloxi, Mississippi, had volunteered to provide legal aid to the Hensons, working in conjunction with the San Francisco-based National Center for Lesbian Rights. Daniels stated that he would be working with the Hensons to legally prosecute members of the community who had harassed them. By this time, the couple had already filed charges against one man who had threatened to burn down the camp, who they had identified via a caller ID system that they had installed on their phone. In a February 1994 article in The New York Times, journalist Peter Applebome said that the Hensons were looking into applying a 118-year-old anti-Ku Klux Klan law in order to label their opponents an "illegal conspiracy".

=== Lawsuit against Janet Reno ===
On March 5, 1994, Mississippi for Family Values filed a lawsuit against Reno. In the suit, the group stated that Reno's actions were unconstitutional and in violation of the Ninth Amendment and Tenth Amendment to the Constitution of the United States, which limited the power of the federal government. Additionally, the group claimed that some of the statements made by Reno regarding "the intolerance and bigotry demonstrated by some of the people of Ovett" were "contradictory of a genuine desire to mediate". On May 19, Judge Charles W. Pickering of the United States District Court for the Southern District of Mississippi heard the case, ultimately dismissing it.

=== Nuisance lawsuit against the camp ===
By October 1994, a group of eleven neighbors had filed a lawsuit against the camp, claiming that the retreat would constitute a nuisance. In response, Daniels countersued for fees and damages, also bringing charges against the Jones County sheriff and Mississippi for Family Values via a century-old anti-Ku Klux Klan law concerning conspiracy to harass, intimidate, or threaten people for using their land in a Constitutionally protected way. According to journalist Jeff B. Harmon of the New Statesman, the local community fundraised between $15,000 and $20,000 ($33,000 and $43,000 in 2025) in support of the case. Testimony began on May 19, 1995. By that time, six neighbors had dropped their charges, leaving five plaintiffs in the case. On July 6, 1995, Judge Frank McKenzie of the Mississippi Chancery Courts found that the camp did not constitute a nuisance. However, the judge denied the Hensons' request for attorney's fees and sanctions. By late 1995, the countersuit had not moved forward, as the Hensons were waiting to see if the plaintiffs would appeal the case before the Supreme Court of Mississippi.

== Later history ==
Harassing incidents against the Hensons continued for several years, as in February 1996, a car was set on fire and pushed down the camp's driveway, causing fire damage to some of the property. However, the camp continued to operate in Ovett, and by August 1998, the camp's food pantry was providing food to about 200 locals monthly. Additionally, the camp by this time had received over 4,000 visitors from 11 countries over the preceding five years.

In 2003, Brenda reported that affairs between the camp and local community had improved drastically. By this time, in addition to providing food for over 100 people monthly, the camp also regularly held educational programs and music festivals and had networked with other charity organizations in the area. Additionally, church groups rented space at the camp, and the facility hosted Unitarian Universalism services. At the time, the camp operated with about 40 volunteers and had hosted 5,000 visitors from 12 countries.

In 2003, Brenda said that she was suffering from post-traumatic stress disorder and colon cancer, which she attributed to the trauma that she had experienced upon establishing the camp. According to the Mississippi Free Press, following her cancer diagnosis, camp activities declined. In 2008, Brenda died. Following this, Andrea Gibbs-Henson, her daughter, took over as the camp's executive director. However, by 2021, the camp had closed. That year, it received local media attention due to a murder that took place on the former grounds. In 2025, Wanda died.

== See also ==
- LGBTQ rights in Mississippi
- Rural LGBTQ people
- Womyn's land

== Sources ==
- "Mad in Mississippi". The Advocate (653). Los Angeles: Liberation Publications: 18. April 19, 1994. ISSN 0001-8996. OCLC 60638931.
- "Capital Offensive". The Advocate (727). Liberation Publications. February 18, 1997. ISSN 0001-8996. OCLC 60638931.
- Applebome, Peter (February 21, 1994). "Mediators Taking Role in Dispute on Lesbians". The New York Times. p. 10. ISSN 0362-4331. OCLC 1645522. Archived from the original on April 18, 2020.
- "Reno Sends Mediators into Anti-Gay Case". Los Angeles Times. Associated Press. February 19, 1994. ISSN 0458-3035. OCLC 3638237. Archived from the original on October 29, 2025.
- Berlo, Beth (March 6, 2003). "Camp Sister Spirit soldiers on in peace". Bay Windows. 21 (12). OCLC 61124500.
- Booth, William (December 11, 1993). "For Lesbian Couple, Mississippi Retreat is Hardly a Haven". The Washington Post. ISSN 0190-8286. OCLC 2269358. Archived from the original on December 10, 2021.
- Boulard, Garry (December 27, 1994). "Yankees, go home". The Advocate (671). Los Angeles: Liberation Publications: 28–31. ISSN 0001-8996. OCLC 60638931.
- Boxall, Bettina (October 23, 1994). "Lesbian Couple Pursue Dream Despite Danger". Los Angeles Times. ISSN 0458-3035. OCLC 3638237. Archived from the original on October 29, 2025.
- "Baptists, Lesbian Campers Clash". Christianity Today. 38 (2): 44. February 7, 1994. ISSN 0009-5753. OCLC 1554505. Archived from the original on November 7, 2024.
- Dawidoff, Robert (February 25, 1994). "The Feds, Civil Rights and Camp Sister Spirit". Los Angeles Times. ISSN 0458-3035. OCLC 3638237. Archived from the original on April 18, 2020.
- Enszer, Julie R. (June 12, 2025). "Opinion | A Life Well-Lived: Remembering Wanda Henson". Mississippi Free Press. Archived from the original on June 13, 2025.
- Greene, Kate (2003). "Fear and Loathing in Mississippi: The Attack on Camp Sister Spirit". Journal of Lesbian Studies. 7 (2). Harrington Park Press: 85–106. doi:10.1300/J155v07n02_07. ISSN 1089-4160. PMID 24815896.
- Harmon, Jeff B. (August 28, 1998). "The Sisters Take on the Rednecks". New Statesman. 127 (4400). ISSN 1364-7431. OCLC 4588945.
- Kershaw, Sarah (January 30, 2009). "My Sister's Keeper". The New York Times. ISSN 1553-8095. OCLC 1645522. Archived from the original on June 16, 2025.
- Labaton, Stephen (February 19, 1994). "Reno Orders U.S. Mediation in Lesbian Harassment Case". The New York Times. p. 1. ISSN 0362-4331. OCLC 1645522. Archived from the original on June 19, 2020.
- Levine, Bertram; Lum, Grande (2020). America's Peacemakers: The Community Relations Service and Civil Rights (New ed.). Columbia, Missouri: University of Missouri Press. ISBN 978-0-8262-7451-9. LCCN 2020019504. OCLC 1154094896.
- Lynch, Thomas P. (Winter 1995). "Camp Sister Spirit: A Retreat Under Siege". Mediation Quarterly. 13 (2). Jossey-Bass: 151–163. doi:10.1002/crq.3900130208. ISSN 0739-4098.
- McPherson, Tara (2003). "Steel Magnolias, Fatal Flowers, and Designing Women: On the Limits of a Politics of Femininity in the Sun Belt South". Reconstructing Dixie: Race, Gender, and Nostalgia in the Imagined South. Durham, North Carolina: Duke University Press. pp. 149–204. ISBN 978-0-8223-8462-5. OCLC 645449977.
- "Arrest in Slayings of 2 Gay Men". The New York Times. October 14, 1994. p. 26. ISSN 0362-4331. OCLC 1645522. Archived from the original on May 26, 2015.
- "20 years ago Massachusetts became the first state to allow same-sex marriage". Morning Edition. NPR. May 17, 2024. Archived from the original on September 20, 2025.
- Ricks, Ingrid (February 8, 1994). "Mississippi Showdown". The Advocate (648). Additional reporting from Francesca Porter. Los Angeles: Liberation Publications: 36–39. ISSN 0001-8996. OCLC 60638931.
- Royte, Elizabeth (January 1995). "Town Without Pity". Elle. 10 (5). ISSN 0888-0808. OCLC 697050973.
- Sparks, Randy J. (2001). Religion in Mississippi. Heritage of Mississippi Series. Mississippi Historical Society. Jackson, Mississippi: University Press of Mississippi. ISBN 978-1-61703-580-7. OCLC 45195627.
- "Lesbians face hostility in Miss. town". Tampa Bay Times. October 6, 2005 [January 9, 1994]. ISSN 2641-4643. OCLC 5920090. Archived from the original on October 2, 2022.
- Thomas, Danielle (September 23, 2003) [September 22, 2003]. "Camp Sister Spirit Gives Sanctuary to Many". WLOX. Archived from the original on October 30, 2025.
- Thornton, Mark (February 19, 2021). "'Throuple' Murder". Laurel Leader-Call. Archived from the original on March 3, 2021.
- Thornton, Mark (August 5, 2022) [July 29, 2022]. "'Closure' in killing at Camp Sister Spirit". Laurel Leader-Call. Archived from the original on October 30, 2025.
- Turque, Bill (March 13, 2010) [December 19, 1993]. "Mississippi Burning". Newsweek. ISSN 0028-9604. OCLC 818916146. Archived from the original on February 15, 2018.
- Wilson, Charles Reagan (2011). Flashes of a Southern Spirit: Meanings of the Spirit in the U.S. South. Athens, Georgia: University of Georgia Press. ISBN 978-0-8203-3956-6. LCCN 2010043511. OCLC 759158820.
- "Controversial Camp Sister Spirit Celebrates 10 Years". WLOX. September 22, 2003. Archived from the original on August 7, 2014.
