= Same-sex marriage in Mississippi =

Same-sex marriage has been legal in Mississippi since June 26, 2015. On November 25, 2014, Judge Carlton Reeves of the U.S. District Court for the Southern District of Mississippi ruled that the state's ban on same-sex marriage was unconstitutional in Campaign for Southern Equality v. Bryant. Enforcement of his ruling was stayed pending appeal to the Fifth Circuit Court of Appeals. On June 26, 2015, the U.S. Supreme Court ruled in Obergefell v. Hodges that the denial of marriage rights to same-sex couples violates the U.S. Constitution. On June 29, Attorney General Jim Hood ordered clerks to comply with the court ruling and issue marriage licenses to same-sex couples. The Fifth Circuit lifted its stay on July 1, and Judge Reeves ordered an end to Mississippi's enforcement of its same-sex marriage ban. However, until July 2, several counties continued to refuse to issue marriage licenses, including DeSoto, Jasper, Jones, Newton, Pontotoc, Simpson and Yalobusha.

Mississippi had previously denied marriage rights to same-sex couples by statute since 1997 and in its State Constitution since 2004. Polling suggests that a narrow majority of Mississippi residents support the legal recognition of same-sex marriage, with a 2024 Public Religion Research Institute poll showing that 54% of respondents supported same-sex marriage.

== Legal restrictions ==
=== Statutes ===
In 1978, a same-sex couple was refused a marriage license. In 1994, another same-sex couple, Todd Emerson and Luis Cintron, applied for a license in Ocean Springs but were rejected. Consequently, Governor Kirk Fordice issued an executive order banning same-sex marriage in the state on August 24, 1996. On January 10, 1997, the Mississippi State Senate passed a bill banning same-sex marriage. The House of Representatives passed the bill on February 5, 1997, and Governor Fordice signed it into law on February 12. It went into effect that same day.

=== Constitutional amendment ===
On March 1, 2004, the House of Representatives, by a 97 to 17 vote, approved Amendment 1, a constitutional amendment defining marriage as "only between a man and a woman" and denying recognition to same-sex marriages from other jurisdictions. The Mississippi Senate passed it on April 7 by a 51 to 0 vote, and voters approved it on November 4 with 86% of the vote.

== Lawsuits ==
=== Czekala-Chatham v. Melancon ===
A lesbian couple, Lauren Beth Czekala-Chatham and Dana Ann Melancon, residents of Mississippi who had married in California in 2008, asked the state to recognize their marriage in order to allow them to divorce. The lawsuit was filed in DeSoto County, in Mississippi's Third District Chancery Court, in September 2013. The Mississippi Attorney General's office intervened in their divorce suit, Czekala-Chatham v. Melancon. The plaintiffs contended that "there can be no legitimate state purpose in allowing bigamous or incestuous couples to divorce and not allowing the same remedy to same-sex couples". The Third District Chancery Court dismissed their case for lack of jurisdiction. On appeal, the Mississippi Supreme Court took jurisdiction and allowed Governor Phil Bryant, represented by the Alliance Defending Freedom, to intervene to support the state's position. That court heard oral arguments on January 21, 2015. On February 24, the court, after noting that all parties agreed proceedings should be stayed pending action by the U.S. Supreme Court in related cases, asked for additional briefs. Six justices supported that request, one objected that nothing would be gained, and two objected that it was only "a delay tactic" and the court should find the state's ban on same-sex marriage unconstitutional.

On July 2, 2015, Attorney General Jim Hood, citing the previous week's decision by the U.S. Supreme Court in Obergefell, asked the court to grant the divorce he had previously opposed. On November 5, 2015, in a 5–4 ruling, the Mississippi Supreme Court remanded the case to the Third District Chancery Court in light of Obergefell. The court ruled that the plaintiffs' requested relief, which the Attorney General had already agreed, was consistent with Obergefell and thus ruled in favor of Czekala-Chatham. Forming the five-justice majority were Justices Bill Waller Jr., Michael Randolph, Ann Hannaford Lamar, David Chandler, and Randy Pierce. Justices Josiah Coleman and Jess Dickinson each joined each other's dissents, disagreeing with Obergefell and questioning the decision's constitutional authority. Justice Pierce, joined by Chandler, wrote a separate concurrence accusing Justices Coleman and Dickinson of violating their oath of office by refusing to follow a ruling of the U.S. Supreme Court. Justice Leslie King, joined by James Kitchens, dissented, though they agreed Czekala-Chatham received the proper relief. Justice King wrote that, "While I am satisfied that the right result for Czekala-Chatham has been reached, I believe this Court does a great disservice to the jurisprudence of this State by reaching such result in an order, rather than issuing a precedential opinion. Consequently, I object to issuing this decision via order."

On December 1, 2015, Chancellor Mitchell Lundy, Jr. granted the divorce. He apologized to Czekala-Chatham for denying the original divorce in December 2013, but explained that he felt he had no other choice due to Mississippi's refusal to recognize their marriage at the time.

=== Campaign for Southern Equality v. Bryant ===
Same-sex marriage in the United States

The Campaign for Southern Equality and two lesbian couples filed suit, in Campaign for Southern Equality v. Bryant, in the U.S. District Court for the Southern District of Mississippi on October 20, 2014, challenging Mississippi's statutory and constitutional denial of marriage rights to same-sex couples. Each of the couples was raising two children and one couple had previously married in Maine. Their principal attorney was Roberta Kaplan, who had argued United States v. Windsor before the U.S. Supreme Court. They named as defendants Governor Bryant and Attorney General Hood, and the Hinds County circuit clerk who denied a marriage license to one of the plaintiff couples. U.S. District Court Judge Carlton Reeves held a hearing on motions for summary judgment on November 12. He ruled for the plaintiffs on November 25, finding that the state's ban did not survive rational basis review. Although Fifth Circuit precedent prevented him from using a stricter standard when considering discrimination on the basis of sexual orientation, he argued at length that the proper standard to use would be "heightened scrutiny" and he suggested the Fifth Circuit consider revisiting the question. He stayed his ruling for 14 days to allow the defendants to request a longer stay from the Fifth Circuit Court of Appeals or the U.S. Supreme Court. Reeves ruled:

Gay and lesbian persons are full citizens that share the same rights as other citizens, including the right to marry. This conclusion does not conflict with Glucksberg. The right to marry is rooted in history and tradition, but history shows that tradition does not dictate who gets to exercise certain rights. (Any doubt could be resolved by asking Mildred and Richard Loving, Estelle Griswold, William Baird, John Lawrence and Tyron Garner, and Edith Windsor and Thea Spyer.) The State's narrow interpretation of this right diminishes the importance it has continuously been given by the Supreme Court, contrary to applicable case law. It also serves to undermine the dignity of gay and lesbian citizens by suggesting that they are unworthy of sharing rights fundamental to every free person. [...] The Supreme Court has made it "abundantly clear" that "the fact that the governing majority in a State has traditionally viewed a particular practice as immoral is not a sufficient reason for upholding a law prohibiting the practice." Tradition was the basis for defending Texas's sodomy law; part of it too was rendered unenforceable. It would be a mistake to conclude that courts abolish time-honored traditions. Rather, courts resolve conflicts between "two conflicting traditions: the egalitarian one to which most official documents have paid lip service over the past century, and the quite different and malevolent one that in fact has characterized much official and unofficial practice over the same period (and certainly before)." In Loving, Lawrence, and Windsor, the restrictions popular in those times yielded to our egalitarian traditions of marriage, privacy, and dignity. Today's case is no different. "Tradition" will not suffice to uphold Mississippi's marriage ban.

The state defendants asked the Fifth Circuit for a stay pending appeal the next day. This stay was immediately opposed by the plaintiffs, who also filed a motion to expedite the appeal to coincide with hearings for a Texas case, De Leon v. Perry, and a Louisiana case, Robicheaux v. George. On December 4, the Fifth Circuit agreed to expedite the case, but not to consolidate oral arguments with its other same-sex marriage cases. It issued a stay pending appeal the same day. The Fifth Circuit heard oral arguments on January 9, 2015, before Judges Patrick Higginbotham, Jerry Edwin Smith, and James Graves Jr.

On June 26, 2015, the U.S. Supreme Court ruled in Obergefell v. Hodges that the denial of marriage rights to same-sex couples violates the Due Process and Equal Protection clauses of the Fourteenth Amendment. Following the decision, Attorney General Hood said: "The Supreme Court's decision is not immediately effective in Mississippi. It will become effective in Mississippi, and circuit clerks will be required to issue same-sex marriage licenses, when the 5th Circuit lifts the stay", allowing Judge Reeves' order to take effect. Governor Bryant and Lieutenant Governor Tate Reeves condemned the ruling. State Representative Andy Gipson, chair of the Mississippi House Judiciary Committee, suggested the state should consider having "no marriage certificate sponsored by the state". The first same-sex couple to marry in Mississippi were Amber Hamilton and Annice Smith in Hattiesburg on June 26, just hours before Attorney General Hood instructed county clerks to wait for the Fifth Circuit to lift its stay. The plaintiffs filed a motion the same day asking the Fifth Circuit to lift its stay. Attorney General Hood did not oppose that motion, but Governor Bryant did. On June 29, Hood issued an email to county clerks to clarify his earlier statement which, he wrote, "seems to have been misinterpreted as prohibiting Circuit Clerks from issuing marriage licenses to same-sex couples. The statement was merely meant to explain that an order of the Fifth Circuit would be necessary to lift the stay." He wrote: "Obergefell is the law of the land. If a clerk has issued or decides to issue a marriage license to a same-sex couple, there will be no adverse action taken by the Attorney General against that circuit clerk on behalf of the State.... On the other hand, a clerk who refuses to issue a marriage license to a same-sex couple could be sued by the denied couple and may face liability." On July 1, the Fifth Circuit lifted its stay and returned the Campaign for Southern Equality case to the district court, where Judge Reeves ordered Mississippi and its agents to cease enforcing the state's constitutional and statutory restrictions on same-sex marriage. The last counties in Mississippi to refuse to issue marriage licenses, DeSoto, Jasper, Jones, Newton, Pontotoc, Simpson and Yalobusha counties, began issuing licenses on July 2, 2015.

== Developments after legalization ==
On June 27, 2016, a federal judge ruled that county clerks in Mississippi may not use their religious beliefs to deny marriage licenses to same-sex couples. U.S. District Judge Carlton Reeves ruled that the recusals on religious grounds granted by the Religious Liberty Accommodations Act violated the Supreme Court's ruling in Obergefell. The decision was overturned on appeal by the Fifth Circuit on June 23, 2017, in Barber v. Bryant, on the grounds that the plaintiffs in this case lacked standing.

In April 2018, the Mississippi Supreme Court ruled in Strickland v. Day that married same-sex couples must be granted the same parental rights as married opposite-sex couples. The court overturned a lower court's decision that denied legal parentage to Strickland, a non-biological lesbian mother who had raised a child with her ex-wife. The Supreme Court ordered that Strickland be listed as a parent on the child's birth certificate and remanded the case to the trial court to determine matters of child support and custody.

== Native American nations ==
The Indian Civil Rights Act primarily aims to protect the rights of Native Americans but also reinforces the principle of tribal self-governance. While it does not grant sovereignty, the Act affirms the authority of tribes to govern their own legal affairs. Consequently, many tribes have enacted their own marriage and family laws. As a result, the Supreme Court's Obergefell ruling did not automatically apply to tribal jurisdictions. Mississippi has only one federally recognized Native American tribe, the Mississippi Band of Choctaw Indians. Its Domestic Relations Code (Choctaw: Chukka Achʋffa Anumpa Ʋlhpisa) recognizes all marriages which have been validly performed in other jurisdictions. The code defines marriage as "a personal consensual relationship arising out of a civil contract to which the consent of parties capable of making it is necessary", and does not expressly forbid same-sex marriages. On May 4, 2016, the Assistant Attorney General, Cheryl Hamby, stated in an official opinion that due to its recognition of Mississippi state law as a "valid means for marriage, same sex marriage is valid in tribal court. Additionally, the tribe will recognize a Mississippi same-sex marriage licence."

Native Americans have deep-rooted marriage traditions, placing a strong emphasis on community, family and spiritual connections. Traditional Choctaw marriages (ittihalʋlli) involve a symbolic blanket ceremony to signify the spouses joining as one family, traditional clothing, following by feasting and dancing. Marriages were exogamous, matrilineal, matriarchal and mostly monogamous, though chiefs (mi̱ko) occasionally practiced polygyny. While there are no records of same-sex marriages being performed in Native American cultures in the way they are commonly defined in Western legal systems, many Indigenous communities recognize identities and relationships that may be placed on the LGBT spectrum. Among these are two-spirit individuals—people who embody both masculine and feminine qualities. In some cultures, two-spirit individuals assigned male at birth wear women's clothing and engage in household and artistic work associated with the feminine sphere. Historically, this identity sometimes allowed for unions between two people of the same biological sex. In the Choctaw language, two-spirit people are known as ohoyo holba (pronounced [ohoːjó hólba]), though the term is relatively modern. It is unknown if Choctaw two-spirit individuals were historically allowed to marry, as a lot of traditional knowledge was lost in the aftermath of colonization and the Trail of Tears for those Choctaw forcibly removed to the Indian Territory. Choctaw author LeAnne Howe stated in a 2022 book, "Often they weren't just involved with other men but had many levels of relationships. They were also involved with our community in very special ways. They could be healers. They're people that protected our children because they embodied more than one thing. And what is part of Choctawan aesthetics is that we revere things that are unusual. Different. When you look at the spirit that's connected in [ohoyo holba], and when they put on that dress in olden times, they are saying 'the embodiment of many'." Some female-bodied two-spirit individuals use the term hattak holba (pronounced [hat.ták hólba]).

== Demographics and marriage statistics ==
Data from the 2000 U.S. census showed that 4,774 same-sex couples were living in Mississippi. Same-sex couples lived in all counties of the state, and constituted 0.8% of coupled households and 0.5% of all households in the state. Most couples lived in Hinds, Harrison and Rankin counties, but the counties with the highest percentage of same-sex couples were Tallahatchie (0.82% of all county households) and Marshall (0.74%). Same-sex partners in Mississippi were on average younger than opposite-sex partners, and more likely to be employed. However, the average and median household incomes of same-sex couples were lower than different-sex couples, and same-sex couples were also far less likely to own a home than opposite-sex partners. Individuals in same-sex relationships were also significantly more likely to be African American; 46% of people in same-sex unions were African American compared to 20.5% of people in married opposite-sex unions. 35% of same-sex couples in Mississippi were raising children under the age of 18, with an estimated 2,839 children living in households headed by same-sex couples in 2005.

The 2020 U.S. census showed that there were 3,100 married same-sex couple households (1,173 male couples and 1,927 female couples) and 2,837 unmarried same-sex couple households in Mississippi.

== Domestic partnerships ==
On September 5, 2014, the City Council of Starkville voted 7–0 in favor of establishing domestic partner benefits for city employees in same-sex relationships. However, the Council voted 5–2 to repeal the ordinance on January 6, 2015. On January 8, Mayor Parker Wiseman vetoed the repeal, but the Council voted 5–2 to override Wiseman's veto on January 21, and repeal the domestic partnership ordinance.

== Public opinion ==
Public opinion for same-sex marriage in Mississippi
Poll source	Dates administered	Sample size	Margin of error	Support	Opposition	Do not know / refused
Public Religion Research Institute	February 28 – December 8, 2025	351 adults	?	47%	49%	4%
Public Religion Research Institute	March 13 – December 2, 2024	206 adults	?	54%	42%	4%
Public Religion Research Institute	March 9 – December 7, 2023	167 adults	?	50%	46%	4%
Public Religion Research Institute	March 11 – December 14, 2022	?	?	49%	48%	3%
Public Religion Research Institute	March 8 – November 9, 2021	?	?	44%	55%	1%
Public Religion Research Institute	January 7 – December 20, 2020	286 adults	?	47%	33%	20%
Public Religion Research Institute	April 5 – December 23, 2017	586 adults	?	42%	48%	10%
Public Religion Research Institute	May 18, 2016 – January 10, 2017	833 adults	?	37%	56%	7%
Public Religion Research Institute	April 29, 2015 – January 7, 2016	753 adults	?	25%	65%	10%
Public Religion Research Institute	April 2, 2014 – January 4, 2015	536 adults	?	32%	61%	7%
New York Times/CBS News/YouGov	September 20 – October 1, 2014	826 likely voters	± 4.5%	29%	56%	15%
Public Policy Polling	November 15–17, 2013	502 voters	± 4.4%	22%	69%	9%
Greenberg Quinlan Rosner Research/Target Point Consulting	June 26 – July 9, 2013	640 adults	± 3.9%	36%	55%	9%
Public Policy Polling	November 4–6, 2011	796 likely voters	± 3.5%	13%	78%	9%

In the 2016 Public Religion Research Institute (PRRI) poll, Mississippi was one of the only three U.S. states where a majority of residents opposed same-sex marriage, alongside Arkansas and West Virginia. In 2021, Mississippi was the state with the highest opposition to same-sex marriage in the country according to the PRRI.

== See also ==
- LGBT rights in Mississippi
- Same-sex marriage in the United States
