= 2004 Mississippi Amendment 1 =

Referendum to ban same-sex marriage

Amendment 1
- November 2, 2004
- Mississippi Marriage Definition Amendment

Results
Choice	Votes	%
Yes	957,104	86.01%
No	155,648	13.99%
Valid votes	1,112,752	96.56%
Invalid or blank votes	39,613	3.44%
Total votes	1,152,365	100.00%
Registered voters/turnout	2,068,766	53.78%
- County results Yes 90–100% 80–90% 70–80%

2004 Mississippi Amendment 1 was a proposed amendment to the Constitution of Mississippi to define marriage as between one man and one woman, thereby prohibiting same-sex marriages from being recognized in the state. The amendment passed by referendum on November 2, 2004, with ~86% of voters in favor.

Out of all similar same-sex marriage ban amendments passed in the United States, Mississippi's amendment received the highest percentage of votes cast in favor of a ban.

== Contents and amendment ==
=== Contents ===
The amendment, which was decided by voters on November 2, 2004, alongside the 2004 U.S. presidential election, had the following information shown to voters for it:

Constitutional Amendment

Amendment No. 1

House Concurrent Resolution 56

The proposed constitutional amendment provides that marriage may take place and may be valid under the law of this state only between a man and a woman. The amendment also provides that a marriage in another state or foreign jurisdiction between persons of the same gender may not be recognized in this state and is void and unenforceable under the laws of this state.

[] Yes

[] No

=== Amendment ===
The text of the adopted amendment, which is Article XIV, Section 263A of the Mississippi Constitution, states:

Marriage may take place and may be valid under the laws of this State only between a man and a woman. A marriage in another State or foreign jurisdiction between persons of the same gender, regardless of when the marriage took place, may not be recognized in this state and is void and unenforceable under the laws of this State.

== Results ==
86.01% voted in favor, and 13.99% voted against. The highest percentage of votes cast in favor of the amendment came from Itawamba County, with 94.06% in favor, and the lowest level came from Tunica County, with 73.43% in favor.

The following table details the results by county:

Results by county
County	Yes		No	
County	#	%	#	%
Adams	11,351	83.29	2,278	16.71
Alcorn	9,793	93.04	733	6.96
Amite	6,305	89.71	723	10.29
Attala	7,576	90.27	817	9.73
Benton	3,421	85.70	571	14.30
Bolivar	7,489	86.91	1,128	13.09
Calhoun	5,944	91.54	549	8.46
Carroll	4,792	88.17	643	11.83
Chickasaw	7,336	88.92	914	11.08
Choctaw	3,695	90.74	377	9.26
Claiborne	3,758	76.37	1,163	23.63
Clarke	7,144	91.86	633	8.14
Clay	8,727	87.47	1,250	12.53
Coahoma	4,742	85.80	785	14.20
Copiah	10,776	87.70	1,512	12.30
Covington	7,278	88.90	909	11.10
DeSoto	42,379	87.33	6,148	12.67
Forrest	21,815	82.64	4,582	17.36
Franklin	3,849	88.58	496	11.42
George	7,441	91.19	719	8.81
Greene	4,921	92.85	379	7.15
Grenada	8,313	88.57	1,073	11.43
Hancock	13,058	77.60	3,770	22.40
Harrison	47,367	76.49	14,556	23.51
Hinds	71,798	78.59	19,561	21.41
Holmes	6,521	84.31	1,214	15.69
Humphreys	3,586	81.30	825	18.70
Issaquena	685	81.16	159	18.84
Itawamba	9,122	94.06	576	5.94
Jackson	39,960	80.52	9,667	19.48
Jasper	6,969	87.37	1,007	12.63
Jefferson	2,993	79.16	788	20.84
Jefferson Davis	5,505	87.59	780	12.41
Jones	24,540	92.00	2,133	8.00
Kemper	4,122	87.55	586	12.45
Lafayette	11,773	77.76	3,368	22.24
Lamar	18,291	89.88	2,060	10.12
Lauderdale	25,943	88.63	3,327	11.37
Lawrence	6,010	91.03	592	8.97
Leake	7,376	89.59	857	10.41
Lee	26,923	90.17	2,934	9.83
Leflore	6,541	86.44	1,026	13.56
Lincoln	13,386	90.97	1,328	9.03
Lowndes	20,361	87.68	2,862	12.32
Madison	32,152	84.81	5,759	15.19
Marion	10,912	92.26	916	7.74
Marshall	11,353	84.59	2,068	15.41
Monroe	14,604	91.39	1,375	8.61
Montgomery	4,833	90.62	500	9.38
Neshoba	9,766	92.60	780	7.40
Newton	7,399	90.72	757	9.28
Noxubee	4,611	84.16	868	15.84
Oktibbeha	13,603	81.73	3,040	18.27
Panola	11,774	87.85	1,628	12.15
Pearl River	17,015	88.62	2,186	11.38
Perry	4,729	90.65	488	9.35
Pike	14,416	87.31	2,095	12.69
Pontotoc	10,668	93.83	702	6.17
Prentiss	9,553	93.35	680	6.65
Quitman	2,798	74.97	934	25.03
Rankin	47,981	88.31	6,351	11.69
Scott	8,933	86.52	1,392	13.48
Sharkey	1,786	82.42	381	17.58
Simpson	10,101	89.27	1,214	10.73
Smith	7,150	92.62	570	7.38
Stone	5,137	85.75	854	14.25
Sunflower	7,526	83.76	1,459	16.24
Tallahatchie	5,150	85.08	903	14.92
Tate	9,879	89.02	1,219	10.98
Tippah	8,660	92.85	667	7.15
Tishomingo	7,721	91.31	735	8.69
Tunica	2,169	73.43	785	26.57
Union	10,094	93.14	743	6.86
Walthall	5,924	89.26	713	10.74
Warren	15,041	82.97	3,088	17.03
Washington	14,454	83.75	2,804	16.25
Wayne	8,338	90.81	844	9.19
Webster	4,713	91.14	458	8.86
Wilkinson	3,559	85.31	613	14.69
Winston	8,653	89.46	1,019	10.54
Yalobusha	5,235	87.75	731	12.25
Yazoo	7,039	87.88	971	12.12
Total	957,104	86.01	155,648	13.99

== See also ==
- LGBTQ rights in Mississippi
