= Mississippi Student Religious Liberties Act of 2013 =

2013 Mississippi law

The Mississippi Student Religious Liberties Act of 2013 is a 2013 act which protects the views of students in any educational institution from being reprimanded for their religious views. Under the bill, a school may not discipline a student for expressing anti-LGBT views either verbally or through written assignments.

== Legislative history ==
On February 7, 2013, Mississippi Senate passed, with 50 ayes, 1 nay, and 1 vacancy, Senate Bill 2633. March 6, 2013, the Mississippi House of Representatives passed, with a 109 ayes, 6 nays, and 6 absent or not voting, 1 present, and 2 vacancies, SB 2633. On March 14, 2013, Governor Phil Bryant signed the bill and it went into effect on July 1, 2013.

== See also ==
- LGBT rights in Mississippi
