= Ovett, Mississippi =

Unincorporated community in Mississippi, US

- Census-designated place
- Location within Mississippi Location within the United States
- Coordinates: 31°29′08″N 89°01′58″W
- Country: United States
- State: Mississippi
- County: Jones

Area
  - Total: 1.74 sq mi (4.51 km^{2})
  - Land: 1.73 sq mi (4.49 km^{2})
  - Water: 0.012 sq mi (0.03 km^{2})
- Elevation: 200 ft (61 m)

Population (2020)
  - Total: 183
  - Density: 105.6/sq mi (40.79/km^{2})
- Time zone: UTC-6 (Central (CST))
  - Summer (DST): UTC-5 (CDT)
- ZIP code: 39464
- Area code: 601
- FIPS code: 28-54680
- GNIS feature ID: 694284

Ovett is a census-designated place (CDP) and unincorporated community in southeastern Jones County, Mississippi. Ovett is part of the Laurel Micropolitan Statistical Area. As of the 2020 census, Ovett had a population of 183.

== History ==
It was first established as a sawmill town in the early 20th century. Ovett is located on the former Gulf, Mobile and Ohio Railroad and was once home to six general stores, a blacksmith, pharmacy, three lumber companies, and two grocery stores.

It was first named as a CDP in the 2020 Census which listed a population of 183.

Camp Sister Spirit, a feminist retreat, is located in Ovett.

== Geography ==
Ovett is located just west of the De Soto National Forest and Highway 15. The community has a post office with the ZIP code 39464.

== Demographics ==
Historical population
Census	Pop.	Note	%±
2020	183		—
U.S. Decennial Census; 2020

Ovett was first listed as a census designated place in the 2020 U.S. census.

=== 2020 census ===
Ovett CDP, Mississippi – Racial and ethnic composition Note: the US Census treats Hispanic/Latino as an ethnic category. This table excludes Latinos from the racial categories and assigns them to a separate category. Hispanics/Latinos may be of any race.
Race / Ethnicity (NH = Non-Hispanic)	Pop 2020	% 2020
White alone (NH)	180	98.36%
Black or African American alone (NH)	0	0.00%
Native American or Alaska Native alone (NH)	0	0.00%
Asian alone (NH)	0	0.00%
Pacific Islander alone (NH)	0	0.00%
Some Other Race alone (NH)	0	0.00%
Mixed Race or Multi-Racial (NH)	2	1.09%
Hispanic or Latino (any race)	1	0.55%
Total	183	100.00%

== Education ==
Residents are in the Jones County School District.

Jones County is in the zone of Jones College.
