= Queer anti-urbanism =

Viewpoints which question the assertion of LGBTQ identities as "urban"

Queer anti-urbanism is a concept in queer studies that critiques the assumption that queer identities and experiences are inherently linked to urban areas.

Scott Herring, who played a significant role in popularizing the term, describes queer anti-urbanism as "a means to critically negotiate the relentless urbanisms that often characterize any United States-based 'gay imaginary'... in which the city represents a beacon of tolerance and gay community, the country a locus of persecution and gay absence." In this context, queer anti-urbanism serves as a critique of homonormative and metronormative perspectives, which position urban living as the default or ideal setting for queer existence.

== Queer metronormativity ==
Jack Halberstam relates queer metronormativity to a dominant narrative of queer rural flight, describing it as "a spatial narrative within which the [queer] subject moves to a place of tolerance after enduring life in a place of suspicion, persecution, and secrecy". Halberstam critiques this narrative for implying that urban life is the only viable path to community, fulfillment, and open existence for LGBT individuals, potentially reinforcing stereotypes that devalue rural life.

Stereotypes about rural populations often portray them as unintelligent, unclean, and intolerant. These perceptions are reinforced in part by media coverage of widely publicized hate crimes, such as the assault and murder of Brandon Teena, which contribute to narratives depicting rural communities as violent and bigoted while portraying rural LGBTQ individuals primarily as victims. These stereotypes can lead to the assumption that LGBT individuals do not or cannot exist in rural areas. As a result, those who live in rural areas without conforming to these narratives may be overlooked within broader societal frameworks, including media, academic, and legal representations. For example, television programs may depict rural LGBT individuals as facing oppression while portraying their urban counterparts as thriving.

The metronormative narrative and the resulting invisibility of rural LGBT individuals can contribute to the perception that migration to urban areas is a necessary or expected step, as is adherence to the norms of urban LGBT culture. Scott Herring categorizes these norms into four areas: narratological, socioeconomic, aesthetic, and racial. According to Herring, integration into urban LGBTQ society often involves accepting the metronormative narrative, achieving financial means to participate in consumer culture, adhering to specific fashion and appearance standards, and conforming to whiteness. Failure to meet these expectations may reinforce existing stereotypes about rural communities and LGBTQ individuals within them. This dynamic can contribute to the continued marginalization of rural LGBTQ identities by pressuring individuals to downplay their rural backgrounds and conform to urban norms, further limiting visibility and representation.

Metronormativity is based on a perceived dichotomy between rural and urban experiences among LGBTQ individuals. It assumes that these two environments are fundamentally different while overlooking variations within urban and rural communities. This perspective often treats urban LGBTQ experiences as uniform across different cities and denies the existence of diverse LGBT experiences in rural areas, reinforcing the notion that rural LGBT life is either nonexistent or insignificant.

== Critical rusticity ==
Queer anti-urbanism takes various forms, a concept that Scott Herring refers to as "critical rusticity". One example is the establishment of rural lesbian separatist communities, which intentionally distanced themselves from urban areas and rejected the dominance of white, male-centric, upper-class gay culture. These communities challenged the prevailing narrative of rural flight among LGBTQ individuals and developed alternative value systems that incorporated both rural and queer identities.

Publications such as Rural Fairie Digest and Country Women countered the erasure of rural queer experiences by offering perspectives outside of mainstream gay consumer culture. These publications provided guidance on rural self-sufficiency and DIY skills while also fostering a sense of community among geographically isolated individuals.

Even without affiliating with broader movements, queer individuals living in rural settings challenge metronormativity by demonstrating that queer identities are not exclusively urban. This assertion of rural queer identity reframes differences between rural and urban LGBT experiences as value-neutral rather than hierarchical. More recently, scholars Julie A. Podmore and Alison L. Bain have critiqued the urban-rural binary in these discussions, highlighting how suburban queer experiences are often overlooked in this framework.

== See also ==
- Homonormativity
- LGBT and rurality
