= Mississippi Senate Bill 2753 =

2024 Mississippi law

Senate Bill 2753

Mississippi Legislature
- Long title: AN ACT TO CREATE NEW SECTION 29-18-1, MISSISSIPPI CODE OF 1972, TO CREATE THE "SAFER ACT" TO REGULATE GOVERNMENTAL BUILDINGS; TO CREATE NEW SECTION 29-18-3, MISSISSIPPI CODE OF 1972, TO PROVIDE LEGISLATIVE FINDINGS FOR THE ACT; TO CREATE NEW SECTION 29-18-5, MISSISSIPPI CODE OF 1972, TO PROVIDE DEFINITIONS FOR THE ACT; TO CREATE NEW SECTION 29-18-7, MISSISSIPPI CODE OF 1972, TO REQUIRE CERTAIN PUBLIC EDUCATION BUILDINGS TO HAVE EXCLUSIVE MALE AND/OR FEMALE RESTROOMS OR SINGLE-SEX OR FAMILY USE RESTROOMS AT A MINIMUM; TO CREATE NEW SECTION 29-18-9, MISSISSIPPI CODE OF 1972, TO REQUIRE CHANGING FACILITIES TO BE EXCLUSIVE MALE AND/OR FEMALE OR SINGLE-SEX OR FAMILY-USE AT A MINIMUM; TO CREATE NEW SECTION 29-18-11, MISSISSIPPI CODE OF 1972, TO REGULATE PUBLIC STUDENT HOUSING FOR SINGLE-SEX EDUCATIONAL HOUSING; TO CREATE NEW SECTION 29-18-13, MISSISSIPPI CODE OF 1972, TO REQUIRE SINGLE-SEX SOCIAL SORORITIES AND FRATERNITIES TO COMPLY WITH THE DEFINITIONS OF THIS ACT TO DESIGNATE HOUSING; TO CREATE NEW SECTION 29-18-15, MISSISSIPPI CODE OF 1972, TO REGULATE HOW PERSONS ENTER A SINGLE-SEX RESTROOM, CHANGING FACILITY OR EDUCATIONAL HOUSING SPACE; TO CREATE NEW SECTION 29-18-17, MISSISSIPPI CODE OF 1972, TO AUTHORIZE ASSERTION OF A VIOLATION OF THIS ACT; TO CREATE NEW SECTION 29-18-19, MISSISSIPPI CODE OF 1972, TO AUTHORIZE THE ATTORNEY GENERAL TO BRING ACTION REGARDING THE PROVISIONS OF THIS ACT; TO CREATE NEW SECTION 1-3-83, MISSISSIPPI CODE OF 1972, TO DEFINE THE TERMS "FEMALE," "MALE" AND "SEX"; AND FOR RELATED PURPOSES.
- Territorial extent: Mississippi
- Signed by: Tate Reeves
- Signed: May 13, 2024
- Effective: July 1, 2024

Summary
- Restricts access to single-sex facilities such as restrooms and locker rooms in schools to that of biological sex and not gender identity, and allows for lawsuits against those who violate the law.
- Status: In force

Mississippi Senate Bill 2753 (SB 2753), also known as the Securing Areas for Females Effectively and Responsibly (SAFER) Act, is a 2024 law in the state of Mississippi that restricts access to student housing and restrooms, along with other related facilities, to that of biological sex and not gender identity. It was signed into law by Governor Tate Reeves on May 13, 2024, and took effect on July 1.

Senate Bill 2753 has been accused of being anti-transgender and seeking to remove legal recognition of transgender people. It is designed to build off of the Mississippi Fairness Act, a transgender sports ban.

== Provisions ==
Senate Bill 2753 requires schools in Mississippi to designate single-sex facilities, including bathrooms and locker rooms, among others. It defines man and woman according to biological sex. It allows for legal action if somebody discovers a transgender person using any specified facility that does not align with their biological sex, classifying it as an "invasion of privacy." The bill specifically notes that intersex people are not classified as a third sex. Exceptions under the law include assisting a child under 12 years old, assisting a disabled person, administering medical care, and other emergency situations. Schools cannot be sued due to the law. Another provision in SB 2753 states that if part of the law is declared unconstitutional by the courts, it is removed from the law to allow for the rest to remain in force.

== Reactions ==
=== Support ===
Governor Reeves, who signed the bill into law, stated that the bill would protect Mississippi's daughters, simultaneously attacking President Biden for "causing it to get to that point."

=== Opposition ===
The ACLU of Mississippi, in a statement to CNN, referred to SB 2753 as discriminatory.

== See also ==
- Bathroom bill
- LGBTQ rights in Mississippi
