= Discrimination against rural people =

Discrimination against people from rural areas, also called rural discrimination or rural stigma, represents a confrontation between rural and urban populations, manifesting in various dimensions of daily life, including social, cultural, labor, and economic aspects. These circumstances arise within a framework of behaviors characterized by contempt, stigmatization, rejection, mockery and ridicule, among other adverse and negative attitudes directed toward individuals who were either born or raised in a rural setting, such as a farm or a small village. These discriminatory behaviors can appear against an individual or a group of individuals just because of their origin, as well as because of their manners, habits, traditions or idiosyncrasies that reveal a difference with urban people or an urban group, can be classified as a type of cultural shock.

== Rural people in an urban environment ==
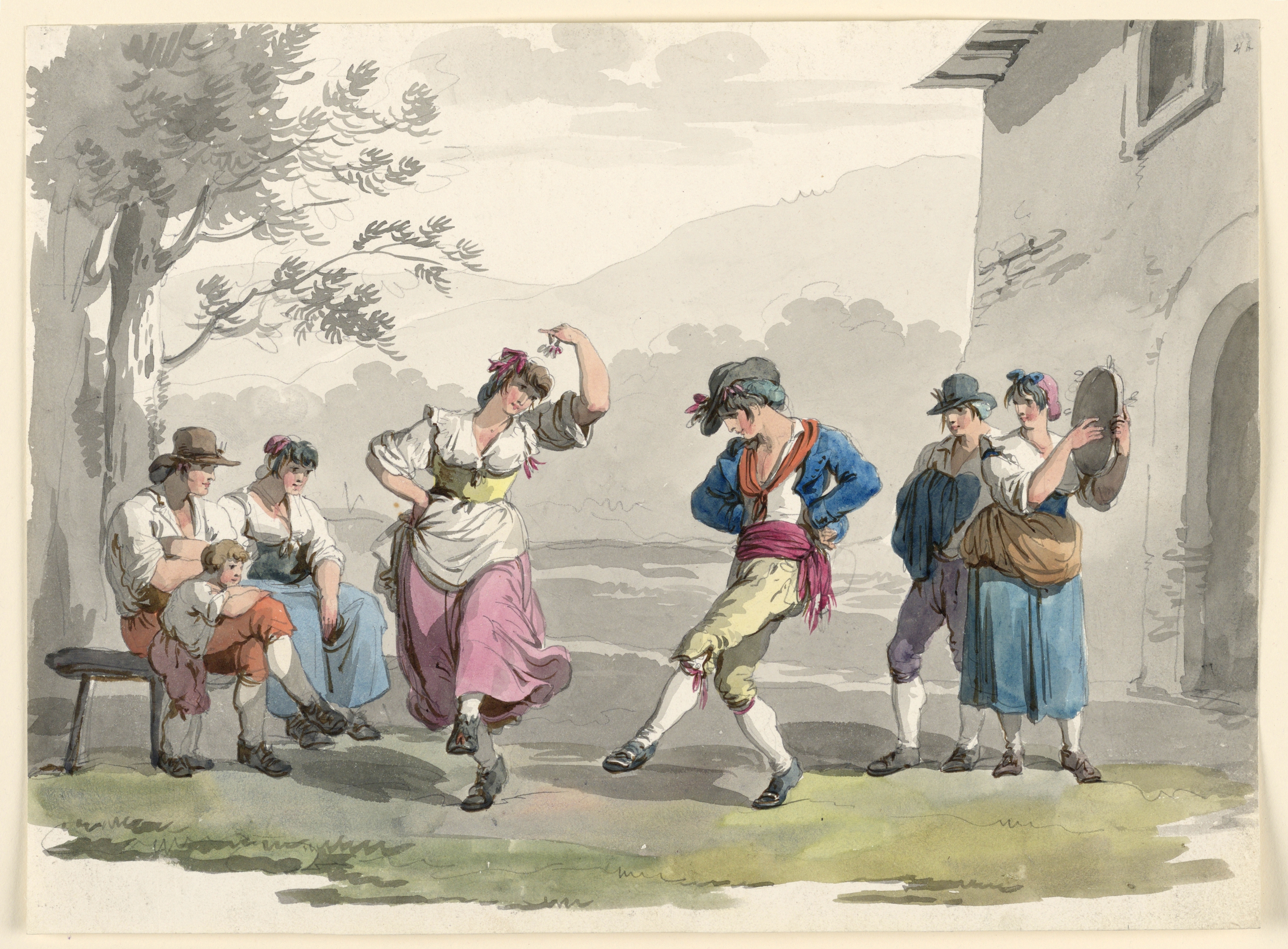
Families of peasant origin living in urban areas have maintained certain traditions, forming a subculture that endures through successive generations

As part of rural-to-urban migration, inhabitants of rural origin face challenging and disadvantageous conditions when arriving in a large urban agglomeration. The knowledge they have about agriculture or livestock farming becomes obsolete in these spaces of large cities, where the labor field is largely destined for services.

Discrimination based on whether individuals are perceived as coming from urban or rural areas can vary significantly depending on the context. For example, in a metropolitan area with a population of 10 million, a city with 1 million residents may be viewed as a "town," with all the negative connotations that this would bring from the perspective of the discriminator. Similarly, in a city of 1 million inhabitants, a city with a population of 300,000 may be regarded as lesser in status, and this pattern continues across different population sizes. Given this heterogeneity, researchers generally use case study methodology to conduct analyses on this topic. Additionally, perceptions of rural dwellers —both positive and negative— vary significantly across different countries. This encompasses a range of perspectives, from negative stereotypes to idealized representations of rural life and communities.

The term "urban narcissism" or also called "geographic narcissism" refers to the tendency of individuals residing in large cities to perceive themselves as more advanced, sophisticated, or superior compared to those from smaller towns or rural areas, solely based on their urban background.

== Undervaluation of rural knowledge ==
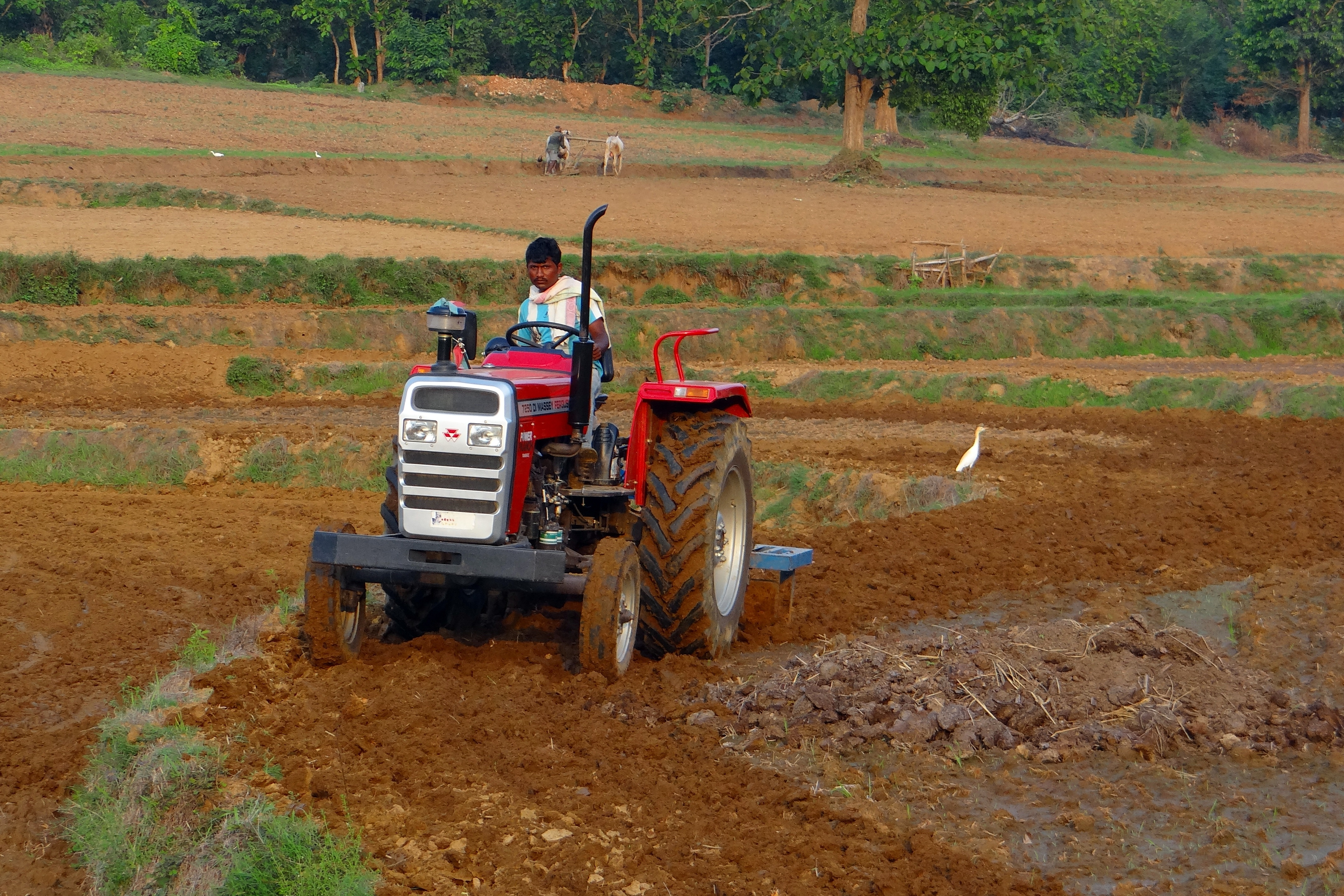
Rural knowledge has been refined over time, encompassing advanced technologies and traditional techniques honed through generations of practice

While at the same time there is an idealization of the rural environment from some urban areas, paradoxically, one frequently discussed aspect of discrimination against people from rural areas is the low societal recognition of knowledge acquired in rural contexts. Skills such as handling agricultural tools, traditional craftsmanship, animal husbandry, or knowledge of natural cycles are often granted little prestige in urban environments. While such competencies are essential in rural everyday life, they are sometimes perceived in urban societies as outdated, unskilled, or of lesser value.

This devaluation of rural competences may appear in various areas of life, including the labor market, education, and social interactions. Individuals from rural backgrounds may experience that their practical skills or experiences are not recognized as "formal qualifications," even though they carry significant functional value. In academic literature, this phenomenon is sometimes described as an expression of a cultural capital gap between urban and rural populations.

== Use of pejoratives ==
Pejorative terms for rural populations are widespread across languages and often serve to reinforce stereotypes of backwardness, poverty, or lack of sophistication. In English, expressions such as redneck, hick, or hillbilly are used both within and outside rural communities in the United States and Canada, sometimes reclaimed but frequently derogatory. Spanish includes terms like villero in Argentina or chacarero (or chacrero, from "chacra") in Chile and the Southern Cone; in Peru, the term "serrano" (which comes from the mountains) is used in urban settings, especially in Lima, as a pejorative term for people from the Peruvian highlands, while Portuguese uses saloio in Portugal and caipira in Brazil in a similar way. In Chinese, xiāngbālǎo (乡巴佬, "country bumpkin") conveys rustic ignorance, and in Russian, derevenshchina (деревенщина) has comparable meaning. Other examples include paysan in French when used dismissively, burino in Italian, culchie in Ireland is used predominantly by people from Dublin to refer to those living outside the city, and yokel is used in British English as a derogatory term stereotyping rural people as being unsophisticated. In Australia and New Zealand, the term bogan is used for similar purposes. Scholars highlight that such labels reflect urban–rural divides, often carrying connotations of low social status and exclusion from dominant cultural norms.

== Intersectionality ==
Rural discrimination does not affect everyone in the countryside the same way. Intersectionality helps to understand how people in rural areas can face multiple, overlapping forms of exclusion based on more than just where they live. There are various factors that directly influence discrimination, such as social class, ethnic group, gender, sexual orientation, and other situations, such as age and disabilities.

== See also ==
- Rural diversity
- Rural women
- Rural LGBTQ people
