= Mississippi Senate Bill 3074 =

2000 Mississippi adoption law

An Act to Amend Section 93-17-3, Mississippi Code of 1972, To Conform Adoption Provisions to the Licensure of Nurse Practitioners; To Prohibit Adoption by Same Gender Couples; and For Related Purposes, also called the Mississippi Adoption Ban, is a 2000 Mississippi anti-LGBT statute that amended state law to prohibit adoption by "couples of the same gender", and also allows adoption certificates to be issued by a nurse practitioner instead of a doctor.

== History ==
On March 15, 2000, the Mississippi State Senate passed SB 3074, a bill that prohibits same gendered couples from adoption in the state of Mississippi. On March 23, 2000, the Mississippi House of Representatives passed SB 3074. On May 3, 2000, Governor Ronnie Musgrove signed SB 3074, it became Chapter 535 and the bill went into effect on July 1, 2000.

On March 20, 2013, Ronnie Musgrove described how his views had changed and that the law "made it harder for an untold number of children to grow up in happy, healthy homes in Mississippi–and that breaks my heart". On August 12, 2015, the Campaign for Southern Equality, the Family Equality Council, and four Mississippi same-sex couples filed a lawsuit challenging that ban in federal court.

On March 31, 2016, the Federal district court struck down the law as a violation of the federal XIV amendment.

== See also ==
- LGBT rights in Mississippi
