= Rural diversity =

Rural diversity refers to the presence of a diverse population of people in a low-density area outside of a city. While the term "rural" is contextual, it generally refers to a relatively low population density, a land-based economy (particularly agricultural), and a distinct regional identity. Some researchers have defined rurality as existing on a continuum. A report estimates that in 2020, 43.85% of the world's population was living in rural areas. However, the United Nations predicts that this number will shrink in the coming years; projecting that 68% of the world's population will live in urban areas by 2050. Rural areas may lack diversity in demographics like religion, race, ethnicity, sexual orientation, gender identity, mental health, socioeconomic status, physical ability, or other socially significant identifiers.

Diversity in a rural context is different from urban diversity in that the underrepresented populations of those of the identities listed above are usually numerically smaller than might be found in cities. However, some researchers have suggested that trends indicate the distinction between urban and rural diversity, in terms of community ethnoracial composition, has become less clear. The small size of many rural communities still means that many of these groups tend to be relatively invisible or go unnoticed, oftentimes to avoid drawing attention to themselves as a defense to avoid rejection by the majority. For example, although almost 20% of the United States' rural population is non-white, and a similar proportion of the nation's LGBTQ+ people also live in rural areas, rural areas are often depicted as completely heterosexual and white. This lack of visibility can result in a deficiency of resources for marginalized populations in rural areas, inadequate policies that fail to take the experiences of the underrepresented populations into account, and a general misunderstanding of rural populations.

== Academic research ==
There has been a renewed interest in rural diversity. Research on the subject tends to focus on highlighting previously ignored non-white rural communities and formerly all-white regions that are now diversifying due to Hispanic immigration.

=== U.S. Department of Agriculture ===
The 2006 U.S. Department of Agriculture Economic Research Service studied rural populations across America. This study displayed the increasing racial and ethnic diversity in rural America. This study displayed the increasing immigration and Hispanic population in non-metro areas across America. This study also revealed the poverty distribution in non-metro areas across races and ethnicities in 2006.

=== Pew Research Center ===
The 2018 study titled "What Unites and Divides Urban, Suburban, and Rural Communities" researched by the Pew Research Center examines demographic trends across America, categorized as either suburban, urban, or rural. When regarding racial and ethnic rural diversity, this study reveals, through surveying, how rural counties are becoming more racially and ethnically diverse at a significantly slower pace than suburban and urban counties.

=== Center For American Progress ===
A study titled "Redefining Rural America" was published in 2019 by the Center For American Progress. It is authored by Olugbenga Ajilore and Zoe Willingham. The study investigated industrial diversity in rural areas. Moreover, it investigated challenges faced by minorities in rural areas, such as people of color, immigrants, LGBTQ people and disabled people. The study concluded that rural America is more actually economically diverse than perceived.

=== MDRC ===
A study was published by MDRC in 2020 about College Access Strategies in Rural Communities of Color. It was authored by Alyssa Ratledge. It investigated educational challenges unique to Rural communities such as black, Latino and native American. The paper presented strategies to help increase diversity amongst rural colleges.

== In the United States ==
Rural parts of the United States encompass 97% of the US landmass and nearly 20% of its population. Every type of diversity that exists in metropolitan areas also exists in rural areas, however, the way that diversity manifests itself may be different based on local context.

=== Race and ethnicity ===
In rural areas in the Southeast, West, and Southwest U.S., there are significant populations of African-Americans, Hispanic people, and Native Americans. 54% of Native Americans live in rural areas, a much higher percentage of the population than for other racial and ethnic groups. 14% of Black Americans live in rural areas, primarily in the Southeast and especially in the Black Belt states of Mississippi, Alabama, Georgia, and Louisiana. 12% of Hispanic population in the US lives in rural areas, and that number is projected to grow as Hispanic populations increase nationwide. Although rural Hispanic populations have typically been concentrated in the Southwest and West, in the past 20 years Hispanic populations have grown throughout the Midwest and Great Plains.

=== Ability ===
Despite the portrayal of rural Americans as primarily able bodied, strong farmers, people in rural America have varying levels of physical ability. At 15.1%, the disability rate in rural America is higher than the country as a whole (11.7%). Compounded with the issue of medical deserts that affect many rural communities, disabled people in rural areas are more likely to receive inadequate care than their peers in urban areas. A lack of public transportation in most rural areas creates an additional barrier for people with disabilities to be integrated into their communities.

=== Sexuality ===
About fifteen to twenty percent of LGBTQ+ people in the United States live in rural and urban areas. However, residents of rural areas are less likely to be open about their sexuality due to the discrimination and violent threats they may face. These discriminations and threats are partially due to the public opinion in rural areas not supporting LGBTQ+ individuals. This leads to less nondiscrimination laws and laws that may negatively effect LGBTQ+ individuals. The lack of people who openly identify as LGBQT+ leads to the lack of resources for them throughout the rural communities. In rural southern Appalachia areas, social support from the community is being focused on in response to the lack of support in LGBTQ+ members' families.

=== Socioeconomic status ===
Socioeconomic status has a significant impact on rural communities, according to researchers. Socioeconomic variables are believed to be one of the main contributing factors as to why mortality rates are higher in rural settings. The main causes for this disparity is socioeconomic deprivation, higher rates of uninsured persons, and a lack of and access to primary care physicians. A 2012 study revealed that 16.3 percent of the rural population live in poverty. When looking at the poverty rate of racially diverse populations, it is observed that the rate is nearly doubled compared to white non-hispanics in rural communities. Rural African Americans have the highest poverty rates of almost 34 percent.

=== Employment ===
Though rural America is frequently associated with agriculture, not all rural economies depend on farming. Many rely on sectors like manufacturing, mining, and the oil and gas industry. Jobs in the service industry, education, healthcare, and construction also employ large sections of the rural workforce. The United States Department of Agriculture states that employment in rural America is continuing to grow, but is still below pre-Great Recession numbers.

== In media and art ==
=== Films ===
Well-known films about rural communities are often primarily white. The popular film, Brokeback Mountain, made in 2005 featuring Jake Gyllenhaal and Heath Ledger, portrays a rural America centered around a white community. This film shows a rural area that is mostly white and heteronormative. The main two characters, played by Ledger and Gyllenhaal have a secret love affair-unable to come out as gay to their community. Another film, Three Billboards Outside Ebbing, Missouri made in 2017, also features rural America. This film chronicles the murder investigation of a young woman. This film is highly regarded but has been accused of being a "shallow look at rural America, especially in regards to race." Film portrayals of rural communities often display a homogenous community, contributing to the common perception that rural diversity is non-existent.

=== Books ===
The 2016 memoir Hillbilly Elegy is often regarded as a 21st-century portrait of the rural American experience and culture. JD Vance's book is centered around the experience of a white boy growing up in rural poverty. This book is well-known as an all-encompassing representation of rural America, despite not offering much information on other, more diverse, rural experiences. In response to this portrayal of rural America, Elizabeth Catte, attempts to diversify this the rural Appalachian narrative in her book What You Are Getting Wrong About Appalachia by looking back at the history of the region.

=== Television shows ===
The 1960s and 1970s sitcom, The Beverly Hillbillies, depicted a poor, white family from the Ozark Mountains that suddenly made a lot of money after finding oil on their land. The family then moved to Beverly Hills. This television show played into the classic rural stereotype of a poor, white, and 'redneck' family.

=== Music ===
American folk music is often associated with rural areas, particularly Oklahoma, Appalachia, and the Southwest. Country music is also often affiliated with rural areas. Country music is more associated with the southern part of the United States than American Folk music is.

=== Podcasts ===
Podcasts about rural life are all-encompassing. There are podcasts for many different topics, from health and education to business and politics. Some podcasts that cover these topics are Rural Matters, Rural Health Leadership Radio, and Rural Business. Outside of the U.S. there are also podcast about these topics in rural areas. Some of these include RZN: Rural News in rural New Zealand, Irish Farmers Journal Weekly Podcast in rural Ireland, and Country Breakfast in rural Australia.

=== Poetry ===
Poems about rural life are common, as pastoral poetry has been a common topic. These poems often focus on and are associated with nature, but also focus on rural communities and the poets' own experience within those communities. There are many rural Native American poets, including Tommy Pico, Joy Harjo, and Layli Long Soldier.

=== Affrilachia ===
Affrilachian art is a term that encompasses poetry, fiction, music, and film created by communities of African American Appalachians. The term was coined by Kentucky-based poet Frank X Walker. It was created to highlight the experiences of Black Appalachians and broaden the scope of perception around Appalachian communities beyond just White Appalachia.

== See also ==
- Rural sociology
- Rural area
- Diversity (politics)
- Cultural diversity
- Discrimination against people from rural areas
