= Rural LGBTQ people =

The conditions of LGBT people in rural areas in the United States encompass a spectrum of experiences, influenced by geographic, cultural, and social contexts. The rural population of the U.S. exists across a wide geographical area, containing within it a broad diversity of cultural constructs and attitudes which in turn influence the varied experiences of rural LGBT people and communities within the United States.

Contemporary scholars of the American South and Midwest have written studies and fieldwork on queer life in rural areas, challenging the perceived orthodoxy that rurality is inherently not conducive to queer sexual expression.

== Rural queer lifestyle ==
Masculine gender representations operate distinctly for women in rural areas because labor done by members of both sexes may be perceived outside of rural communities as masculine: rural women exhibit features and behavior that may be characterized as masculine, and enjoy acceptance within their rural communities. This masculine dynamic allows for some lesbians to blend in quite easily, where typical female attire can be wearing flannels and cowboy boots. However, deviations in style, such as short hair or wearing ties, can still result in judgment from the woman's surrounding community. Emily Kayzak notes that "the sexual identity of rural butch lesbian women is not invisible in urban lesbian cultures, their more butch gender presentations do not do the same work in rural areas because those gender presentations are also tied to normative (hetero)sexuality". Rural spaces have even been referred to as makings for "lesbian lands".

For rural men, on the other hand, "publicly disrupting normative gender expectations arguably remains as, if not more, contentious than homoerotic desires". In many places, as long as a gay man subscribes to masculine representations and activities, such as wearing traditionally masculine attire and working in manual labor, acceptance comes much more easily.

Queer individuals in rural areas face discrimination and violence. In small rural areas, perpetrators and victims are typically known to the surrounding community. Even police are known to commit crimes against sexually marginalized people.

In contrast, queer urbanites have gained much more acceptance and visibility as a result of gay rights movements and the recognition of the potential of the queer economy. Higher urban acceptance of homosexuality, and urban institution of gay cultural centers (such as gay neighborhoods, bars, and other establishments) have led to an increase of the migration of queer people from rural communities to metropolitan areas. Research on migration patterns between urban and rural areas also challenges a binary view of the two categories as well as the common narrative that queer-identifying individuals 'escape' to the city over the course of their lives. In Coming Out and Coming Back: Rural Gay Migration and the City, authors Meredith Redlin and Alexis Annes find that the migratory flow between urban and rural is not unidirectional, but rather a series of movements over time between the two spaces. Their essay illustrates how queer individuals move within and between rural and urban areas in response to the ways that each space limits and/or enables their identity formation and sexual expression.

== Rural queer farmers ==
Rural queer farmers have been studied to complicate ideals such as feminine "labor of the home" and masculine "labor of the field", which mark the conventional standard for gendered agriculture, but expectations of masculinity and femininity do not directly correlate with a particular type of farm practice for queer farmers. Janet Casey's research provides an example of attention to the rural body and material conditions as they relate to predominant images—like "labor, health, childbirth, and childcare" Queer farmers grapple with these assumptions about a female laboring body, but they also grapple with assumptions about the nature-dominating male laboring body. Queer farmers often organize in family structures and labor structures based around community and ambiguous role-definitions.

Some queer farmers have taken to growing food in urban environments, so that they can maintain their agricultural practices as well as queer lifestyles.

Identity has been identified as an important component to the construction of queer farm life. Gender research on queer rural farmers has considered the role of space in queer identity formation. Berit Brandth, a sociologist and gender labor researcher, argues that attention to "identity and place and to the co-construction of rurality and subjectivity prompted more critical and theoretically informed approaches to the study of rural gender."

In the 1970s, women began to move to agricultural communes where they could live and work with other "country women". In these communities, lesbian women built communes where they grew their own food and created societies away from men. They believed that living and working in nature allowed them to embrace their inherent connection with nature. Gay men also partook in similar activities; Bell and Valentine note how the Edward Carpenter Community in England hosts Gay Men's Weeks where they conduct events related to free-spiritedness and the embracement of one's sexuality.

Farmers and Friends, a helpline for closeted gay farmers in England, was created to help farmers deal with discrimination and to provide emotional support.

== Queer rural political activism in the United States ==
Many queer political organizers believe reform is more difficult to pass in rural communities that are less tolerant of queer lifestyles. It is harder to mobilize communities in rural spaces where queer populations are less dense and financial contributions are limited.

A lack of visibility and political attention has left queer people more vulnerable to institutional discrimination. Compared to the heterosexual population, they have reduced access to housing and healthcare and face greater employment discrimination. In South Dakota, only 29% of rural same-sex households own homes, compared to 84% of married heterosexual couples. There are generally fewer community resources and support groups for queer individuals in rural areas, as more limited local resources do not facilitate their existence.

Stereotypes about rural intolerance have been identified as a vector of discrimination in the United States judicial system. In a 2006 custody case, a mother found herself unfit to care for her child and relinquished rights to a queer caretaker. Once the new guardian's sexuality was discovered the court ruled against the biological mother's request, stating that "the adoption would not be in the best interest of the child." The court used rurality in their reasoning to reject the request, citing "stigma that the child may face growing up in a small, rural town with two women, in whose case she was placed at the age of six, who openly engage in a homosexual relationship."

The Iowa Supreme Court struck down the state's defense of marriage statute, which made it one of the first states to allow same-sex marriage, affecting the predominantly rural population. This action was met with political resistance. The Iowa electorate voted to not retain all three judges, marking the first time in Iowa's history that a judge had not been retained since 1961.

Queer visibility, which has been identified as playing a critical role in political activism, has not been a viable strategy for some rural queer people. Being openly queer can lead to more discrimination and isolation in rural spaces. Rural queer individuals have had to reimagine how to make political and social progress in their communities. Regional scholars have argued that the reliance upon visibility politics within queer activism in the United States is urban-centric, excluding and erasing LGBT individuals and communities in rural areas across the globe. As the majority of national-scale queer activism reliant on visibility politics within the U.S. emerged from its major cities, this ideology was "tailor-made for and from the population densities; capital; and systems of gender, sexual, class, and racial privilege that converge in cities."

New digital media has opened more political options for rural queer people. Access to queer people's experiences are available on blogs and websites and provide access to the terminology needed to describe and understand their experiences. Today, Instagram functions as a site of activism to cultivate a queer farming community. Queer farming communities visible on Instagram present political stances as valuable components of their farming practices, such as in hiring efforts.

== Perceptions ==
Many Americans assume rural queer people do not exist, or that they do only before moving to more urban and accepting communities.

Stereotypes about rural homosexuality are sometimes crude. In media, rustic sexual expression can take the form of homosexual rape, as seen in Pulp Fiction and Deliverance, and bestiality, which is also a theme in these films.

== See also ==
- Camp Sister Spirit
- Queer anti-urbanism
- Discrimination against people from rural areas
