= Carlton W. Reeves =

American judge (born 1964)

Carlton Reeves
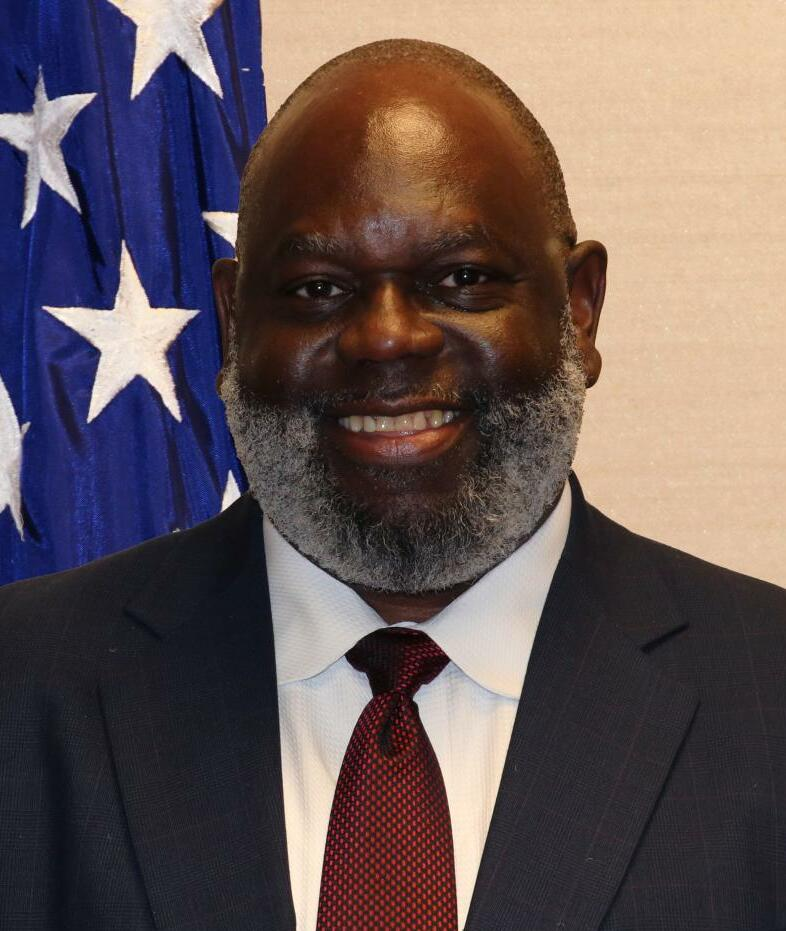
- Reeves in 2022

Chair of the United States Sentencing Commission
- Incumbent
- Assumed office August 5, 2022
- President: Joe Biden; Donald Trump
- Preceded by: Charles Breyer (acting)

Judge of the United States District Court for the Southern District of Mississippi
- Incumbent
- Assumed office December 20, 2010
- Appointed by: Barack Obama
- Preceded by: William H. Barbour Jr.

Personal details
- Born: Carlton Wayne Reeves; April 11, 1964 (age 62) Fort Hood, Texas, U.S.
- Education: Jackson State University (BA); University of Virginia (JD)
- Awards: Thomas Jefferson Foundation Medal (2019)

Carlton Wayne Reeves (born April 11, 1964) is a United States district judge of the United States District Court for the Southern District of Mississippi and chair of the United States Sentencing Commission.

Reeves was the district court judge in Dobbs v. Jackson Women's Health Organization (2022), the case that resulted in the Supreme Court overturning Roe v. Wade (1973).

== Early life and education ==
Reeves was born in 1964 in Fort Hood, Texas, and was raised in rural Yazoo City, Mississippi. Reeves was one of seven children, with three sisters and three brothers.

Reeves was a student in the first integrated public-school class in Mississippi. As a teenager, Reeves cleaned the office of Judge William H. Barbour Jr., whom he would later replace on the federal bench. Reeves was the first person in his family to attend a four-year college, and graduated in 1986 magna cum laude from Jackson State University. Reeves then attended the University of Virginia School of Law, graduating in 1989 as a Ritter Scholar. After law school, Reeves served as a law clerk for Justice Reuben V. Anderson, the first African American judge to serve on the Mississippi Supreme Court.

== Career ==
Reeves began his legal career in 1991 as a staff attorney for the Supreme Court of Mississippi; later that year, he entered private practice as an associate at the Jackson, Mississippi office of regional law firm Phelps Dunbar. From 1995 to 2001, Reeves served as Chief of the Civil Division for the Office of the United States Attorney for the Southern District of Mississippi. In 2001, Reeves returned to private practice to found his own firm, Pigott Reeves Johnson, in Jackson. During his time in private practice, Reeves served on the boards of a number of civic organizations, including the ACLU of Mississippi, the Mississippi Center for Justice, and the Magnolia Bar Association.

=== Federal judicial service ===
On April 28, 2010, Reeves was nominated by President Barack Obama to fill a seat on the United States District Court for the Southern District of Mississippi vacated by Judge William H. Barbour Jr. Reeves was confirmed by the United States Senate on December 19, 2010, by voice vote. Reeves is the second African American to serve on the federal judiciary in Mississippi. He received his commission on December 20, 2010.

=== Notable decisions ===
==== Campaign for Southern Equality v. Bryant ====
On November 25, 2014, Reeves ruled in the case of Campaign for Southern Equality v. Bryant that Mississippi’s same-sex marriage ban violated the Due Process and Equal Protection Clauses of the Fourteenth Amendment. Reeves' opinion noted the connection between racism and homophobia, and how that connection had long operated to oppress both black and LGBT Mississippians. Reeves held that, just as the state's views on race had led it to oppress blacks for generations, "Mississippi’s traditional beliefs about gay and lesbian citizens ... [took] away fundamental rights owed to every citizen. It is time to restore those rights."

==== United States v. Butler ====
On February 10, 2015, Reeves sentenced three young white men for their roles in the death of a 48-year-old black man named James Craig Anderson. They were part of a group that beat Anderson and then killed him by running over his body with a truck, yelling "white power" as they drove off. In handing down sentences of between 7 and 50 years in prison for the defendants, Reeves gave a widely publicized speech that remarked on how the killing of Anderson fit into Mississippi's "tortured past" of lynchings and racism. While noting that the defendants had "ripped off the scab of the healing scars of Mississippi," Reeves asserted that the integrated, race-neutral operation of Mississippi's modern-day justice system was "the strongest way" for the state to reject the racism of the past.

==== Barber v. Bryant ====
On June 30, 2016, Reeves issued a ruling that halted Mississippi's Religious Liberty Accommodations Act from going into effect. The Act provided protection to entities and individuals who refused to provide marriage-related goods and services to LGBT individuals. Reeves' holding noted that "[r]eligious freedom was one of the building blocks of this great nation, and after the nation was torn apart, the guarantee of equal protection under [the] law was used to stitch it back together. But [the Act] does not honor that tradition of religiou[s] freedom, nor does it respect the equal dignity of all of Mississippi's citizens. It must be enjoined."

In June 2017 a panel of judges from the United States Court of Appeals for the Fifth Circuit reversed Judge Reeves ruling in a 3–0 decision, finding that the plaintiffs lacked standing. The Religious Liberty Accommodations Act was reinstated.

==== Moore v. Bryant ====
On September 8, 2016, Reeves issued a ruling dismissing a lawsuit seeking to have the Mississippi state flag, which contains the Stars and Bars emblem of the Confederacy declared unconstitutional. The basis of the dismissal is the plaintiff's failure to allege a specific injury and thus an inability to demonstrate the standing necessary to bring an action in federal court.

==== Jackson v. Currier ====
On November 20, 2018, Reeves issued a written ruling in Jackson Women's Health Organization v. Currier (Mary Currier in her official capacity as the State Health Officer of the State of Mississippi). The ruling struck down a Mississippi law, passed in March 2018, that outlawed most abortions after the 15th week of pregnancy. Reeves had previously issued an injunction, effectively preventing the law from taking effect. His ruling included strong statements about the law, calling it "pure gaslighting" as well as an unconstitutional limitation on women's due-process rights. His ruling also invalidated a similar Louisiana law, which had been written as contingent on the outcome of the Mississippi lawsuit.

Reeves' decision was upheld by the U.S. Court of Appeals. In October 2020, shortly after Justice Ruth Bader Ginsburg's death, the Attorney General for Mississippi filed a petition with the U.S. Supreme Court seeking review of the ruling. The Court granted certiorari to the petition on May 17, 2021, limiting the case to the single question "Whether all pre-viability prohibitions on elective abortions are unconstitutional." The case was heard in December 2021, and in June 2022 the Supreme Court ruled in favor of Mississippi, overturning its prior rulings in favor of abortion rights in Roe v. Wade and Planned Parenthood v. Casey. This not only reversed Reeves' initial decision in the same case, but also obviated his decision enjoining as unconstitutional a subsequent Mississippi statute that purported to ban abortion as of six weeks past the patient's last menstrual period.

==== Jackson Women's Health Org. v. Dobbs ====
Mississippi Governor Phil Bryant signed a law scheduled to go into effect on July 1, 2019, that would ban abortions later than six weeks of pregnancy. The Center for Reproductive Rights challenged the law. Because of his decision finding the prior, less restrictive, "15-week" law in the Currier case to be unconstitutional, Reeves began his decision by writing, "Here we go again. Mississippi has passed another law banning abortions prior to viability." He inquired, "Doesn't it boil down to six is less than fifteen?", adding that the new law "smacks of defiance to this court." Reeves noted that although there were exceptions for situations where the mother's life or health is endangered should pregnancy be taken to term, the law does not allow for exceptions in the cases of pregnancies resulting from rape or incest.

Subsequently, the Supreme Court accepted Dobbs v. Jackson Women's Health Organization.

==== Jamison v. McClendon ====
On August 4, 2020, Reeves wrote an opinion upholding the grant of qualified immunity in a case against a Richland, Mississippi police officer. The opinion stated that the two-hour traffic stop of Clarence Jamison by Officer Nick McClendon should have resulted in a Fourth Amendment violation, but he was limited to uphold prior decisions by the US Supreme Court. Reeves' ruling gives a history of minority deaths that have occurred over the decades, and argues that the doctrine of qualified immunity must be done away with. Austin Sarat, writing in Justia, compares Reeves' opinion to "great dissents written by Supreme Court justices". CNN quotes a portion of the opinion:

The Constitution says everyone is entitled to equal protection of the law -- even at the hands of law enforcement. Over the decades, however, judges have invented a legal doctrine to protect law enforcement officers from having to face any consequences for wrongdoing. The doctrine is called "qualified immunity." In real life it operates like absolute immunity.

==== J.W. v. City of Jackson ====
On March 23, 2023, Reeves issued a lengthy opinion holding that the City of Jackson had violated the due process rights of over 1,000 children by intentionally misleading them to consume lead contaminated water. The plaintiffs brought bodily integrity claims and state-created danger claims, but under Fifth Circuit case law, only the bodily integrity claims survived. Reeves' opinion criticized the circuit court for not recognizing the right to state-created danger, stating that "The Fifth Circuit’s categorical bar on holding government actors accountable for the dangers they create or enhance has also had nightmarish consequences for ordinary citizens." Reeves dismissed some defendants, including the mayor, on qualified immunity grounds.

==== United States of America v. Bullock ====
On June 28, 2023, Reeves struck down the felon-in possession statute as applied against the defendant, Jesse Bullock. The opinion is a critique of both the Supreme Court's expansion of Second Amendment rights in New York State Rifle & Pistol Association, Inc. v. Bruen and originalism.

==== Green v. Thomas ====
In an order denying qualified immunity for police detective Jacquelyn Thomas, Reeves critiqued the Supreme Court's establishment and expansion of qualified immunity.

=== Appointment to United States Sentencing Commission ===
On May 11, 2022, President Joe Biden announced his intent to nominate Reeves to serve as a member of the United States Sentencing Commission. On May 12, 2022, his nomination was sent to the Senate, he has been nominated to fill the position and chairmanship left vacant by Judge Patti B. Saris, whose term expired. On June 8, 2022, a hearing on his nomination was held before the Senate Judiciary Committee. On July 21, 2022, his nomination was reported out of committee by a voice vote, with six Republican senators voting “no” on record. On August 4, 2022, the United States Senate confirmed his nomination by a voice vote.

== See also ==
- List of African-American federal judges
- List of African-American jurists

Legal offices
Preceded by William H. Barbour Jr.	Judge of the United States District Court for the Southern District of Mississippi; 2010–present	Incumbent
