= Mississippi Library Commission =

Official library agency of Mississippi

Coordinates: 32.3395°N 90.1470°W

Agency overview
- Formed: 1926
- Jurisdiction: State of Mississippi
- Headquarters: 3881 Eastwood Drive Jackson, MS
- Agency executive: Jennifer Lena, Executive Director
- Website: mlc.lib.ms.us

The Mississippi Library Commission (MLC) is the official library agency of Mississippi located in Jackson, Mississippi. It was established in 1926 by an Act of the Mississippi Legislature. It is overseen by a five-member Board of Commissioners.

The MLC maintains statewide databases of online resources, offers statewide networked access to MS public library catalogs, manages the Talking Book Services for print-disabled readers, and hosts the WPA County Files from Works Progress Administration programs in the 1930s. MLC publishes two quarterly newsletters, On the Same Page and The Reading Light.

== Building ==
The MLC's headquarters is a 60,000 square foot building built in 2005 that is open to the public. It was awarded the American Architecture Award in 2007.

== See also ==
- List of libraries in the United States
