= LGBTQ rights in Mississippi =

- Mississippi (USA)
- Legal status: Legal since 2003 (Lawrence v. Texas)
- Gender identity: Altering sex on identity documents does not require sex reassignment surgery
- Discrimination protections: Employment protections for sexual orientation and gender identity (Bostock v. Clayton County)

Family rights
- Recognition of relationships: Same-sex marriage since 2015
- Adoption: Joint and stepchild adoption legal

Lesbian, gay, bisexual, transgender, and queer (LGBTQ) people in the State of Mississippi face legal challenges and social stigma not experienced by non-LGBTQ residents. Same-sex sexual activity has been legal since 2003, following the U.S. Supreme Court decision in Lawrence v. Texas, though Mississippi’s sodomy law remains in the state code and individuals convicted prior to the ruling are still required to register as sex offenders. Same-sex marriage has been recognized since June 2015 in accordance with the Supreme Court's decision in Obergefell v. Hodges. Mississippi was the last state to allow same-sex couples to adopt, after a federal court struck down the state’s adoption ban in 2016.

State law does not prohibit discrimination based on sexual orientation or gender identity in employment, housing, or public accommodations. However, the U.S. Supreme Court's 2020 ruling in Bostock v. Clayton County held that employment discrimination against LGBTQ people is prohibited under federal law. Several cities, including Jackson, Clarksdale, Holly Springs and Magnolia have enacted local nondiscrimination ordinances, and others extend protections to municipal employees. The state has passed several religious exemption laws, most notably the 2016 Religious Liberty Accommodations Act (HB 1523), which has drawn national and international criticism.

Mississippi law does not address hate crimes motivated by sexual orientation or gender identity, though such crimes can be prosecuted federally under the 2009 Matthew Shepard and James Byrd Jr. Hate Crimes Prevention Act. Transgender rights are limited: the state bans gender-affirming healthcare for minors, restricts name changes for transgender youth until age 21, and bars transgender students from participating in school sports consistent with their gender identity. In 2024, the governor signed a law requiring public school students to use bathrooms corresponding to their sex assigned at birth.

Public opinion on LGBTQ rights in Mississippi has shifted over time. Once among the states most opposed to same-sex marriage, recent polling indicates majority support for a statewide anti-discrimination law covering sexual orientation and gender identity. Activism has continued at the local level; in 2018, Starkville hosted its first pride parade after initial permit denial, drawing an estimated 3,000 participants and becoming the largest parade in the city’s history.

== History ==
=== Pre-1970s: Early legal context ===
Mississippi first criminalized same-sex sexual activity in 1839 under its sodomy statute, which imposed penalties of up to 10 years’ imprisonment. For most of the state’s history, LGBTQ people had no legal protections and little public visibility. Social attitudes, shaped by Mississippi’s position in the Deep South and the Bible Belt, were broadly hostile toward homosexuality, and public discussion of LGBTQ issues was rare.

=== 1970s–1990s: Emergence of activism ===
Documented LGBTQ organizing in Mississippi began in the 1970s, though groups often operated discreetly due to pervasive stigma and the threat of arrest under sodomy laws. The first of these groups was the Mississippi Gay Alliance, founded in 1973. Its best known leader and spokesperson was Eddie Sandifer, an early pioneer of LGBTQ rights in Mississippi. Small community networks and student groups formed in university towns such as Oxford and Hattiesburg but public events were uncommon. The largest of these communities was Camp Sister Spirit, a feminist and lesbian retreat founded in Mississippi in 1993. The camp was often referred to as the "Stonewall of the South." One of the earliest public pride events in Mississippi occurred in 1992, when the National Organization for Women organized Oxford's first pride parade. The event had roughly 30 participants, who recall being heckled by the National Guard as they made their way to the University of Mississippi campus.

=== 2000–2010: Constitutional amendments and national debates ===
During this period, state lawmakers passed legislation further restricting LGBTQ rights, including a 2000 ban on adoption by same-sex couples. The same year, Mississippi Gay Lobby, later known as Equality Mississippi, was founded. The organization ran a series of television ads from 2001-2002, informing LGBTQ people across the state of the group's existence and offering support to gay and questioning youth. The campaign was met with criticism for Mississippi conservatives, with Mississippi Family Council president Forest Thigpen stating: "All people should be treated respectfully, but that doesn't change the fact that homosexuality itself is immoral and should be discouraged, not encouraged...I'm concerned that people who see them, especially young people who are still confused about life, will see the ads and make the wrong step toward that lifestyle, thinking that they will find answers there."

In 2004, Mississippi voters approved a constitutional amendment defining marriage exclusively as the union of one man and one woman, effectively banning same-sex marriage. Public opinion at the time showed overwhelming opposition to marriage equality, with 86% of voters in support of the amendment. Activists continued to press for change, but state courts and legislators consistently upheld the marriage ban and other restrictive measures.

=== 2010–present: Court rulings and legislative backlash ===
Legal challenges in the 2010s reshaped the landscape of LGBTQ rights in Mississippi. In 2014, Campaign for Southern Equality v. Bryant was filed, and in June 2015, the U.S. Supreme Court’s decision in Obergefell v. Hodges legalized same-sex marriage nationwide, overriding Mississippi’s ban. In 2016, a federal judge struck down the state’s ban on adoption by same-sex couples.

The same year, lawmakers passed the Religious Liberty Accommodations Act (HB 1523), allowing individuals and businesses to refuse services based on religious beliefs. HB 1523 was guided by conservative Christian groups, such as Alliance Defending Freedom, as a direct response to the legalization of same-sex marriage. The law drew national and international criticism but survived legal challenges.

In the 2020s, legislative attention turned toward transgender rights. Mississippi passed laws banning transgender students from competing in sports consistent with their gender identity, restricting bathroom access in public schools, and prohibiting gender-affirming care for minors under the Regulate Experimental Adolescent Procedures (REAP) Act in 2023.

== Legality of same-sex sexual activity ==
Mississippi enacted its first sodomy-related statute in 1839, defining the offense under common law as a "crime against nature." The law applied to both homosexual and heterosexual anal and oral sex, regardless of consent. The law was punishable by up to ten years imprisonment. Over time, the statute evolved in both language and interpretation.

In State v. Hill (1937), the Supreme Court of Mississippi ruled that cunnilingus was not a "crime against nature" and was therefore not criminalized under existing law. However, in 1942, the Mississippi Legislature authorized a recodification of state law. The Attorney General changed the statute's heading from "crime against nature" to "unnatural intercourse," which broadened its interpretation. This change allowed the state to prosecute fellatio as a criminal act under the revised statute, a position upheld in the 1955 case State v. Davis.

The sodomy law remained in effect throughout the 20th century and was upheld as constitutional twice by the Mississippi Supreme Court; first in State v. Mays (1976) and again in Miller v. State (1994). In 1995, the state passed a sex offender registration law requiring those convicted under the sodomy statute to register with local law enforcement. An earlier 1987 law permitted employers to request information from the State Attorney General regarding whether a potential hire had committed a sex offense―including consensual same-sex acts prosecuted under the sodomy statute.

Same-sex sexual activity has been legal in Mississippi since 2003, following the United States Supreme Court decision in Lawrence v. Texas, which invalidated all remaining sodomy laws nationwide. Despite this ruling, Mississippi's sodomy statute remains on the books, though it is currently unenforceable. However, individuals convicted under Mississippi’s sodomy law prior to the Lawrence decision are still required to register as sex offenders. In 2016, five Mississippi residents filed a federal lawsuit, arguing that being listed on the sex offender registry for consensual, constitutionally protected conduct violated their rights and severely limited their ability to find employment and housing. In 2023, it was reported that Mississippi taxpayers had incurred $400,000 in legal fees stemming from decades of litigation related to the state's sodomy law.

== Recognition of same-sex relationships ==
Mississippi banned same-sex marriage through multiple measures in the late 1990s and early 2000s. On August 24, 1996, Governor Kirk Fordice issued an executive order defining marriage as a union between one man and one woman. This was followed by a statutory ban that took effect on February 12, 1997. In 2004, 86.01% of Mississippi voters approved Constitutional Amendment 1, which amended the state constitution to prohibit same-sex marriage and the recognition of any same-sex unions.

On November 25, 2014, District Court Judge Carlton W. Reeves ruled Mississippi's ban on same-sex marriage unconstitutional in the case Campaign for Southern Equality v. Bryant. However, he issued a two-week stay on the ruling to allow the state to appeal. The Fifth Circuit Court of Appeals extended the stay on December 4, pending a final decision.

It has become clear to the court that people marry for a number of reasons: marriage is a profound source of emotional support; marriage is a private and public expression of commitment; some marry in exercise of their religious beliefs; some do so because it opens the door to economic and government benefits; there are those who marry to present a certain status or image; and others do it for the noble purpose of legitimizing their children. In reviewing the arguments of the parties and conducting its own research, the court determined that an objective person must answer affirmatively to the following questions:

- Can gay and lesbian citizens love?
- Can gay and lesbian citizens have long-lasting and committed relationships?
- Can gay and lesbian citizens love and care for children?
- Can gay and lesbian citizens provide what is best for their children?
- Can gay and lesbian citizens help make their children good and productive citizens?
- Without the right to marry, are gay and lesbian citizens subjected to humiliation and indignity?
- Without the right to marry, are gay and lesbian citizens subjected to state-sanctioned prejudice?

Answering "Yes” to each of these questions leads the court to the inescapable conclusion that same-sex couples should be allowed to share in the benefits, and burdens, for better or for worse, of marriage.

On June 26, 2015, the U.S. Supreme Court issued its decision in Obergefell v. Hodges, legalizing same-sex marriage nationwide. Mississippi's response was initially hesitant. Governor Phil Bryant opposed the ruling and some county clerks delayed issuing licenses to same-sex couples. On June 29, Attorney General Jim Hood informed the state's circuit clerks that they were required to comply with the Supreme Court ruling and that refusal to issue marriage licenses could result in lawsuits.

Since Obergefell, same-sex couples in Mississippi have had full access to marriage rights. However, the state’s statutory and constitutional bans remain part of its legal code and have not been repealed.

== Adoption and parenting ==
Mississippi has always permitted adoption by an unmarried adult, regardless of sexual orientation. However, in 2000, the state enacted a law banning adoption and fostering by same-sex couples.

By 2015, Mississippi was the only U.S. state still enforcing such a ban. In February 2013, former Governor Ronnie Musgrove, who had signed the law in 2000, publicly reversed his position, stating the ban "made it harder for an untold number of children to grow up in happy, healthy homes in Mississippi–and that breaks my heart."

On August 12, 2015, the Campaign for Southern Equality, the Family Equality Council, and four Mississippi same-sex couples filed a federal lawsuit challenging the ban. Their complaint noted that, as of 2014, 29% of Mississippi households headed by a same-sex-couple included children under the age of 18―the highest percentage in any U.S. state.

On March 31, 2016, U.S. District Judge Daniel Porter Jordan III issued a preliminary injunction striking down Mississippi's ban on adoption rights for same-sex couples, declaring it unconstitutional. A spokeswoman for the Attorney General stated, "We respect the district court's analysis of the law and will consult with the Department of Human Services on what options to take going forward." No appeal was filed, and the ruling became final on May 2, 2016, making Mississippi the final state in the United States to allow same-sex couples to adopt. One of the plaintiffs, Susan Hrostowski, said of the decision: "I've been waiting 16 years to be able to adopt my son, so I'm overjoyed about that."

Lesbian couples have access to in vitro fertilization. State law recognizes the non-genetic, non-gestational mother as a legal parent to a child born via donor insemination, but only if the parents are married. Surrogacy is neither expressly prohibited nor expressly permitted but courts are generally favorable to the practice. However, some judges may require additional legal steps or documentation that would not be asked of an opposite sex couple. Mississippi has historically resisted naming same-sex couples on birth certificates, though this has improved post-Obergefell. Second-parent adoption is legal in Mississippi and can provide security; however, couples may be required to marry in certain jurisdictions.

== Discrimination protections ==
Map of Mississippi cities that had sexual orientation and/or gender identity anti–employment discrimination ordinances prior to Bostock: Sexual orientation and gender identity with anti–employment discrimination ordinance Sexual orientation and gender identity solely in public employment Does not protect sexual orientation and gender identity in employment

Mississippi state law does not prohibit discrimination based on gender identity or sexual orientation in employment, housing, or public accommodations.

Some municipalities have enacted their own protections. The state capital, Jackson, and the cities of Clarksdale, Holly Springs, and Magnolia have ordinances banning discrimination based on sexual orientation and gender identity in public and private employment, housing and public accommodations. In addition, Hattiesburg, Oxford, and Starkville extend similar protections to city employees only.

=== Bostock v. Clayton County ===
On June 15, 2020, the U.S. Supreme Court ruled in Bostock v. Clayton County, consolidated with Altitude Express, Inc. v. Zarda, and R.G. & G.R. Harris Funeral Homes Inc. v. Equal Employment Opportunity Commission that workplace discrimination based on sexual orientation or gender identity constitutes discrimination based on sex under Title VII of the Civil Rights Act of 1964.

=== Religious freedom ===
Mississippi has several laws expanding religious exemptions, some of which have been criticized for enabling discrimination against LGBTQ people.

- Mississippi Religious Freedom Restoration Act ― Shields individuals from legal repercussions for expressing religious objections. The law was widely criticized, with many seeing it as allowing discrimination rather than protecting religious freedom. It was referred to as "Turn Away the Gays" or "Gay Jim Crow" legislation. Business owners Joce Pritchett and Eddie Outlaw co-founded a campaign in protest of the law with the slogan "If you're buying, we're selling." In May of 2014, less than one month after the law's passage, the campaign had over 3,000 donors.
- Religious Liberty Accommodations Act ― Protects individuals, religious organizations, and some businesses that act on the belief that (1) marriage is between one man and one woman, (2) sexual relations should be confined to such a marriage, and (3) gender is determined at birth based on anatomy and genetics. Following its passage, several states and cities banned official travel to Mississippi in protest. State Representative Steve Holland alleged that the state had lost 13 economic development projects in the months following the passage of HB 1523. The executive director of the Mississippi Development Authority later disputed this claim. The law was scheduled to take effect July 1, 2016, but U.S. District Court Judge Carlton W. Reeves issued a preliminary injunction on June 30 blocking its enforcement. On June 23, 2017, the Fifth Circuit Court of Appeals lifted the injunction, ruling that the plaintiffs lacked standing, and the law went into effect.

=== Local non-discrimination resolutions ===
Several Mississippi cities have passed non-binding resolutions expressing support for the LGBT community:

- Hattiesburg on February 18, 2014
- Oxford on March 4, 2014
- Magnolia on April 22, 2014
- Greenville on April 29, 2014
- Bay St. Louis on May 6, 2014
- Waveland on May 21, 2014
- Jackson on June 3, 2014
- Greenwood on April 19, 2016
- Rosedale; local non-discrimination ordinance implemented on the 17th June, 2021.

Starkville passed a similar resolution in January 2014, but the City Council voted 5–2 to repeal it on January 6, 2015. Mayor Parker Wiseman vetoed the repeal two days later, but on January 21, the council overrode his veto by a 5–2 vote.

== Healthcare ==
=== Conversion Therapy ===
Mississippi has no law or policy concerning conversion therapy. However, HB 1523 gives foster parents the freedom to subject their foster children to the practice. In 2024, a survey by The Trevor Project found that 8% of LGBTQ youth in Mississippi reported being subjected to conversion therapy, while an additional 12% said they had been threatened with it.

In 2014, the National Center for LGBTQ Rights (NCLR) filed a complaint on behalf of a DeSoto County man who had gone through conversion therapy as a teenager in the 1990s. The man, Jeff White, had been sent to Bethel Baptist School by his parents shortly after coming out. The school was run by a Southern Baptist church, who promised White's parents they could "cure" his homosexuality. While attending this school, White alleges that he was sexually assaulted on a weekly basis during his counseling sessions by teacher Stephen Barnes, who justified this as an attempt to make White hate men.

=== Gender-Affirming Care ===
On February 28, 2023, Governor Tate Reeves signed the "Regulate Experiment Adolescent Procedures" (REAP) Act, which bans gender-affirming care for individuals under the age of 18. Both chambers of the Mississippi Legislature had passed the bill earlier that month. Mississippi became the third state to enact such a ban in 2023, following Utah and South Dakota.

The state’s first clinic specializing in hormone replacement therapy (HRT) for transgender people is Spectrum: The Other Clinic in Hattiesburg. The clinic was opened in November, 2019. It offers HRT prescriptions to patients across Mississippi, Colorado, and Arizona, and operates entirely through virtual appointments, after ceasing in-person visits due to threats and harassment. Spectrum is the only remaining clinic specializing in care for LGBTQ+ people after the closure of the University of Mississippi Medical Center's Trustworthy, Evidence-Based, Affirming, and Multidisciplinary (TEAM) Clinic on June 30, 2023, in the wake of the REAP Act's passage.

=== HIV/AIDS ===
Mississippi has among the highest rates of new human immunodeficiency virus (HIV) diagnoses in the United States, with an infection rate of 17.8 per 100,000 residents compared to the national average of 11.2. African Americans are disproportionately affected; although they make up 38% of the state's population, they represent 78% of all reported HIV cases.

Homophobia, racism, and poverty have been cited as barriers to HIV/AIDS prevention and treatment in the state. Advocates note that stigma and discrimination against people of color are compounded for those who are also LGBTQ, while economic inequality limits access to preventive care such as pre-exposure prophylaxis (PrEP).

Mississippi also maintains HIV criminalization laws enacted during the height of the HIV/AIDS epidemic, which make it a felony to fail to disclose one's HIV-positive status to a sexual partner, even if transmission does not occur. Critics argue that these laws are based on outdated science; for example, spitting is criminalized despite no documented cases of HIV transmission through saliva. A 2024 report by the Williams Institute found that at least 43 people were arrested for HIV-related offenses in Mississippi between 2004 and 2021.

== Transgender rights ==
=== Identity documents ===
Transgender people in Mississippi could generally change the gender marker on their identity documents. In April 2025, the Mississippi Supreme Court ruled that a transgender teenager could not legally change his name until he turned 21, citing a "lack of maturity," despite the support of both parents. The court misgendered the teen throughout the ruling. While the legal age of majority in Mississippi is 21, minors are allowed to change their name in other circumstances if they have parental consent.

==== The Real You Act of 2022 ====
On January 17, 2022, State Senator Chad McMahan introduced The Real You Act, which sought to impose restrictions on name and gender changes. The bill would have:

- Prohibited incarcerated individuals convicted of a state or federal crime from petitioning for a name change unless requested by the district attorney, county sheriff, or the state Department of Corrections commissioner or chaplain.
- Required minors to obtain three written letters—from a physician, psychiatrist, and chancery clerk—before petitioning for a gender change.

The bill died in committee in February 2022, though a separate measure prohibiting inmate name changes was enacted.

==== Birth certificates ====
The Mississippi Vital Records office will issue an amended birth certificate with a new name and gender marker upon receipt of a certified court order, a medical statement attesting to gender reassignment, and the required fee. The amended certificate lists both the updated and original information.

==== Driver's licenses ====
From November 1, 2021, to March 2026, applicants wishing to update the gender marker on a driver’s license could submit a “Gender Designation Form” signed by a licensed professional, such as a physician or psychotherapist. Previously, the Department of Public Safety required a court order or an amended birth certificate.

In March 2026, the state passed a law that prohibits the issuance of driver's licenses with gender markers that do not reflect the holder's sex assigned at birth. This effectively prevents transgender residents from updating their documents to reflect their gender identity.

=== Sports ===
In 2021, the Mississippi Legislature passed SB 2536 banning transgender athletes from participating in sports teams or Olympic events that correspond with their gender identity. The Senate approved the bill 34–9 and the House 81–28. Under the law, any athlete whose sex is disputed must provide a physician’s statement verifying their genitalia, DNA, and hormone levels. Governor Tate Reeves signed the bill on March 11, 2021, with it taking effect on July 1.

=== Academia ===
In March 2025, the executive director of the Mississippi Library Commission ordered the removal of hundreds of academic research papers on gender studies and race relations from a state database, MAGNOLIA. This database is used by public libraries and schools, and it is funded by the state legislature. Executive Director Hulen Bivins claimed this was done to comply with a 2023 law, HB 1315, which regulates digital resources available to minors in public libraries. Bivins also cited pressure stemming from the Department of Government Efficiency's cuts to the Institute of Museum and Library Services' funding.

=== College bathrooms and dorms ===
On May 13, 2024, Governor Tate Reeves signed a law requiring individuals in public schools to use bathrooms consistent with the sex "determined solely by birth." The Mississippi Legislature had passed the bill earlier in May, and it took effect immediately.

== Hate crime law ==
Mississippi’s hate crime statute, enacted in 1994, increases penalties for crimes motivated by race, color, ancestry, ethnicity, religion, national origin, or actual or perceived disability. It does not include sexual orientation or gender identity as protected categories.

At the federal level, both categories are covered under the Matthew Shepard and James Byrd Jr. Hate Crimes Prevention Act, signed by President Barack Obama in 2009. Federal prosecutors can therefore pursue hate crime charges in cases involving LGBTQ victims in Mississippi, even when state law does not apply.

In 2017, for example, a Mississippi man was the first person to be prosecuted under the federal hate crime statute. The man, Joshua Vallum, murdered his former girlfriend after his friend and fellow gang member learned she was transgender. Vallum was sentenced to 49 years in federal prison for the crime.

== Freedom of expression ==
=== Public events ===
In 2018, the Starkville Board of Aldermen initially voted to deny a permit for an LGBT pride parade in the city. Following public backlash and legal action, the city reversed its decision and allowed the event to proceed. The parade was held on March 24, 2018, drawing approximately 3,000 participants and becoming the largest parade in Starkville’s history.

=== Student expression ===
LGBTQ students in Mississippi have faced persistent challenges in attending their school's prom. In a notable case from 2010, a federal court ruled that an Itawamba County school district had violated a lesbian student's First Amendment rights. Itawamba Agricultural High School had chosen to cancel the school prom rather than allow the student and her girlfriend to attend. The case drew national attention, with dozens of offers to host or help fund an alternative prom.

The Itawamba case also involved another common challenge for LGBTQ students in Mississippi, the dress code. In the Itawamba case, in addition to the student's sexual orientation, concerns were raised over her desire to wear a tuxedo. Dress code discrimination cases have continued into more recent years. In 2024, a civil complaint was filed against the Harrison County School District after a transgender girl was threatened with in-school suspension to prevent her from wearing a dress to a regional band event. The school's dress code had been updated the year prior to state that a student's clothing must match their sex assigned at birth. The American Civil Liberties Union (ACLU) argued that the rule violated Title IX by discriminating against students based on sex.

LGBTQ students have struggled to form clubs within their schools. In 2005, a 17-year-old Mississippi School of the Arts student wrote that her school counselor told her "there was no point in trying" to start a Gay-Straight Alliance. A decade later, the Rankin County School District came under fire for requiring students to receive their parent's permission to join a club. Superintendent Lynn Weathersby stated the rule was made in an effort to prevent students from joining "gay clubs." The ACLU and Human Rights Campaign (HRC) warned the district that they could be in violation of the 1984 Equal Access Act, the federal law that requires schools to allow Gay-Straight Alliance clubs to form.

== Public opinion ==
Polling over the past two decades shows significant changes in Mississippians’ views on LGBTQ rights, although support for many measures remains lower than the national average.

A 2017 Public Religion Research Institute (PRRI) survey found that 42% of Mississippi residents supported same-sex marriage, while 48% were opposed, making Mississippi one of the states most likely to oppose same-sex marriage, second only to Alabama. By 2024, PRRI reported that support for same-sex marriage in the state had risen to 54%.

Support for nondiscrimination protections is higher. A 2019 PRRI poll found that 68% of Mississippians favored laws that would protect gay, lesbian, bisexual, and transgender people from discrimination in jobs, housing, and public accommodations, with 23% opposed. By 2024, support reached 67%.

Compared to national averages, Mississippi tends to show lower support for same-sex marriage and transgender rights, but opinion gaps have narrowed over time. Generational differences are pronounced, with younger Mississippians showing significantly higher support for LGBTQ rights than older residents.

== Summary table ==
Same-sex sexual activity legal	Yes (Since 2003 under Lawrence v. Texas)
Equal age of consent	Yes
Anti-discrimination laws in employment	Yes (Since 2020 under Bostock v. Clayton County)
Anti-discrimination laws in housing and public accommodations	/ Yes (In some cities)
Same-sex marriages	Yes (Since 2015 under Obergefell v. Hodges)
Stepchild and joint adoption by same-sex couples	Yes (Since 2016)
Lesbian, gay and bisexual people allowed to serve openly in the military	Yes (Since 2011)
Transgender people allowed to serve openly in the military	(Banned since 2025)
Intersex people allowed to serve openly in the military	(Current DoD policy bans "hermaphrodites" from serving or enlisting in the military)
Right to change legal gender	Yes
Access to IVF for lesbian couples	Yes
Gay and trans panic defense banned	X
Conversion therapy banned on minors	X
Third gender option	X
Commercial surrogacy for gay male couples	Yes
MSMs allowed to donate blood	Yes / No (Since 2020; 3-month deferral period)

== See also ==
- LGBT rights in the United States
