= Mississippi Religious Freedom Restoration Act =

The Mississippi Religious Freedom Restoration Act is a 2014 act that states that "government should not substantially burden religious exercise without compelling justification. The act protects religious people from legal repercussions if they verbally condemn the lifestyle or actions of LGBTQ persons. Additionally, the bill expands the definition of an individual to include businesses, and so if a business owner thinks their religious beliefs would be violated by delivering service to an LGBT person, the Act allows them to deny them service, a move that some commentators have called "anti-gay segregation".

== Legislative history ==
On April 1, 2014, Mississippi House of Representatives passed, with 79 ayes, and 43 nays, Senate Bill 2681. On the same day, 2014, the Mississippi Senate passed, with a 37 ayes, 14 nays, and 1 absent or not voting, SB 2681. On April 3, 2014, Governor Phil Bryant signed the bill and it went into effect on July 1, 2014.

== Response ==
The Human Rights Campaign opposed SB 2681. It has also been criticized on grounds of using religious opinion to give cover to racial discrimination.

== See also ==
- LGBT rights in Mississippi
- State Religious Freedom Restoration Acts
