= Laurel Leader-Call =

Newspaper in Laurel, Mississippi

- Type: Tri-weekly newspaper
- Format: Broadsheet
- Owner(s): Gin Creek Publishing
- Publisher: Jim Cegielski
- Editor: Sean Murphy
- Founded: August 11, 1911, as The Laurel Daily Argus
- Headquarters: 318 North Magnolia Street, Laurel, Mississippi, United States
- Circulation: 8,000
- Website: leader-call.com

The Laurel Leader-Call is a thrice-weekly newspaper published Tuesdays, Thursdays and Saturdays in Laurel, Mississippi, United States, covering Jones County. It is owned by Gin Creek Publishing, which purchased the name and subscriber list from CNHI in April 2012. Gin Creek Publishing is owned by businessman Jim Cegielski, who is also the Leader-Call's publisher.

== History ==
For a century Laurel's only daily newspaper, the paper was founded as The Laurel Daily Argus August 11, 1911, by Edgar G. Harris. It later changed its name to the Laurel Daily Leader. The Laurel Morning Call and the Laurel Daily Leader combined to form an evening newspaper called The Laurel Leader-Call on February 2, 1930.

The paper was owned by Thomson Newspapers for several years. Thomson sold it in 1993 to American Publishing Company. American Publishing sold to Community Newspaper Holdings in 1999.

On September 1, 2011, the paper's owner, Community Newspaper Holdings Inc., announced that the Laurel Leader-Call would begin publishing on a four-day schedule: Tuesday, Wednesday, Thursday, and Sunday. The newspaper's website continued to provide news, features, sports, photos and video on a daily basis until it shut down nearly seven months later, along with the newspaper itself. CNHI folded the Leader-Call on March 29, 2012.

In April 2012 the Leader-Call name and subscriber list was purchased by Gin Creek Publishing, a local business that had published the weekly The ReView of Jones County since 2007. The ReView ceased operation and the Laurel Leader-Call was reborn as a three-day-a-week publication, beginning with the April 19, 2012, edition. New publisher-editor Mark Thornton said that "People who remember when the Leader-Call was family-owned remember that it was a much better paper then. We plan to restore that proud tradition."

Owner Jim Cegielski has used his platform at the Laurel Leader-Call to express both libertarian and right-wing viewpoints. In 2013, he earned praise for defending the Leader-Call's decision to feature a story and a photo of a lesbian couple's wedding in Laurel at a time when the State of Mississippi did not recognize same-sex marriages. Cegielski later became a vocal Donald Trump supporter, writing in a March 2020 op-ed that "mainstream media is the real virus" in reference to critical coverage of Trump's handling of COVID-19. In June 2020, Cegielski published another op-ed titled "The war against white people" which he claimed that Black Lives Matter protesters are part of "a group that is the equivalent of the KKK" and "openly hates white people."
