= Cities and counties in the United States offering a domestic partnership registry =

As of 2015, all 50 U.S. states and the District of Columbia legally recognize and document same-sex relationships in some fashion, be it by same-sex marriage, civil union or domestic partnerships. Many counties and municipalities outside of these states also provide domestic partnership registries or civil unions which are not officially recognized by the laws of their states, are only valid and applicable within those counties, and are usually largely unaffected by state law regarding relationship recognition (except in some aspects). In addition, many cities and counties continue to provide their own domestic partnership registries while their states also provide larger registries (for all relationship recognitions); a couple can only maintain registration on one registry, requiring the couple to de-register from the state registry before registering with the county registry.

These are the cities and counties of United States which offer a domestic partnership and/or civil union classified by census region.

== West Region ==
Cities, boroughs, towns, townships, unincorporated areas, and villages that offers domestic partner benefits Counties, consolidated city-counties, boroughs, parishes, and independent cities that offers domestic partner benefits State-wide partner benefits through same-sex marriage, civil unions, domestic partnership, designated beneficiary agreements, or reciprocal beneficiary relationships State-wide partner benefits through same-sex marriage, civil unions, domestic partnership, designated beneficiary agreements, or reciprocal beneficiary relationships, including state-wide domestic partnership benefits for state employees^{1}

=== Pacific Division ===
==== Hawaii ====
Same-sex marriages, civil unions, domestic partnerships (limited to state employees only) and reciprocal beneficiary relationships are all granted throughout the state to same-sex couples.

==== Alaska ====
Same-sex marriages and domestic partnerships (limited to state employees only) are both granted throughout the state to same-sex couples.

- City and Borough of Juneau

==== Washington State ====
Same-sex marriages are granted throughout the state to same-sex couples and all previous domestic partnerships (with the exception of couples with at least one member aged 62 or above) have automatically been converted into civil marriage.

- City of Anacortes
- City of Bellevue
- City of Bellingham
- City of Burien
- City of Des Moines
- City of Edmonds
- King County
- City of Lacey: Residents of the city. Both opposite- and same-sex couples.
- City of Newcastle
- City of Olympia: No residency requirement. Both opposite- and same-sex couples. Notarized applications are accepted by mail when accompanied by appropriate payment.
- Pierce County
- City of Seattle: No residency requirement. Both opposite- and same-sex couples. Notarized applications are accepted by mail when accompanied by appropriate payment.
- Snohomish County
- City of Spokane
- City of Tacoma
- City of Tumwater: Residents of the city. Both opposite- and same-sex couples.
- City of Vancouver

==== Oregon ====
Same-sex marriages and domestic partnerships are both granted throughout the state to same-sex couples.

- City of Ashland: No residency requirement. Limited to same-sex couples.
- City of Corvallis
- City of Eugene: No residency requirement. Both opposite-sex and same-sex couples.
- City of Gresham: Limited to same-sex couples.
- Multnomah County: No residency requirement. Both partners must be present. Both opposite-sex and same-sex couples.
- City of Portland

==== California ====
Same-sex marriage and domestic partnerships are both granted throughout the state to same-sex couples.

- Alameda County
- City of Berkeley: No residency requirement. Both opposite- and same-sex couples.
- City of Beverly Hills: No residency requirement. Both opposite- and same-sex couples.
- City of Cathedral City: Residents of the city. Both opposite- and same-sex couples.
- City of Claremont
- City of Davis: Residents of the city. Both opposite- and same-sex couples.
- City of Fremont
- City of Healdsburg
- City of Laguna Beach: No residency requirement. Both opposite- and same-sex couples.
- City of Long Beach: No residency requirement. Both opposite- and same-sex couples. Benefits include visitation rights in hospitals and correctional facilities equal to those given to a spouse.
- Los Angeles County : Residents of the county or at least one partner employed by the county. Both opposite- and same-sex couples.
- Marin County: Residents of the county or at least one partner employed in the county. Limited to same-sex couples.
- City of Modesto
- City of Oakland: Residents of the city or at least one partner employed by the city. Both opposite- and same-sex couples.
- City of Palm Springs: Residents of the city. Both opposite- and same-sex couples.
- City of Palo Alto: No residency requirement. Both opposite- and same-sex couples.
- City of Petaluma: Residents of the city or at least one partner employed in the city. Both opposite- and same-sex couples.
- City of Sacramento: Residents of the city. Both opposite- and same-sex couples.
- City of San Bruno
- City of San Diego
- City and County of San Francisco: Both partners residents of The City or at least one partner employed by City government. Both opposite- and same-sex couples.
- City of Santa Barbara: No residency requirement. Both opposite- and same-sex couples.
- Santa Barbara County : Residents of the county or at least one partner employed in the county. Both opposite- and same-sex couples.
- City of San Jose
- City of San Luis Obispo
- San Mateo County
- City of Santa Monica: No residency requirement. Both opposite- and same-sex couples.
- City of Santa Barbara
- City of Santa Cruz
- Santa Cruz County
- City of Santa Rosa
- City of Sebastopol
- Sonoma County
- Ventura County : Residents of the county or at least one partner employed by the county. Both opposite- and same-sex couples.
- City of West Hollywood: No residency requirement. Both opposite- and same-sex couples. Notarized applications are accepted by mail when accompanied by appropriate payment.

=== Mountain Division ===
==== Idaho ====
Same-sex marriages are granted throughout the state to same-sex couples.

==== Montana ====
Same-sex marriages and domestic partnerships (limited to state employees only) are both granted throughout the state to same-sex couples.

- City of Missoula: Residents of the city. Both opposite- and same-sex couples.
- Missoula County

==== Wyoming ====
Same-sex marriage are granted throughout the state to same-sex couples.

==== Nevada ====
Same-sex marriages and domestic partnerships are both granted throughout the state to same-sex couples.

==== Utah ====
Same-sex marriages are granted throughout the state to same-sex couples.

- City of Salt Lake : The Mutual Commitment Registry is open to city residents.
- Salt Lake County : The Mutual Commitment Registry is open to city residents.

==== Colorado ====
Same-sex marriages, civil unions and designated beneficiary agreements are all granted throughout the state to same-sex couples.

- City of Aspen
- City of Boulder: No residency requirement. Both opposite- and same-sex couples.
- City of Denver: No residency requirement. Both opposite- and same-sex couples.
- Eagle County
- City of Glendale

==== Arizona ====
Same-sex marriages and domestic partnerships (limited to state employees only) are both granted throughout the state to same-sex couples.

- City of Bisbee
- Town of Clarkdale
- City of Cottonwood
- City of Flagstaff : Must be resident of Flagstaff
- Town of Jerome
- City of Phoenix: Must be resident of Phoenix. Both opposite- and same-sex couples.
- Pima County
- City of Scottsdale
- City of Sedona
- City of Tempe : Both opposite- and same-sex couples.
- City of Tucson : No residency requirement. Both opposite- and same-sex couples.

==== New Mexico ====
Same-sex marriages and domestic partnerships (limited to state employees only) are both granted throughout the state to same-sex couples.

- City of Albuquerque: Both opposite- and same-sex couples.
- City of Santa Fe: Both opposite- and same-sex couples.

== Midwest Region ==
=== West North Central Division ===
==== North Dakota ====
Same-sex marriages are granted throughout the state to same-sex couples.

==== South Dakota ====
Same-sex marriages are granted throughout the state to same-sex couples.

==== Minnesota ====
Same-sex marriages are granted throughout the state to same-sex couples.

- City of Crystal: At least one partner must reside or work in the city. Both opposite- and same-sex couples.
- City of Duluth: No residency requirement. Both opposite- and same-sex couples.
- City of Eagan: Residents of the city. Both opposite- and same-sex couples.
- City of Eden Prairie: Must work or live in Eden Prairie, Minn. Both opposite- and same-sex couples.
- City of Edina: Must work or live in Edina, Minn. Both opposite- and same-sex couples.
- City of Falcon Heights: At least one partner must reside or work in the city. Both opposite- and same-sex couples.
- City of Golden Valley: Residents of the city. Both opposite- and same-sex couples.
- City of Maplewood
- City of Minneapolis: No residency requirement. Both opposite- and same-sex couples.
- City of Northfield
- City of Red Wing: At least one partner must reside or work in the city. Both opposite- and same-sex couples.
- City of Richfield: At least one partner must live or work in Richfield. Both opposite- and same-sex couples.
- City of Robbinsdale: Residents of the city. Both opposite- and same-sex couples.
- City of Rochester: No residency requirement. Both opposite- and same-sex couples.
- City of Saint Paul: No residency requirement. Both opposite- and same-sex couples.
- City of Shorewood
- City of St. Louis Park: At least one partner must reside or work in the city. Both opposite- and same-sex couples.

==== Nebraska ====
Same-sex marriages are granted throughout the state to same-sex couples.

==== Iowa ====
Same-sex marriages and domestic partnerships (limited to state employees only) are both granted throughout the entire state to same-sex couples.

- Floyd County: Employees of the county. Both opposite- and same-sex couples.
- City of Iowa City: No residency requirement. Both opposite- and same-sex couples.

==== Kansas ====
Same-sex marriages are granted throughout the entire state to same-sex couples.

- City of Lawrence: Both individuals must be residents of the City of Lawrence, Kansas. Both opposite- and same-sex couples.
- City of Topeka: Both be residents of the city of Topeka. Share a common permanent residence. Agree to be in a relationship of mutual interdependence. Each be at least 18 years old and mentally competent to enter into a contract. Not be related by blood as defined by Kansas law. Agree to file a Declaration of Domestic Partnership with the city of Topeka.

==== Missouri ====
Same-sex marriages are granted throughout the entire state to same-sex couples.

- City of Clayton: Residents of the city. Both opposite- and same-sex couples.
- City of Columbia: No residency requirement. Both opposite- and same-sex couples.
- Jackson County: Residents of the city. Both opposite- and same-sex couples.
- City of Kansas City: Residents of the city. Both opposite- and same-sex couples.
- City of Olivette: No residency requirement. Both opposite- and same-sex couples.
- City of St. Louis: Residents of the city. Both opposite- and same-sex couples.
- University City: Residents of the city. Both opposite- and same-sex couples.

=== East North Central Division ===
==== Wisconsin ====
Same-sex marriages are granted throughout the entire state to same-sex couples.

- City of Appleton
- Dane County: Residents of the county. Both opposite- and same-sex couples.
- City of Eau Claire: City employees only. Both opposite- and same-sex couples.
- City of Janesville
- Kenosha County : Residents of the county. Both opposite- and same-sex couples.
- City of Madison: Residents of the city. Both opposite- and same-sex couples.
- City of Manitowoc
- City of Milwaukee: Residents in Milwaukee County. Limited to same-sex couples.
- Milwaukee County
- City of Racine: City employees only. Only applies to state-registered domestic partners, which are defined by state law as same-sex couples.
- Rock County : Residents of the county. Both opposite- and same-sex couples.
- Village of Shorewood Hills

==== Michigan ====
Same-sex marriages are granted throughout the entire state to same-sex couples.

- City of Ann Arbor: No residency requirement. Both opposite- and same-sex couples. Notarized applications are accepted by mail when accompanied by appropriate payment.
- City of Detroit: No residency requirement. Both opposite- and same-sex couples.
- City of East Lansing
- Ingham County
- City of Kalamazoo: Both opposite- and same-sex couples.
- Washtenaw County: Both opposite- and same-sex couples.
- Wayne County: Both opposite- and same-sex couples.

==== Illinois ====
Same-sex marriage, civil unions and domestic partnerships (limited to state employees only) are all granted throughout the entire state to same-sex couples.

- City of Champaign
- Champaign County: Employees of the county.
- City of Chicago: Limited to same-sex couples.
- Cook County: Limited to same-sex couples.
- Village of Oak Park: Residents of the city. Limited to same-sex couples.
- City of Urbana: No residency requirement. Both opposite- and same-sex couples.

==== Indiana ====
Same-sex marriages are granted throughout the entire state to same-sex couples.

- City of Bloomington: No residency requirement. Both opposite- and same-sex couples.
- City of Carmel: No residency requirement. Both opposite- and same-sex couples.
- City of Indianapolis: No residency requirement. Both opposite- and same-sex couples.

==== Ohio ====
Same-sex marriages are granted throughout the entire state to same-sex couples.

- City of Athens: No residency requirement. Both opposite- and same-sex couples.
- City of Cincinnati: Employees of the city. Both opposite- and same-sex couples.
- City of Cleveland: No residency requirement. Both opposite- and same-sex couples.
- City of Cleveland Heights: No residency requirement. Both opposite- and same-sex couples.
- City of Columbus: No residency requirement. Both opposite- and same-sex couples.
- Cuyahoga County: At least one partner must be employed by the county. Same-sex couples only.
- City of Dayton: No residency requirement. Both opposite- and same-sex couples.
- Franklin County
- City of Lakewood
- City of Oberlin
- City of Toledo: No residency requirement. Both opposite- and same-sex couples.
- Village of Yellow Springs: No residency requirement. Both opposite- and same-sex couples.

== North-East Region ==
=== New England Division ===
==== Vermont ====
Same-sex marriages and domestic partnerships (limited to state employees only) are both granted throughout the entire state to same-sex couples.

- City of Burlington
- Town of Middlebury

==== Rhode Island ====
Same-sex marriages and domestic partnerships (limited to state employees only) are both granted throughout the entire state to same-sex couples and all previous civil unions were automatically converted into same sex marriages.

- City of Providence

==== New Hampshire ====
Same-sex marriages are granted throughout the entire state to same-sex couples and all previous civil unions were automatically converted into same sex marriages.

- Town of Northwood
- Unincorporated community of West Lebanon

==== Maine ====
Same-sex marriages and domestic partnerships are both granted throughout the entire state to same-sex couples.

- City of Falmouth
- City of Portland: Residents of the city. Benefits include the visitation rights at city health facilities equal to those given to a spouse. Same-sex couples only.

==== Massachusetts ====
Same-sex marriages and domestic partnerships (limited state employees only) are both granted throughout the entire state to same-sex couples.

- City of Boston: No residency requirement. Both opposite- and same-sex couples.
- Town of Brewster: No residency requirement. Both opposite- and same-sex couples.
- Town of Brookline: No residency requirement. Limited to same-sex couples.
- City of Cambridge: No residency requirement. Both opposite- and same-sex couples. Benefits include visitation rights in hospitals and correctional facilities equal to those given to a spouse. A domestic partner, who is also the parent or legal guardian of a child, may file a form at or send a letter to the child's school to indicate that the parent's domestic partner shall have access to the child's records.
- Town of Nantucket: No residency requirement. Open to opposite- and same-sex couples.
- Town of Provincetown: No residency requirement for registrants. Both opposite- and same-sex couples. Benefits include visitation rights in hospitals and correctional facilities equal to those given to a spouse. A domestic partner, who is also the parent or legal guardian of a child, may file a form at or send a letter to the child's school to indicate that the parent's domestic partner shall have access to the child's records.

==== Connecticut ====
Same-sex marriages and domestic partnerships (limited to state employees only) are both granted throughout the entire state to same-sex couples and all previous civil unions were automatically converted into same sex marriages.

- City of Hartford: No residency requirement. Both opposite- and same-sex couples.
- City of Mansfield

=== Middle Atlantic Division ===
==== New York State ====
Same-sex marriages and domestic partnerships (limited to state employees only) are both granted throughout the entire state to same-sex couples.

- City of Albany: No residency requirement. Both opposite- and same-sex couples.name
- Albany County
- Town of Babylon: Residents of the town. Both opposite- and same-sex couples.
- Town of East Hampton: Both opposite-sex and same-sex couples.
- Village of Great Neck: Both opposite- and same-sex couples.
- Village of Great Neck Plaza: Both partners must be residents of the village, or at least one partner must be employed by the village. Both opposite- and same-sex couples.
- Township of Grennburgh
- Town of Huntington: Residents of the town. Both opposite- and same-sex couples.
- City of Ithaca: No residency requirement. Both opposite-sex and same-sex couples.
- Town of Ithaca: Residents of the town or at least one partner employed by the town. Both opposite- and same-sex couples.
- Nassau County
- City of New Rochelle
- City of New York: Residents of the city or at least one partner employed by the city. Both opposite- and same-sex couples.
- Town of North Hempstead: Both partners must be residents of the town, or at least one partner must be employed by the town. Both opposite- and same-sex couples.
- Village of North Hills
- City of Rochester: No residency requirement. Both opposite- and same-sex couples.
- Rockland County: Residents of the county or at least one partner employed by the county government. Both opposite- and same-sex couples.
- Village of Roslyn Estates: Both partners must be residents of the village, or at least one partner must be employed by the village. Both opposite- and same-sex couples.
- Town of Southampton: Residents of the town. Both opposite-sex and same-sex couples.
- Town of Southold: At least one partner must be a resident of the town. Both opposite- and same-sex couples.
- Suffolk County: Residents of the county or at least one partner employed by the county. Both opposite- and same-sex couples.
- Westchester County: No residency requirement. Both opposite- and same-sex couples.

==== Pennsylvania ====
Same-sex marriages are granted throughout the entire state to same-sex couples.

- City of Allentown: At least one partner must work or have worked for the city. Same-sex couples only.
- City of Harrisburg: Both opposite- and same-sex couples may register as "Life Partners" with the City of Harrisburg's Life Partnership Registry.
- Luzerne County: Same-sex couples only.
- City and County of Philadelphia: Residents of the city or at least one partner employed by the city. Both opposite- and same-sex couples.
- City of Pittsburgh: No residency requirement. Limited to same-sex couples.
- Borough of State College: No residency requirement. Both opposite- and same-sex couples.

==== New Jersey ====
Same-sex marriages, civil unions, and domestic partnerships are all granted throughout the entire state to same-sex couples.

- Bergen County
- Township of Berkeley
- Township of Brick
- Camden County
- Gloucester County
- Township of Haddon
- Hudson County
- Township of Jackson
- City of Jersey
- Township of Maplewood
- Mercer County
- Monmouth County
- Morris County
- Township of Mount Holly
- Township of Mount Laurel
- Ocean County
- Passaic County
- City of Plainfield
- Borough of Princeton
- Township of South Orange
- Borough of Stone Harbor
- Borough of Stratford
- Union County
- Borough of Westville

== South Region ==
=== West South Central Division ===
==== Oklahoma ====
Same-sex marriages are granted throughout the entire state to same-sex couples.

==== Texas ====
Same-sex marriages are granted throughout the entire state to same-sex couples.

- City of Austin: Employees of the city. Both opposite- and same-sex couples.
- Bexar County: Employees of the city. Both opposite- and same-sex couples.
- City of Dallas: Employees of the city. Both opposite- and same-sex couples.
- Dallas County: Employees of the county. Both opposite- and same-sex couples.
- City of El Paso: At least one partner must be employed by the city. Both opposite- and same-sex couples.
- El Paso County: Employees of the city. Both opposite- and same-sex couples.
- City of Fort Worth: Employees of the city. Both opposite- and same-sex couples.
- City of Houston: Employees of the city. Both opposite- and same-sex married couples.
- City of San Antonio: At least one partner must be employed by the city. Both opposite- and same-sex couples.
- Travis County: No residency requirement. Both opposite- and same-sex couples.

==== Arkansas ====
Same-sex marriages are granted throughout the entire state to same-sex couples.

- City of Eureka Springs: No residency requirement. Both opposite- and same-sex couples.

==== Louisiana ====
Same-sex marriages are granted throughout the entire state to same-sex couples.

- City and Parish of New Orleans: Residents of the city or at least one partner employed in the city. Both opposite- and same-sex couples.

=== East South Central Division ===
==== Kentucky ====
Same-sex marriages are granted throughout the entire state to same-sex couples.

- City of Berea: Employees of the city. Both opposite- and same-sex couples.
- City of Covington: Employees of the city. Both opposite- and same-sex couples.
- City and County of Lexington: Employees of the city. Both opposite- and same-sex couples.
- City and County of Louisville: Employees of the city. Both opposite- and same-sex couples.

==== Tennessee ====
Same-sex marriages are granted throughout the entire state to same-sex couples.

- City of Chattanooga: Employees of the city. Both opposite- and same-sex couples.
- City of Collegedale: Employees of the city. Both opposite- and same-sex couples.
- City of Knoxville: Employees of the city. Both opposite- and same-sex couples.
- City-County Government of Nashville-Davidson County: Employees of the city-county government. Both opposite- and same-sex couples.

==== Mississippi ====
Same-sex marriages are granted throughout the entire state to same-sex couples.

==== Alabama ====
Same-sex marriages are granted throughout the entire state to same-sex couples.

=== South Atlantic Division ===
==== Delaware ====
Same-sex marriages and domestic partnerships (limited to state employees only) are both granted throughout the entire state to same-sex couples. All previous civil unions have been automatically converted into civil marriages.

==== Maryland ====
Same-sex marriages and domestic partnerships are both granted throughout the entire state to same-sex couples.

- City of Baltimore
- City of College Park
- City of Greenbelt
- Howard County
- City of Hyattsville
- Montgomery County: Both opposite- and same-sex couples.
- City of Mount Rainier
- City of Takoma Park: No residency requirement. Both opposite- and same-sex couples.

==== Washington, DC ====
Same-sex marriages and domestic partnerships are both granted in the entire district to same-sex couples.

==== West Virginia ====
Same-sex marriages are granted throughout the entire state to same-sex couples.

==== Virginia ====
Same-sex marriages are granted throughout the entire state to same-sex couples.

==== North Carolina ====
Same-sex marriages are granted throughout the entire state to same-sex couples.

- City of Asheville: No residency requirement, same-sex couples only.
- Buncombe County: Employees of the county.
- Town of Carrboro: Residents of the town or at least one partner employed by the town. Both opposite- and same-sex couples.
- Town of Chapel Hill: No residency requirement. Both opposite- and same-sex couples.
- City of Charlotte
- City of Durham
- Durham County: Employees of the county. Same-sex couples only.
- City of Greensboro
- Mecklenburg County: Employees of the county. Same-sex couples only.
- Orange County

==== South Carolina ====
Same-sex marriages are granted throughout the entire state to same-sex couples.

==== Georgia ====
Same-sex marriages are granted throughout the entire state to same-sex couples.

- Athens-Clarke County: Residents of the county or at least one partner employed by the county. Both opposite- and same-sex couples.
- City of Atlanta: Residents of the city. Both opposite- and same-sex couples.
- City of Avondale Estates
- City of Clarkston: Residents of the city. Both opposite- and same-sex couples.
- City of Decatur: Residents of the city. Both opposite- and same-sex couples.
- DeKalb County
- City of Doraville
- City of East Point: Limited to same-sex couples.
- Fulton County: Residents of the county or at least one partner employed by the county. Limited to same-sex couples.
- City of Savannah: Health care benefits for city employees.
- City of Pine Lake

==== Florida ====
Same-sex marriages are granted throughout the entire state to same-sex couples.

- City of Bay Harbor Islands
- Broward County: Residents of the county or at least one partner employed by the county. Both opposite- and same-sex couples.
- City of Cape Coral: No residency requirement. Both opposite- and same-sex couples.
- City of Clearwater: No residency requirement. Both opposite- and same-sex couples.
- City of Delray Beach
- City of Gainesville: No residency requirement. Both opposite- and same-sex couples.
- City of Hialeah
- Hillsborough County
- City of Juno Beach
- City of Jupiter
- City of Key West: No residency requirement. Both opposite- and same-sex couples.
- City of Kissimmee: Employees of the city. Both opposite- and same-sex couples.
- City of Lake Worth
- Leon County: No residency requirement. Both opposite- and same-sex couples.
- City of Margate: No residency requirement. Both opposite- and same-sex couples.
- City of Miami: Residents of the county or at least one partner employed by the county. Both opposite- and same-sex couples.
- City of Miami Beach: No residency requirement. Both opposite- and same-sex couples.
- Miami-Dade County: Residents of the county or at least one partner employed by the county. Both opposite- and same-sex couples.
- City of Miramar
- Monroe County: No residency requirement. Both opposite- and same-sex couples. County employment benefits only.
- City of North Miami
- Orange County: No residency requirement. Both opposite- and same-sex couples.
- City of Orlando: No residency requirement. Both opposite- and same-sex couples.
- Town of Palm Beach
- Palm Beach County: Residents of the county or at least one partner employed by the county. Both opposite- and same-sex couples.
- City of Pembroke Pines
- City of Pensacola: Both opposite- and same-sex couples.
- Pinellas County: Both opposite- and same-sex couples.
- City of Punta Gorda: Both opposite- and same-sex couples.
- City of Sarasota: No residency requirement. Both opposite- and same-sex couples. City employment benefits only.
- Sarasota County: Both opposite- and same-sex couples.
- South Miami: Residents of the county or at least one partner employed by the county. Both opposite- and same-sex couples.
- City of St. Cloud: Employees of the city. Both opposite- and same-sex couples.
- City of St. Petersburg: No residency requirement. Both opposite- and same-sex couples.
- City of Tallahassee
- City of Tampa: No residency requirement. Both opposite- and same-sex couples.
- City of Tavares: No residency requirement. Both opposite- and same-sex couples.
- City of Tequesta
- Volusia County: No residency requirement. Both opposite- and same-sex couples.
- City of West Palm Beach: No residency requirement. Both opposite- and same-sex couples.
- City of Wilton Manors
