= LGBTQ rights in South Dakota =

- South Dakota (US)
- Legal status: Legal since 1976
- Gender identity: Since 2026, changing sex on a birth certificate is banned for transgender individuals
- Discrimination protections: Protections for sexual orientation and gender identity in employment

Family rights
- Recognition of relationships: Same-sex marriage since 2015
- Adoption: Same-sex couples allowed to adopt

Lesbian, gay, bisexual, transgender, and queer (LGBTQ) people in the U.S. state of South Dakota may face some legal challenges not experienced by non-LGBTQ residents. Same-sex sexual activity is legal in South Dakota, and same-sex marriages have been recognized since June 2015 as a result of Obergefell v. Hodges. State statutes do not address discrimination on account of sexual orientation or gender identity; however, the U.S. Supreme Court's ruling in Bostock v. Clayton County established that employment discrimination against LGBTQ people is illegal under federal law.

In 2024, The Transformation Project, a transgender rights organisation, sued the state of South Dakota over a discrimination case and won the lawsuit.

== Law regarding same-sex sexual activity ==
Prior to European settlement in the 18th and 19th centuries, there were no known legal or social punishments for engaging in homosexual activity. Perceptions toward gender and sexuality among the Native Americans were different to that of the Western world. Several had traditions of "third gender" people (nowadays also called "two-spirit") who would dress and act as the opposite gender, perform tasks associated with the opposite gender and be fully recognized as such by the members of the tribe. Among the Dakota people, male-bodied people who act as female are known as winkta, and as wíŋkte (pronounced [ˈwɪ̃ktɛ]) among the Lakota people.

In 1862, the Dakota Territory, which included modern-day North and South Dakota, enacted a criminal ban on heterosexual and homosexual sodomy, which was defined as "crimes against nature". The ban prohibited anal intercourse, regardless of whether the act was committed in private and consensual. Punishment could vary from one year in jail to life imprisonment. In 1877, the maximum penalty was reduced to ten years' imprisonment. In 1910, the definition of sodomy was expanded to include fellatio after State v. Whitmarsh.

In 1976, private, adult, consensual and non-commercial acts of sodomy were legalized with an age of consent set at thirteen years. The age of consent was later raised to fifteen years.

== Recognition of same-sex relationships ==
South Dakota voters adopted a constitutional amendment in November 2006 that defines marriage as the union of a man and a woman and prohibited the recognition of same-sex relationships under any other name, such as civil unions and domestic partnership agreements. Similar restrictions appear in the state statutes as well.

On June 26, 2015, same-sex marriage became legal in the state of South Dakota and all of the United States due to the Supreme Court ruling of Obergefell v. Hodges.

=== Rosenbrahn v. Daugaard ===
On May 22, 2014, six same-sex couples filed a federal lawsuit against South Dakota officials seeking the right to marry and recognition of marriages performed in other jurisdictions. The suit, Rosenbrahn v. Daugaard, was brought by Minneapolis civil rights attorney Joshua A. Newville, who filed a similar lawsuit on behalf of seven same-sex couples in North Dakota on June 6, 2014. U.S. District Court Judge Karen Schreier heard arguments on October 17. The state defendants argued she was bound by the Eighth Circuit's decision in Citizens for Equal Protection v. Bruning (2006), which the plaintiffs said did not address the questions they were raising in this case. On November 12, Judge Schreier denied the defense's motion to dismiss. She found Baker is no longer valid precedent and that Bruning did not address due process or the question of a fundamental right to marry. She dismissed the plaintiffs' claim that South Dakota violated their right to travel. On January 12, 2015, she ruled for the plaintiffs, finding that South Dakota was depriving them of their "fundamental right to marry". She stayed implementation of her ruling pending appeal. On February 10, the plaintiffs asked her to lift the stay, citing the U.S. Supreme Court's denial of a stay in Alabama cases the previous day. Two days later, they requested an expedited response to that request.

Following the decision of the U.S. Supreme Court in Obergefell v. Hodges on June 26, 2015, which held that the denial of marriage rights to same-sex couples is unconstitutional, the state defendants asked the Eighth Circuit to vacate the district court decision and dismiss the case as moot. The plaintiffs on July 1 opposed that request, citing statements by the Attorney General that county officials were responsible individually for interpreting Obergefell. They asked the Eighth Circuit to order the district court to lift its stay. On June 26, Attorney General Marty Jackley said that: "Because we are a nation of laws the state will be required to follow the Court's order that every state must recognize and license same-sex marriage." But some reports said he indicated that local officials would determine whether or how soon to issue marriage licenses to same-sex couples.

== Adoption and parenting ==
South Dakota does not specify laws about adoption by single individuals and married same-sex couples. Lesbian couples have access to assisted reproduction services, such as in vitro fertilization. State law recognizes the non-genetic, non-gestational mother as a legal parent to a child born via donor insemination, but the parents are required to be married. Male gay couples may also undertake gestational and traditional surrogacy arrangements. Courts may declare both intended parents as the legal parents of the child in a pre-birth order.

South Dakota law permits adoption agencies to choose not to place children in certain homes if it would violate the agency's religious or moral convictions. This law, known as S.J. 746, passed into law in May 2017.

== Discrimination protections ==
Map of South Dakota counties and cities that had sexual orientation and/or gender identity anti–employment discrimination ordinances prior to Bostock Sexual orientation and gender identity in public and private employment Sexual orientation and gender identity solely in public employment Sexual orientation in public employment Does not protect sexual orientation and gender identity in employment

No provision of South Dakota law explicitly addresses discrimination on the basis of sexual orientation or gender identity.

The county of Oglala Lakota, and the cities of Sioux Falls, and Vermillion prohibit discrimination against county/city employees on the basis of sexual orientation and gender identity. Others including Minnehaha County, Spearfish and Watertown prohibit discrimination against county/city employees on the basis of sexual orientation only.

In March 2018, the city of Brookings became the first jurisdiction in South Dakota to enact a comprehensive anti-discrimination ordinance covering sexual orientation and gender identity, banning discrimination against public and private employees, in housing and in public accommodations (such as restaurants, etc.).

In March 2021, Governor Kristi Noem signed a bill into law allowing businesses to deny goods or services to LGBTQ people and others based on the owners' "purported religious beliefs".

=== Bostock v. Clayton County ===
On June 15, 2020, the U.S. Supreme Court ruled in Bostock v. Clayton County, consolidated with Altitude Express, Inc. v. Zarda, and in R.G. & G.R. Harris Funeral Homes Inc. v. Equal Employment Opportunity Commission that discrimination in the workplace on the basis of sexual orientation or gender identity is discrimination on the basis of sex, and Title VII therefore protects LGBT employees from discrimination.

== Hate crime law ==
South Dakota law does not address hate crimes based on gender identity or sexual orientation. However, federal law has covered both categories since 2009, when the Matthew Shepard and James Byrd Jr. Hate Crimes Prevention Act was signed into law by President Barack Obama. Hate crimes committed on the basis of the victim's sexual orientation or gender identity can thus be prosecuted in federal court.

In September 2019, the Oglala Sioux Tribal Council passed hate crime legislation which protects LGBT and two-spirit individuals, with 14 votes in favor, 2 against and 1 abstention.

== Transgender rights ==
=== Identity documents ===
In March 2026, the Supreme Court of South Dakota made a ruling that bans transgender individuals from changing or altering their sex on a birth certificate - unless an error was made during birth.

South Dakota allows transgender people to change their legal gender. In order to update a birth certificate, the applicant must submit to the Office of Vital Records a copy of a court order changing their legal name and gender, a copy of the photo ID, an "Application for Birth Record" as well as pay the required fee. The Department of Public Safety will change the gender marker on a driver's license and state ID card upon receipt of a court order certifying the gender change or a signed affidavit from a licensed physician confirming sex reassignment surgery.

=== Gender-affirming care for minors ===
In 2023, South Dakota House Bill 1080 (HB 1080), also referred to as the Help Not Harm Bill, was passed. HB 1080 restricts medical professionals in South Dakota from administering most forms of gender-affirming care to South Dakotans under eighteen years of age. It restricts access to gender-affirming medical care for minors, namely hormone replacement therapy (HRT), puberty blockers, and sex reassignment surgery. Exceptions to the law exist for those with developmental disorders, those with non-congruent sex chromosome structures, or due to an injury or disease such as premature menopause. South Dakotans who were already receiving gender-affirming care prior to July 1, 2023 were included in a grandfather clause, but were required to end treatment by December 31, 2023. Medical professionals face discipline if they violate HB 1080. The law allows adults to sue their healthcare providers for "injury or damages" caused by receiving gender-affirming care as minors. People can file such lawsuits until age 25, or (if they're over 25) "within three years" of becoming aware that their healthcare professional's "violation" caused "injury or damages".

Governor Kristi Noem supported HB 1080 prior to its passage. The primary author of the bill, Bethany Soye, stated that gender-affirming medical care was "mutilation" and "experimental". HB 1080 was opposed by the South Dakota State Medical Association after its introduction, along with several medical professionals. The Human Rights Campaign condemned the law. The American Civil Liberties Union opposed HB 1080 and had considered a lawsuit against it.

Three years earlier, on February 10, 2020, a state senate committee had voted down similar legislative proposals, including one that would have criminalized physicians for prescribing hormones and hormone blockers or for performing surgery (unless they were trying to fit an intersex child into the gender binary), and another that would not have made physicians' involvement a crime but would have allowed their patients to sue them if they later felt regret. The committee voted not to pursue it. At that time, similar legislative efforts were underway in Florida, South Carolina, Colorado, Oklahoma and Missouri.

=== Recognition of students' gender ===
In March 2016, Governor Dennis Daugaard vetoed a bill that would have required transgender students to use bathrooms and locker rooms that match their birth sex.

On 12 February 2019, the House passed legislation (known as HB 1108) which would have barred public schools up to grade K-7 (12-13 years old) from instructing students on gender identity and expression. However, the bill failed to pass the Senate before it adjourned sine die on March 29, 2019. Human Rights Campaign reported that the "bill would prevent teachers from being able to acknowledge the transgender identity of people they are teaching about as well as prevent them from being able to support students who identify as transgender."

=== Sports ===
In March 2021, legislation banning transgender athletes from participating in school sports and athletic teams passed the South Dakota Legislature. Similar laws also passed in Mississippi and Idaho. On March 19, Governor Kristi Noem refused to sign the bill into law, opposing portions of the bill that would ban transgender athletes from competing in college sports, worrying such a ban would cause collegiate sporting organizations, such as the National Collegiate Athletic Association, to avoid holding games and tournaments in the state. The Governor did however sign an executive order on banning transgender individuals within female sports. The ACLU has threatened a lawsuit in federal court.

In January 2022, another similar "anti-transgender sports bill" was introduced and passed the South Dakota Senate and is awaiting a vote in the South Dakota House of Representatives. In February 2022, a bill went to the Governor's desk and could be either signed into law or vetoed and also a couple of other bills are still awaiting votes within the legislature. An anti-trans lawmaker went so far as to call transgender individuals "terrorists", which caused immediate outrage.

On February 4, 2022 the Governor signed the bill into law - becomes effective July 1, 2022. 10 US states have similar laws or regulations that legally ban transgender individuals from playing sports, athletics and Olympics within South Dakota.

== Public opinion ==
A 2022 Public Religion Research Institute (PRRI) opinion poll found that 63% of South Dakota residents supported same-sex marriage, while 37% opposed it and 1% were unsure. The same poll also found that 67% of South Dakota residents supported an anti-discrimination law covering sexual orientation and gender identity, while 32% were opposed. Additionally, 62% were against allowing businesses to refuse to serve gay and lesbian people due to religious beliefs, while 38% supported allowing such religiously-based refusals.

Public opinion for LGBTQ anti-discrimination laws in South Dakota
Poll source	Date(s) administered	Sample size	Margin of error	% support	% opposition	% no opinion
Public Religion Research Institute	January 2-December 30, 2019	157	?	68%	24%	8%
Public Religion Research Institute	January 3-December 30, 2018	184	?	66%	27%	7%
Public Religion Research Institute	April 5-December 23, 2017	259	?	62%	28%	10%
Public Religion Research Institute	April 29, 2015-January 7, 2016	278	?	67%	30%	3%

== Summary table ==
Same-sex sexual activity legal	Yes (Since 1976)
Equal age of consent	Yes (Since 1976)
Anti-discrimination laws in employment	Yes (Since 2020 under Bostock v. Clayton County)
Anti-discrimination laws in housing	No (The religious freedom laws block its enforcement)
Anti-discrimination laws in public accommodations	No (The religious freedom laws block its enforcement)
Anti-discrimination laws in health care	No (The religious freedom laws block its enforcement)
LGBT anti-bullying policy in schools and colleges	No (School districts forbidden from enumerating classes of protected children)
Same-sex marriages	Yes (Since 2015)
Stepchild and joint adoption by same-sex couples	Yes / No (Yes; agencies may deny adoption to same-sex couples for religious beliefs)
Lesbian, gay and bisexual people allowed to serve openly in the military	Yes (Since 2011)
Transgender people allowed to serve openly in the military	No (Banned since 2025)
Intersex people allowed to serve openly in the military	(Current DoD policy bans "hermaphrodites" from serving or enlisting in the military)
Right to change legal gender	No (Since 2026, under a ruling by the South Dakota Supreme Court)
Conversion therapy banned on minors	No
Access to IVF for lesbian couples	Yes
Surrogacy arrangements legal for gay male couples	Yes
MSMs allowed to donate blood	Yes (Since 2023, for monogamous gay and bi men)

== See also ==
- LGBT history in South Dakota
