= White Marsh =

White Marsh or Whitemarsh can refer to:

- White Marsh, Maryland, United States
- White Marsh, the location of Sacred Heart Church (Bowie, Maryland)
- Whitemarsh Township, Pennsylvania, United States
  - Battle of White Marsh, a Revolutionary War battle
- White Marsh, Virginia, a community in Gloucester County

== See also ==
- Whitmarsh, surname
