= LGBTQ history in South Dakota =

The history of LGBT residents in South Dakota spans back to precolonial Native American times, but has become much more visible in the 21st century.

== Pre-19th century ==
Two-Spirit people were celebrated in Lakota, Dakota, and Nakota cultures before European contact. They played influential and important roles and were commonly seen as spiritual leaders in their communities.

== 19th century ==
In 1862, Dakota Territory enacted laws against sodomy in regards to both heterosexual and homosexual acts, with a minimum punishment of one year of incarceration and a maximum of life in prison. This maximum penalty was decreased in 1877 to ten years. Upon the establishment of South Dakota from Dakota Territory, it kept these laws as they were written, unlike its neighbor North Dakota.

== 20th century ==
=== 1900–1949 ===
In 1903, the common-law definition of sodomy was abolished.

In 1910, after the State v. Whitmarsh court case, South Dakota's definition of sodomy was expanded to include fellatio. State v. Whitmarsh was the only sodomy case ever in South Dakota. Despite the fact that the court case dealt with pedophilia, the court ruled that all acts of fellatio were immoral and a "detestable and abominable crime against nature." The ruling was based solely on moral grounds.

=== 1950–1999 ===
In 1976, the criminal code of South Dakota was revised, and the definition of sodomy along with it. The revision upheld the abolition of common-law sodomy and abolished all other sodomy laws, implementing 13 as the age of consent. In 1978, the age of consent was raised to 15 years.

In Sioux Falls in 1979, Randy Rohl and Grady Quinn, then 17 and 20 respectively, became the first two openly gay people to attend a prom together in the United States.

In 1995, LGBT people and allies came forward to testify in front of the South Dakota State Senate for the first time in state history. The movement was due to House Bill 1184, which would have made same-sex marriage illegal in South Dakota and would not recognize unions made in other states.

== 21st century ==
=== 2000–2009 ===
In the 2006 election cycle, South Dakota adopted South Dakota Amendment C, a constitutional amendment that defined marriage as between a man and a woman and banned same-sex marriage, as well as similar arrangements, such as domestic partnerships and civil unions. This measure was ruled unconstitutional by the U.S. Supreme Court during Obergefell v. Hodges on June 26, 2015. In the summer of 2006, Equality South Dakota a statewide 501(c)(4) non-profit organization, was founded with support from the Gill Foundation.

=== 2010–present ===
In 2012, Angie Buhl became the first openly LGBT public official in South Dakota upon her coming out as bisexual. Buhl had been elected to South Dakota's legislature in 2011.

Shortly after same-sex marriage was legalized in the U.S. by Obergefell v. Hodges on June 26, 2015, the first same-sex marriage license in South Dakota was granted to Melissa Eidson and Misty Collins in Rapid City, who also became the first same-sex couple to marry in South Dakota later that day.

On January 12, 2016, South Dakota came into the public eye when Congress introduced House Bill 1008, which would have restricted bathroom and locker room use by transgender students to the ones that correlated with their sex assigned at birth, not their gender identity. The bill was passed in the House of Representatives on January 27 and by the Senate on February 16. The bill was subsequently vetoed by Governor Dennis Daugaard on March 2; a veto override failed the following day. Several LGBT and human rights organizations actively opposed the measure, including the American Civil Liberties Union, Human Rights Campaign, and the Gay, Lesbian and Straight Education Network.

South Dakota's first LGBT and Two Spirit resource center, the Prism Community Center, opened on October 23, 2023. Founded by the Transformation Project, the center functions as their headquarters and as a community space.

== See also ==
- LGBTQ rights in South Dakota
