= Same-sex marriage in South Dakota =

Same-sex marriage has been legal in South Dakota since June 26, 2015 when the U.S. Supreme Court ruled in Obergefell v. Hodges that the U.S. Constitution guarantees same-sex couples the right to marry. Attorney General Marty Jackley issued a statement critical of the ruling but said that the state would comply and recognize same-sex marriages. Prior to this, a lawsuit seeking to declare the ban unconstitutional, Rosenbrahn v. Daugaard, had been filed in the U.S. District Court for the District of South Dakota in May 2014. On January 12, 2015, Judge Karen Schreier ruled for the plaintiffs, finding that South Dakota was depriving them of their fundamental right to marry. The state appealed to the Eighth Circuit Court of Appeals, which suspended proceedings in April 2015 pending the outcome of Obergefell. Following the Supreme Court ruling, the Eighth Circuit affirmed the judgement of the district court.

Previously, South Dakota had restricted marriage to the "union of a man and a woman" both by statute and in its State Constitution. Polling suggests that a majority of South Dakota residents support the legal recognition of same-sex marriage. Despite this, a number of Republican politicians have continued to introduce motions urging the overturning of Obergefell.

== Legal restrictions ==
=== Statutes ===
While unenforceable, state statutes ban same-sex marriage. The ban was struck down by the U.S. Supreme Court in Obergefell v. Hodges on June 26, 2015. South Dakota's statutory prohibition on same-sex marriage, though unenforceable, remains on the books and has not been explicitly repealed. In 2023, Representative Linda Duba introduced a bill to officially repeal the statutory ban and define marriage as the union of "two persons". A House committee voted 5–7 to kill her bill on February 13, 2023.

=== Constitutional amendment ===
South Dakota voters adopted a constitutional amendment in November 2006 that defined marriage as the "union of a man and a woman" and prohibited the recognition of same-sex relationships under any other name, such as civil unions and domestic partnerships.

== Lawsuit ==
On May 22, 2014, six same-sex couples filed a lawsuit in federal district court against South Dakota officials seeking the right to marry and recognition of marriages performed in other jurisdictions. The suit, Rosenbrahn v. Daugaard, was brought by Minneapolis civil rights attorney Joshua A. Newville, who filed a similar lawsuit on behalf of seven same-sex couples in North Dakota on June 6, 2014. The suit named Governor Dennis Daugaard as the first-named defendant. U.S. District Court Judge Karen Schreier heard oral arguments on October 17. The state defendants argued she was bound by the Eighth Circuit's decision in Citizens for Equal Protection v. Bruning, which the plaintiffs said did not address the questions they were raising in this case. On November 12, Judge Schreier denied the defense's motion to dismiss. She found that Baker v. Nelson was no longer valid precedent and that Bruning did not address due process or the question of a fundamental right to marry. She dismissed the plaintiffs' claim that South Dakota violated their right to travel. On January 12, 2015, she ruled for the plaintiffs, finding that South Dakota was depriving them of their fundamental right to marry:

In Loving, the Supreme Court addressed a traditionally accepted definition of marriage that prohibited Mildred Jeter and Richard Loving from marrying. Because Virginia's laws deprived that couple of their fundamental right to marriage, the Court struck down those laws. Little distinguishes this case from Loving. Plaintiffs have a fundamental right to marry. South Dakota law deprives them of that right solely because they are same-sex couples and without sufficient justification.

Judge Schreier stayed implementation of her ruling pending appeal. On February 10, the plaintiffs asked her to lift the stay, citing the U.S. Supreme Court's denial of a stay in Alabama cases the previous day. Two days later, they requested an expedited response to that request. On March 2, 2015, Judge Schreier denied this motion. She concluded that once the defendants filed their notice of appeal, jurisdiction issue in the case, including the stay, would be transferred to the Eighth Circuit Court of Appeals. The Eighth Circuit announced on April 29, 2015, that it would defer consideration of the case, pending the U.S. Supreme Court's ruling in Obergefell v. Hodges in June 2015. On June 26, 2015, the Supreme Court ruled that laws depriving same-sex couples of the rights and responsibilities of marriage violate the Due Process and Equal Protection clauses of the Fourteenth Amendment, legalizing same-sex marriage nationwide in the United States. Attorney General Marty Jackley announced that the state would comply, "Because we are a nation of laws the state will be required to follow the court's order that every state must recognize and license same-sex marriage." In light of this development, the Eighth Circuit affirmed the judgement of the district court on August 12, 2015. However, it left the decision of whether or not to vacate the stay of permanent injunction of the laws discriminating against same-sex couples to the district court. On September 9, 2015, Judge Schreier granted the plaintiffs' motion to vacate the stay in light of the mandate from the Eighth Circuit.

Governor Daugaard announced that the state would comply with the ruling, but said, "I would have preferred for this change to come through the democratic process, rather than the courts." Senator John Thune said he disagreed with the decision, "The court has issued its opinion, but on this particular issue, I do not agree with its conclusion." Representative Kristi Noem also disagreed with the ruling, and Senator Mike Rounds called it a "blow to state's rights". State Senator Brock Greenfield called it "judicial activism at its worst". Bishop Paul J. Swain of the Roman Catholic Diocese of Sioux Falls called the ruling "not a surprise but still a sad development". Methodist Bishop Bruce Ough declined to issue a formal stance, but stated that "[w]hile the United Methodist Church does not engage in partisan politics, we welcome all people and believe all have sacred worth" and said the ruling would likely add "urgency to a longtime denominational debate" on the United Methodist Church's position on homosexuality. State Representative Karen Soli welcomed the court ruling, stating "In my own journey through the years, early in my life I wouldn't have felt that way but I've grown to understand that homosexuality is not something most people have a choice about. It's our job in society to accommodate them in ways that make it possible for these folks to be part of our society. It's time." The South Dakota chapter of the American Civil Liberties Union (ACLU) celebrated the decision, "Today's historic Supreme Court ruling means same-sex couples will soon have the freedom to marry and equal respect for their marriages across America. This ruling will bring joy to families, and final nationwide victory to the decades-long Freedom to Marry movement." The ACLU held a celebration party in Sioux Falls on June 26, handing out wedding cake to the newlyweds. Mark Church and Greg Kniffen, plaintiffs in Rosenbrahn, said they were "overjoyed", "We feel vindicated that we were on the right side of this argument all along."

== Developments after legalization ==
Same-sex marriage in the United States

In January 2020, Representative Tony Randolph introduced a bill to the South Dakota House of Representatives to prohibit the state from "enforcing, endorsing or favoring" same-sex marriage. The ACLU responded in a statement, "Marriage equality is the law of the land in South Dakota and the entire nation, no matter what half-baked legal theories anti-LGBTQ lawmakers try to put forward." The bill was withdrawn at Randolph's request on February 24, 2020.

On February 5, 2025, representatives Randolph, Aaron Aylward, Travis Ismay and Tina Mulally, and Senator Carl Perry introduced a resolution urging the U.S. Supreme Court to overturn Obergefell. The House Judiciary Committee voted 4–9 to kill the measure on February 24. It was likely to encounter significant civil opposition if passed, as the majority of South Dakota residents support the legal recognition of same-sex marriage according to polling.

== Native American nations ==
The Indian Civil Rights Act primarily aims to protect the rights of Native Americans but also reinforces the principle of tribal self-governance. While it does not grant sovereignty, the Act affirms the authority of tribes to govern their own legal affairs. Consequently, many tribes have enacted their own marriage and family laws. As a result, the Supreme Court's Obergefell ruling did not automatically apply to tribal jurisdictions. Same-sex marriage is legal on the reservation of the Oglala Sioux Tribe. A memorandum by the tribal attorney from January 25, 2016, confirmed that same-sex marriages are not prohibited under tribal law. The first same-sex marriage in the reservation was performed at the Tribal President's Office in Pine Ridge shortly thereafter. On July 8, 2019, the Oglala Sioux Tribal Council passed a same-sex marriage ordinance, Ordinance No. 19-24 (Lakota: Wóope No. 19-24), in a 12–3 vote with one abstention, amending the Tribal Code to recognize same-sex marriages.

Native Americans have deep-rooted marriage traditions, placing a strong emphasis on community, family and spiritual connections. While there are no records of same-sex marriages being performed in Native American cultures in the way they are commonly defined in Western legal systems, many Indigenous communities recognize identities and relationships that may be placed on the LGBT spectrum. Among these are two-spirit individuals—people who embody both masculine and feminine qualities. In some cultures, two-spirit individuals assigned male at birth wear women's clothing and engage in household and artistic work associated with the feminine sphere. Historically, this identity sometimes allowed for unions between two people of the same biological sex. Among the Lakota, two-spirit people—known as wíŋkte (pronounced [ˈwɪ̃ktɛ])—are regarded as sacred. They occupy a third gender role in Lakota society and traditionally fulfilled ceremonial and spiritual roles, including preparing the traditional Sun Dance (Wiwáŋyaŋg Wačípi) and serving as medicine people (wičháša wakȟáŋ). Marriage with women was forbidden for most wíŋkte, but some nevertheless married women and had children without giving up their two-spirit status. Often, they would marry already-married men who had wives and children. Chief Crazy Horse married one or two wíŋkte in addition to his cisgender wives. Some wíŋkte practiced polyandry, taking up to twelve husbands, while others remained unmarried, erecting their own tipis where they were visited by men for sexual intercourse.

== Demographics and marriage statistics ==
In the first month of legalization, 40 same-sex couples were granted marriage licenses in the state. By June 26, 2016, 157 marriage licenses had been issued to same-sex couples in South Dakota. This made up around 2% of all marriage licenses issued in the state during that time, with most issued in Minnehaha County. By June 2017, 283 same-sex couples had married in South Dakota.

2018 estimates from the United States Census Bureau showed that there were about 1,500 same-sex households in South Dakota. The Bureau estimated that 77.8% of same-sex couples in the state were married. The 2020 U.S. census showed that there were 787 married same-sex couple households (340 male couples and 447 female couples) and 726 unmarried same-sex couple households in South Dakota.

== Public opinion ==
Public opinion for same-sex marriage in South Dakota
Poll source	Dates administered	Sample size	Margin of error	Support	Opposition	Do not know / refused
Public Religion Research Institute	February 28 – December 8, 2025	160 adults	?	55%	44%	1%
Public Religion Research Institute	March 13 – December 2, 2024	157 adults	?	61%	36%	3%
Public Religion Research Institute	March 9 – December 7, 2023	157 adults	?	58%	40%	2%
Public Religion Research Institute	March 11 – December 14, 2022	?	?	63%	37%	<0.5%
Public Religion Research Institute	January 7 – December 20, 2020	144 adults	?	66%	29%	5%
Public Religion Research Institute	April 5 – December 23, 2017	259 adults	?	52%	37%	11%
Public Religion Research Institute	May 18, 2016 – January 10, 2017	367 adults	?	50%	39%	11%
Public Religion Research Institute	April 29, 2015 – January 7, 2016	278 adults	?	39%	57%	4%

== See also ==
- LGBT rights in South Dakota
- Same-sex marriage in the United States
