= Same-sex marriage in North Dakota =

Same-sex marriage has been legal in North Dakota since the U.S. Supreme Court's ruling in Obergefell v. Hodges on June 26, 2015, which invalidated state bans on same-sex marriage throughout the United States. Prior to this, two lawsuits seeking to declare the ban unconstitutional, Ramsay v. Dalrymple and Jorgensen v. Montplaisir, had been filed in the U.S. District Court for the District of North Dakota in June 2014; however, proceedings in both cases were stayed in January 2015 pending the outcome of Obergefell. Following the Supreme Court ruling, District Court Judge Ralph R. Erickson declared the ban unconstitutional.

Previously, North Dakota had restricted marriage to the "union of one man and one woman" both by statute and in its State Constitution. Polling suggests that a majority of North Dakota residents support the legal recognition of same-sex marriage, with a 2021 Public Religion Research Institute poll showing that 69% of residents supported same-sex marriage. Despite this, a number of Republican politicians have continued to introduce motions urging the overturning of Obergefell.

== Legal restrictions ==
=== Statutes ===
While unenforceable, state statutes ban same-sex marriage. In 1997, the North Dakota Legislature passed a law mirroring the provisions of the federal Defense of Marriage Act (DOMA) defining marriage as "a civil contract between one man and one woman" and prohibiting the recognition of same-sex marriages performed out of state.

Following the U.S. Supreme Court's ruling in Obergefell v. Hodges on June 26, 2015, a judiciary committee of the North Dakota Legislature began examining the possibility of removing the now-invalid statutory and constitutional restrictions on same-sex unions. The committee said it would not make any recommendations until at least January 2017. On January 10, 2017, the North Dakota Senate rejected Senate Bill 2043, which would have replaced references to "husband and wife" in state statutes with gender-neutral references to "two people". The bill was rejected by 15 votes to 31, and came after the committee had canvassed the issue though had been unable to come to a formal recommendation. Kelly Armstrong, the chair of the North Dakota Republican Party, voted in favor, but said that the measure was "only symbolic" since same-sex marriage is legal in North Dakota, "I think it's a pretty drastic over-estimation that we would end up in litigation if we don't pass this bill."

=== Constitutional amendment ===
North Dakota voters adopted a constitutional amendment in November 2004 that defined marriage as the "union of a man and a woman" and prohibited the recognition of same-sex relationships in the form of civil unions and domestic partnerships. The referendum was approved by 73% of voters.

== Lawsuits ==
On June 6, 2014, seven same-sex couples filed a federal lawsuit against North Dakota officials, seeking the right to marry and recognition of marriages performed in other jurisdictions. Five of the couples had married in other states and one couple in Canada. The suit, Ramsay v. Dalrymple, was brought by Minneapolis civil rights attorney Joshua A. Newville, who filed a similar lawsuit on behalf of six same-sex couples in South Dakota on May 22, 2014. First-named defendant Governor Jack Dalrymple filed a motion to dismiss on July 1. The plaintiffs filed a motion for summary judgment on July 22. Briefing was completed by September 5. Lambda Legal filed a similar lawsuit, Jorgensen v. Montplaisir, in federal district court on June 9, 2014 on behalf of two women, residents of Fargo, who had married in Minnesota. On January 20, 2015, U.S. District Court Judge Ralph R. Erickson stayed proceedings in both cases pending the outcome of several same-sex marriage cases in the U.S. Supreme Court.

On June 26, 2015, the U.S. Supreme Court ruled in Obergefell v. Hodges that the denial of marriage rights to same-sex couples violates the Due Process and Equal Protection clauses of the Fourteenth Amendment, legalizing same-sex marriage nationwide in the United States. Governor Dalrymple issued a one-sentence statement that acknowledged the decision and said the state would comply, "The U.S. Supreme Court has ruled that same-sex marriage is legal throughout the nation, and we will abide by this federal mandate." Same-sex couples began marrying in North Dakota immediately following the Supreme Court's ruling, with Jesse Masterson and Trever Hill being the first same-sex couple to file marriage paperwork at the Cass County Clerk's Office on June 26. Attorney General Wayne Stenehjem said the state might have to wait for Judge Erickson to issue a ruling lifting the stay he had issued in January, but Newville said there was "no question" about whether same-sex couples had the right to marry in North Dakota, with or without an order from Judge Erickson. Stenehjem nonetheless said that the ruling "overrides any conflicting state, constitutional or statutory provisions". On June 29, Judge Erickson lifted the stay he had issued in Jorgensen and declared North Dakota's constitutional and statutory restrictions on access to marriage by same-sex couples and the recognition of such marriages from other jurisdictions invalid.

State Representative Joshua Boschee welcomed the court ruling, saying that it creates a more compassionate environment for LGBT people, "I think back to, even my own youth, when you didn't have any out people around and you had nobody to look up to. LGBT and their straight friends now live in a country where the full rights and responsibility of marriage are afforded to everyone." Senator Heidi Heitkamp said, "Today is an historic day for equal rights, for justice, and for individuals and couples across the country who can no longer be treated differently because of who they love." A group of supporters gathered outside the Grand Forks County Courthouse to celebrate the court ruling. Among them, former State Senator JoNell Bakke who said she had been "waiting for this to happen for quite some time". "There's still going to be pushback from the state, obviously. But this sets the tone that if it's legal to be married, it's illegal to discriminate against [people who identify as gay]", Bakke said. Opponents of same-sex marriage said they were disappointed. Senator John Hoeven said, "I, like many others across America, am disappointed by today's Supreme Court ruling approving same-sex marriage, and believe as a matter of religious principle that marriage is the union between one man and one woman", despite the United States being a secular state. Kevin Cramer, U.S. Representative for North Dakota's at-large congressional district, said the ruling was "another example of activist judges overstepping their authority".

== Developments after legalization ==
Same-sex marriage in the United States

On January 7, 2025, representatives Bill Tveit and Jeff Hoverson introduced a resolution to the North Dakota House of Representatives urging the U.S. Supreme Court to overturn Obergefell. The measure was withdrawn nine days later. It was likely to encounter significant civil opposition if passed, as the majority of North Dakota residents support the legal recognition of same-sex marriage according to polling.

A new motion was introduced on January 29, and passed the House 52–40 on February 24. Supporting the motion, Tveit incorrectly stated that the "definition of marriage has been solely between a man and a woman for millennia". This is erroneous as two-spirit marriages are known to have been performed in Native American cultures in North Dakota prior to European colonization. The Senate rejected the resolution by a 16–31 vote on March 13, 2025, with at least two dozen Republicans joining the Democratic-NPL lawmakers in opposing the measure.

== Native American nations ==
The Indian Civil Rights Act primarily aims to protect the rights of Native Americans but also reinforces the principle of tribal self-governance. While it does not grant sovereignty, the Act affirms the authority of tribes to govern their own legal affairs. Consequently, many tribes have enacted their own marriage and family laws. As a result, the Supreme Court's Obergefell ruling did not automatically apply to tribal jurisdictions. In August 2020, the Tribal Council of the Turtle Mountain Band of Chippewa Indians legalized same-sex marriage by a vote of 6–2, making it the first Native American tribe in North Dakota to do so. The Council replaced all references to "husband and wife" in the Tribal Code (Ojibwe: Onaakonigewin) with the gender-neutral term "spouses". Other tribes in North Dakota do not perform same-sex marriages. The Law and Order Code (Dakota: Woope) of the Spirit Lake Tribe states that marriages consummated by tribal custom are valid, but requires that the parties declare in the presence of the officiant that they take each other as "husband and wife". The Law and Order Code of the Standing Rock Sioux Tribe provides that "for a man and a woman to be married under this chapter" they must be at least 18 years old, or 16 if they have obtained the consent of their parents or guardians, and freely consent themselves. The code also states that any marriage validly contracted in the United States, any tribe, state, or foreign nation shall be "for all purposes" recognized as valid by the Standing Rock Sioux Tribe.

Native Americans have deep-rooted marriage traditions, placing a strong emphasis on community, family and spiritual connections. While there are no records of same-sex marriages being performed in Native American cultures in the way they are commonly defined in Western legal systems, many Indigenous communities recognize identities and relationships that may be placed on the LGBT spectrum. Among these are two-spirit individuals—people who embody both masculine and feminine qualities. In some cultures, two-spirit individuals assigned male at birth wear women's clothing and engage in household and artistic work associated with the feminine sphere. Historically, this identity sometimes allowed for unions between two people of the same biological sex. The Dakota refer to two-spirit people as wiŋkta (pronounced [ˈwĩkta]). Many wiŋkta married cisgender men, without indication of polygyny, but some remained unmarried and lived in their own tipis, and were visited by married men for sexual intercourse when the men's wives were pregnant or menstruating, and therefore when sexual intercourse was forbidden to them. Among the Hidatsa, two-spirit people—known as míahdi (pronounced [míàhti])—traditionally performed handiwork such as beadwork and quillwork. They also commonly took in orphans from their tribe or children captured on raids, were allowed to access ceremonial groups reserved to women, and were important for the preparation of the traditional Sun Dance. Míahdi were sometimes wives in polygynous households but also established their own households with older, unmarried, childless men and filled out the household with adoptive children. Other nations also have distinct terms and respected roles for two-spirit people. The Arikara use skuxát (pronounced [sku̥xə́t]), and the Mandan use wąrų́ųxik nų́p. The Ojibwe refer to two-spirit people as niizh manidoowag (pronounced [niːʒ maˈnɪˌdoːˌwak]). Many were wives in polygynous households.

== Demographics and marriage statistics ==
Data from the 2000 U.S. census showed that 703 same-sex couples were living in North Dakota. By 2005, this had increased to 1,070 couples, likely attributed to same-sex couples' growing willingness to disclose their partnerships on government surveys. Same-sex couples lived in all counties of the state, except Hettinger and Slope counties, and constituted 0.5% of coupled households and 0.3% of all households in the state. Most couples lived in Cass, Burleigh and Grand Forks counties, but the counties with the highest percentage of same-sex couples were Logan (0.73% of all county households) and Oliver (0.63%). Same-sex partners in North Dakota were on average older than opposite-sex partners, and less likely to be employed. The average and median household incomes of same-sex couples were lower than different-sex couples, and same-sex couples were also far less likely to own a home than opposite-sex partners. 40% of same-sex couples in North Dakota were raising children under the age of 18, with an estimated 424 children living in households headed by same-sex couples in 2005.

As of November 30, 2015, approximately 60 marriage licenses had been issued to same-sex couples in North Dakota. Of the state's 53 counties, 18 had issued at least one marriage license to a same-sex couple, mostly in Cass, Grand Forks, Burleigh and Ward counties. By January 5, 2016, the number had risen to approximately 75, accounting for over 1.5% of all marriage licenses issued in the state during that period.

The 2020 U.S. census showed that there were 671 married same-sex couple households (264 male couples and 407 female couples) and 715 unmarried same-sex couple households in North Dakota.

== Public opinion ==
Public opinion for same-sex marriage in North Dakota
| Poll source | Dates administered | Sample size | Margin of error | Support | Opposition | Do not know / refused |
|---|---|---|---|---|---|---|
| Public Religion Research Institute | February 28 – December 8, 2025 | 158 adults | ? | 64% | 36% | <0.5% |
| North Dakota News Cooperative | February 27 – March 2, 2025 | 500 voters | ± 4.0% | 56% | 36% | 8% |
| Public Religion Research Institute | March 13 – December 2, 2024 | 168 adults | ? | 61% | 38% | 1% |
| Public Religion Research Institute | March 9 – December 7, 2023 | 158 adults | ? | 59% | 40% | 1% |
| Public Religion Research Institute | March 11 – December 14, 2022 | ? | ? | 66% | 34% | <0.5% |
| Public Religion Research Institute | March 8 – November 9, 2021 | ? | ? | 69% | 30% | 1% |
| Public Religion Research Institute | January 7 – December 20, 2020 | 151 adults | ? | 55% | 45% | <0.5% |
| Public Religion Research Institute | April 5 – December 23, 2017 | 247 adults | ? | 53% | 35% | 12% |
| Public Religion Research Institute | May 18, 2016 – January 10, 2017 | 331 adults | ? | 46% | 46% | 8% |
| Public Religion Research Institute | April 29, 2015 – January 7, 2016 | 276 adults | ? | 43% | 44% | 13% |
| Forum Communications/University of North Dakota | October 2014 | 505 likely voters | ± 5.0% | 37% | 50% | 13% |

In the poll conducted by Forum Communications and the University of North Dakota's College of Business and Public Administration in October 2014, 50% of North Dakota voters opposed the legalization of same-sex marriage and 37% supported it. Some 9% reported they were neutral and 4% had refused to answer. According to an earlier report by the Williams Institute, support for same-sex marriage had been 23% in 2004 and 40% in 2012.

According to the 2025 North Dakota News Cooperative poll, support for same-sex marriage varied greatly by political affiliation; with 89% of Democrats, 57% of Independents and 43% of Republicans favoring marriage rights for same-sex couples.

== See also ==
- LGBT rights in North Dakota
- Same-sex marriage in the United States
