= Kelly Loving Act =

2025 Colorado anti-discrimination law

Colorado Legislature
- Territorial extent: Colorado
- Enacted by: Colorado House of Representatives
- Enacted: April 6, 2025
- Enacted by: Colorado Senate
- Enacted: May 6, 2025
- Signed by: Jared Polis
- Signed: May 16, 2025
- Effective: October 1, 2026

Legislative history

First chamber: Colorado House of Representatives
- Introduced: March 28, 2025
- First reading: April 1, 2025
- Second reading: April 4, 2025
- Third reading: April 6, 2025
- Voting summary: 36 voted for; 20 voted against; 9 absent

Second chamber: Colorado Senate
- Received from the Colorado House of Representatives: April 22, 2025
- First reading: May 1, 2025
- Second reading: May 5, 2025
- Third reading: May 6, 2025
- Voting summary: 20 voted for; 14 voted against; 1 absent

Summary
- Modifies the Colorado Anti-Discrimination Act to provide legal protections to transgender individuals.
- Status: Not yet in force

Colorado House Bill 25-1312, known officially as the Kelly Loving Act and sometimes referred to as Legal Protections for Transgender Individuals, is a 2025 law in the state of Colorado that modifies the Colorado Anti-Discrimination Act to provide protections for transgender people in the state. It is named after Kelly Loving, a transgender woman who was killed in the 2022 Club Q mass shooting in Colorado Springs. It was signed into law by Governor Jared Polis on May 16, 2025 following extensive amendments and will go into effect on October 1, 2026.

As of June 2025, multiple lawsuits are pending over the Kelly Loving Act, claiming it violates free speech. A provision was included that would have considered it "coercive control" to not use a child's preferred pronouns as a parent in a child custody dispute, but was removed before final passage.

== Provisions ==
The Kelly Loving Act includes general provisions against discrimination for transgender people. It can be considered discriminatory to not use a transgender persons' preferred name, requires schools to allow students to dress in permitted ways that align with their gender identity, and removes the need for a court order to change their gender marker on any form of identification if one has already had a change in the past. It also acts as a "shield" law for minors receiving or wishing to receive gender-affirming medical care, prohibiting the enforcement of out-of-state laws regarding such care.

== Reactions ==
=== Support ===
The bill was generally supported by Colorado Democrats. It was also supported by One Colorado, an LGBTQ+ advocacy group, as well as Colorado chapters of the Democratic Socialists of America.

=== Opposition ===
The Kelly Loving Act was opposed by the Ethics & Religious Liberty Commission and the Baptist Press prior to final passage, referring to it as "radical gender ideology." A group of around 100 education leaders sent a letter to the Colorado House Judiciary Committee in late April opposing the Kelly Loving Act.

== See also ==
- LGBTQ rights in Colorado
