= Senate Bill 149 (92nd Session Legislative Assembly of the South Dakota Legislature, 2017) =

Senate Bill 149 (SB 149), officially called An Act to provide certain protections to faith-based or religious child-placement agencies, is a 2017 anti-LGBT law that was enacted in the state of South Dakota that permits taxpayer-funded agencies to deny services on the basis of religious exemptions.

== Passage ==
On March 2, 2017, the South Dakota House of Representatives passed SB 149, with 43 ayes, 20 nays, and 7 excused votes. On March 7, 2017, the South Dakota Senate passed SB 149, with 27 ayes, and 8 nays. On May 10, 2017, Dennis Daugaard signed SB 149 into law, which became S.J. 746.

== See also ==
- LGBT rights in South Dakota
