= Whitmarsh =

Whitmarsh is a surname. Notable people with the name include:

- Louis Whitmarsh, appellant of South Dakota Supreme Court case State v. Whitmarsh regarding fellatio
- Martin Whitmarsh (born 1958), British businessman
- Megan Whitmarsh (born 1972), American artist
- Micah Whitmarsh, namesake of Col. Micah Whitmarsh House in Rhode Island, United States
- Mike Whitmarsh (1962–2009), American volleyball and basketball player
- Theodore Whitmarsh (1869–1936), American businessman and politician
- Tim Whitmarsh, British classicist
- Zach Whitmarsh (born 1977), Canadian track and field athlete
