= LGBTQ rights in Colorado =

- Colorado (US)
- Legal status: Legal since 1972
- Gender identity: State does not require surgery to change gender on official documents
- Discrimination protections: Sexual orientation and gender identity/expression are protected categories

Family rights
- Recognition of relationships: Designated beneficiary agreements since 2009; Civil unions since 2013; Same-sex marriage since 2014
- Adoption: Full adoption rights since 2014

Lesbian, gay, bisexual, transgender, and queer (LGBTQ) people in the U.S. state of Colorado enjoy the same rights as non-LGBTQ people. In 1972, Colorado became one of the first U.S. states to decriminalize same-sex sexual activity. Same-sex marriage has been recognized since October 2014, and the state enacted civil unions in 2013, which provide some of the rights and benefits of marriage. State law also prohibits discrimination on account of sexual orientation and gender identity in employment, housing and public accommodations and the use of conversion therapy on minors. In July 2020, Colorado became the 11th U.S. state to abolish the gay panic defense.

Colorado is frequently referred to as one of the most LGBT-friendly states in the Mountain West. The LGBT think tank Movement Advancement Project ranks Colorado second in the region for LGBTQ rights legislation, behind Nevada. 2019 polling from the Public Religion Research Institute showed that 77% of Colorado residents supported anti-discrimination legislation protecting LGBTQ people.

== History and law regarding same-sex sexual activity ==
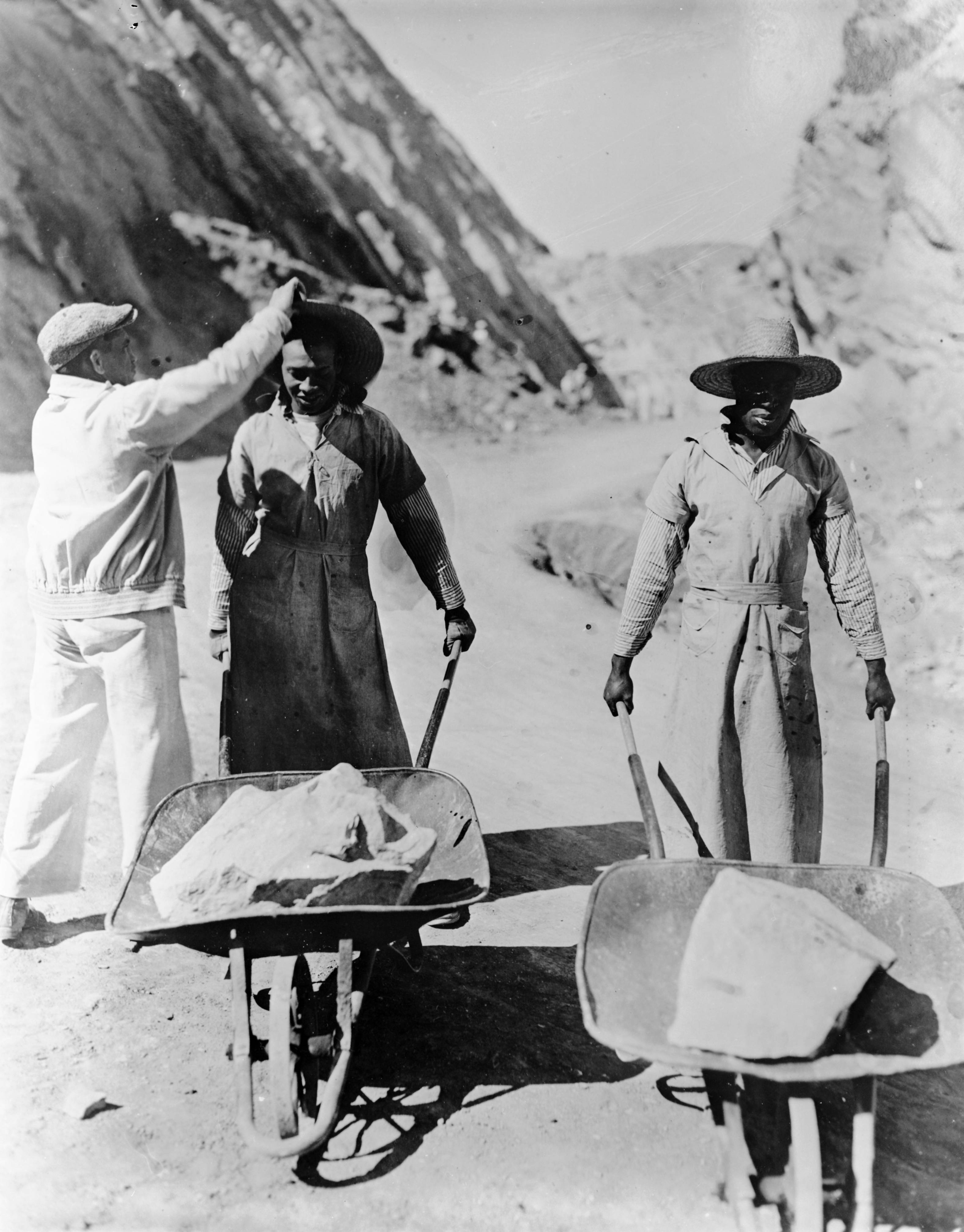
Two men accused of homosexual sexual activity being punished by wearing female clothing and wheeling heavy rocks, Cañon City, 1900-1910?

The Arapaho, who now live on the Wind River Indian Reservation in Wyoming, recognize male-bodied individuals who act, behave and live as women, referred to as haxu'xan. The haxu'xan, like women, are traditionally in charge of food preparation and dressing hides to make clothing and bedding. They form a "third gender" in Arapaho society, and can even marry men. The Arapaho believe their gender is "a supernatural gift from birds and animals".

In 1860, sodomy was made illegal in Colorado, then the Jefferson Territory, under its first criminal code, which indirectly prohibited sodomy by expressly recognizing common law, under which the maximum penalty for sodomy was death. In 1861, the U.S. Congress created the Colorado Territory, whose government enacted a criminal code that punished sodomy (as defined by common law) with penalties ranging from one year to life in prison. In 1922, the Colorado Supreme Court ruled that the ban did not prohibit fellatio (oral sex), even though the court felt that the behavior was "more vile and filthy than sodomy". The law was revised in 1939 to expressly cover anal intercourse and oral sex, whether heterosexual or homosexual, and the maximum penalty was reduced to fourteen years. In 1953, Colorado enacted a psychopathic offender law that provided for indefinite institutionalization for committing sex crimes, thus putting homosexuals in the same category as rapists and child molesters. The law was struck down by the U.S. Supreme Court in 1967 in Specht v. Patterson, holding that the law was "unconstitutional because the defendants were not afforded basic due process of law in the proceedings". In 1970, the Colorado Supreme Court ruled that the sodomy ban also included cunnilingus.

In 1971, Colorado revised its penal code and decriminalized sodomy in cases that involved non-commercial, private acts between consenting adults. At the same time, it instituted a public indecency law that banned public displays of affection between same-sex couples. The Colorado Supreme Court struck down that statute in 1974. The Gay Coalition of Denver contributed to the decriminalization of four of the discriminatory laws in the city of Denver. Their City Council Revolt in 1972 was the first time a LGBTQ advocacy organization joined to force law changes.

== Recognition of same-sex relationships ==
In 1975, the Boulder County Clerk issued marriage licenses to several same-sex couples after the local district attorney interpreted Colorado's statutes, which used the phrase "any two persons", to be gender-neutral with respect to marriage. State Attorney General J.D. MacFarlane issued a contrary opinion that those marriages were invalid. When one of those married in Boulder tried to use it to sponsor his husband for immigration purposes, he lost his case, Adams v. Howerton, in federal court. In 2016, U.S. Citizenship and Immigration Services reversed its decision from 1975 and granted permanent residency status to Anthony Sullivan, based on his marriage to Richard Adams in Boulder on April 21, 1975.

In 1996, Governor Roy Romer vetoed legislation which would have banned recognition of same-sex marriages. In his notice to the General Assembly, Governor Romer wrote "It is one thing to believe, as I do, that marriage is for the union of a man and woman. It is quite another to believe that committed same sex relationships do not exist and should not be recognized by society." In 2006, a state referendum added language to the Colorado Constitution that restricted marriage and common law marriage to couples of different sexes, without mentioning civil unions or domestic partnerships. In November 2024, over 64% of Colorado voters called Amendment J repealed the 2006 anti-gay clause within the state constitution.

In April 2009, Colorado enacted a designated beneficiaries law, effective July 1, that allowed anyone to make a same-sex partner the beneficiary of insurance, inheritance, hospital visitations, funeral arrangements and death benefits, and other important matters.

In 2011 and 2012, state lawmakers attempted but failed to pass an act formally recognizing civil unions, though Governor John Hickenlooper endorsed the legislation in his 2012 State of the State address. In March 2013, both houses of the Democratic-controlled General Assembly passed legislation establishing civil unions that provide rights comparable to those provided to opposite-sex married couples and Governor Hickenlooper signed the bill into law on March 21, 2013. The law went into effect on May 1, 2013.

Governor Hickenlooper signed a bill permitting joint state income tax filing for civil partners and out-of-state same-sex married couples.

On February 19, 2014, nine same-sex couples, some unmarried and some married in other jurisdictions, filed a lawsuit in state court challenging the state's definition of marriage and arguing that civil unions created a "second-class level of citizenship" for gays and lesbians. The suit, McDaniel-Miccio v. Hickenlooper, named Governor Hickenlooper and the Denver City Clerk as defendants. The clerk expressed support for same-sex marriage. Attorney General John Suthers, a Republican, announced he would defend the state's definition of marriage. On October 6, Suthers asked the Tenth Circuit to dismiss his appeal and lift the stay after the U.S. Supreme Court left in place as binding precedent other Tenth Circuit decisions holding bans on same-sex marriage unconstitutional in Oklahoma and Utah. Same-sex marriage became legal on October 7, 2014 after the Colorado Supreme Court lifted the last legal barriers and Attorney General John Suthers told clerks around the state to begin issuing licenses.

In January 2021, the Colorado Supreme Court ruled that the state must retroactively recognize common-law same-sex marriages that occurred prior to legalization in 2014.

In December 2024, it was reported that the building that conducted the first marriage license to a same-sex couple in the 1970s by Clela Rorex, a Boulder County clerk became officially a national monument.

== Adoption and parenting ==
A single LGBT person and same-sex couples can petition to adopt in Colorado. Second-parent adoptions are permitted under state law, though the process is more elaborate and expensive than that required of married couples.

Lesbian couples can access assisted reproduction services, such as in vitro fertilization. State law recognizes the non-genetic, non-gestational mother as a legal parent to a child born via donor insemination, but only if the parents are married. While there are no specific surrogacy laws in Colorado, the courts have ruled that the practice is legal and surrogacy contracts can be recognized as legally valid. Both gestational and traditional contracts are recognized, though the latter may result in potential legal conflicts and more litigation than the former. The state treats different-sex and same-sex couples equally under the same terms and conditions.

Several Catholic adoption agencies do not place children either with single persons or with same-sex couples.

On May 20, 2022, Governor Jared Polis signed "Marlo's Law," a bill to reform adoption and parentage laws that apply to children conceived through IVF. Non-gestational parents still have to adopt their own children, even when they are biologically related to the child and married to a legal parent, but the process has become simpler. The bill had passed both houses of the Colorado General Assembly with amendments to specify that it doesn't apply to children conceived through surrogacy.

== Discrimination protections ==
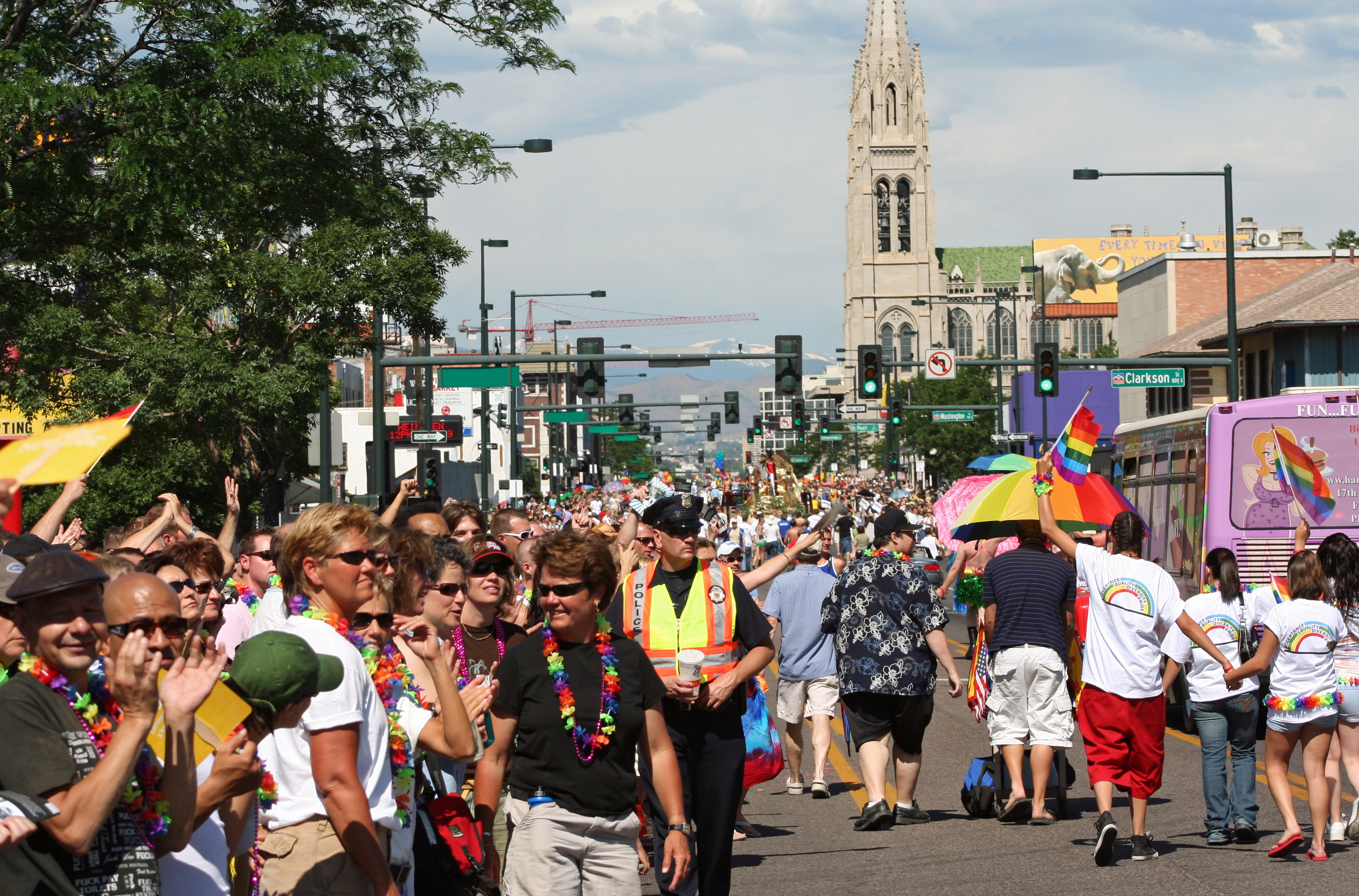
PrideFest in Denver, June 2008

It has been illegal to discriminate on the basis of sexual orientation and gender identity or expression in employment, housing, public accommodations, education, and credit since the category "sexual orientation" was added to the state's anti-discrimination law in 2008. The bill was controversial and following its passage by the General Assembly opponents waged a media campaign that failed to persuade Governor Bill Ritter to withhold his signature. State statutes define "sexual orientation" as "an individual's orientation toward heterosexuality, homosexuality, bisexuality, or transgender status or another individual's perception thereof."

Moreover, the state's anti-bullying law prohibits bullying on the basis of disability, race, creed, color, sex, sexual orientation, gender identity, national origin, religion, ancestry, or need for special education services. The law, which also includes cyberbullying, applies to all school districts, and requires them to "adopt a safe school plan and conduct and discipline code that contains a specific policy addressing bullying prevention and education", including regular surveys of students' impression, character building, the designation of a team of persons at each school to advise the school administration concerning the severity and frequency of bullying incidents, and requirements for how the conduct and discipline code must by publicized.

On November 3, 1992, Colorado voters approved Initiative 2, an initiated constitutional amendment, which added language to the State Constitution that prohibited the state and all of its subdivisions from allowing "homosexual, lesbian or bisexual orientation, conduct, practices or relationships" to provide the basis for any "claim any minority status, quota preferences, protected status or claim of discrimination." In 1994, the Colorado Supreme Court found the amendment unconstitutional. In 1996, the U.S. Supreme Court held in Romer v. Evans that the amendment, because it "allows discrimination against homosexuals and prevents the state from protecting them", was "motivated by animus towards homosexuals" and violated their rights under the Equal Protection Clause of the Fourteenth Amendment.

In June 2012, a gay couple who had married in Massachusetts tried to purchase a wedding cake at a bakery in Lakewood, and were refused. They sued to force the bakery to provide them with the same services as other customers, and on December 6 Administrative Law Judge Robert N. Spencer ruled for the plaintiffs in Craig v. Masterpiece Cakeshop. He dismissed the bakery's claim that requiring the business to provide the service violated its owner's rights to free speech or religious expression. In June 2018, this ruling was thrown out by the U.S. Supreme Court on a 7 to 2 ruling in favor of the defendant, in Masterpiece Cakeshop v. Colorado Civil Rights Commission.

In July 2021, Colorado implemented strong legislation - a first for the United States - to explicitly ban both sexual orientation and gender identity biased algorithms within high-tech companies and industries.

In December 2022, SCOTUS decided it would "take up the case" under the First Amendment and hear arguments of a Colorado website designer - that discriminates, opposes and refuses to serve individuals within same-sex marriages.

In May 2025, Governor Jared Polis signed the Kelly Loving Act into law, strengthening anti-discrimination protections against transgender Coloradans.

== Hate crime law ==
The state's hate crime law has provided protections based on both sexual orientation and gender identity or expression since 2001. In 2009, in a case thought to be "the first in which a hate crime law was applied in a murder trial where the victim was transgender", a jury in Greeley convicted a man of first-degree murder and found that it was a hate crime under Colorado law. The law provides penalty enhancements if a crime is motivated by the victim's actual or perceived sexual orientation or gender identity, amongst other categories.

In November 2022, in Colorado Springs a mass shooting at a gay bar occurred. The Governor ordered all flags within Colorado to be a lowered. The headquarters of Focus on the Family an anti-gay hate group since 1977, is based in Colorado Springs. Up until the 1990s, Colorado was informally well known as "the hate state". Two patrons at the establishment prevented more lives from being taken or lost, by stopping the gunman immediately. The shooter is the grandson of a high-profile Californian Republican lawmaker it was reported - "who has extreme and out there views on various social, economic and political issues".

It was reported within Colorado, that hate crimes on individuals based on sexual orientation alone have increased by 380% since 2018.

In December 2022, it was reported that Colorado Springs Police Department have charged the gay bar shooter and perpetrator within Colorado Springs is facing 305 charges and ongoing court trials. The FBI law enforcement Colorado team is also investigating all the websites as well (both visited and created) by the perpetrators (himself and possibly others) - in the connection to the shootings at Colorado Springs. In April 2023, several "emergency clause" bills on restricting and toughening up guns and firearms - was signed into law effective immediately and implemented by the Governor of Colorado, that passed the Colorado General Assembly in March 2023. In June 2023, a lawsuit against the Sheriff's Department was filed - because Colorado was meant to enforce the infamous 3 year old "red flag law", that was invalidated and declared null and void by a federal judge in Oklahoma (part of the United States Court of Appeals for the Tenth Circuit), because a criminal got too easy access to a firearm (immediately just before the Club Q shooting happened).

== Transgender rights ==
Between January 1, 1984 to February 13, 2019, changing the gender marker on a birth certificate required undergoing sex reassignment surgery.

The 2016 film Growing Up Coy documented a landmark 2013 case in which the Colorado Civil Rights Division ruled in favor of allowing transgender six-year-old Coy Mathis to use the girls' bathroom at her elementary school in Fountain, Colorado. The case has been credited with setting off a wave of bathroom bills across the United States in the years following.

In February 2019, the requirement to undertake surgical procedures was removed by a unanimous vote by the board of the Colorado Department of Public Health and Environment. The applicant for a gender change can simply do so by request, to the Division of Motor Vehicles (by completing a "Change of Sex Designation" form) if the change concerns a driver's license or a state ID, or to the Department of Health (by completing a "Birth Certificate Correction Form" and a "Sex Designation Form") if the change concerns a birth certificate. Minors are also permitted to change legal gender, but require the consent of a parent or guardian and a medical or mental health professional.

Birth certificates have four sex descriptor; "M" (male), "F" (female), "Intersex" and "X". State IDs and driver's licenses have three descriptor; male, female and X.

In October 2021, it was announced that beginning in 2023, basic health insurance coverage within Colorado must legally and explicitly include sexual reassignment surgery as a human right for individuals as a basic policy — a legal first for the United States.

In April 2023, both the Colorado General Assembly and the Governor of Colorado passed and signed into law respectively - implemented legislation that protect, defend and guarantee gender-affirming healthcare services within Colorado and "safe passage of transgender individuals from interstate".

From the end of 2024, the Colorado Department of Corrections will implement policies for transgender inmates - regarding gender-affirming healthcare and other related issues. This was bought about with a court "settlement" from a lawsuit.

=== Sports ===
In April 2025, the D49 school board voted 3-2 to advance the Preserving Fairness and Safety in Sports policy banning biologically male students from female sports and vice versa. In June The D-11 Board of Education voted 6-1 to approve a similar policy and Academy District 20 followed suit. In December 2025, an "undisclosed lawsuit settlement" was reached for banning trans individuals from playing on female sports teams within some association governing districts within Colorado.

=== Gender-affirming care for trans youth ===
==== Proposition 135 ====
In 2026, Proposition 135, which prohibits gender-affirming surgery for minors in the state, and would ban the use of state or federal funds, insurance coverage, or Medicaid reimbursements to pay for gender-affirming surgery in Colorado narrowly passed during the 2026 general election. Proponents argued that children are not mature enough to consent to surgeries, whereas opponents argued that decisions about medical treatment for children should be left between parents, families and doctors. Opponents also expressed concern that the text of the measure is vaguely written enough that it could apply to certain non-transgender surgeries too.

Proposition 135 was led by Erin Lee, whom Colorado Newsline described as a "prominent anti-LGBTQ activist" and her organization Protect Kids Colorado, a local advocacy group that claims to "oppose indoctrination concerning sexualization & gender transition." Lee described the organization as aiming to mobilize Coloradans and churches around “biblical and biological truth.” Lee had previously tried and failed to get several anti-LGBTQ measures on the ballot in Colorado during the 2024 election. In October 2026, Lee face criticism for saying inflicting violence on her opponents would be "gratifying" when discussing the ballot measure on a podcast with Colorado Republican Party activist, Joe Oltmann.

Proposition 135 enacts the Protect Children from Irreversible Sex Change Surgery Act, prohibiting gender-affirming surgery for Colorado residents under the age of 18. The measure would not prohibit male circumcision or "medically verifiable disorders of sex development" and "acquired physical or chemical abnormalities", although the ballot text does not clarify which particular procedures would fall under this exception. The text also does not say what constitutes an "acquired" condition and it is unclear whether surgeries related to sex for other conditions like Gynecomastia would be banned under the initiative.

Proposition 135 would also prohibit minors from using state and federal funds (including insurance coverage or Medicaid reimbursements) to pay for gender-affirming surgery which would remove the option for families to seek surgery out of state. The Colorado Department of Health Care Policy and Financing stated the state's Medicaid program has not covered a gender-affirming surgery in at least two years. There is no available on how many surgeries covered by private insurance.

Immediately following the results, opponents of Proposition 135 began discussing potential legal challenges to the measure. Z Williams, director of the Bread and Roses Legal Center and a contributor to the Kelly Loving Act, a Colorado law that expands civil rights and legal protections for transgender individuals, stated that advocates fully intend to challenge Proposition 135 in court and had begun preparing for the possibility of the measures passing about two months before Election Day. Williams added "We have some of the best policies in place in terms of anti-discrimination and healthcare protections that still exist, and they will remain existing. And also, we have a plan to fight".

The Families Not Politics coalition which led the opposition to Proposition 135 and includes One Colorado, Rocky Mountain Equality, the Transgender Law Center and Inside Out Youth Services, Planned Parenthood of the Rocky Mountains and Cobalt, an abortion-rights organization, similarly pledged to "exhaust every option" to defend transgender young people's rights.

Scott Skinner-Thompson, a University of Colorado law professor said he expects families challenging the law to allege state constitutional violations, alleging that the new laws infringe on their right to make medical decisions or their right to free expression. He noted that Colorado's Amendment 2 which passed in 1992, faced similar legal challenges and was ultimately overturned by courts in 1996, saying "It's not as if these changes will necessarily last forever. For the LGBTQ rights movement, it's a setback. There are many trans youth who woke up this morning and felt the sting of what looks like the result. But the queer community is resilient, and Colorado has been here before.”

Protect Kids Colorado, meanwhile, stated that its legal team was monitoring potential challenges and was prepared to defend the propositions through available legal avenues.

Following the results, Governor-elect Phil Weiser expressed willingness to consider legislative changes to Propositions 135, stating that his administration would examine what adjustments were necessary and appropriate. Protect Kids Colorado accused Weiser of trying to "circumvent democracy" by disguising an effort to rewrite the measure as a "necessary administrative fix."

Unlike constitutional amendments, Proposition 135 would only change Colorado statutes, meaning the state legislature can later revise or repeal it with just a simple majority vote. Because of this, transgender advocates immediately began calling for lawmakers to repeal the measure, with Williams saying "This is not over. This is just the beginning." On November 7, 2026, hundreds of opponents of the measure held a rally at the Colorado State Capital demanding the legislature take action to repeal the measure.

State Representative Lorena Garcia, said lawmakers would work with trans rights groups to find a solution and said "nothing is off the table". She said what they ultimately decide to do will depend on "what is possible and what the coalition of organizations working on behalf of transgender people wants to see happen".

State Representative Jennifer Bacon, said she is working with opponents of the ballot measures to determine the next legislative next steps.

State Senate President James Coleman, said he anticipates having conversations with the Senate Democratic caucus about the measure and what to do about it, saying "I don't think it's going to be a light decision".

Protect Kids Colorado responded by urging lawmakers to resist the pressure to repeal the measure and warned lawmakers that if they attempt to repeal or modify the initiative at all, they will face "political accountability".

== Conversion therapy ==
On March 10, 2015, the Colorado House of Representatives approved 35–29 a bill banning sexual orientation change efforts (conversion therapy) with minors. However, the bill failed to pass the Colorado Senate.

On March 17, 2016, the House voted 35–29 in favor of a bill sponsored by Representative Dominick Moreno which would have outlawed the use of conversion therapy on LGBT minors. The bill was postponed indefinitely in a Senate committee in a 3–2 vote on April 11, 2016.

In March 2017, the Colorado House of Representatives passed for the third time a ban on conversion therapy on minors, but got blocked for the third time in three years in the Colorado Senate.

In December 2018, Denver introduced an ordinance banning conversion therapy on LGBT minors. The proposal passed council committee and floor votes unanimously by a vote of 13–0 on January 7, 2019. The ordinance took effect immediately after signature from Mayor Michael Hancock a week later. Denver became the first jurisdiction in the state to implement a ban on conversion therapy on LGBT minors.

On February 19, 2019, the House passed a bill to ban the use of conversion therapy on minors, with a 42–19 majority. The Senate approved the bill on March 25 with a 21–13 majority. The bill was amended in the Senate, and sent back to the House for another vote, which voted in favor of the amended version. On May 31, 2019, Governor Jared Polis, the United States' first openly gay governor, signed the bill into law. Colorado became the 17th U.S. state (plus the District of Columbia) to ban the use of the discredited practice on minors. Upon challenge, the law was upheld by the 10th U.S. Circuit Court of Appeals in Denver. However, on March 10, 2025, the U.S. Supreme Court agreed to hear a challenge. The question before the Supreme Court was whether Colorado's law unconstitutionally restricts the speech of therapists or whether it appropriately regulates the behavior of licensed professionals.

On March 31, 2026, the U.S. Supreme Court ruled in Chiles v. Salazar, by an 8–1 vote, that Colorado's conversion therapy ban needed to be held in strict scrutiny by the lower court, as the use of licensing authority to restrict the topics therapists may discuss with clients constituted a form of viewpoint discrimination.

On May 8, 2026, Colorado passed HB 26-1322; the bill redefines conversion therapy as the direction of a patient towards a "pre-determined" gender identity or sexual orientation outcome, and also removes the statute of limitations for individuals to file claims against mental health professionals who practice conversion therapy in violation of Colorado law. The new definition is intended to comply with Salazar, as it no longer regulates a viewpoint.

== Gay panic defense ==
In June 2020, the Colorado General Assembly passed a bipartisan bill to abolish the gay panic defense. In July 2020, the bill was signed into law by Governor Jared Polis, and went into effect immediately.

== Veteran benefits ==
In April 2021, the Colorado General Assembly passed a bill, by a vote of 47–16 in the House and 34–0 in the Senate, to restore benefits to LGBT veterans who had received a dishonorable discharge under Don't Ask, Don't Tell. Governor Jared Polis signed the bill into law on April 19, 2021.

== Freedom of expression ==
In February 2021, a gay man filed a lawsuit in federal district court against his metropolitan district's rules banning rainbow flags. The American Civil Liberties Union argues the rules breach the First Amendment of the United States Constitution. In March 2021, a federal district court ordered that the city stop enforcing the rule which prohibited the Pride flag.

In July 2021, the United States Court of Appeals for the Tenth Circuit dismissed a case from a web designer who refused to offer her services to same-sex couples and originally started the lawsuit in Denver. In February 2022, it was formally announced that the Christian web designer case would have gone straight to the SCOTUS. In June 2023, the Christian web designer won the case along with the baker case precedent - by a 6-3 vote at the SCOTUS.

== Bathroom gender protection law ==
In 2023, Colorado implemented a law allowing full access to bathroom facilities for all genders - to increase public health and safety protections. Similar legislation was implemented in California, Vermont, Illinois, New Mexico, and New York State.

== Public opinion ==
A 2017 Public Religion Research Institute poll found that 71% of Colorado residents supported same-sex marriage, while 21% were opposed and 8% were unsure.

Public opinion for LGBT anti-discrimination laws in Colorado
Poll source	Date(s) administered	Sample size	Margin of error	% support	% opposition	% no opinion
Public Religion Research Institute	January 2-December 30, 2019	1,065	?	77%	18%	5%
Public Religion Research Institute	January 3-December 30, 2018	880	?	72%	21%	7%
Public Religion Research Institute	April 5-December 23, 2017	1,210	?	74%	19%	7%
Public Religion Research Institute	April 29, 2015-January 7, 2016	1,346	?	73%	23%	4%

== Summary table ==
Same-sex sexual activity legal	Yes (Since 1972)
Equal age of consent (17)	Yes (Since 1972)
Anti-discrimination laws in all areas	Yes (Since 2008 for sexual orientation and gender identity)
Same-sex marriages	Yes (Since 2014; constitutional ban repealed in 2024, codified in state statues in 2025)
Recognition of same-sex couples (e.g. civil union)	Yes (Since 2013)
Joint and stepchild adoption by same-sex couples	Yes (Since 2014)
Lesbian, gay and bisexual people allowed to serve openly in the military	Yes (Since 2011)
Transgender people allowed to serve openly in the military	(Banned since 2025 via Executive Order and SCOTUS decision)
Intersex people allowed to serve openly in the military	(Current DoD policy bans "hermaphrodites" from serving or enlisting in the military)
Right to change legal gender without sex reassignment surgery	Yes (Since 2019)
Third gender option	Yes
Conversion therapy practices banned on minors	Yes (From 2019 to March 2026; again in May 2026)
Gay and trans panic defense banned	Yes (Since 2020)
LGBT anti-bullying law in schools and colleges	Yes
All-gender bathroom facilities access protection	Yes (Since 2023)
Both surrogacy and IVF available for same-sex couples	Yes
MSMs allowed to donate blood	Yes (Since 2023 – on the condition of being monogamous)

== See also ==
- Politics of Colorado
- LGBTQ rights in the United States
- Same-sex marriage in the Tenth Circuit
