= Joshua A. Newville =

American lawyer

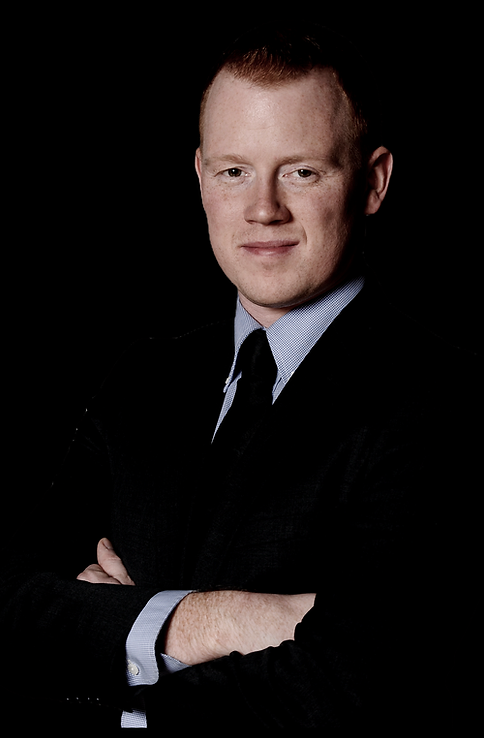
- Born: August 9, 1984 (age 41)
- Occupation: Attorney
- Known for: Civil rights litigation, Podcasting

Joshua A. Newville, known as simply Josh Newville (born August 9, 1984), is an American attorney, mediator, adjunct law professor, and investigative podcaster. He owns Newville PLC, a Minneapolis, MN-based law firm that focuses on employment law, civil rights and mediation.

== Education ==
Newville earned his J.D., cum laude, from University of Minnesota Law School and his B.A. in Political Science from the University of Minnesota.

== Same-sex Marriage Litigation ==
In 2014, Newville gained national attention for taking on the last two unchallenged state bans on same-sex marriage in the United States.

On May 22, 2014, Newville filed a federal lawsuit, Rosenbrahn v. Daugaard, on behalf of six same-sex couples against South Dakota officials, seeking the right to marry and recognition of marriages performed in other jurisdictions.

On June 6, 2014, Newville filed a similar lawsuit, Ramsay v. Dalrymple, on behalf of seven same-sex couples in North Dakota.

U.S. District Court Judge Karen Schreier heard arguments in Rosenbrahn v. Daugaard on October 17, 2014. The state defendants argued she was bound by the United States Court of Appeals for the Eighth Circuit's decision in Citizens for Equal Protection v. Bruning (2006), which Newville argued did not address the questions the plaintiffs raised in his case. On November 14, Judge Schreier denied the defense's motion to dismiss. She found that the U.S. Supreme Court's decision in Baker V Nelson was no longer valid precedent and that Bruning did not address due process or the question of a fundamental right to marry. She dismissed the plaintiffs' claim that South Dakota violated their right to travel. She set a briefing schedule to conclude December 8.

On January 12, 2015, U.S. District Court Judge Karen Schreier granted Newville's motion for summary judgment in Rosenbrahn v. Daugaard, striking down South Dakota's ban on same-sex marriage but putting a stay on her order until appeals were exhausted. South Dakota Attorney General Marty Jackley immediately announced that he would appeal the decision to the United States Court of Appeals for the Eighth Circuit. The Court of Appeals later affirmed Judge Schreier's opinion following Obergefell v Hodges.

After the first same-sex marriage licenses were issued in South Dakota on June 26, 2015, Newville told reporters that he was ecstatic for his clients and as a gay man himself.

On June 29, 2015, the U.S. District Court in North Dakota issued an order in Ramsay v. Dalrymple holding that North Dakota’s ban on same-sex marriage was unconstitutional.

== Other Notable Civil Rights Cases ==
In 2016, Newville represented a whistleblower and helped the government recover $6.2M in a Medicare fraud case. Newville's client was awarded more than $1.2 million.

In 2017, Newville won a case at the Minnesota Supreme Court that clarified that undocumented workers are entitled to protection under a Minnesota law that prohibits retaliatory employment discharge.

In 2021, Newville won summary judgment for a police shooting victim against the Las Vegas Metropolitan Police Department. After U.S. District Court Judge Richard F. Boulware found in favor of Newville's client, the case settled for $525,000.

In 2023, Newville won an Equal Rights case at the State of Wisconsin Labor & Industry Review Commission that clarified the standard in criminal record employment discrimination cases in Wisconsin.

== Missing Persons Podcast ==
Newville hosts an investigative podcast about missing persons. The first season debuted in 2022 and uncovered new leads in the 2002 disappearance of 20-year-old college student Joshua Guimond from College of Saint Benedict and Saint John's University.
