= 2006 South Dakota Amendment C =

Amendment C
- November 7, 2006
- South Dakota Marriage Definition Amendment

Results
Choice	Votes	%
Yes	172,305	51.83%
No	160,152	48.17%
Valid votes	332,457	97.46%
Invalid or blank votes	8,648	2.54%
Total votes	341,105	100.00%
Registered voters/turnout	507,132	65.56%
County results
Yes
70–80%
60–70%
50–60%
No
60–70%
50–60%

South Dakota Amendment C of 2006 is an amendment to the South Dakota Constitution to make it unconstitutional for the state to recognize or perform same-sex marriages, or to recognize civil unions, domestic partnerships, or other quasi-marital relationships regardless of gender. The referendum was approved on 7 November 2006 by 52% of the state's voters.

The text of the adopted amendment states:

Only marriage between a man and a woman shall be valid or recognized in South Dakota. The uniting of two or more persons in a civil union, domestic partnership, or other quasi-marital relationship shall not be valid or recognized in South Dakota.

The amendment was rendered void by Obergefell v. Hodges, a US Supreme Court decision that legalized same-sex marriage nationwide.

== Legislative history ==
On January 24, 2005, the South Dakota House of Representatives passed, by a vote of 53 in favor and 16 against, South Dakota House Joint Resolution 1001 (SD HJR 1001). On February 14, 2005, the South Dakota Senate passed, by a vote of 20 in favor and 15 against, HJR 1001, which put it on the ballot for the 2006 general election.

== Results ==
On November 7, 2006, at 7:00 PM CT, polls closed thought the entire state of South Dakota. Between 9:00 PM and 11:00 PM CST, Amendment C was projected to pass.

== Pre-decision opinion polls ==
Date of opinion poll	Conducted by	Sample size	In favor	Against	Undecided	Margin	Margin of Error	Source
Late October 2006	Zogby Poll	?	50%	45%	5%	5% pro	?	
October 2006	KELO-TV / Argus Leader Poll	?	51%	42%	7%	9% pro	?	
2006	Argus Leader Poll	?	46%	47%	?	1% con	?	
2006	?	?	41%	49%	?	8% con	?	

== See also ==
- LGBT rights in South Dakota
