= State v. Whitmarsh =

Case before the supreme court of South Dakota

- Court: South Dakota Supreme Court
- Full case name: State v. Whitmarsh
- Decided: November 18, 1910

Case history
- Prior history: Judgment for defendant (Beadle County Circuit Court 1909)
- Subsequent history: None

Holding
- Fellatio classifies as a crime against nature by extension of the federal common law definition of sodomy.

Case opinions
- Majority: McCoy, joined by unanimous

Laws applied
- Rev. Pen. Code § 799, SD Pen. Code § 351

State v. Whitmarsh was a South Dakota Supreme Court case decided on November 18, 1910, which asked whether or not fellatio, or oral sex, should be classified as sodomy. The contemporary federal common law definition of sodomy did not include fellatio. The court ruled that fellatio was an "abominable and disgusting" crime against nature and outlawed it between any two persons, regardless of marital status, sexual orientation or age. The case set a precedent for other states' laws and remained in effect in South Dakota for the next 66 years, until all sodomy laws, including the "crime against nature" statute, were abolished by the South Dakota Legislature in 1976.

== Background ==
Louis Whitmarsh, the appellant, was charged by the Beadle County Circuit Court for assault on a 6-year-old boy, whom he "willingly, unlawfully, and feloniously assaulted" with intent to force oral sex upon, under violation of South Dakota Penal Code § 351. Lyman T. Boucher was the judge presiding over this case. On February 1, 1909, the court found Whitmarsh guilty and sentenced him to three years imprisonment in the South Dakota State Penitentiary.

Whitmarsh submitted an appeal and requested a retrial, but he was denied and subsequently filed several complaints against the court. Whitmarsh argued that the state attorney planned to charge him with the crime of sodomy, rather than "assault with intent." He also complained that the evidence against him was "incompetent, immaterial, and not proper cross-examination," and that the court would not let one of his witnesses testify to a certain question. Finally, Whitmarsh complained of the length of his punishment, which would have illegally expired in winter, as forbidden by Rev. Penal Code § 799. The state subsequently dismissed all complaints on grounds including lack of evidence and misinterpretation by the appellant of the law.

Whitmarsh was represented by C. A. Kelley and James Byrnes, while South Dakota was represented by Attorney General S. W. Clark and State Attorney O. S. Hagen. The question brought before the court was whether or not South Dakota's "crimes against nature" statute included fellatio.

== Decision ==
The case was decided and the opinion filed on November 18, 1910. The decision was unanimous in favor of the state of South Dakota and upheld Whitmarsh's sentence. J. Whiting wrote the opinion for the court.

Among the cases cited by the court were State v. Vicknair, which was settled in Louisiana. As in the Vicknair decision, the South Dakota Supreme Court questioned why "the use of the mouth should not have been considered as much against nature as though the act were committed per anum." By extension, the state court considered fellatio an "unusual form" of sodomy, and compared it thusly:

What would we think of the reasoning of a court that should hold that the killing of a human being in some peculiar and practically unheard of manner was not murder simply because such killing was committed in an unusual way? It would certainly be as sensible as to say that sodomy is not sodomy when committed in an unusual was of committing sodomy.

Similar cases cited and considered were Rex v. Jacobs, Pringle v. State, People v. Boyle, Kinnan v. State, Davis v. Brown, Estes v. Iowa, Ausman v. Veal, and Commonwealth v. Poindexter, which either upheld that only acts defined by common law could be considered sodomy or did not explicitly state which acts should be considered sodomy. The South Dakota Supreme Court, considering what they referred to as the "unusual" nature of their case, searched for language that did not include the word sodomy but found none that did not simply uphold previous definitions using different language. As such, the court had no established precedent for its ruling. Instead, the court cited an Illinois statute, applied in Honselman v. People, which included the phrase "crime against nature" instead of the word "sodomy." The language of this case separated the two terms and defined them as similar but not interchangeable; since acts constituting sodomy had already been defined, the court chose to apply the phrase "crime against nature" to "any bestial [sic] or unnatural copulation that can be conceived."

The opinion closed with a quote from Herring v. State, a similar case tried in Georgia, which reflected the South Dakota Supreme Court's final decision:

After much reflection, we are satisfied that, if the baser form of the abominable and disgusting crime against nature—i.e., by the mouth—had prevailed in the days of the early law, the courts of England could well have held that the form of the offense was included in the current definition of the crime of sodomy. And no satisfactory reason occurs to us why the lesser form of this crime against nature should be covered by our statute, and the greater excluded, when both are committed in a like unnatural manner, and when either might well be spoken of and understood as being 'the abominable crime not fit to be named among Christians.'

— Georgia Supreme Court, Herring v. State

== Influence ==
Like Herring v. State, State v. Whitmarsh became one of the first U.S. court cases to challenge the common law definition of sodomy and to define an act as such that was not previously outlined in its common law definition, and to uphold a difference in meaning between sodomy and a crime against nature. The state's opinion was published in detail in the North Western Reporter.

The case ruling was subsequently quoted by the Indiana Supreme Court in Glover v. State, which argued whether or not an act could be considered sodomy or a crime against nature if not specified by common law; and by the Nevada Supreme Court In Re Benites.

== See also ==
- LGBT history in South Dakota
- Sodomy laws in the United States
