= Timeline of same-sex marriage in the United States =

This article contains a timeline of significant events regarding same-sex marriage in the United States. On June 26, 2015, the landmark US Supreme Court decision in Obergefell v. Hodges effectively ended restrictions on same-sex marriage in the United States.

== Pre-1950s ==
=== 1886 ===
- In Grand Rapids, Michigan, male impersonator Annie Hindle married her dresser Annie Ryan while on a tour through the mid-west. Hindle dressed in male clothing and gave her name as Charles and a local Baptist minister performed the ceremony.

== 1950s ==
=== 1953 ===
- August: Shipment of the August 1953 issue of ONE magazine, with the cover story "Homosexual Marriage?", is delayed by U.S Post Office officials for three weeks while they try to determine whether its contents are obscene.

=== 1958 ===
- January 13, 1958: In One, Inc. v. Olesen, the United States Supreme Court rules that homosexual writings cannot be banned from mailing under the guise of obscenity.

== 1960s ==
=== 1964 ===
- A woman in Jess Stearn's popular non-fiction work The Grapevine: A Report on the Secret World of the Lesbian explains that she congratulated two men on their wedding because "Having no status in the law of the land...the homosexual marriage must be maintained only through mutual love and devotion of those involved."

=== 1966 ===
- Publishers Weekly reports that Jean Genet's The Miracle of the Rose "delicately describes a secret homosexual marriage".

=== 1967 ===
- December 3: Theologians who object to acceptance of homosexual relationships are reported to be "dubious about how 'fulfilling' even a lasting homosexual relationship can be and point out that a homosexual 'marriage' lacks the discipline and formal commitment of legal sanctions".

=== 1968 ===
- December 22: A report in the New York Times says the plot of Spitting Image, a play scheduled for Off Broadway in February, involves "a pair of homosexuals who marry and have a baby". It calls the premise "farcical" and an "outrageous charade".

== 1970s ==
History of same-sex marriage legal status, 1971-2015, with influential legal decisions. Plot shows proportion of US states and the District of Columbia with: historical/traditional definition of marriage (gray); legislation enacted to ban same-sex marriage (blue); constitutional bans on same-sex marriage (yellow, includes states that also have legislative ban); statewide legal same-sex marriage (green). Red bar shows period in which DOMA prohibited federal recognition of same-sex marriages.

=== 1970 ===
The modern gay movement for PRIDE and marriage equality in the United States began on the Minneapolis campus (U of M) of the University of Minnesota. James Michael McConnell, librarian, and Richard John Baker, law student, applied for a marriage license. Gerald R. Nelson, Clerk of District Court, denied the license because both applicants were men.

- Baker sued Nelson, insisting that the license was not forbidden.
- Courts were not persuaded.

=== 1971 ===
- January 26: Look magazine devotes three pages of its cover story "The American Family" to a gay couple, Jack Baker and Michael McConnell.
- June 4: Members of the Gay Activists Alliance demand marriage rights for same-sex couples at New York City's Marriage License Bureau.
- Jack Baker and Michael McConnell apply and are granted a marriage license in Blue Earth County, Minnesota after discovering the county has no laws prohibiting same sex marriage. Therefore on September 3, 1971 both men became the first legally married same sex couple in US and modern recorded history.
- October 15: The Minnesota Supreme Court rules in Baker v. Nelson that the state's statute limiting marriage to different-sex couples does not violate the U.S. Constitution. However this ruling did not invalidate the 1971 license in Blue Earth County

=== 1972 ===
- The National Coalition of Gay Organizations calls for the repeal of all statutes that limit marriage to different-sex couples and for extending the legal benefits of marriage to all cohabiting couples.
- March 21: Senator Birch Bayh of Indiana, principal sponsor of the Equal Rights Amendment, defends it against critics who contend it would require states to permit same-sex marriages: "All it says is that if a state legislature makes a judgment that it is wrong for a man to marry a man, then it must say that it is wrong for a woman to marry a woman".
- October 10: The United States Supreme Court dismisses appeal in Baker v. Nelson, a decision that refused to invalidate Minnesota's restriction of marriage to different-sex couples, "for want of a substantial federal question."
  - Until 26 June 2015, dismissal of the appeal challenging the Minnesota opinion was treated as a binding precedent. Thus, lower federal courts could not offer a contrary conclusion when presented with the precise issue "necessarily decided" by the Court.
  - Because Hennepin County had argued that the marriage license issued previously in Blue Earth County rendered this case Moot, the "precise issue" necessarily decided by the Court may not have been the inherent right of gay citizens to marry the adult of one's choice.

=== 1973 ===
- January: The Yale Law Journal publishes an unsigned article, "The Legality of Homosexual Marriage", which argues that "[a] credible case can be made that the denial of marriage licenses to all homosexual couples violates the Equal Protection Clause of the Fourteenth Amendment" and that the proposed Equal Rights Amendment would make such a claim irrefutable.
- July 1: Maryland bans same-sex marriage, the first state to enact such a statute.
- November 9: The Kentucky Court of Appeals rules in Jones v. Hallahan that two women were properly denied a marriage license based on dictionary definitions of marriage, despite the fact that state statutes do not restrict marriage to a female-male couple.

=== 1974 ===
- May 2: The Public Broadcasting Service (PBS) airs an installment of its one-hour debate series The Advocates that considers the question "Should Marriage Between Homosexuals Be Permitted?". Participants include Frank Kameny, Elaine Noble, and Charles Socarides.
- May 20: The Washington Court of Appeals holds in Singer v. Hara that the state's statute banning same-sex marriage does not violate the state constitution and raises no federal issues.

=== 1975 ===
- March 26 – April 22: In Colorado, the Boulder County Clerk, Clela Rorex, issues marriage licenses to 6 same-sex couples after receiving a favorable opinion from an assistant district attorney. When one of those married in Boulder tried to use it to sponsor his husband for immigration purposes, he lost his case, Adams v. Howerton, years later in federal court.
- Virginia enacts a statute that says "A marriage between persons of the same sex is prohibited."

=== 1977 ===
- June 8: Governor Reubin Askew signs legislation banning same-sex marriage in Florida.
- August 18: Governor Jerry Brown signs legislation banning same-sex marriage in California.
- Wyoming bans same-sex marriage by statute.

== 1980s ==
=== 1980 ===
- March: The Church of Jesus Christ of Latter-day Saints opposes to the Equal Rights Amendment in part because its passage "could extend legal protection to same-sex lesbian and homosexual marriages", citing the arguments made by Paul A. Freund of Harvard Law School before the Senate Judiciary Committee.

=== 1982 ===
- February 25: The Ninth Circuit Court of Appeals, deciding Adams v. Howerton, holds that for immigration purposes Congress intended its use of the words marriage and spouse to have their "ordinary meaning" which "contemplates a relationship between a man and a woman".
- May: San Francisco Board of Supervisors passes Harry Britt's measure to extend health insurance coverage to same-sex domestic partners of public employees, largely because of the reaction to the early days of AIDS, but does not provide for a registry available to the general public. Mayor Dianne Feinstein vetoes the measure.

=== 1984 ===
- May 11: A three-judge panel of the Superior Court of Pennsylvania rules in De Santo v. Barnsley that a same-sex couple cannot contract a common law marriage: "the limits of common law marriage must be defined in light of the limits of statutory marriage."
- The Unitarian Universalist Association endorses "services of union" for same-sex couples.
- 4 December: The Berkeley City Council passes a domestic partnership policy to offer insurance benefits to city employees in same-sex relationships, which made Berkeley the first city in the U.S. to do so. Among the people who fought for the approval of the policy was Tom Brougham, a Berkeley city employee who coined the term "domestic partner" and created the concept in a letter sent to the Berkeley City Council a few years earlier.

=== 1985 ===
- 25 March: Newly incorporated city of West Hollywood becomes the first US city to enact a domestic partnership registry open to all its citizens.

=== 1987 ===
- New Hampshire bans same-sex marriage by statute.

=== 1989 ===
- 30 May: San Francisco Board of Supervisors passes a domestic partnership registry ordinance, which is closely defeated by San Francisco voters as Proposition S on 7 November.
- Andrew Sullivan's essay "Here Comes the Groom: A (Conservative) Case for Gay Marriage" appears in the New Republic.

== 1990s ==
=== 1991 ===
- California Assemblyman John L. Burton, D-San Francisco, proposed Assembly Bill 167 that would have changed the state civil marriage code to permit same-sex marriages.
- June: Berkeley becomes the third city in California to create a domestic partnership registry for same- and opposite-sex couples.
- October: Fox Broadcasting Company airs the first same-sex wedding on national television in the episode "Can't Help Loving That Man" of its sitcom Roc.

=== 1993 ===
- May 5: The Supreme Court of Hawaii sends the case of Baehr v. Miike to a trial court after ruling that the state same-sex marriage ban was presumed to be unconstitutional and that the State would need to demonstrate a compelling interest in denying same-sex couples the right to marry.
- The Conference of Bishops of the Evangelical Lutheran Church in America write in a pastoral letter that they find no scriptural basis for blessing same-sex unions.
- December: In A Place at the Table, Bruce Bawer argues for the legal and religious recognition of same-sex relationships as marriages, arguing for what he calls the "silent majority" of non-radicals like himself and criticizing the gay community's identification of homosexuality with sexual behavior.

=== 1994 ===
- September: Governor Pete Wilson from California vetoes a bill that would have legalized domestic partnerships in the state.

=== 1995 ===
- January 19: The District of Columbia Court of Appeals ruling in Dean v. District of Columbia upholds the denial of a marriage license to two men.

=== 1996 ===
- 21 September: As a direct result of the Baehr v. Lewin ruling of 1993, President Bill Clinton signs the Defense of Marriage Act (DOMA) into law, which banned the federal Government from recognizing same-sex unions.
- December 3: A Hawaii trial court holds that no compelling interests support Hawaii's statute limiting marriage to opposite-sex couples. The decision is stayed pending review by the Supreme Court of Hawaii.
- The Unitarian Universalist Association adopts a resolution calling for full marriage equality for same-sex couples
- At its General Convention, the United Methodist Church, which in 1972 said that "the practice of homosexuality [is] incompatible with Christian teaching", votes 553 to 321 to adopt a rule that "Ceremonies that celebrate homosexual unions shall not be conducted by our ministers and shall not be conducted in our churches."

=== 1997 ===
- June 3: Minnesota bans same-sex marriage by statute and prohibits the recognition of same-sex marriages legalized elsewhere.
- November 2: The Union of American Hebrew Congregations calls for legislation to allow gays and lesbians access to civil marriage and supports efforts to consider a religious ceremony to celebrate such marriages.
- As a direct result of the Baehr v. Lewin ruling of 1993, Hawaii passes a law to establish Reciprocal beneficiary relationships, which made Hawaii the first state in the country to offer statewide recognition for same-sex couples.

=== 1998 ===
- February 27: In Brause v. Bureau of Vital Statistics, an Alaska court orders the state to show it has a compelling reason for prohibiting same-sex couples from marrying.
- November 3: Hawaii voters pass a constitutional amendment to give the Hawaii State Legislature the power to reserve marriage to different-sex couples, while voters in Alaska approve a state constitutional amendment defining marriage as the union of one man and one woman.

=== 1999 ===
- 22 September: Governor Gray Davis from California signs a domestic partnerships bill into law that provided limited rights for same-sex couples, which made California the first state in the country to have a statewide domestic partnership scheme and the second to provide a registry for same-sex couples after Hawaii.
- December 9: The Supreme Court of Hawaii in Baehr v. Miike upholds the state's ban on same-sex marriage.
- December 20: The Vermont Supreme Court holds in Baker v. Vermont that excluding same-sex couples from marriage violates the Vermont Constitution and orders the legislature to establish same-sex marriage or an equivalent status.

== 2000s ==
=== 2000 ===
- March 7: California voters approve Proposition 22, adding the statement "Only marriage between a man and a woman is valid or recognized in California" to the state's statutes.
- 26 April: Governor Howard Dean from Vermont signs a civil unions bill in response to the ruling of Baker v. Vermont, thus making Vermont the first state in the U.S. to give civil union rights to same-sex couples. It became law on 1 July.
- November 7: Voters in Nebraska approve a constitutional amendment defining marriage as the union of one man and one woman.

=== 2002 ===
- May 15: Rep. Ronnie Shows (D-MS) introduces the Federal Marriage Amendment, a law to amend the U.S. Constitution to define marriage as the union of a man and a woman and to prevent the extension of the rights of marriage to unmarried persons.
- November 5: Voters in Nevada approve a state constitutional amendment defining marriage as the union of one man and one woman.

=== 2003 ===
- 18 November: The Supreme Judicial Court of Massachusetts rules in Goodridge v. Department of Public Health that same-sex couples have the right to marry, setting the start date for the ruling to come into effect on 17 May 2004, to allow the legislature six months to modify state law if it chooses to.

=== 2004 ===
- 12 January: The Legislature of New Jersey passes a registered partnerships bill. It came into effect on 10 July.
- February 4: The Massachusetts Supreme Judicial Court, responding to a query from the state Senate, issues an opinion that same-sex couples must be allowed to marry and that a designation like civil union constitutes discrimination.
- February 12 – March 11: San Francisco issues marriage licenses to same-sex couples.
- February 20: A clerk in Sandoval County, New Mexico, issues licenses to same-sex couples until state Attorney General Patricia Madrid issues an opinion stating that the licenses are "invalid under state law".
- February 25: President George W. Bush calls for a constitutional amendment "defining and protecting marriage as a union of a man and woman as husband and wife."
- February 27: Several same-sex couples are wed in New Paltz, New York. The marriages are later invalidated.
- March 5–9: A clerk in Asbury Park, New Jersey, processes several marriage licenses for same-sex couples until warned by the state attorney general to stop. A deputy mayor officiates at the marriage of one couple on March 8.
- March 3: Multnomah County, Oregon, issues marriage licenses to same-sex couples.
- April: The U.S. state of Maine adopts a registered partnerships bill. The law came into effect on 30 July.
- April 20: An Oregon state judge orders Multnomah County to stop issuing same-sex marriage licenses, declares the 3,000 issued since March 3 valid, and orders the state legislature to create an equivalent of marriage for same-sex couples.
- May 17: Same-sex marriage starts in Massachusetts.
- August 3: Voters in Missouri approve a state constitutional amendment defining marriage as the union of one man and one woman.
- August 4: A King County Superior Court judge finds for the plaintiffs in a challenge to the state's Defense of Marriage Act in Andersen v. King County, becoming the first trial judge in the country to rule a state DOMA unconstitutional; the ruling is stayed pending appeal.
- August 12: The California Supreme Court rules that the same-sex marriages performed in San Francisco in February and March are void.
- September 18: Voters in Louisiana approve a state constitutional amendment defining marriage as the union of one man and one woman.
- November 2: Voters in Arkansas, Georgia, Kentucky, Michigan, Mississippi, Montana, North Dakota, Ohio, Oklahoma, Oregon, and Utah approve state constitutional amendments defining marriage as the union of one man and one woman.

=== 2005 ===
- January 20: An Indiana appeals court upholds the constitutionality of the state's statute defining marriage as the union of a man and a woman. The plaintiffs do not appeal to the state supreme court.
- April 5: Kansas voters approve a state constitutional amendment defining marriage as the union of one man and one woman.
- April 14: Oregon's highest court rules in Li & Kennedy v. State of Oregon that the 3,000 same-sex marriages performed in the state in March and April 2004 were never valid.
- April 20: Governor Jodi Rell of Connecticut signs a same-sex civil unions bill into law after passing the State Senate 26 to 8 earlier that day. The bill was previously approved on 13 April by the State House of Representatives in an 85–63 vote. It came into effect on 1 October.
- May 12: U.S. District Judge Joseph Bataillon rules in Citizens for Equal Protection v. Bruning that a constitutional amendment to the Nebraska Constitution that denies recognition of same-sex couples under any designation violates the U.S. Constitution. (His decision is overruled in 2006 by the Eighth Circuit Court of Appeals.)
- July 4: At the 25th General Synod of the United Church of Christ in Atlanta, Georgia, delegates voted to adopt the resolution, "Equal Marriage Rights for All," affirming homosexuality as compatible with Christian living and allowing for same-sex marriage ceremonies to be performed in UCC congregations. The United Church of Christ became the first major Mainline Christian body and major Christian denomination in the United States to do so.
- September 29: California Governor Arnold Schwarzenegger vetoes legislation establishing same-sex marriage.
- November 8: Voters in Texas approve a state constitutional amendment defining marriage as the union of one man and one woman.

=== 2006 ===
- June 6: Voters in Alabama approve a state constitutional amendment defining marriage as the union of one man and one woman.
- July 6: The New York Court of Appeals issues its decision in Hernández v. Robles, stating that same-sex partners do not have the right to marry under the New York Constitution.
- July 14: The Eighth Circuit Court of Appeals in Citizens for Equal Protection v. Bruning reverses a lower court's 2005 decision and rules that a Nebraska constitutional amendment that bans all recognition of same-sex relationships is not unconstitutional.
- October 25: The New Jersey Supreme Court holds unanimously in Lewis v. Harris that excluding same-sex couples from marriage violates the state constitution's guarantee of equal protection. A majority of four justices gives the state legislature six months to amend the state's marriage laws or create civil unions.
- November 7: Voters in Colorado, Idaho, South Carolina, South Dakota, Tennessee, Virginia, and Wisconsin approve state constitutional amendments defining marriage as the union of one man and one woman, while voters in Arizona reject a constitutional ban on same-sex marriages and civil unions.
- 21 December: Governor Jon Corzine from New Jersey signs a bill legalizing civil unions into law. It took effect on 19 February 2007.

=== 2007 ===
- April 21: Governor Chris Gregoire from Washington signs a domestic partnerships bill into law. It came into effect on 22 July.
- May 9: Governor Ted Kulongoski from Oregon signs a domestic partnerships bill into law. It came into effect on 1 February 2008.
- May 31: Governor John Lynch from New Hampshire signs a civil unions bill into law. It came into effect on 1 January 2008.
- August 30: A court of Iowa strikes down its ban on same-sex marriage as a result of a legal challenge. About 20 couples obtained marriage licenses and one couple married before the judge issued a stay of his ruling pending appeal.
- September 18: Maryland's highest court decides Conaway v. Deane, rejecting a challenge to the state's prohibition on same-sex marriage.
- October 12: California Gov. Arnold Schwarzenegger vetoes same-sex marriage legislation for the second time.

=== 2008 ===
- May 14: New York Governor David Paterson orders state agencies to recognize same-sex marriages from other jurisdictions.
- May 15: The Supreme Court of California decides In re Marriage Cases and overturns the state's ban on same-sex marriage.
- 22 May: Governor Martin O'Malley of Maryland signs into law two bills legalizing domestic partnerships. They came into effect on 1 July.
- 29 May: Governor David Paterson from New York signs an executive order mandating state agencies to recognize same-sex marriages performed out-of-state equally under the law. New York thus became the first U.S. state that did not allow same-sex marriages, but whose state agencies recognized same-sex marriages performed elsewhere.
- June 17: In California, county clerks begin issuing marriage licenses to same-sex couples.
- July 31: Massachusetts repeals its 1913 law invalidating any marriage of non-residents if the marriage is invalid in the state where they live.
- August 25: The Democratic National Convention adopts a platform that "oppose[s]the Defense of Marriage Act and all attempts to use this issue to divide us" and suggests support for same-sex marriage.
- September 1: The Republican National Convention adopts a platform that "laments that judges are ... undermining traditional marriage laws", endorses the Federal Marriage Amendment and state initiatives that support "traditional marriage", and references "the right of states not to recognize same-sex 'marriages'".
- October 10: The Supreme Court of Connecticut, in Kerrigan v. Commissioner of Public Health, rules that the state's prohibition of same-sex marriage violates the state constitution.
- November 4: Voters in Arizona, California, and Florida approve state constitutional amendments defining marriage as the union of one man and one woman.
- November 5: Proposition 8 takes effect in California, preventing the issuance of same-sex marriage licenses.
- November 12: Same-sex marriage starts in Connecticut.

=== 2009 ===
- April 3: The Iowa Supreme Court, ruling in Varnum v. Brien, holds that the state's restriction of marriage to different-sex couples violates the equal protection clause of the Iowa Constitution. All three of the states that had legalized same-sex marriage at this point—Massachusetts, Connecticut, and Iowa—had done so by court ruling.
- April 7: The Vermont General Assembly overrides Governor Jim Douglas's April 6 veto of same-sex marriage legislation, making it the first state to institute same-sex marriage by statute.
- April 23: Connecticut Governor Jodi Rell signs legislation converting existing civil unions into marriages effective October 1, 2010.
- April 27: Same-sex marriage starts in Iowa.
- May 6: Maine Governor John Baldacci signs the marriage equality law, the first governor in the U.S. to sign such legislation.
- May 18: Governor Chris Gregoire from Washington signs a so-called "everything-but-marriage" registered partnerships bill into law. It was passed by the State Senate on 10 March and by the House of Representatives on 15 April. However, opponents organized a referendum that took place on 3 November.
- May 26: The California Supreme Court, ruling in Strauss v. Horton, upholds Proposition 8's ban on same-sex marriage and holds that same-sex marriages performed before its passage remain valid.
- May 31: The Assembly of the U.S. state of Nevada legalizes domestic partnerships by a 28–14 vote, overriding a veto from Governor Jim Gibbons after the Senate did the same on 30 May by a 14–7 vote. The law came into effect on 1 October.
- June 3: New Hampshire Gov. John Lynch signs legislation legalizing same-sex marriage.
- June 29: Governor Jim Doyle from Wisconsin signs into law a bill legalizing registered partnerships. The bill was previously approved by the State Assembly in a 50–48 vote on 13 June and by the State Senate in a 17–16 vote on 17 June. The law came into effect on 3 August.
- July 1: The U.S. state of Colorado begins recognizing designated beneficiary agreements.
- July 6: The District of Columbia starts recognizing same-sex marriages performed in other U.S. states, although same-sex marriages cannot be performed in D.C. itself.
- July 17: The General Convention of the Episcopal Church approves a resolution calling for the development of a rite for blessing same-sex unions and allowing bishops where unions are legal to use their own judgment in blessing such unions until the rite becomes available.
- August 21: The Evangelical Lutheran Church in America votes by a 559-441 margin to allow non-celibate gay and lesbian pastors in committed, monogamous relationships to be ordained to pastoral office. It also allows, but not requires, for ELCA pastors to perform blessings on same-sex weddings. It becomes the second Mainline denomination to do so.
- September 1: Vermont's statute authorizing same-sex marriages takes effect.
- September 15: A group of Democratic members of the House of Representatives led by Jerrold Nadler, Tammy Baldwin, and Jared Polis introduce the Respect for Marriage Act, which would repeal the Defense of Marriage Act.
- October 2: A Texas judge rules the state's same-sex marriage ban unconstitutional while presiding over the divorce proceedings for two gay Texans married in Massachusetts.
- October 11: California Gov. Arnold Schwarzenegger signs legislation establishing the recognition of same-sex marriages performed elsewhere.
- November 3: A voter referendum repeals Maine's same-sex marriage law, preventing it from going into effect. While a referendum in Washington upholds the so-called "everything-but-marriage" registered partnerships bill, which came into effect on 3 December.
- December 18: District of Columbia Mayor Adrian Fenty signs a same-sex marriage bill into law. The bill was previously approved by the D.C. Council on 15 December. It came into effect on 3 March 2010.
- Marlon Reis, The husband of Representative Jared Polis, a Colorado Democrat, acquires a Congressional spouse ID, though he is later told he should have been issued a "designee ID", the style given to unmarried partners of members of Congress.

== 2010s ==
=== 2010 ===
- January 1: In California, all out-of-state same-sex marriages are given the benefits of marriage, although only those performed before November 5, 2008, are granted the designation "marriage".
- January 1: New Hampshire's statute authorizing same-sex marriages takes effect.
- February 24: Maryland Attorney General Doug Gansler issues a legal opinion stating that state agencies could begin to recognize same-sex marriages performed in other states, under the principle of comity.
- March 3: Washington, D.C.'s statute authorizing same-sex marriages takes effect.
- April 1: The 2010 United States census becomes the first to track same-sex-led households, both married and unmarried.
- July 8: Judge Joseph Tauro of the U.S. District Court of Massachusetts holds in two related cases (Gill v. Office of Personnel Management and Massachusetts v. United States Department of Health and Human Services) that the denial of federal rights and benefits to lawfully married same-sex couples in Massachusetts under section 3 of the DOMA is unconstitutional.
- August 4: U.S. District Judge Vaughn R. Walker rules in Perry v. Schwarzenegger that California's Proposition 8 is an unconstitutional violation of the Fourteenth Amendment's Due Process and Equal Protection clauses.
- August 31: The Fifth Court of Appeals in Dallas, Texas, reverses a 2009 ruling in a same-sex divorce case, ruling that the Texas constitutional ban on same-sex marriage does not violate the Equal Protection Clause of the Fourteenth Amendment. The court further rules that district courts in Texas do not have subject-matter jurisdiction to hear a same-sex divorce case.
- November 2: In judicial retention elections, Iowa voters remove three Iowa Supreme Court justices who joined the ruling that invalidated the state's ban on same-sex marriage in 2009.

=== 2011 ===
- January 31: Governor Pat Quinn from Illinois signs a civil unions bill into law. The bill was previously approved 32–24 by the state Senate on 1 December and 61–52 by the state House of Representatives on 30 November. It came into effect on 1 June.
- February 23: Governor Neil Abercrombie from Hawaii signs a civil unions bill into law. The bill was previously approved 18–5 by the state Senate on 16 February and 31–19 by the state House of Representatives on 11 February. It came into effect on 1 January 2012.
- February 23: The Obama Administration announces its determination that discrimination based on sexual orientation is subject to heightened scrutiny and when judged by that standard section 3 of DOMA is unconstitutional. It will continue to enforce DOMA's provisions, will no longer defend challenges to the constitutionality of section 3 of DOMA in court, and will cooperate if Congress seeks to defend the statute in court.
- March 4: Speaker of the House John Boehner launches effort to defend DOMA's constitutionality in court by convening the Bipartisan Legal Advisory Group (BLAG), tasked with "initiating action by the House to defend this law."
- May 11: Governor Jack Markell from the US state of Delaware signs a civil unions bill into law. The bill was previously approved 26–15 by the state House of Representatives on 14 April and 13–6 by the state Senate on 7 April. It came into effect on 1 January 2012.
- June 24: Governor Andrew Cuomo from New York signs a same-sex marriage bill into law. The bill was previously approved two hours early 33–29 by the state Senate and 80–63 by the state Assembly on 5 June. It came into effect on 24 July.
- July 1: A civil unions bill in the US state of Rhode Island becomes effective, Independent Governor Lincoln Chafee signed the bill on 2 July 2011 but the law was made retroactive from 1 July 2011. The bill was previously approved 21–16 by the state Senate on 29 June and by the Assembly in a 62–11 vote on 20 May.
- July 24: New York's statute authorizing same-sex marriages takes effect.
- August 1: Washington state's Native American Suquamish tribe approves granting same-sex marriages.
- September 20: Navy Lt. Gary C. Ross becomes the first active member of the U.S. military to legally marry a same-sex partner moments after the repeal of the military's "don't ask don't tell" policy takes effect.

=== 2012 ===
- February 7: The Ninth Circuit Court of Appeals affirms district court Judge Vaughn Walker's decision in Perry that overturned California Proposition 8.
- February 13: Governor Christine Gregoire of Washington signs a same-sex marriage bill into law. The bill was priorly approved 55–43 by the state House on 8 February and 28–21 by the state Senate on 1 February. However, opponents organized a referendum that took place on 6 November.
- February 17: New Jersey Governor Chris Christie vetoes a bill to legalize same-sex marriage.
- February 22: Judge Jeffrey White rules section 3 of the Defense of Marriage Act unconstitutional in Golinski v. Office of Personnel Management.
- March 1: Governor Martin O'Malley from Maryland signs a same-sex marriage bill into law. The bill was previously approved by the Senate, 25–22, on 23 February and by the House, 72–67, on 17 February. However, opponents organized a referendum that took place on 6 November.
- March 21: The New Hampshire House of Representatives rejects the repeal of the state's 2009 same-sex marriage law.
- May 8: Voters in North Carolina approve North Carolina Amendment 1, defining marriage as the union of a man and a woman and prohibiting the recognition of any type of same-sex union in that state. This would be the very last time a voter-approved ban on same-sex marriage would pass.
- May 9: President Barack Obama becomes the first sitting U.S. president to declare his support for legalizing same-sex marriage.
- May 14: Governor Lincoln Chafee of Rhode Island signs an executive order directing state agencies to treat same-sex marriages performed out-of-state in the same manner as those of different-sex couples.
- May 18: The Maryland Court of Appeals rules unanimously in Port v. Cowan that same-sex marriages established in other states are valid.
- May 31: A unanimous three-judge panel of the First Circuit Court of Appeals upholds the decisions in Gill and Massachusetts that found section 3 of DOMA unconstitutional.
- May 31: The Conservative branch of American Judaism approves same-sex marriage ceremonies, offering two model wedding ceremonies and guidelines for a same-sex divorce.
- June 6: Judge Barbara Jones of the District Court for the Southern District of New York finds section 3 of DOMA unconstitutional in Windsor v. United States.
- June 23: The first same-sex marriage on a U.S. military base is celebrated in the chapel at Joint Base McGuire-Dix-Lakehurst in New Jersey.
- July 6: The General Assembly of the Presbyterian Church defeats 52% to 48% a proposal to define marriage as "a covenant between two people" instead of "a civil contract between a woman and a man". It endorses a two-year study of the theology of marriage.
- July 7: Representative Barney Frank of Massachusetts becomes the first member of Congress to enter into a same-sex marriage.
- July 10: The Episcopal Church approves a rite for blessing same-sex unions. It can be used subject to the approval of the local bishop without respect to the legal status of such unions.
- July 26: Massachusetts' highest court rules in Elia-Warnken v. Elia that the state recognizes a same-sex civil union established in a different jurisdiction as the legal equivalent of a marriage.
- July 31: Judge Vanessa L. Bryant of the U.S. District Court in Connecticut holds in Pedersen v. Office of Personnel Management that section 3 of DOMA is unconstitutional.
- August 8: A federal court in Hawaii rejects a challenge to the state's ban on same-sex marriage, Jackson v. Abercrombie.
- August 28: The Republican National Convention approves a platform that asserts right of the federal government and each state to deny legal recognition to same-sex marriages and endorses a constitutional amendment defining marriage as the union of one man and one woman.
- September 5: The Democratic National Convention adopts a political platform that supports marriage equality for the first time in its history and opposes all constitutional amendments that would exclude same-sex couples from marriage.
- September 12: The Massachusetts Supreme Judicial Court rules that domestic partnerships established in other jurisdictions are recognized "as equivalent to marriage".
- October 18: In Windsor v. United States, the Second Circuit Court of Appeals rules Section 3 of the Defense of Marriage Act (DOMA) as unconstitutional, holding sexual orientation to be a quasi-suspect classification, and determining that laws that classify people on such basis should be subject to intermediate scrutiny.
- November 6: Voters in Maine, Maryland, and Washington become the first in history to approve legislation establishing same-sex marriage, while voters in Minnesota defeat a state constitutional amendment that would have defined marriage as "a union of one man and one woman."
- November 29: U.S. District Court Judge Robert C. Jones rules in Sevcik v. Sandoval that Nevada's denial of marriage rights to same-sex couples does not violate the Equal Protection Clause of the U.S. Constitution.
- December 6: The state of Washington's statute authorizing same-sex marriage takes effect.
- December 7: The Supreme Court grants review of United States v. Windsor, formerly Windsor v. United States, and Hollingsworth v. Perry, formerly Perry v. Brown.
- December 29: Maine's statute authorizing same-sex marriages takes effect.

=== 2013 ===
- January 1: Maryland's statute authorizing same-sex marriages takes effect.
- March 9: The Pokagon Band of Potawatomi Indians announces recognition for same-sex marriages, entering into force 60 days later on 8 May.
- March 15: The Tribal chairman of the Little Traverse Bay Bands of Odawa Indians in the U.S. state of Michigan signs a same-sex marriage amendment into law that had been previously approved by the Tribal Council in a 5–4 vote on 3 March.
- March 21: Governor John Hickenlooper from Colorado signs a civil unions bill into law. The bill was previously approved by the House of Representatives on 12 March in a 39–26 vote and by the Senate in a 21–14 vote on 11 February. It came into effect on 1 May.
- April 26: U.S. Judge Harry Pregerson issues an administrative ruling as Chair of the Federal Public Defenders Standing Committee that Oregon's ban on same-sex marriage and DOMA Section 3 deny equal protection to the wife of a female federal employee.
- April 26: The husband of U.S. Representative Mark Pocan, a Wisconsin Democrat, becomes the first same-sex spouse to obtain a congressional spouse identification card. The validity of a similar one given to the spouse of Representative Jared Polis in 2009 was later called a mistake.
- May 2: Governor Lincoln Chafee of Rhode Island signs a same-sex marriage bill into law. The bill was passed shortly before with a final 56–15 vote in the House of Representatives and on 24 April by the state Senate in a 26–12 vote. It came into effect on 1 August.
- May 7: Governor Jack Markell from Delaware signs a same-sex marriage bill into law. The bill was passed shortly before by the state Senate by a 12–9 vote and on 23 April by the House of Representatives by a 23–18 vote. It took effect on 1 July.
- May 14: Governor Mark Dayton from Minnesota signs a same-sex marriage bill into law. The bill was passed a day before by the state Senate by a 37–30 vote and on 9 May by the House of Representatives by a 75–59 vote. It came into effect on 1 August 2013.
- June 24: The Santa Ysabel Tribe announce their recognition of same-sex marriage, becoming the first tribe in California to do so.
- June 26: The Supreme Court issues a 5–4 decision in United States v. Windsor, ruling Section 3 of DOMA unconstitutional "as a deprivation of the equal liberty ... protected by the Fifth Amendment."
- June 26: The Supreme Court issues a 5–4 decision in Hollingsworth v. Perry, dismissing the appeal of the district court's decision on August 4, 2010, when the case was known as Perry v. Schwarzenegger, that affirmed the right of same-sex couples to marry in California.
- June 28: Following the Supreme Court's decision in Hollingsworth v. Perry, the Ninth Circuit Court of Appeals lifts its stay of a lower court order that prohibited enforcement of the California Constitution's ban on same-sex marriages. Same-sex marriages resume in California, after being banned since November 5, 2008.
- June 28: U.S. Citizenship & Immigration Services approves a permanent resident visa (green card) for a same-sex couple for the first time.
- June 28: The Office of Personnel Management invites the same-sex spouses of civilian federal employees and retirees to enroll in their spouses' health, life insurance, and other benefit programs.
- July 1: Delaware's statute authorizing same-sex marriages takes effect.
- July 1: Minnesota recognizes the validity of same-sex marriage from other jurisdictions, though it does not yet authorize its own same-sex marriages.
- July 24: Montgomery County, Pennsylvania, begins issuing marriage licenses to same-sex couples, in violation of state law.
- August 1: Rhode Island's statute authorizing same-sex marriages takes effect.
- August 1: Minnesota's statute authorizing same-sex marriages takes effect.
- August 11: John Berry, U.S. Ambassador to Australia, becomes the first U.S. diplomat to marry a same-sex partner.
- August 21: The county clerk's office in Doña Ana County, New Mexico, begins issuing marriage licenses to same-sex couples.
- August 23: The county clerk's office in Santa Fe County, New Mexico, begins issuing marriage licenses to same-sex couples after being ordered to do so by a state judge on August 22.
- August 27: The county clerk's office in Bernalillo County, New Mexico, begins issuing marriage licenses to same-sex couples after being ordered to do so by a state judge on August 26.
- August 27: The county clerks of San Miguel, Valencia, and Taos counties, New Mexico, announce they will begin issuing marriage licenses to same-sex couples.
- August 31: Supreme Court Justice Ruth Bader Ginsburg becomes the first member of that court to officiate at the marriage ceremony of a same-sex couple.
- September 3: The county clerk's office in Grant County, New Mexico, announces it will make same-sex marriage licenses available during the second week of September.
- September 4: The county clerk's office in Los Alamos County, New Mexico, begins issuing marriage licenses to same-sex couples after a New Mexico district court rejects the clerk's arguments against doing so.
- September 12: A Pennsylvania state judge orders Montgomery County to stop issuing marriage licenses to same-sex couples.
- September 27: A New Jersey state Superior Court judge rules that beginning October 21 the state must allow same-sex couples to marry because they are otherwise denied federal rights due them following the U.S. Supreme Court decision in United States v. Windsor .
- October 15: In North Carolina, the Buncombe County Register of Deeds accepts applications for same-sex marriage licenses from 10 couples, which he does not grant pending authorization from the state attorney general.
- October 16: Based on an opinion from the Oregon Department of Justice, Oregon begins recognizing same-sex marriages from other jurisdictions.
- October 21: After the New Jersey Supreme Court on October 18 unanimously refused to stay a lower court's order pending appeal, same-sex marriages begin and Governor Chris Christie drops the state's appeal of the lower court's ruling.
- November 13: Governor Neil Abercrombie from Hawaii signs a bill granting marriage to same-sex couples, making Hawaii the fifteenth such US state. The legislation was approved by the state Senate by a 19–4 vote on 12 November and previously by the House by a 30–19 vote on 8 November. This legislation started to be debated on 28 October 2013.
- November 14: Missouri Governor Jay Nixon announces an executive order to allow same-sex couples married in other jurisdictions to file joint state income taxes if they file joint federal returns.
- November 20: Governor Pat Quinn from Illinois signs a bill granting marriage to same-sex couples. The legislation was previously approved by the House by a 61–54 vote on 5 November and by the Senate by a 34–21 vote on 14 February.
- December 2: Hawaii's statute authorizing same-sex marriages takes effect.
- December 19: The New Mexico Supreme Court issues a unanimous decision in Griego v. Oliver that holds that same-sex couples enjoy the same marriage rights as different-sex couples.
- December 20: Judge Robert Shelby of the U.S. District Court for the District of Utah rules in Kitchen v. Herbert that the Utah state constitution's ban on same-sex marriage denies same-sex couples equal protection and due process. The first Utah marriage licenses are issued to same-sex couples.

=== 2014 ===
- January 6: The U.S. Supreme Court stays the District Court's order of December 20, 2013, in Kitchen v. Herbert, halting same-sex marriages in Utah while the decision is appealed.
- January 10: U.S. Attorney General Eric Holder announces that the federal government recognizes the marriages of same-sex couples who married in Utah between December 20, 2013, and January 6, 2014. Their number is estimated at 1,360.
- January 14: U.S. District Court Judge Terence C. Kern rules in Bishop v. Oklahoma that Oklahoma's ban on same-sex marriage is unconstitutional. He stays enforcement of his decision based on the Supreme Court's action in Kitchen v. Herbert on January 6.
- February 8: Attorney General Eric H. Holder Jr. on Saturday, announced a new Department of Justice policy at the Waldorf Astoria in New York for the Human Rights Campaign's greater New York gala. In the speech he announces that all federal government lawyers are to give same-sex marriages, "full and equal recognition, to the greatest extent possible under the law."
- February 12: U.S. District Court Judge John G. Heyburn rules that Kentucky must recognize same-sex marriages from other jurisdictions. He stays his decision on March 19.
- February 13: U.S. District Court Judge Arenda Wright Allen rules in Bostic v. Rainey that Virginia's ban on same-sex marriage is unconstitutional and stays enforcement of her decision pending appeal.
- February 21: In Lee v. Orr, U.S. District Court Judge Sharon Johnson Coleman rules that Cook County can issue marriage licenses to same-sex couples without waiting for the Illinois statute legalizing same-sex marriage to take effect on June 1. Some licenses are issued the same day.
- February 26: In De Leon v. Perry, U.S. District Court Judge Orlando Garcia rules that Texas' ban on same-sex marriage is unconstitutional and stays enforcement of his ruling pending appeal to the Fifth Circuit.
- March 5: An ABC News/Washington Post poll finds 59% of Americans support same-sex marriage, a record high.
- March 14: U.S. District Court Judge Aleta Trauger rules in Tanco v. Haslam that the state of Tennessee must recognize the plaintiffs' three same-sex marriages as their case is heard in the United States District Court for the Middle District of Tennessee. This decision is stayed on April 26 by the Sixth Circuit.
- March 21: In DeBoer v. Snyder, U.S. District Court Judge Bernard A. Friedman rules that Michigan's ban on same-sex marriage is unconstitutional and does not stay his decision.
- March 22: In Michigan, several hundred same-sex couples obtain marriage licenses and some marry before the Sixth Circuit Court of Appeals issues a temporary stay of the decision in DeBoer v. Snyder, which it makes permanent pending appeal on March 25.
- March 24: The U.S. division of World Vision, one of the largest Christian charities in the U.S., modifies its employment eligibility rules to include gays and lesbians in same-sex marriages, while "[a]bstinence outside of marriage remains a rule". It reverses that policy on March 26 in response to protests from its donors.
- April 10: U.S. District Court Judge Richard L. Young, in the case of Baskin v. Bogan, orders the state of Indiana to recognize the same-sex marriage of a terminally ill woman.
- April 14: U.S. District Court Judge Timothy Black rules in Henry v. Himes that Ohio must recognize same-sex marriages from other jurisdictions. On April 16 he stays his ruling pending appeal, except for the birth certificates sought by the plaintiffs for their children.
- May 9: Pulaski County Circuit Judge Chris Piazza strikes down Arkansas's ban on same-sex marriage. The ruling is stayed on May 16 by the Arkansas Supreme Court.
- May 10: Kristin Seaton & Jennifer Rambon of Eureka Springs, Arkansas are the first same-sex couple to receive a marriage license in the overlapping Southern regions of Dixie and Bible Belt.
- May 13: U.S. District Magistrate Candy Dale strikes down Idaho's ban on same-sex marriage. The ruling is stayed on May 15 by the Ninth Circuit.
- May 19: U.S. District Court Judge Michael McShane strikes down Oregon's ban on same-sex marriage.
- May 20: U.S. District Court Judge John Jones strikes down Pennsylvania's ban on same-sex marriage.
- June 6: U.S. District Court Judge Barbara Crabb strikes down Wisconsin's ban on same-sex marriage. The decision is stayed on June 13.
- June 19: The General Assembly of the Presbyterian Church approves a resolution to allow ministers to preside over same-sex marriages in states where the unions are legal and local congregational leaders approve, reversing defeat of a similar measure in 2012. In a separate vote, the assembly approves individual congregational authority to change the definition of marriage from "a man and a woman" to "a union of two people" in their constitution. The amendment requires approval from a majority of the 172 regional presbyteries. They become the third Mainline denomination to do so.
- June 25: U.S. District Court Judge Richard L. Young strikes down Indiana's ban on same-sex marriage. The decision is stayed two days later by the Seventh Circuit Court of Appeals.
- June 25: Ruling 2–1 in Kitchen v. Herbert, the Tenth Circuit Court of Appeals strikes down Utah's same-sex marriage ban. It is the first appellate court decision to find that marriage is a fundamental right that applies to same-sex couples. The decision is immediately stayed in anticipation of an appeal to the United States Supreme Court.
- June 25: Boulder County, Colorado, begins issuing marriage licenses to same-sex couples, despite a stay of the previous day's ruling.
- July 1: U.S. District Court Judge John G. Heyburn expands his February 12 ruling, striking down Kentucky's same-sex marriage ban in its entirety. The decision is stayed immediately.
- July 1: The Seventh Circuit Court of Appeals orders the state of Indiana to recognize the same-sex marriage of a terminally ill woman.
- July 9: Judge C. Scott Crabtree of Colorado's 17th Judicial District Court strikes down Colorado's same-sex marriage ban. He stays enforcement of his ruling pending appeal.
- July 10: Denver County, Colorado begins issuing marriage licenses to same-sex couples after a state judge rules that the Boulder County clerk is under no obligation to stop issuing such licenses despite the state's ban on gay marriage.
- July 11: Pueblo County, Colorado, begins issuing marriage licenses to same-sex couples.
- July 16: In a unanimous decision, the Connecticut Supreme Court rules that same-sex couples are entitled to some of the legal rights of marriage with respect to events that predate the state's establishment of same-sex civil unions in 2005 and same-sex marriage in 2008.
- July 17: Florida Circuit Judge Luis M. Garcia, ruling in Huntsman v. Heavilin, strikes down the state's ban on same-sex marriage with respect to Monroe County. It is stayed the same day when the state files an appeal.
- July 18: Ruling 2–1 in Bishop v. United States, the Tenth Circuit Court of Appeals strikes down Oklahoma's ban on same-sex marriage ban, repeating the arguments it made with respect to Utah on June 25.
- July 18: The Colorado Supreme Court orders the clerk of Denver County to stop issuing marriage licenses to same-sex couples.
- July 18: The United States Supreme Court grants a stay of a lower court decision requiring the state of Utah to recognize the validity of same-sex marriages performed there between December 20, 2013, and January 6, 2014.
- July 21: Pueblo County, Colorado, stops issuing marriage licenses to same-sex couples.
- July 23: U.S. District Court Judge Raymond P. Moore strikes down Colorado's same-sex marriage ban. The decision is stayed on August 21.
- July 25: The Colorado Court of Appeals rules that Boulder County can continue issuing marriage licenses to same-sex couples.
- July 25: In Pareto v. Ruvin, Florida Circuit Judge Sarah Zabel strikes down the state's ban on same-sex marriage as applied to Miami-Dade County. She puts enforcement of her ruling on hold pending appeal.
- July 28: The Fourth Circuit Court of Appeals, ruling 2–1 in Bostic v. Schaefer, strikes down Virginia's same-sex marriage ban.
- July 29: The Colorado Supreme Court orders the Boulder County clerk to stop issuing marriage licenses to same-sex couples.
- July 31: In a unanimous decision, the Wisconsin Supreme Court rules that a 2009 law allowing same-sex couples to apply for domestic partnerships does not violate the state's Marriage Protection Amendment.
- August 4: Florida Circuit Judge Dale Cohen strikes down the state's ban on same-sex marriage as applied to Broward County. He puts enforcement of his ruling on hold pending appeal.
- August 20: The United States Supreme Court stays enforcement of the Fourth Circuit's July 28 decision in Bostic pending appeal.
- August 21: U.S. District Court Judge Robert Lewis Hinkle rules in two cases that Florida's ban on same-sex marriage is unconstitutional and stays his decision pending appeal.
- September 3: U.S. District Court Judge Martin Feldman rules in Robicheaux v. Caldwell that Louisiana's ban on same-sex marriage serves its "legitimate interest ... in linking children to an intact family formed by their two biological parents". It is the first federal court decision find a state's denial of marriage rights to same-sex couples constitutional since the Supreme Court ruling in Windsor in June 2013.
- September 4: The Seventh Circuit Court of Appeals, in a unanimous opinion authored by Judge Richard Posner, upholds the district court decisions in Baskin v. Bogan and Wolf v. Walker that found Indiana's and Wisconsin's denial of marriage rights to same-sex couples unconstitutional. It stays its decision on September 15.
- September 12: U.S. District Court Judge John Sedwick orders Arizona to recognize one same-sex marriage on a death certificate while he considers a lawsuit challenging Arizona's ban on same-sex marriage.
- September 22: State Judge Edward D. Rubin rules that Louisiana's ban on same-sex marriage is unconstitutional.
- October 3: State Judge J. Dale Youngs rules that Missouri must recognize same-sex marriages performed in other jurisdictions. The state announces it will not appeal on October 6.
- October 6: The U.S. Supreme Court declines to take action on all the cases it had been asked to consider from appellate courts in the Fourth, Seventh, and Tenth Circuits, allowing the circuit court decisions striking down marriage bans in Indiana, Oklahoma, Utah, Virginia, and Wisconsin to stand. Stays preventing the legalization of same-sex marriage in Indiana and Wisconsin end automatically with the Supreme Court's action.
- October 6: The Tenth Circuit Court of Appeals lifts stays in two cases, ordering Oklahoma and Utah to issue same-sex marriage licenses. The Fourth Circuit does the same for Virginia.
- October 7: Same-sex marriage begins in Colorado after Attorney General John Suthers orders all counties in the state to issue same-sex marriage licenses.
- October 7: The Ninth Circuit Court of Appeals strikes down same-sex marriage bans in Idaho in Latta v. Otter and Nevada in Sevcik v. Sandoval . Supreme Court Justice Anthony Kennedy suspends implementation of the decision in Idaho the next day.
- October 9: Nevada recognizes same-sex marriage following a court order resulting from the Ninth Circuit's ruling in Sevcik on October 7. Following the U.S. Supreme Court's refusal to consider Bostic on October 6, West Virginia recognizes same-sex marriage when state officials concede their ban is unconstitutional based on Fourth Circuit's ruling in that case.
- October 10: U.S. Supreme Court Justice Anthony Kennedy denies a motion to stay sought by Idaho officials who hoped to prevent implementation of the Ninth Circuit's October 7 ruling in Latta.
- October 10: U.S. District Judge Max O. Cogburn, Jr., ruling in General Synod of the United Church of Christ v. Cooper, strikes down North Carolina's ban on same-sex marriage.
- October 12: U.S. District Judge Timothy Burgess rules in Hamby v. Parnell that Alaska's ban on same-sex marriage is unconstitutional, immediately legalizing same-sex marriage there.
- October 15: Same-sex marriage becomes legal in Idaho with the lifting of the stay in Latta v. Otter.
- October 17: U.S. District Judge John Sedwick rules that Arizona's ban on same-sex marriage is unconstitutional in Connolly v. Jeanes. The state orders its agencies to comply immediately.
- October 17: U.S. District Judge Scott Skavdahl rules in Guzzo v. Mead that Wyoming's ban on same-sex marriage is unconstitutional, but issues a temporary stay.
- October 21: Same-sex marriage becomes legal in Wyoming, when state officials notify the U.S. district court that they will not appeal the previous week's ruling.
- October 21: U.S. District Judge Juan Manuel Perez-Gimenez upholds Puerto Rico's ban on same-sex marriage, concluding that Baker v. Nelson is binding on federal courts.
- November 4: U.S. District Judge Daniel D. Crabtree rules in Marie v. Moser that Kansas's ban on same-sex marriage is unconstitutional. His decision takes effect on November 12 when the state defendants exhaust their options for obtaining a stay pending appeal.
- November 5: St. Louis Circuit Judge Rex Burlison rules that Missouri's ban on same-sex marriage is unconstitutional and that the city of St. Louis can not enforce the ban. City officials announce intentions to grant same-sex marriage licenses immediately.
- November 6: The Sixth Circuit Court of Appeals in a 2–1 ruling upholds same-sex marriage bans in Kentucky, Michigan, Ohio, and Tennessee.
- November 7: U.S. District Judge Ortrie Smith rules in Lawson v. Kelly that Missouri's ban on same-sex marriage is unconstitutional, staying his order pending appeal.
- November 12: U.S. District Judge Richard Gergel rules in Condon v. Haley that South Carolina's ban on same-sex marriage is unconstitutional. His decision takes effect on November 20.
- November 19: U.S. District Judge Brian Morris rules in Rolando v. Fox that Montana's ban on same-sex marriage is unconstitutional. The decision takes effect immediately.
- November 25: U.S. District Judge Kristine Baker rules in Jernigan v. Crane that Arkansas's ban on same-sex marriage is unconstitutional. The decision is stayed pending appeal.
- November 25: U.S. District Judge Carlton W. Reeves rules in Campaign for Southern Equality v. Bryant that Mississippi's ban on same-sex marriage is unconstitutional. The Fifth Circuit stays his ruling on December 4.

=== 2015 ===
- January 5: Miami-Dade County, Florida, Circuit Court Judge Sarah Zabel allows her decision that held Florida's ban on same-sex marriage unconstitutional to take effect. Same-sex couples in Miami-Dade County obtain marriage licenses beginning mid-day.
- January 6: A stay issued months earlier in the case of Brenner v. Scott expires and same-sex marriage becomes legal throughout Florida.
- January 12: U.S. District Judge Karen Schreier rules in Rosenbrahn v. Daugaard that South Dakota's ban on same-sex marriage is unconstitutional. She stays her decision pending appeal.
- January 15: U.S. District Judge Mark A. Goldsmith rules in Caspar v. Snyder that Michigan must recognize the validity of more than 300 marriages of same-sex couples married the previous March in the time between a district court found the state's ban on same-sex marriage unconstitutional and the Sixth Circuit Court of Appeals stayed that ruling. He stays implementation of his ruling for 21 days. Governor Rick Snyder announces on February 4 that the state will recognize those marriages and not appeal the decision.
- January 16: The U.S. Supreme Court agrees to consider four cases on appeal from the Sixth Circuit, consolidating them as one and setting a briefing schedule to be completed April 17.
- January 23: U.S. District Judge Callie V.S. Granade rules in Searcy v. Strange that Alabama's ban on same-sex marriage is unconstitutional. Two days later she stays her injunction until February 9. She issues a similar ruling and stay in Strawser v. Strange four days later.
- February 9: With the lifting of stays in two federal court decisions, same-sex marriage becomes legal in Alabama and same-sex couples obtain marriage licenses. Some county judges have continued to enforce the pre-existing ban by not granting licenses to same-sex couples, while some other counties have stopped issuing marriage licenses altogether.
- February 17: A state judge in Travis County, Texas, rules that Texas' ban on same-sex marriage is unconstitutional and recognizes the common law marriage of two women. Two days later, another state judge orders the Travis County clerk to issue a marriage license to two women, one of whom is seriously ill. They wed before the Texas Supreme Court stays the judge's order.
- February 19: A CNN poll finds 63% of Americans believe gays and lesbians have a constitutional right to marry, up from 49% in August 2010.
- March 2: U.S. District Judge Joseph Bataillon, who in 2005 had ruled Nebraska's constitutional ban on same-sex marriage unconstitutional only to have his decision overturned, strikes down Nebraska's ban on same-sex marriage. He orders state officials to cease enforcing that ban as of March 9. The decision is stayed by the Eighth Circuit on March 5.
- March 3: The Alabama Supreme Court orders all counties in the state to stop issuing marriage licenses to same-sex couples.
- March 17: A majority of the 171 regional bodies of the Presbyterian Church (U.S.A.) votes to modify their constitution to include same-sex marriage in their definition of marriage.
- March 20: Puerto Rico officials announce that they will no longer defend the Commonwealth's ban on same-sex marriage in court and ask the First Circuit Court of Appeals to reverse the lower court's ruling in Conde-Vidal v. Garcia-Padilla.
- April 28: The U.S. Supreme Court hears oral argument in Obergefell v. Hodges and related cases.
- May 21: U.S. District Judge Callie V.S. Granade rules that all probate judges in the state of Alabama must grant same-sex marriage licenses. She stays her ruling pending a Supreme Court decision.
- June 5: Chief Judge Frances Tydingco-Gatewood of the U.S. territory of Guam strikes down its ban on same-sex marriage in Aguero v. Calvo. The decision takes effect on June 8.
- June 9: Pulaski County Circuit Judge Wendell Griffen rules that over 500 same-sex marriages performed in Arkansas in May 2014 are valid.
- June 26: The United States Supreme Court rules in Obergefell v. Hodges that because the fundamental right to marry extends to same-sex couples, same-sex marriage bans are unconstitutional under the Fourteenth Amendment. The decision renders same-sex marriage legal throughout the entire United States.
- July 1: The Episcopal Church, by overwhelming votes at its General Convention, removes gender-specific language from church laws on marriage to allow for religious wedding services for same-sex couples. It is the fourth mainline denomination to allow for such liturgies.
- December 16: A Massachusetts Superior Court judge rules in Barrett v. Fontbonne Academy that the Roman Catholic school violated the state's laws against discrimination on the basis of sexual orientation and gender in withdrawing a job offer from a man when it learned he was in a same-sex marriage.

=== 2016 ===
- January 5: The U.S. Citizenship and Immigration Services approves the immigrant visa petition filed in 1975 by Richard Adams (1947–2012) on behalf of his husband, an Australian citizen, having recognized the validity of their marriage that was the subject of Adams v. Howerton (1982). His husband Anthony Sullivan receives his green card in April 2016.
- January 6: Alabama Supreme Court Chief Justice Roy Moore orders the state's probate judges not to issue marriage licenses to same-sex couples.
- January 14: The Anglican Communion, an international organization, censures its US branch, the Episcopal Church USA because of its support for same-sex marriage, and suspends it from participating in the organization's decisions "on any issues pertaining to doctrine or polity".
- March 8: U.S. District Court Judge Juan Perez-Gimenez, ordered by the First Circuit Court of Appeals to reconsider his October 2014 ruling that found Puerto Rico's ban on same-sex marriage constitutional, rules that the US Supreme Court decision in Obergefell does not apply to Puerto Rico because constitutional guarantees do not apply in an unincorporated territory.
- April 6: The First Circuit Court of Appeals overrules Judge Perez-Gimenez Puerto Rico decision saying it "errs in so many respects that it is hard to know where to begin". It returns the case to the District Court to be assigned to a different judge. On April 7 Judge Gustavo Gelpi rules Puerto Rico's ban on same-sex marriage unconstitutional.
- May 6: Alabama Chief Justice Roy Moore is suspended when a judicial oversight group files a complaint that his ordering probate judges on January 6 not to issue marriage licenses to same-sex couples "flagrantly disregarded and abused his authority".
- June 7: U.S. District Judge Callie V.S. Granade issues a permanent injunction against the enforcement of Alabama's laws against same-sex marriage.
- July 1: Judge Carlton Reeves extends his earlier decision and prevents a Mississippi law allowing court clerks to refuse marriage licenses to same-sex couples based on their religious beliefs from taking effect.
- July 17: The Republican National Convention approves a platform that condemns Obergefell v. Hodges and calls for its reversal "through judicial reconsideration or a constitutional amendment returning control over marriage to the states". It asserts the "legitimate constitutional authority to define marriage as the union of one man and one woman" and calls for "the appointment of justices and judges who ... respect the authority of the states to decide such fundamental social questions. It opposes "government discrimination against businesses or entities which decline to sell items or services to individuals for activities that go against their religious views about such activities."
- July 25: The Democratic National Convention adopts a platform that says "Democrats applaud last year's decision by the Supreme Court that recognized that LGBT people–like other Americans–have the right to marry the person they love."
- August 1: In his official residence, Vice President Joe Biden, a Catholic, officiates at the wedding of two male members of the White House staff. Four days later, three leading Roman Catholic bishops, without naming Biden, call it "a counter witness" to Catholic teaching.
- December 9: The attorney general of the Cherokee Nation rules that the tribe recognizes same-sex marriage.

=== 2017 ===
- March 20: A referendum on whether same-sex marriages should be performed in the Osage Nation in Oklahoma is passed, with 770 voting for same-sex marriage and 700 voting against. The law takes effect immediately.
- March 22: The Minnesota-based Prairie Island Indian Community which forms a part of the Mdewakanton Dakota legalizes same-sex marriage by changing its Domestic Relations Code. Section 1, Chapter 3c of the Code now states that "two persons of the same or opposite gender may marry." A previous version had explicitly banned same-sex marriages.
- June 5: the Legislature of the Ho-Chunk Nation of Wisconsin approves a bill to legalize same-sex marriage, in a 13–0 vote.
- October 25: the Ak-Chin Indian Community Court of the Ak-Chin Indian Community ruled that the law banning same-sex marriage is in violation with the tribe's constitution and the Indian Civil Rights Act of 1968. The tribe's chairman announced that the government will not appeal the ruling.

=== 2018 ===
- October 2: the State Department, under Secretary of State Mike Pompeo, reverses a 2009 policy instituted under former Secretary Hillary Clinton which allowed family visas to unmarried same-sex partners of diplomats posted in the United States, even if the countries represented by the diplomats have only legalized same-sex civil partnerships but not same-sex marriage. Under the new policy, same-sex partners have to obtain marriages to their diplomat partners within three months or else lose their family visas. The department states that the new policy seeks to "ensure and promote equal treatment" for both same- and opposite-sex couples by the department.

=== 2019 ===
- February 26: The United Methodist Church rejects a proposal to ease its restrictions on same-sex marriage.

== 2020s ==
=== 2020 ===
- Voters in Nevada repeal their constitutional ban on same-sex marriage and replacing it with text protecting the right to marriage regardless of gender, protecting the right of religious officiants to refuse to solemnize a marriage, and mandating equal treatment of legally-valid marriages under law. The ballot measure repeals 2002 Nevada Question 2, with Nevada becoming the first of 30 states to repeal such language from their state constitution since the enactment of Measure 2 by Alaska voters in 1998.

=== 2022 ===
- June 24: The Supreme Court overturns Roe v. Wade; Justice Thomas writes that the court “should reconsider all of this Court’s substantive due process precedents, including Griswold, Lawrence, and Obergefell”.
- December 8: To prevent the loss of the right to same-sex marriage, the United States House of Representatives passed the Respect for Marriage Act which would nullify DOMA and protect both same-sex and interracial marriages. In July 2022, the bill passed 267–157, with 47 Republican representatives joining the Democrats. In December 2022, the United States Senate passed the bill 61–36, and the House again voted 258–169 to pass it.
- December 13: President Biden signs the Respect for Marriage Act into law at the White House.

=== 2024 ===
- May 5: The United Methodist Church votes to lift its ban on officiation of same-sex weddings and ordination of LGBT clergy.
- November 5: California and Colorado voters repeal their state constitutional bans on same-sex marriage, formally repealing 2008 California Proposition 8 and 2006 Colorado Amendment 43, respectively, while voters in Hawaii repeal language from their state constitutional which gave the Hawaii State Legislature statutory power to limit marriage to opposite-sex couples, which had been added to the state constitution by way of 1998 Hawaii Amendment 2.

=== 2025 ===
- January 27: *The Idaho House of Representatives votes 46 to 24, for a resolution that calls for the Supreme Court to reconsider its 2015 Obergefell v. Hodges same sex marriage decision.
- February 25 – The North Dakota House of Representatives votes 52 to 40, for a resolution that calls for the US Supreme Court to reconsider its 2015 Obergefell v. Hodges same sex marriage decision.
- April 7: Governor Jared Polis signs legislation repealing prohibitive statutory language regarding same-sex marriage in Colorado in compliance with Amendment J.
- November 7: The United States Supreme Court decides not to hear a challenge to same-sex marriage.

=== 2026 ===
- January 16: The Virginia General Assembly places a constitutional amendment on the ballot to repeal the state's defunct constitutional ban on same-sex marriage.
- November 3: Virginia voters repeal the state's unenforceable ban on same-sex marriage.

== See also ==
- Public opinion of same-sex marriage in the United States
- Same-sex marriage in the United States
- History of same-sex marriage in the United States
- Same-sex marriage in tribal nations in the United States
- Same-sex marriage legislation in the United States
- Same-sex union legislation
- Status of same-sex marriage
- Timeline of same-sex marriage
- Timeline of LGBT history
