= Same-sex marriage in Missouri =

Same-sex marriage has been legal in Missouri since the U.S. Supreme Court's ruling in Obergefell v. Hodges on June 26, 2015, which struck down state bans on same-sex marriages as violating the Due Process and Equal Protection clauses of the Fourteenth Amendment. Prior to the court ruling, the state recognized same-sex marriages from other jurisdictions pursuant to a state court ruling in Barrier v. Vasterling in October 2014, and certain jurisdictions of the state performed same-sex marriages despite a statewide ban. On November 5, 2014, a state court ruling striking down Missouri's same-sex marriage ban in State of Missouri v. Florida ordered St. Louis to issue marriage licenses to same-sex couples. In response, St. Louis County also began issuing marriage licenses. On November 7, the U.S. District Court for the Western District of Missouri struck down Missouri's same-sex marriage ban in Lawson v. Kelly, but stayed its order directing Jackson County to issue licenses to same-sex couples. Despite the stay, Jackson County began issuing marriage licenses immediately following the ruling. Assessing the state of same-sex marriage litigation in December 2014, Marc Solomon of Freedom to Marry said, "Missouri [was] the most complex state on this issue."

Missouri had previously denied marriage rights to same-sex couples by statute and in its State Constitution since 2004. Polling suggests that a majority of Missouri residents support the legal recognition of same-sex marriage, with a 2024 Public Religion Research Institute poll showing that 61% of respondents supported same-sex marriage.

== Legal restrictions ==
=== Statutes ===
While unenforceable, state statutes ban same-sex marriage and prohibit the recognition of out-of-state same-sex marriages. In 2001, a few years after the passage of the federal Defense of Marriage Act (DOMA), the Missouri General Assembly passed legislation declaring it "the public policy of this state to recognize marriage only between a man and a woman". In February 2025, the Senate rejected 6–19 a bill introduced by Senator Stephen Webber to repeal the now-defunct statutory ban on same-sex marriages. Webber said, "It wouldn't [have] changed anything in the current status quo, but it would [have] take[n] a statute off the books that had been recognized by the United States Supreme Court as being unconstitutional."

=== Constitutional amendment ===
In August 2004, 71% of Missouri voters ratified Amendment 2, which restricted the validity and recognition of marriage in Missouri to the "union of one man and one woman". In December 2022, Representative Chris Sander introduced a constitutional amendment to repeal the ban. Sander said, "My intent with the language is to have the Missouri Constitution in line with federal law because I believe federal law is the correct ruling. This country has a history of saying who can't get married in an ugly way." The amendment required approval in both the Senate and the House of Representatives before being placed on the ballot for approval by voters. However, the measure failed to pass before the end of the legislative session in May 2023. In June, activists announced that they had initiated a petition to repeal the same-sex marriage ban. The petition required more than 170,000 signatures to be collected, verified, and submitted by May 6, 2024; however, it did not appear on the 2024 ballot.

== Lawsuits ==
Same-sex marriage in the United States

=== Early state cases ===
In February 2014, a Boone County judge granted a divorce to two women, Dena and Samantha Latimer, who had married in Massachusetts in 2009. After a circuit court in St. Louis County denied him a divorce sua sponte, a man married in Iowa to a man now incarcerated in a Missouri prison appealed to the Missouri Supreme Court on March 13, 2014, which heard oral arguments on December 3. In re Marriage of M.S., the Supreme Court reversed the lower court's decision on February 10, 2015, holding that the circuit court had subject-matter jurisdiction because the plain language of the Missouri Constitution provides that Missouri circuit courts have jurisdiction over all civil cases and matters (and a petition for dissolution of marriage is a civil case), and remanded the case back to the lower court.

=== Barrier v. Vasterling ===
Missouri statutes prohibited the recognition of same-sex marriages validity performed in other jurisdictions. On November 14, 2013, Governor Jay Nixon issued an executive order allowing same-sex couples married in other jurisdictions to file a combined Missouri income tax return if they file their federal return jointly. Four conservatives, three associated with the Missouri Baptist Convention and one a former St. Charles County Executive associated with Focus on the Family, filed Messer v. Nixon in Cole County Circuit Court on January 8, 2014, seeking to prevent the practice. The lawsuit was unsuccessful.

On February 11, 2014, the American Civil Liberties Union (ACLU) filed a lawsuit in state circuit court, Barrier v. Vasterling, challenging the state's refusal to recognize same-sex marriages from other jurisdictions, on behalf of eight same-sex couples, later joined by two more. Oral arguments were held on September 2 before Judge J. Dale Youngs in the Jackson County Circuit Court in Kansas City. On October 3, Judge Youngs ruled that Missouri's refusal to recognize same-sex marriages from other jurisdictions violated the plaintiffs' right to equal protection under both the state and federal constitutions. He ordered the state to recognize such marriages and held the state responsible for the plaintiffs' legal expenses. On October 6, the Missouri Attorney General, Chris Koster, announced that the state would not appeal the decision. Members of the Missouri General Assembly sought to intervene in the suit and appeal the decision, but the court rejected their petition as filed too late for the court to act.

=== State of Missouri v. Florida ===
In June 2014, St. Louis officials licensed four same-sex marriages in order to provide the basis for a lawsuit when the state would order them to stop. St. Louis Circuit Judge Rex Burlison held a hearing in the suit, originally State of Missouri v. Carpenter (later State of Missouri v. Florida), on September 29 in state circuit court. He ruled in favor of the plaintiffs on November 5, ruling that Missouri's refusal to license same-sex marriages violated the Missouri and federal constitutions. Attorney General Koster announced plans to appeal the ruling to the Missouri Supreme Court, but not to seek a stay of the ruling's implementation because "[f]ollowing decisions in Idaho and Alaska, the United States Supreme Court has refused to grant stays on identical facts." Attorney General Koster and the Recorders' Association of Missouri said Judge Burlison's order only applied to the city of St. Louis, where the city's marriage license department began issuing marriage licenses to same-sex couples. St. Louis County, where an official said "We believe it's a county-by-county decision", began issuing marriage licenses to same-sex couples the next day.

=== Lawson v. Kelly ===
Same-sex marriage in Missouri prior to Obergefell v. Hodges Same-sex marriage legal County issuing same-sex marriage licenses on own initiative without specific legalization^{*} Same-sex marriage ban overturned, stayed pending appeal; same-sex marriage recognized when performed elsewhere^{*} These counties also qualify for the gray color.

In June 2014, Jackson County denied marriage licenses to two same-sex couples, which provided, according to Jackson County Executive Mike Sanders, a better vehicle for a lawsuit than the St. Louis case. On June 24, the ACLU filed Lawson v. Kelly in circuit court on behalf of the two same-sex couples who had been denied marriage licenses there. Jackson County officials said it was up to the Attorney General to defend the state's position. Attorney General Koster intervened and had the case moved to the U.S. District Court for the Western District of Missouri. U.S. District Court Judge Ortrie D. Smith ruled for the plaintiffs on November 7, finding that Missouri's ban denied the plaintiffs the fundamental right to marry and discriminated against them on the basis of gender, but not on the basis of sexual orientation. He ordered only Jackson County to issue marriage licenses to same-sex couples and stayed his order pending conclusion of any appeal. Despite the stay, Jackson County began issuing marriage licenses to same-sex couples immediately following the decision. Judge Smith wrote:

The Court does not take lightly a request to declare that a state law is unconstitutional. Statutes are passed by the duly elected representatives of the people. Article I, section 33 constitutes the direct expression of the people's will. It is not on a whim that the Court supplants the will of the voters or the decisions of the legislature. But it should not be forgotten that the Constitution is also an expression of the people's will. Indeed, it is the paramount expression of the people's will; it cannot easily be cast aside or circumvented by a vote of the citizens of a single state. Just as Missouri citizens cannot abridge the First Amendment by amending the Missouri Constitution, they cannot abridge the Fourteenth Amendment in that manner. [...] In reaching its decision in this case the Court has necessarily declared the State's prohibition on same-sex marriages violates the Constitution.

On November 21, the plaintiffs asked Judge Smith to lift his stay given that St. Louis had been ordered to issue marriage licenses to same-sex couples in State of Missouri v. Florida and noting that the state had taken no position on the request. He refused on November 25, noting that licenses might be issued "that could later be determined to have been issued in error" if his decision was reversed. Attorney General Koster filed a notice of appeal in the Eighth Circuit Court of Appeals on December 5. On December 8, the same-sex couples also filed a notice of appeal to contest the district court's rejection of their claim of discrimination on the basis of sexual orientation.

On December 10, the couples asked the Eighth Circuit to vacate the district court's stay or hear their appeal on an expedited basis. On December 20, the couples asked the Eighth Circuit to consider their request to vacate the stay in light of the U.S. Supreme Court's refusal the previous day to grant a stay in a Florida case, Armstrong v. Brenner. The state replied to the couples' motion on December 24, calling the request for expedited consideration premature given the likelihood that in January the U.S. Supreme Court would agree to hear a same-sex marriage case. The state's brief did not mention the district court's stay. On January 9, 2015, the couples asked the Eighth Circuit for a "prompt ruling" on their request, noting that the state had offered no argument against lifting the stay and that the Supreme Court had not accepted a petition for certiorari in a same-sex marriage case that day. They wrote: "there is no equitable reason to hold the current case in perpetual limbo". On January 21, the state asked the court to suspend proceedings pending action by the U.S. Supreme Court in similar same-sex marriage cases. The couples supported that request only if the court lifted the stay. On January 22, the court refused both to lift the stay and to suspend proceedings. It agreed to expedite the case. On February 9, the plaintiff couples again asked the Eighth Circuit to lift the stay, citing the Supreme Court's refusal to grant a stay in Searcy v. Strange, a same-sex marriage case from Alabama.

On June 26, 2015, following the U.S. Supreme Court's decision in Obergefell v. Hodges that same-sex marriage bans violate the Due Process and Equal Protection clauses of the Fourteenth Amendment, the plaintiffs asked the Eighth Circuit to lift the stay, and the state asked the court to dismiss its appeal of the district court decision, which it did on July 1. As a result, same-sex couples began immediately marrying throughout Missouri. Angie Boyle and Laura Zinszer, together for 19 years, were the first couple to receive a marriage license in Columbia on June 26. On July 7, Governor Jay Nixon issued an executive order requiring all state departments and agencies to immediately take all necessary measures to ensure compliance with the Obergefell decision. Attorney General Koster reacted to the ruling by stating, "The history of our country has always been one of moving toward inclusion and equality. I applaud the court for their courage and strong sense of fairness. Missourians should be seen as equals under the law; regardless of their gender, race, or whom they love." Governor Nixon also welcomed the court decision, "Today's decision in Obergefell v. Hodges is a major victory for equality and an important step toward a fairer and more just society for all Americans." Congresswoman Vicky Hartzler said she was "disappointed", "Decisions on marriage policy should be left in the hands of the 50 states, allowing those who wish to define marriage as being between one man and one woman, as we did in Missouri, to do so. Today's ruling tramples on the voice of the people."

== Development after legalization ==
In January 2025, Representative Mitch Boggs introduced legislation to create a form of covenant marriage exclusively limited to opposite-sex couples. The measure was unsuccessful.

== Demographics and marriage statistics ==
According to the Missouri Department of Health and Senior Services, 10,519 same-sex marriages were performed in the state between 2015 and 2023. Jackson County, St. Louis County and the city of St. Louis together accounted for about half of all same-sex marriages, while Greene, St. Charles, Boone, Clay, Jasper, Jefferson, and Cape Girardeau counties accounted for about one-fourth. Data for 2015 is incomplete as several counties continued to issue licenses with the terms "groom" and "bride" until they were updated for 2016. In 2015, the state recorded 471 marriages between two women and 255 marriages between two men. The median age at marriage was higher for same-sex spouses (39.9 years) than for opposite-sex spouses (30.3 years).

The 2020 U.S. census showed that there were 9,634 married same-sex couple households (3,978 male couples and 5,656 female couples) and 9,146 unmarried same-sex couple households in Missouri. As of 2023, Shelby County is the only county in Missouri where no same-sex marriage has taken place. The first same-sex marriages in Montgomery and Oregon counties were performed in 2019.

Number of marriages performed in Missouri
Year	Same-sex marriages			Opposite-sex marriages	Unspecified	Total marriages	% same-sex
Year	Female	Male	Total	Opposite-sex marriages	Unspecified	Total marriages	% same-sex
2016	974	603	1,577	39,965	205	41,747	3.78%
2017	833	450	1,283	38,981	52	40,316	3.18%
2018	749	409	1,158	38,187	347	39,692	3.23%
2019	710	358	1,166	35,112	456	36,734	3.17%
2020	749	344	1,093	33,216	116	34,425	3.18%
2021	780	372	1,152	35,978	124	37,254	3.09%
2022	854	393	1,247	34,766	90	36,103	3.45%
2023	760	357	1,117	34,103	176	35,396	3.16%

== Public opinion ==
Public opinion for same-sex marriage in Missouri
Poll source	Dates administered	Sample size	Margin of error	Support	Opposition	Do not know / refused
Public Religion Research Institute	February 28 – December 8, 2025	351 adults	?	57%	39%	4%
Public Religion Research Institute	March 13 – December 2, 2024	385 adults	?	61%	36%	3%
Public Religion Research Institute	March 9 – December 7, 2023	375 adults	?	61%	35%	4%
Public Religion Research Institute	March 11 – December 14, 2022	?	?	63%	36%	1%
Public Religion Research Institute	March 8 – November 9, 2021	?	?	65%	35%	<0.5%
Public Religion Research Institute	January 7 – December 20, 2020	816 adults	?	62%	33%	5%
Public Religion Research Institute	April 5 – December 23, 2017	1,505 adults	?	58%	35%	7%
Public Religion Research Institute	May 18, 2016 – January 10, 2017	2,171 adults	?	51%	41%	8%
Public Religion Research Institute	April 29, 2015 – January 7, 2016	1,761 adults	?	48%	45%	7%
Public Religion Research Institute	April 2, 2014 – January 4, 2015	1,102 adults	?	47%	44%	9%
New York Times/CBS News/YouGov	September 20 – October 1, 2014	1,226 likely voters	± 3.6%	41%	47%	12%
Public Policy Polling	May 24–27, 2012	602 voters	± 4.0%	36%	52%	12%
Public Policy Polling	September 9–12, 2011	632 voters	± 3.9%	32%	59%	9%

== See also ==
- LGBTQ rights in Missouri
- Same-sex marriage in the United States
