= Same-sex marriage in Florida =

Same-sex marriage has been legal in Florida since January 6, 2015, as a result of a series of court decisions that the state's same-sex marriage ban violated the U.S. Constitution. On August 21, 2014, the U.S. District Court for the Northern District of Florida ruled in Brenner v. Scott that the same-sex marriage ban was unconstitutional. The order was stayed temporarily. State attempts at extending the stay failed, with the U.S. Supreme Court denying further extension on December 19, 2014. In addition, a state court ruling in Pareto v. Ruvin allowed same-sex couples to obtain marriage licenses in Miami-Dade County on the afternoon of January 5, 2015. In another state case challenging the denial of marriage rights to same-sex couples, a Monroe County court in Huntsman v. Heavilin stayed enforcement of its decision pending appeal, and the stay expired on January 6, 2015. Florida was the 35th U.S. state to legalize same-sex marriage. Polling suggests that a majority of Florida residents support the legal recognition of same-sex marriage, with a 2024 Public Religion Research Institute poll showing that 64% of respondents supported same-sex marriage.

Previously, Florida had banned same-sex marriage both by statute since 1977 and in its State Constitution since 2008. Voters approved a constitutional amendment that banned both same-sex marriage and civil unions in 2008. In addition, the state added a prohibition on the recognition of marriages from other jurisdictions in 1997. The state also imposed criminal penalties on any county clerk who issued marriage licenses to same-sex couples. These laws, while unenforceable, remain on the books.

== Legal restrictions ==
=== Statutes ===
In 1977, following the success of the Save Our Children campaign in overturning an LGBT rights ordinance in Miami, the Florida Legislature enacted legislation banning same-sex marriage and adoption by gays and lesbians. Senator Curtis Peterson, a sponsor of the legislation, said it was designed to say "we are tired of you and wish you would go back in the closet." In 1997, the Florida Legislature overwhelmingly adopted its own Defense of Marriage Act, which stated marriage was the "union between one man and one woman" and barred the state from recognizing same-sex marriages performed in other states. Governor Lawton Chiles said: "I believe that, by and large, most Floridians are tolerant and will one day come to view a broader range of domestic partnerships as an acceptable part of life. But, that is not the case today." The bill became law without his signature. According to a legal opinion provided to the Florida Court Clerks' Association in December 2014 in anticipation of an injunction in the case of Brenner v. Scott, a clerk who issued marriage licenses to same-sex couples would face criminal penalties, a legal provision it called "apparently unique" to Florida. Penalties could include fines as high as $1,000 and up to a year in prison.

In August 2017, Senator Gary Farmer filed a bill to repeal the state's statutory ban on same-sex marriage, with a similar bill also introduced to the House by Representative David Richardson in November 2017. Similar measures were also introduced by Senator Tina Polsky in December 2022 and January 2025, and Senator Fabián Basabe in October 2023. However, all these bills died in committee. Another bill was introduced in December 2025 by Representative Fentrice Driskell.

=== Constitutional amendment ===
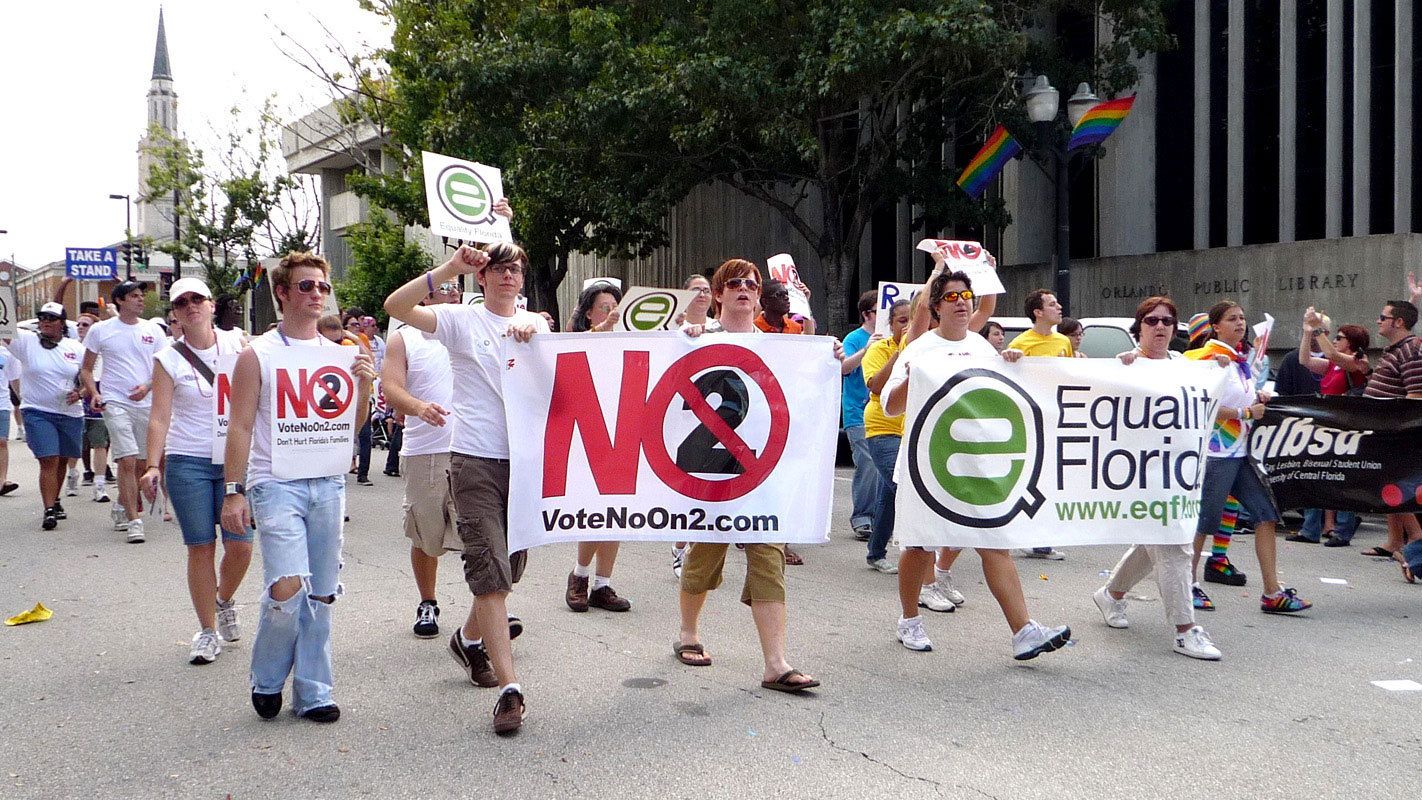
Activists urging voters to reject Amendment 2 in Orlando, 2008

On November 4, 2008, 62% of voters approved Amendment 2, a constitutional amendment banning same-sex marriage and civil unions. A 60% approval rate was required to adopt the amendment. Monroe County was the only county to oppose the amendment.

Get Engaged and Equal Marriage Florida, two organizations dedicated to overturning the constitutional amendment in the 2014 elections, were formed in 2013. However, no measure was placed on the 2014 ballot to repeal the same-sex marriage ban. In October 2023, Senator Basabe filed a constitutional amendment to repeal the ban. The measure would have required approval by voters in a referendum scheduled for November 2024, but it died without a hearing in a Senate subcommittee in February 2024.

== Lawsuits ==
Same-sex marriage in the United States

Several lawsuits for same-sex marriage rights were filed in federal and state courts in 2014 in the aftermath of the United States v. Windsor decision. Two courts ordered state officials to recognize a specific marriage established outside of Florida, a federal court in Brenner v. Scott, and a state court in Estate of Bangor.

=== Federal lawsuits ===
==== Wilson v. Ake ====
In January 2005, Judge James S. Moody Jr. of the U.S. District Court for the Middle District of Florida upheld the state's same-sex marriage ban and ruled against a same-sex couple who sought to have their Massachusetts marriage recognized in Florida.

==== Brenner v. Scott ====
On February 28, 2014, civil rights attorneys filed a lawsuit in the U.S. District Court for the Northern District of Florida on behalf of a Florida same-sex couple who had married in Canada. The case, Brenner v. Scott, was assigned to Judge Robert Lewis Hinkle. On March 13, 2014, attorneys for the American Civil Liberties Union (ACLU) filed a similar suit, Grimsley v. Scott, in the same court on behalf of South Florida LGBT advocacy group SAVE Dade and eight same-sex couples already married in other states, asking the court to order Florida to recognize their marriages. It named Governor Rick Scott and three other state officials as defendants. Judge Hinkle consolidated Brenner and Grimsley on April 21. On August 21, he ruled that Florida's statutory and constitutional bans on same-sex marriage were unconstitutional. He wrote:

This order holds that marriage is a fundamental right as that term is used in cases arising under the Fourteenth Amendment's Due Process and Equal Protection Clauses, that Florida's same-sex marriage provisions thus must be reviewed under strict scrutiny, and that, when so reviewed, the provisions are unconstitutional. [...] The institution of marriage survived when bans on interracial marriage were struck down, and the institution will survive when bans on same-sex marriage are struck down. Liberty, tolerance, and respect are not zero-sum concepts. Those who enter opposite-sex marriages are harmed not at all when others, including these plaintiffs, are given the liberty to choose their own life partners and are shown the respect that comes with formal marriage. Tolerating views with which one disagrees is a hallmark of civilized society.

He issued a stay pending appeal. He also granted immediate relief by ordering the state to recognize the marriage in New York in 2011 of the late Carol Goldwasser and plaintiff Arlene Goldberg and to revise the former's death certificate to reflect that marriage. The state defendants appealed to the Eleventh Circuit Court of Appeals and the case was retitled Brenner v. Armstrong. On December 3, the Eleventh Circuit denied a request to extend the stay from Hinkle's earlier ruling, and the U.S. Supreme Court on December 19 rejected Florida's request, with only Justices Antonin Scalia and Clarence Thomas dissenting. On January 1, 2015, Judge Hinkle clarified his order after one defendant, the county clerk of Washington County, inquired whether he was ordering her to issue more than the one marriage license specified in his preliminary injunction. Hinkle explained that his order applied only to the specific circumstances presented by the plaintiffs seeking relief, but that all Florida clerks should understand from his ruling that the U.S. Constitution required them to issue marriage licenses to same-sex couples. He warned that he was prepared to add additional plaintiffs and defendants to the lawsuit and that the costs would be borne by the defendants. Hinkle's stay expired on January 6, 2015, legalizing same-sex marriage in Florida.

More than a year after same-sex marriage began in Florida, Judge Hinkle issued a ruling that declared Florida's voter-approved amendment prohibiting same-sex marriage unconstitutional. On March 31, 2016, Hinkle issued a final injunction in the Brenner case, affirming the unconstitutionality of the now-defunct constitutional and statutory bans on same-sex marriage and clarifying the state government's requirement to treat same-sex couples equally in all aspects of Florida law. Judge Hinkle rejected the state's argument that summary judgment would be moot on the basis that the state government had shown little, if any, inclination to accept and follow the U.S. Supreme Court's ruling in Obergefell v. Hodges, which was decided on June 26, 2015.

=== State lawsuits ===
==== Early cases ====
Between 1993 and 2004, several same-sex couples filed suit in state courts seeking the right to marry. In June 1993, Shawna Underwood and Donia Davis, a lesbian couple from Orange County challenged Florida's statutory same-sex marriage ban in Underwood v. Florida. The lawsuit was voluntarily dismissed after extensive discussions with LGBT rights legal experts who suggested that Baehr v. Miike, a same-sex marriage case from Hawaii, would be a better first test on this issue. In 2001, the Florida Fifth District Court of Appeal ruled in Frandsen v. County of Brevard that the denial of marriage licenses to same-sex couples did not violate the State Constitution's equal protection for gender classifications. The San Francisco 2004 same-sex weddings prompted a flurry of similar attempts at same-sex marriage in Florida. On February 25, attorney Ellis Rubin filed suit in Broward County on behalf of 170 gays and lesbians who sought the right to marry. The suit, brought against Broward County Clerk Howard Forman was, according to the NBC News, "believed to be the first formal legal challenge to the state law specifying that marriage licenses be issued only to parties consisting of one male and one female." The suit was Ash v. Forman. Broward Circuit Judge Richard Eade rejected a bid by Liberty Counsel to intervene in support of the ban. The city of Key West passed a symbolic resolution in support of same-sex marriage in March 2004. On March 18, the Mayor of Tampa, Pam Iorio, signed an order, effective the following year, extending health care benefits to the domestic partners of city employees. Other cases were filed throughout the state: Clayton v. Ake in Hillsborough County, Merritt v. Gardner in Orange County, Berman v. Wilkin in Palm Beach County, and Kelley v. Green in Lee County. Liberty Counsel led counter suits against the couples in "a move designed to intimidate anyone suing for legal marriage", but they were later dropped. All the same-sex marriage cases were dismissed. A last case, Higgs v. Kolhage, brought in Monroe County, was dismissed in February 2006.

In March 1997, a three-judge panel of the Fifth District Court of Appeal affirmed a decision by Circuit Judge Edward M. Jackson in Posik v. Layton recognizing as enforceable a "nuptial-type agreement" between two women from Brevard County. The court pointed out that "[e]ven though the state has prohibited same-sex marriages and same-sex adoptions, it has not prohibited this type of agreement". The court ruled that the support agreement, which detailed that Layton would pay liquidated damages in the amount of $2,500 a month if the couple separated, was legally valid.

==== Pareto v. Ruvin ====
On January 21, 2014, six same-sex couples, some of whom had children or grandchildren, filed a lawsuit in the Eleventh Judicial Circuit Court of Florida, challenging the state's ban on same-sex marriage. The plaintiffs alleged an equal protection violation of their rights under the Fourteenth Amendment to the U.S. Constitution. The suit was organized by Equality Florida. It named Miami-Dade County Clerk Harvey Ruvin as defendant because his office had refused to issue marriage licenses to the couples. Miami-Dade Circuit Judge Sarah Zabel held a hearing in the case on July 2 and granted the plaintiffs' motion for summary judgment on July 25. She found that Florida's same-sex marriage ban and related statutes deprived couples due process and equal protection of the laws as guaranteed by the Fourteenth Amendment. She noted that under Florida Supreme Court precedent she needed to apply rational basis review to laws discriminating based on sexual orientation, but suggested the Florida Supreme Court revisit the question of the appropriate level of scrutiny on appeal. She stayed enforcement of her decision pending appeal. She lifted that stay on January 5, 2015, ordering Miami-Dade County to issue licenses to same-sex couples, which county officials began doing around noon that day. The first same-sex couples began marrying in the state on January 5, 2015. Catherina Pareto and Karla Arguello, plaintiffs in Pareto, were the first couple to marry in Florida. Same-sex couples from across the state began marrying the next day, on January 6, when Judge Hinkle's stay in the Brenner case expired.

==== Huntsman v. Heavilin ====
On April 1, 2014, plaintiffs Aaron Huntsman and William Lee Jones filed suit in the Sixteenth Judicial Circuit Court of Florida against Monroe County Clerk Amy Heavilin, after they were denied a marriage license. Chief Judge Luis Garcia held an initial hearing in the case, Huntsman v. Heavilin, on July 7. On July 17, Judge Garcia ruled in favor of the couple, overturning Florida's ban on same sex marriage. The judge, in declaring that Florida's same-sex marriage ban was unconstitutional under the Fourteenth Amendment, found that marriage was a fundamental right and that same-sex marriage could not be construed as a "new right". He found that Florida violated the plaintiffs' rights under both the Due Process and Equal Protection clauses of the Fourteenth Amendment, but that the plaintiffs lacked standing to raise the question of the recognition of same-sex marriages from other jurisdictions. He ordered Monroe County to issue marriage licenses to same-sex couples beginning on July 22, 2014. The Florida Attorney General, Pam Bondi, filed a notice of appeal with the Third District Court of Appeal the same day, which stayed enforcement of Garcia's ruling. Judge Garcia denied the plaintiffs' request to have the stay lifted, as did the Court of Appeal on July 23. The stay expired on January 6, 2015, and Huntsman and Jones were married that day at 12:01 a.m. at the Monroe County Courthouse.

==== Consolidated cases in Pareto and Huntsman ====
Attorney General Bondi appealed both cases to the Florida Third District Court of Appeal, where the cases were consolidated. On July 28, the same-sex couples asked the court to exercise "pass through" jurisdiction and allow the case to be heard directly by the Florida Supreme Court. On October 13, Bondi asked the Third District Court of Appeal to pass the consolidated case to the Florida Supreme Court, as the plaintiffs had earlier proposed. In light of the Brenner decision, the courts lifted their stays and same-sex couples began marrying in Florida.

=== State lawsuits seeking recognition of specific marriages ===
==== Estate of Bangor ====
Francis C. Bangor was a Pennsylvania resident who owned a winter home in Boynton Beach. Bangor and his spouse, William Simpson, entered into a civil union in Vermont in 2001 and married in Delaware in October 2013. Bangor died on March 15, 2014. He left a will that named Simpson as his executor, which Florida called a "personal representative". Florida law required a non-resident personal representative to be a relative of the decedent. Circuit Judge Diana Lewis held a hearing at which Simpson testified to his 37-year relationship with Bangor. The Attorney General was not represented. On August 5, she ruled that Simpson was entitled to be recognized as Bangor's surviving spouse, and that Florida's constitutional and statutory provisions prohibiting this recognition were unconstitutional as applied to this case. Lewis did not stay her order as three other circuit courts had in same-sex marriage cases. She issued Letters of Administration to Simpson, making Simpson and Bangor's marriage the first same-sex marriage recognized in Florida.

==== Shaw v. Shaw ====
On January 15, 2014, Mariama Shaw, a Tampa woman who had married her wife in Massachusetts, filed a petition for divorce in the Thirteenth Judicial Circuit. Shaw was seeking to have the state recognize her same-sex marriage for the purpose of granting a divorce. The spouses then entered into the collaborative divorce process, came to a full settlement agreement, and presented that agreement to the judge to ratify as part of a final judgment of divorce. After hearing arguments, the trial judge dismissed the petition, and the parties appealed. On August 27, on a 10 to 3 vote, the judges of the Second District Court of Appeal asked the Florida Supreme Court to settle the case, Shaw v. Shaw. The Supreme Court rejected that request on September 5. The divorce was granted by the Second District Court of Appeal on May 29, 2015.

==== Brassner v. Lade ====
Heather Brassner asked a state court to dissolve a civil union she had entered into with Megan Lade in Vermont in 2002. On August 4, 2014, Broward County Circuit Judge Dale Cohen ruled that Florida's denial of marriage rights to same-sex couples and its refusal to recognize same-sex marriages from other jurisdictions were unconstitutional. He stayed implementation of his decision allowing the divorce for 30 days pending appeal. Attorney General Bondi said the state did not appeal because it was not a party to the case, and Cohen scheduled a final divorce hearing for September 11. Beyond the one divorce, his ruling did not direct local officials to take any action, but the Broward County Clerk, Howard Forman, said he would decide during the week of September 7 whether to issue marriage licenses to same-sex couples based on Cohen's ruling. Before the final divorce hearing, Judge Cohen vacated his earlier ruling because Brassner's attorney had only notified the Attorney General of the constitutional challenge by email rather than by certified mail as required by Florida law. The Attorney General was properly served, and then intervened, and Cohen reissued his order on December 8. The judge issued his final judgment in the case on December 17, 2014, allowing the first same-sex divorce in Florida to be granted.

== Native American nations ==
The Indian Civil Rights Act primarily aims to protect the rights of Native Americans but also reinforces the principle of tribal self-governance. While it does not grant sovereignty, the Act affirms the authority of tribes to govern their own legal affairs. Consequently, many tribes in Florida have enacted their own marriage and family laws. As a result, the Brenner ruling and the Supreme Court's Obergefell ruling did not automatically apply to tribal jurisdictions. There are two federally recognized tribes in Florida: the Seminole Tribe of Florida and the Miccosukee Tribe of Indians of Florida. It is unclear if same-sex marriage is presently legal in these tribes.

Native Americans have deep-rooted marriage traditions, placing a strong emphasis on community, family and spiritual connections. Traditional Muscogee marriage ceremonies (etepvyetv) involve exchanges of gifts between spouses, feasting and dancing. As bride price, grooms would bring venison or meat, while brides would offer corn or beans, representing their contribution to the household. Elders (vculvkvlke) would wrap couples in a single blanket (vccetv), signifying their joining as one family. While there are no records of same-sex marriages being performed in Native American cultures in the way they are commonly defined in Western legal systems, many Indigenous communities recognize identities and relationships that may be placed on the LGBT spectrum. Among these are two-spirit individuals—people who embody both masculine and feminine qualities. In some cultures, two-spirit individuals assigned male at birth wear women's clothing and engage in household and artistic work associated with the feminine sphere. Historically, this identity sometimes allowed for unions between two people of the same biological sex. The Timucua recognized two-spirit individuals, who could be distinguished from both women and men by the color of the feathers in their hair. Their work in the community included hauling provisions for men going to war, preparing dead bodies for burial, and tending to people with contagious diseases. René Goulaine de Laudonnière reported in 1564 that he had encountered several Timucua two-spirit people, including one serving as an emissary of a Timucuan king. According to Jacques le Moyne, "because they were strong, [two-spirit people] accompanied warriors to battle, carrying provisions and tending to the injured." The Timucua were monogamous, but chiefs (atimoqua) sometimes had two or three wives. It is unclear if Timucua two-spirit people were allowed to marry. With regard to the Seminole, it is possible their society had a designation like two-spirit but a lot of traditional knowledge was lost in the aftermath of the Second Seminole War and the Trail of Tears for those Seminole forcibly removed to the Indian Territory. The modern Muscogee term poyvfekcv hokkolvn (pronounced [po.jəfɪ́ktʃə hok.kôːlɪn]) may be used by Seminole two-spirit individuals.

== Demographics and marriage statistics ==
Data from the 2000 U.S. census showed that 41,048 same-sex couples were living in Florida. By 2005, this had increased to 54,929 couples, likely attributed to same-sex couples' growing willingness to disclose their partnerships on government surveys. Same-sex couples lived in all counties of the state and constituted 1.2% of coupled households and 0.65% of all households in the state. Most couples lived in Broward, Miami-Dade and Palm Beach counties, but the county with the highest percentage of same-sex couples was Monroe (1.59% of all county households). Same-sex partners in Florida were on average younger than opposite-sex partners, and more likely to be employed. The average and median household incomes of same-sex couples were higher than different-sex couples, but same-sex couples were far less likely to own a home than opposite-sex partners. 17% of same-sex couples in Florida were raising children under the age of 18, with an estimated 17,010 children living in households headed by same-sex couples in 2005.

The 2020 U.S. census showed that there were 56,306 married same-sex couple households (30,096 male couples and 26,210 female couples) and 40,388 unmarried same-sex couple households in Florida.

== Public opinion ==
Public opinion for same-sex marriage in Florida
| Poll source | Dates administered | Sample size | Margin of error | Support | Opposition | Do not know / refused |
|---|---|---|---|---|---|---|
| Public Religion Research Institute | February 28 – December 8, 2025 | 1,385 adults | ? | 64% | 32% | 4% |
| Public Religion Research Institute | March 13 – December 2, 2024 | 1,387 adults | ? | 64% | 31% | 5% |
| Public Religion Research Institute | March 9 – December 7, 2023 | 1,375 adults | ? | 64% | 32% | 4% |
| Public Religion Research Institute | March 11 – December 14, 2022 | ? | ? | 69% | 28% | 3% |
| Public Religion Research Institute | March 8 – November 9, 2021 | ? | ? | 68% | 30% | 2% |
| Public Religion Research Institute | January 7 – December 20, 2020 | 3,613 adults | ? | 66% | 28% | 6% |
| Public Religion Research Institute | April 5 – December 23, 2017 | 4,374 adults | ? | 61% | 30% | 9% |
| Public Religion Research Institute | May 18, 2016 – January 10, 2017 | 6,076 adults | ? | 58% | 32% | 11% |
| Public Religion Research Institute | April 29, 2015 – January 7, 2016 | 4,917 adults | ? | 53% | 37% | 10% |
| Public Religion Research Institute | April 2, 2014 – January 4, 2015 | 3,625 adults | ? | 52% | 40% | 8% |
| New York Times/CBS News/YouGov | September 20 – October 1, 2014 | 5,689 likely voters | ± 1.7% | 46% | 40% | 14% |
| Quinnipiac University | April 23–28, 2014 | 1,413 registered voters | ± 2.6% | 56% | 39% | 5% |
| Public Policy Polling | January 16–21, 2014 | 591 primary voters | ± 4.0% | 47% | 44% | 9% |
| Public Religion Research Institute | November 12 – December 18, 2013 | 261 adults | ± 7.0% | 57% | 37% | 6% |
| StPetePolls | August 1–2, 2013 | 3,034 registered voters | ± 1.8% | 46% | 47% | 7% |
| Quinnipiac University | December 11–17, 2012 | 1,261 registered voters | ± 2.8% | 43% | 45% | 12% |
| The Washington Post | September 19–23, 2012 | 925 registered voters | ± 4.0% | 54% | 33% | 13% |
| Public Policy Polling | May 31 – June 3, 2012 | 642 voters | ± 3.9% | 42% | 45% | 13% |
| Public Policy Polling | June 16–19, 2011 | 848 voters | ± 3.4% | 37% | 53% | 10% |
| Strategic Vision | 2005 | 1,200 voters | ± 3.0% | 34% | 54% | 12% |
| Schroth & Associates | March 3–4, 2004 | 800 registered voters | ± 3.5% | 27% | 65% | 8% |

== See also ==
- Brenner v. Scott
- Recognition of same-sex unions in Florida
- LGBT rights in Florida
- Same-sex marriage in the United States
