= Limited Partnership (film) =

- Film poster
- Directed by: Thomas G. Miller
- Written by: Thomas G. Miller; Kirk Marcolina
- Produced by: Thomas G. Miller; Kirk Marcolina
- Cinematography: Nancy Huffman; Leo Chiang; Shana Hagan
- Edited by: Kirk Marcolina; Thomas G. Miller; Carl Pfirman; Monique Zavistovski
- Music by: Allyson Newman
- Release date: June 14, 2014 (LAFF)
- Running time: 74 minutes
- Country: United States
- Language: English

Limited Partnership is a 2014 American documentary film directed by Thomas G. Miller. Through archival footage and modern interviews, it covers a 40-year marriage between two gay rights activists in the US. It premiered at the 2014 Los Angeles Film Festival and aired on Independent Lens, a PBS program, in June 2015.

== Synopsis ==
Richard Adams, a Filipino-American, and Tony Sullivan, an Australian national, met in 1971 when Sullivan was in the United States on a tourist visa. After hearing about a county clerk in Boulder, Colorado, who was marrying same sex couples, the two were married in March 1975. However, the Immigration and Naturalization Service refused to recognize the marriage, and, in a rejection letter, used a homophobic slur. In the face of impending deportation, the couple sued the U.S. government. The resulting case, Adams v. Howerton, was decided against them. After the couple lived abroad, Adams subsequently helped Sullivan return to the US illegally.

== Interviews ==
- Richard Adams
- Tony Sullivan
- Cathy Adams
- Lavi S. Soloway
- Clela Rorex

== Production ==
Miller began documenting the couple in 2001. The documentary initially focused on four couples, but Miller found that Adams and Sullivan had the best story. Filming was sporadic during the Presidency of George W. Bush, as Miller surmised that gay rights legislation would be unlikely. Following later events that focused attention on same-sex marriage in the United States, such as California Proposition 8, Miller returned to filming.

== Release ==
Limited Partnership premiered at the Los Angeles Film Festival on June 14, 2014. The broadcast premiere was on Independent Lens on June 15, 2015.

== Reception ==
Stephen Farber of The Hollywood Reporter wrote, "This potent doc retrieves a fascinating chapter in LGBT history." Joanne Ostrow of The Denver Post called the film "both heartbreakingly sad and triumphant". June Thomas of Slate wrote that the film is "a powerful corrective to the historical ignorance many of us exhibit".
