= Domestic partnership in Florida =

Before the legalization of same-sex marriage in Florida in January 2015, same-sex couples were able to have their relationships recognized in some Florida localities that had established a legal status known as domestic partnership.

Same-sex marriage in Florida became legal on January 6, 2015, as a result of a temporary injunction issued by a U.S. district court in the case of Brenner v. Scott, in which the state's same-sex marriage ban had been found unconstitutional on August 21, 2014. On June 26, 2015, the Supreme Court of the United States, in a landmark decision, held it unconstitutional for states to ban same sex marriage. The Court Reasoned that the Fourteenth Amendment requires a state to license same sex marriages, as well as recognize same sex marriage licenses granted in other states.

== Local level ==
Map of Florida counties and cities that offer domestic partner benefits either county-wide or in particular cities. City offers domestic partner benefits County-wide partner benefits through domestic partnership County or city does not offer domestic partner benefits

Although there is no statewide recognition of domestic partnerships, more than half of the population of Florida lives in counties or cities that recognize domestic partnerships.

=== Counties ===
Nine of Florida's 67 counties recognize domestic partnerships.

- 1998: Monroe County
- 1999: Broward County
- 2006: Palm Beach County
- 2008: Miami-Dade County
- 2012: Orange County, Pinellas County, Volusia County
- 2013: Leon County, Sarasota County

=== Cities ===
1. Bay Harbor Islands
2. Clearwater
3. Gainesville
4. Hialeah
5. Juno Beach
6. Jupiter
7. Key West
8. Kissimmee
9. Lake Worth
10. Margate
11. Miami
12. Miami Beach
13. Miramar
14. North Miami
15. North Port
16. Orlando
17. Pembroke Pines
18. Pensacola
19. Punta Gorda
20. Sarasota
21. South Miami
22. St. Cloud
23. St. Petersburg
24. Tallahassee
25. Tampa
26. Tavares
27. Tequesta
28. Venice
29. West Palm Beach
30. Wilton Manors

=== Towns ===
1. Palm Beach

== Public opinion ==
March 2004 – Miami Herald and St. Petersburg Times Poll – 65% Oppose Same-Sex Marriage, Majority Support Civil Unions.
A poll conducted by The Miami Herald and St. Petersburg Times found that 65% of Floridians oppose same-sex marriage, while 27% are supportive and 8% are undecided. A majority, however, believe that same-sex couples should have equal rights as married heterosexual couples. Only 41% are supportive of President Bush's push for a constitutional ban on same-sex marriage.

July 2004 – Florida Times-Union and South Florida Sun-Sentinel Poll –
Only 2% Name Same-Sex Marriage As Most Important Issue In Presidential Election of 2004.
In a survey conducted by The Florida Times-Union and the South Florida Sun-Sentinel, 600 likely Florida voters were asked to name the most important issue determining their vote for president. 2% of those polled named same-sex marriage as their biggest concern, while 26% said it was jobs and the economy, 16% said the situation in Iraq, and 15% said the war on terrorism.

January 2009 - A January 2009 Quinnipiac poll found that 35% of Florida voters supported only civil unions and an additional 27% supported full marriage rights. 31% believed that same-sex couples should not receive any form of recognition.

March 2011 - A March 2011 survey by Public Policy Polling found that 28% of Florida voters supported the legalization of same-sex marriage, while 31% supported civil unions, 37% were against all legal recognition of same-sex couples, and 4% were unsure.

June 2011 - A June 2011 survey by Public Policy Polling found that 37% of Florida voters supported the legalization of same-sex marriage, while 53% opposed it and 10% were not sure. A separate question on the same survey found that 67% of Florida voters supported legal recognition of same-sex couples, with 33% supporting same-sex marriage, 34% supporting civil unions but not marriage, 31% opposing all legal recognition, and 1% not sure.

June 2012- A June 2012 Public Policy Polling poll found that only a slight plurality of Florida voters believe gay marriage should be illegal. The poll found that 42% of Florida voters supported the legalization of same-sex marriage, while 45% opposed it and 13% were not sure. A separate question on the same survey found that 72% of Florida voters supported legal recognition of same-sex couples, with 37% supporting same-sex marriage, 35% supporting civil unions but not marriage, 26% opposing all legal recognition, and 3% not sure. The same poll found that 61% of Florida Democrats support same sex marriage, while 26% oppose it.

An October 2012 Washington Post poll found wide support for gay marriage among Florida voters, reflecting the changing attitudes toward LGBT residents of the state. In the survey, 54% said that same sex marriage should be legal, while 33% were opposed. 13% had no opinion.

A December 2012 Quinnipiac poll found voters almost evenly divided on the issue of same sex marriage. 45% of Florida residents opposed it, while 43% were in favor of it. Whites(45/44), Hispanics(46/44), Democrats(58/31), Independents(47/40), College Graduates(53/36) were generally in favor of same sex marriage. Blacks(31/60), Republicans(23/66) and voters with no college degree(39/49) were more likely to be opposed to the idea.

A March 2013 Public Policy Polling survey found that 38% of Florida voters support same-sex marriage and 37% supported civil unions.

An August 2013 StPetePolls survey found voters evenly divided as well, with 46.3% in favor of allowing same-sex marriage and 46.9% against.

A December 2013 Public Religion Research Institute survey found that 57% of Florida residents support same-sex marriage, while 37% opposed, and 6% didn't know or refused to answer.

A January 2014 Public Policy Polling poll found 47% supporting gay marriage and 44% opposed, the first time the company had found a plurality supporting it.

An April 2014 Quinnipiac poll found 56% supported allowing same-sex couples to get married in Florida and 39% opposed with 5% unsure or refusing to answer.

An October 2014 SurveyUSA poll found 40% supported same-sex marriage, 28% supported no recognition for same-sex couples and 27% supported civil unions.

== See also ==
- Brenner v. Scott
- Same-sex marriage in Florida
- LGBT rights in Florida
- Civil union in the United States
- Domestic partnership in the United States
- Florida Amendment 2
- Same-sex marriage in the United States
- LGBT adoption
- We Are Dad, a documentary film about same sex adoption in Florida
