= 2008 Florida Amendment 2 =

Referendum on legally defining marriage as heterosexual

Amendment 2
- November 4, 2008
- Marriage Protection Amendment

Results
Choice	Votes	%
Yes	4,890,883	61.92%
No	3,008,026	38.08%
Valid votes	7,898,909	93.41%
Invalid or blank votes	557,420	6.59%
Total votes	8,456,329	100.00%
Registered voters/turnout	11,247,634	75.18%
County results
Yes
80–90%
70–80%
60–70%
50–60%
No
50–60%

Florida Amendment 2 is an amendment made to the constitution of the U.S. state of Florida in 2008. It added Article I, Section 27 to the constitution, which defines marriage as a union only between one man and one woman, and thus bans the creation of similar unions, such as civil unions or same-sex marriage. Since 2014, the measure was litigated in court and was struck down by multiple state courts in several counties of southern Florida. Same-sex marriage became legal in Florida when the decision in the federal case Brenner v. Scott found the amendments banning same-sex marriage (including Amendment 2) to be unconstitutional.

== Background ==
Florida previously had banned same-sex marriage on multiple occasions and upheld their decision on it through court. In 1977, Governor Reubin Askew signed a bill banning homosexuals from marrying & adoption. In 1997, the "Defense of Marriage Act" was enacted by the Florida legislature which again codified that marriage was between a man and a woman and prevented the state from recognizing any same-sex marriages performed out of the state.

Polling released in December 2003 found opposition to same-sex marriage in Florida at 65%. A Schroth & Associates poll, conducted March 3–4, 2004, found 65% of Floridians opposed same-sex marriage, 27% supported same-sex marriage and 8% didn't know or refused to answer, while 53% of Floridians supported civil unions, 39% opposed civil unions and 8% didn't know or refused to answer.

In 2005, the case Wilson v. Ake occurred at the United States District Court for the Middle District of Florida in which a lesbian couple attempted to have their same-sex marriage from Massachusetts recognized. The case resulted in judge James S. Moody Jr. upholding the same-sex marriage ban. Two Quinnipiac University Polling Institute polls, one conducted July 30 - August 6, 2007, found 35% of Floridians opposed any legal recognition of same-sex unions, 29% supported civil unions and 27% supported same-sex marriage, while another poll conducted September 2–4, 2008, found 35% of Floridians support civil unions, 31% opposed any legal recognition of same-sex unions and 27% supported same-sex marriage.

== Campaign ==
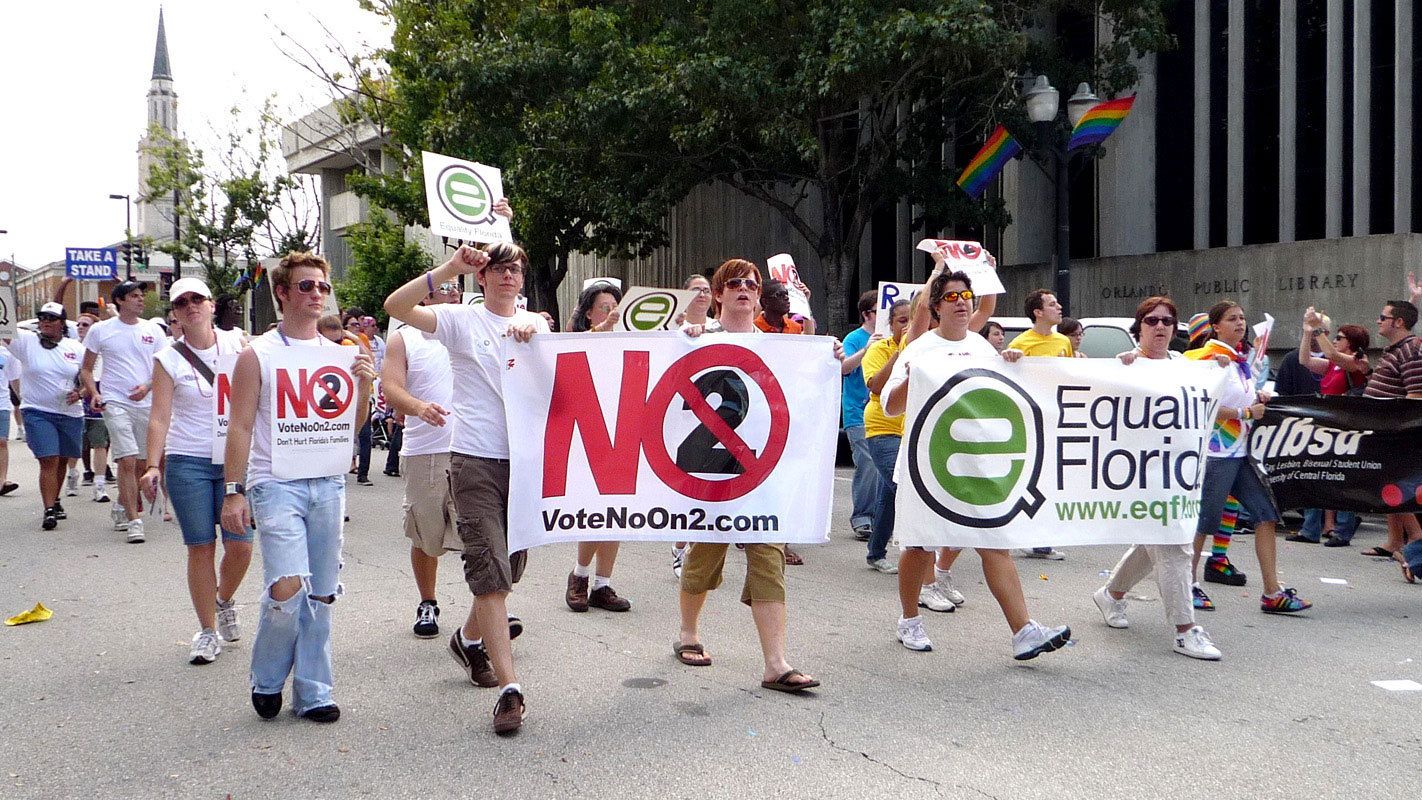
Activists with Equality Florida urging voters to oppose the amendment during the 2008 pride parade in Orlando

The amendment was proposed in an initiative by Florida4Marriage. Although same-sex marriage was already banned, some worried that a court case such as Wilson v. Ake could possibly overturn the same-sex marriage ban. Proposed constitutional amendments in Florida require 611,009 signatures, including at least 8% of voters in the last presidential election and at least 8% of voters in each congressional district of Florida. The initiative would later pass and be certified with 649,346 signatures and was placed on the ballot in February 2008. 60% of voters were required to pass the amendment in Florida.

Similar proposals were put to a vote at the same time in Arizona and California.

Voting for the amendment began on November 4, 2008.

== Results ==
Amendment 2
Choice	Votes	%
For	4,890,883	61.92
Against	3,008,026	38.08
Total	7,898,909	100.00
Valid votes	7,898,909	93.41
Invalid/blank votes	557,420	6.59
Total votes	8,456,329	100.00
Registered voters/turnout		75.18

On November 4, 2008, polls closed in the entire State of Florida at 7 pm CT and according to election reports that late evening via the St. Petersburg Times, Amendment 2 had passed. The amendment was ultimately passed with 61.92% in favor and 38.08% opposed. It won by a margin of 3.84%, as the amendment required electoral threshold of 60%. In the Florida 2008 election, Barack Obama voters as a whole voted 57% against Amendment 2 while John McCain voters voted 81% in favor of the legislation. Republican Governor Charlie Crist publicly supported Amendment 2. Monroe County was the only county to have a majority of the voters reject the amendment by a margin of 1,580 votes. Monroe County is home to a large LGBTQ community, particularly in Key West. Due to the influence of this community, Monroe County was the only county in Florida to reject 2008 Florida Amendment 2, which banned same-sex marriage and civil unions in the state. The amendment passed in the state with 60% of the vote. Florida joined California and Arizona, along with 26 previous states that approved other same-sex marriage bans such as this.

== Effects ==
Amendment 2 added Article I Section 27 of the Florida constitution. This states:

Inasmuch as marriage is the legal union of only one man and one woman as husband and wife, no other legal union that is treated as marriage or the substantial equivalent thereof shall be valid or recognized.

The amendment, which took effect on November 4, 2008, constitutionally banned same-sex marriages, which were never recognized by the state and was statutorily banned since 1977, and civil unions or civil union equivalents, which were never recognized by the state. Florida became the 27th US state to ban same-sex marriage in its constitution and 19th US state to ban civil unions or civil union equivalents in its constitution. This preempted the state judiciary from requiring the state to legally recognize same-sex marriages or civil unions or civil union equivalents and preempted the Florida Legislature from enacting a statute legalizing same-sex marriages or civil unions or civil union equivalents. Domestic partnerships in Florida, legal in 4 counties and 15 municipalities at the time, were unaffected by the amendment.

== Aftermath and legal challenges ==
Since the beginning of 2014, several couples and plaintiffs have sued the state of Florida over the amendment, as part of a larger, concentrated effort by gay rights activists and groups encouraged by the federal Supreme Court's decisions regarding marriage made the previous year. Multiple state lawsuits against the amendment have already been successful so far, succeeding in the amendment being struck down successively in Monroe, Miami-Dade, and Broward counties. On August 5, 2014, a Palm Beach County judge issued a ruling in a case pertaining to a surviving spouse's rights in a specific estate case which resulted in the union of a widow and her deceased wife as the first ever same-sex marriage officially recognized in Florida. Florida Attorney General Pam Bondi, a Republican up for reelection in 2014 considered vulnerable due to association with Governor Rick Scott, has been a staunch defender of the amendment in court. Critics have pointed to her two previous divorces as a cause for hypocrisy when compared to her statements about the sanctity of marriage. Bondi has appealed all state court rulings thus far, which, as required by Florida law, automatically stays the rulings until the beginning of the appeal process.

The rulings against the amendment have been welcome by gay rights groups, the activist gay community in southern Florida, both Democratic gubernatorial candidates, and it appears a majority of Floridians, as at least one recent poll by the conservative-leaning firm Quinnipiac now shows that 56% of likely voters now favor marriage equality, a near-total reversal since 2008. Concurrently with the lawsuits and rulings, a governor's race took place in 2014 and both leading candidates had completely opposite views on the issue of marriage. Incumbent Governor Rick Scott was opposed to marriage equality. Former governor and Democratic primary candidate Charlie Crist, who has changed parties since 2008, now supported same-sex marriage and ran on a platform that included giving same-sex couples the right to marry.

== Pre-decision opinion polls ==
Date of opinion poll	Conducted by	Sample size	In favor	Against	Undecided	Margin	Margin of Error	Source
Early November and/or late October 2008	Mason-Dixon Polling & Strategy	625 likely voters	56%	37%	?	19% pro	?	
October 31, 2008	Orlando Sentinel	625 registered voters	55%	35%	10%	20% pro	±4%	
October 20–22, 2008	St. Petersburg Times / Bay News 9 / Miami Herald	800 voters	59%	?	?	?	±3.5%	
October 20–21, 2008	Orlando Sentinel	625 registered voters	56%	37%	7%	19% pro	?	
October 20–21, 2008	Mason-Dixon Polling & Strategy	625 likely voters	57%	36%	7%	20% pro	±4%	
October 13–15, 2008	Research 2000	600 likely voters	53%	42%	5%	11% pro	±4%	
Early October 2008	Mason-Dixon Polling & Strategy	625 likely voters	55%	34%	?	21% pro	?	
September 14–17, 2008	SEA Polling and Strategic Design / Polling Co. / Miami Herald	800 registered voters	58%	37%	5%	21% pro	±3.5%	
September 2 – 4, 2008	Quinnipiac University	1,427 voters	55%	41%	4%	14% pro	±2.6%	
August 2008	Mason-Dixon Polling & Strategy	?	57%	?	?	?	?	
May 27 – June 1, 2008	Quinnipiac University	1,625 voters	58%	37%	4%	21% pro	±2.4%	

== See also ==
- LGBT rights in Florida
- Same-sex marriage in Florida
- Recognition of same-sex unions in Florida
