= Adams v. Howerton =

1982 U.S. legal decision

- Court: United States Court of Appeals for the Ninth Circuit
- Full case name: Richard Frank Adams, et al., v. Joseph D. Howerton
- Decided: February 25, 1982

Case history
- Prior action: Appeal from the C.D. Cal.
- Subsequent action: U.S. Supreme Court denied certiorari

Court membership
- Judges sitting: J. Clifford Wallace, Thomas Tang, Howard B. Turrentine

Case opinions
- Wallace

Keywords
- immigration, same-sex marriage

Adams v. Howerton, 673 F.2d 1036 (9th Cir. 1982), cert. denied, 458 U.S. 1111 (1982) is a decision from the United States Court of Appeals for the Ninth Circuit that held that the term "spouse" refers to an opposite-sex partner for the purposes of immigration law and that this definition met the standard at the time for rational basis review. It was the first U.S. lawsuit to seek recognition of a same-sex marriage by the federal government.

== Lawsuit ==
In 1975, Richard Frank Adams, an American citizen, and Anthony Corbett Sullivan, an immigrant from Australia, were one of several same-sex couples that received marriage licenses from the clerk of Boulder County, Colorado. Adams then petitioned the Immigration and Naturalization Service (INS) for classification of Sullivan as an immediate relative of Adams, on the basis that they were married under Colorado law. The petition was initially denied, with a letter stating that "[Adams and Sullivan] have failed to establish that a bona fide marital relationship can exist between two faggots." A revised letter was later sent, explaining that "[a] marriage between two males is invalid for immigration purposes and cannot be considered a bona fide marital relationship since neither party to the marriage can perform the female functions in marriage." After the INS petition was ultimately denied, they filed suit against the INS in the United States District Court for the Central District of California, alleging that their marriage was valid under both Colorado law and immigration law, and that failure to recognize its validity violated the Fifth Amendment's substantive due process and equal protection components.

The district court rejected the plaintiffs' claims, noting that "Congress in its immigration statutes is not obligated to follow the law of the place where the marriage was contracted". The court also held that under Colorado law marriage is a union of "a man and a woman", agreeing with the state attorney general's opinion, and also noted that "[t]he Colorado statutes don't specifically allow, nor do they specifically prohibit, marriages between persons of the same sex." It also held that "[t]he legal protection and special status afforded to marriage (being defined as a union of persons of different sex) has historically ... been rationalized as being for the purpose of encouraging the propagation of the race."

Regarding the constitutional claims, it held that if federal law governs, then "the constitutional challenge is rejected as insubstantial", because "Congress has virtually plenary power in immigration matters and is not bound by otherwise applicable equal protection requirements". If state law governs, the court held that "the Colorado state law which rejects a purported marriage between persons of the same sex does not violate the due process or the equal protection clause of the federal constitution", on the basis that the Supreme Court's decision in Baker v. Nelson, 409 U.S. 810, 34 L.E.2d 65, 93 S Ct 37 (1972), "is of paramount importance because a state court judgment prohibiting two people of the same sex from marrying each other was appealed to the U. S. Supreme Court on various constitutional grounds, including due process and equal protection. The High Court dismissed the appeal for want of a substantial federal question. Such a dismissal is an important adjudication on the merits." The court rejected the counterargument "that some persons are allowed to marry and their union is given full recognition and constitutional protection even though the above stated justification—procreation—is not possible" because "if the classification of the group who may validly marry is overinclusive, it does not affect the validity of the classification".

== Appeal ==
On appeal, a three-judge panel of the Ninth Circuit affirmed the District Court's opinion on alternative grounds on February 25, 1982. They decided that it was unnecessary for them to determine if the Adams-Sullivan union qualified as a marriage under Colorado law. They noted that it was clear that "Congress did not intend the mere validity of a marriage under state law to be controlling" and that "even though two persons contract a marriage valid under state law and are recognized as spouses by that state, they are not necessarily spouses for purposes of section 201(b)." They held that "[t]he term marriage ordinarily contemplates a relationship between a man and a woman" (internal quotations and citations omitted) and that "[t]he term spouse commonly refers to one of the parties in a marital relationship so defined. Congress has not indicated an intent to enlarge the ordinary meaning of those words. In the absence of such a congressional directive, it would be inappropriate for us to expand the meaning of the term spouse for immigration purposes" (internal quotations and citations omitted) and that "Congress intended that only partners in heterosexual marriages be considered spouses under section 201(b)."

In reviewing the constitutionality of the law, they rejected the plaintiffs' claim that strict scrutiny was required, on the grounds that "Congress has almost plenary power to admit or exclude aliens". They held that "Congress's decision to confer spouse status under section 201(b) only upon the parties to heterosexual marriages has a rational basis and therefore comports with the due process clause and its equal protection requirements. There is no occasion to consider in this case whether some lesser standard of review [than rational basis] should apply." They found it unnecessary to determine if Congress's justification "is because homosexual marriages never produce offspring, because they are not recognized in most, if in any, of the states, or because they violate traditional and often prevailing societal mores. In any event, having found that Congress rationally intended to deny preferential status to the spouses of such marriages, we need not further 'probe and test the justifications for the legislative decision.'"

The plaintiffs petitioned for a writ of certiorari to the United States Supreme Court, which denied the petition.

Sullivan appealed his deportation order arguing that it would cause him "extreme hardship". The Ninth Circuit rejected that argument on September 30, 1985, in a 2-1 decision in the case of Sullivan v. INS authored by Circuit Judge Anthony Kennedy, later an Associate Justice of the U.S. Supreme Court.

== The plaintiffs ==
Adams was born in Manila in the Philippines. His family moved to the United States when he was 12, and he grew up in Long Prairie, Minnesota. He studied liberal arts at the University of Minnesota. Adams became a naturalized U.S. citizen in 1968 and was living in Los Angeles, California, in 1971 when he met Anthony Corbett "Tony" Sullivan, an Australian citizen who was visiting the U.S. on a tourist visa. They were one of six gay couples granted marriage licenses by County Clerk Clela Rorex in Boulder, Colorado on April 21, 1975. They exchanged vows in a religious ceremony as well.

To publicize their lawsuit, they appeared on the Phil Donahue Show where, according to their attorney, "people in the audience said some pretty nasty things. But they withstood it all because they felt it was important to speak out."

After losing Sullivan's appeal of his deportation order in 1985 and being denied Adams' request for residency by Australia, in 1985 they couple traveled in Europe for a year. Adams later said: "It was the most difficult period because I had to leave my family as well as give up my job of 18 1/2 years. It was almost like death". They returned to the U.S., lived in Los Angeles, and avoided high-profile activism that might attract the attention of immigration authorities. Adams worked for a law firm as an administrator until his retirement in 2010. After retirement, Adams and Sullivan made some appearances at events supporting same-sex marriage.

Adams died at his Los Angeles home on December 17, 2012, after a short illness. Sullivan survived him. On April 21, 2014, on their 39th wedding anniversary, Sullivan filed a motion with the Los Angeles Field Office of U.S. Citizenship and Immigration Services (USCIS) to reopen and reconsider his late husband's petition for a marriage-based green card which that office had denied.

Limited Partnership, a documentary telling the couple's story, was released by Tesseract Films in 2014.

On January 5, 2014, the USCIS approved Adams' immigrant visa petition filed in 1975 on behalf of his husband. Sullivan received his green card in April 2016.

== United States v Windsor ==
The decision of the U.S. Supreme Court in United States v. Windsor in June 2013 established that the federal government treats the term spouse as gender-neutral. On July 1, 2013, Janet Napolitano, director of the Department of Homeland Security directed the U.S. Citizenship and Immigration Services to "review immigration visa petitions filed on behalf of a same-sex spouse in the same manner as those filed on behalf of an opposite-sex spouse."
