= Richard Adams (activist) =

Filipino-American gay rights activist

- Born: Richard Frank Adams; March 9, 1947
- Died: December 17, 2012 (aged 65)

Richard Frank Adams (March 9, 1947 – December 17, 2012) was a Filipino-American gay rights activist. After his 1975 same-sex marriage was declared invalid for the purposes of granting his husband permanent residency, Adams filed the federal lawsuit Adams v. Howerton. This was the first lawsuit in America to seek recognition of a same-sex marriage by the federal government.

== Life and career ==
Adams was born in Manila in the Philippines. His family moved to the United States when he was 12, and he grew up in Long Prairie, Minnesota. He studied liberal arts at the University of Minnesota. Adams became a naturalized U.S. citizen in 1968 and lived in Los Angeles, California where he met Australian citizen Anthony Corbett "Tony" Sullivan in 1971. They were issued a marriage license along with five other gay couples by Boulder County Clerk Clela Rorex in Boulder, Colorado on April 21, 1975. They were married by Rev. Elder Freda Smith, a minister of the Metropolitan Community Church (MCC), and Rev. Robert Sirico, now a Catholic priest but then MCC clergy. The event was witnessed by Rev. Charlie Arehart, pastor of MCC of the Rockies in Denver, and Frank Zerilli, Rev. Troy Perry's long-time assistant.

In 1975, the couple applied with the Immigration and Naturalization Service (INS) for Sullivan to be granted permanent residency as a citizen's spouse. The petition was initially denied, with a letter stating that "[Adams and Sullivan] have failed to establish that a bona fide marital relationship can exist between two faggots." A revised letter was later sent after they filed a formal protest, explaining that "[a] marriage between two males is invalid for immigration purposes and cannot be considered a bona fide marital relationship since neither party to the marriage can perform the female functions in marriage."

They sued the INS in 1979, but a federal district judge upheld the INS decision. They also lost their appeals. They later filed a second suit arguing that Sullivan's deportation after the couple had been together for 8 years constituted an "extreme hardship." The U.S. 9th Circuit Court of Appeals rejected their claims, making it possible for Sullivan to be deported. Following that loss, they traveled in Europe for a year, but they eventually returned to the U.S. and stopped doing high-profile activism to avoid attention from immigration authorities. Adams worked as an administrator for a law firm until his retirement in 2010. After retirement, Adams and Sullivan made some appearances at events supporting gay marriage. They are featured in the documentary Limited Partnership, which was released by Tesseract Films in 2014.

Adams died of cancer in Los Angeles in December 2012. On April 21, 2014, on their 39th wedding anniversary, Sullivan filed a motion with the Los Angeles Field Office of U.S. Citizenship and Immigration Services (USCIS) to reopen and reconsider Adams' petition for a marriage-based green card.

On January 5, 2014, the USCIS approved Adams' immigrant visa petition filed in 1975 on behalf of his husband. Sullivan received his green card on April 21, 2016.

== See also ==
- Limited Partnership, a 2014 documentary film about Adams and Sullivan
