= 2014 Florida elections =

Elections were held in Florida on November 4, 2014.

== State elections ==
=== Governor and Lieutenant Governor ===
Incumbent Republican Governor Rick Scott and Lieutenant Governor Carlos López-Cantera sought re-election. Scott faced Elizabeth Cuevas-Neunder, a conservative activist and candidate for governor in 1998 and Yinka Adeshina, a pharmacist, in the Republican primary. Scott and López-Cantera faced former Republican governor and independent candidate for Senate in 2010 Democrat Charlie Crist and Annette Taddeo-Goldstein in the general election. Scott was re-elected to a second term.

=== Attorney General ===
Incumbent Republican Attorney General Pam Bondi sought re-election and won the Republican primary unopposed. Other candidates include Democrats George Sheldon, former Assistant U.S. Secretary of Health and Human Services for Children and Families and Perry Thurston, Minority Leader of the Florida House of Representatives. Sheldon won the primary, but lost the general election to Bondi.

=== State Commissioner of Agriculture ===
Incumbent Republican Commissioner of Agriculture Adam Putnam sought re-election and won the Republican primary unopposed. Democrat Thad Hamilton, Broward County Soil and Water Conservation District supervisor and Independent candidate for Commissioner of Agriculture in 2010 won the Democratic primary unopposed. Putnam was re-elected to a second term.

=== State Chief Financial Officer ===
Incumbent Republican Chief Financial Officer Jeff Atwater sought re-election and won the Republican primary unopposed. He faced Democrat Will Rankin, a former Ohio Treasury officer and businessman, in the general election. Atwater was re-elected to a second term.

=== Florida Senate ===
20 of the 40 seats in the Florida Senate were up for election. The Republican Party of Florida won a majority of seats.

=== Florida House of Representatives ===
The Republican Party of Florida won a majority of seats.

== Federal elections ==
=== United States House of Representatives ===
All of Florida's twenty-seven seats in the United States House of Representatives were up for election. Gwen Graham defeated incumbent Steve Southerland in Florida's 2nd congressional district. Carlos Curbelo defeated incumbent Joe Garcia in Florida's 26th congressional district. No other seats changed hand.
