= Brenner v. Scott =

2014 U.S. District Court case overturning Florida's gay marriage bans

Brenner v. Scott Grimsley v. Scott
- Court: U.S. District Court for the Northern District of Florida
- Decided: August 21, 2014
- Citation: 999 F. Supp. 2d 1278

Case history
- Prior actions: Northern District of Florida: Apr. 21, 2014: Cases ordered consolidated.
- Subsequent actions: U.S. Eleventh Circuit: Sep. 19, 2014: Appealed as Brenner v. Armstrong, No. 14-14061 and -14066, briefing ordered.

Holding
- Florida's statutory and constitutional bans on same-sex marriage are unconstitutional as they violate the Fourteenth Amendment's Due Process and Equal Protection Clauses.

Court membership
- Judges sitting: Robert L. Hinkle, U.S.D.J.

Keywords
- Same-sex marriage

In Brenner v. Scott and its companion case, Grimsley v. Scott, a U.S. district court found Florida's constitutional and statutory bans on same-sex marriage unconstitutional. On August 21, 2014, the court issued a preliminary injunction that prevented that state from enforcing its bans and then stayed its injunction until stays were lifted in the three same-sex marriage cases then petitioning for a writ of certiorari in the U.S. Supreme Court–Bostic, Bishop, and Kitchen–and for 91 days thereafter. When the district court's preliminary injunction took effect on January 6, 2015, enforcement of Florida's bans on same-sex marriage ended.

The state defendants appealed to the Eleventh Circuit Court of Appeals, where it was styled Brenner v. Armstrong.

== District court proceedings ==
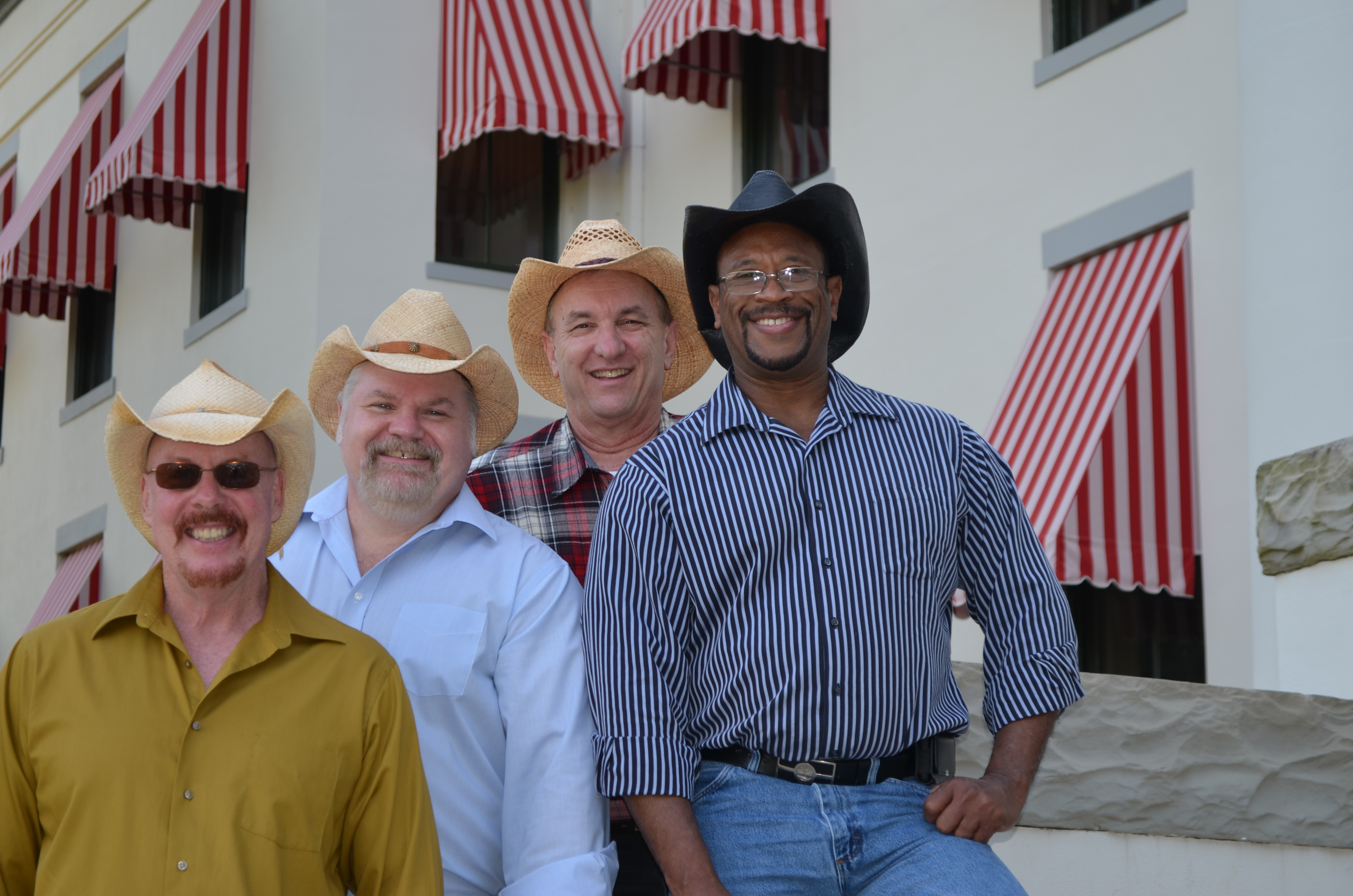
Pictured here are the plaintiffs in the same-gender marriage lawsuit. From left to right- Steve Schlairet, Chuck Jones, James Brenner, Ozzie Russ.

Civil rights attorneys Bill Sheppard (Sheppard, White, Kachergus, & DeMaggio, PA) and Sam Jacobson (Bledsoe, Jacobson, Schmidt, Wright, & Wilkinson) filed Brenner v. Scott on behalf of a Leon County, Florida, same-sex couple seeking to have their Canadian marriage recognized by the state. Both plaintiffs in this case are state employees; James Brenner works for the state Forest Service and Charles Jones works in the state Department of Education. They complained of being unable to designate each other as a spouse in the state retirement benefits program because of Florida's non-recognition of and refusal to license same-sex marriages. A second couple (Steven Schlairet and Ozzie Russ) were added to the Brenner suit on March 16, 2014. Steven is a retired hospital administrator, and Ozzie manages a local fast food restaurant. This couple sought to obtain a marriage license from the Washington County Court House, in Chipley, Florida. As a result of the Clerk of Courts' refusal to issue the marriage license to the couple, they joined the Brenner lawsuit.

Civil rights attorneys and the American Civil Liberties Union (ACLU) filed Grimsley v. Scott on behalf of South Florida-based LGBT-advocacy group SAVE and eight same-sex couples seeking recognition of their marriages legally established in other jurisdictions.

Both cases were filed in the U.S. District Court for the Northern District of Florida and assigned to U.S. District Judge Robert Lewis Hinkle. Brenner was initially filed on February 28, 2014, and Grimsley on March 13, 2014. Each case names Florida Governor Rick Scott as the lead defendant. On April 21, 2014, Judge Hinkle ordered the Brenner and Grimsley cases consolidated for case-management purposes, though they remain separate on the docket.

=== Ruling ===
On August 21, 2014, Judge Hinkle issued a ruling in Brenner and Grimsley that granted the same-sex couple plaintiffs' motion for a preliminary injunction. In ordering the injunction, Judge Hinkle found that Florida's statutory and constitutional bans on same-sex marriage were unconstitutional:

This order holds that marriage is a fundamental right as that term is used in cases arising under the Fourteenth Amendment's Due Process and Equal Protection Clauses, that Florida's same-sex marriage provisions thus must be reviewed under strict scrutiny, and that, when so reviewed, the provisions are unconstitutional.

Judge Hinkle added:

The institution of marriage survived when bans on interracial marriage were struck down, and the institution will survive when bans on same-sex marriage are struck down. Liberty, tolerance, and respect are not zero-sum concepts. Those who enter opposite-sex marriages are harmed not at all when others, including these plaintiffs, are given the liberty to choose their own life partners and are shown the respect that comes with formal marriage. Tolerating views with which one disagrees is a hallmark of civilized society.

=== Stay of injunction ===
Judge Hinkle's injunction ordered the Secretary of the Florida Department of Management Services and the Florida Surgeon General "and their officers, agents, servants, employees, and attorneys" to cease enforcing Florida's ban on same-sex marriage. It also ordered the Clerk of Court of Washington County to issue a marriage license to two of the plaintiffs. He issued a temporary stay of his preliminary injunction, pending resolution of the three same-sex marriage cases that were then petitioning for a writ of certiorari before the U.S. Supreme Court, and for 91 days thereafter: Bostic v. Schaefer, Bishop v. Smith, and Kitchen v. Herbert. He also removed the governor and attorney general as defendants.

In a separate part of his injunction, which he did not stay, he ordered the state to revise the death certificate of Carol Goldwasser to include the name of her wife, Arlene Goldberg, one of the plaintiffs. They had married in New York in 2011.

On October 7, 2014, following the U.S. Supreme Court's rejection the previous day of certiorari in Bostic, Bishop, and Kitchen, the Brenner and Grimsley plaintiffs filed separate motions asking Judge Hinkle to lift his stay before the 91-day period under the original order expired. The state defendants indicated that they object to lifting the stay. Judge Hinkle rejected that request on November 5, and on November 19 the state asked the Eleventh Circuit to extend Hinkle's stay pending appeal. An Eleventh Circuit panel of Frank Hull, Charles Wilson, and Adalberto Jordan denied that request on December 3.

On December 15, the state asked Justice Clarence Thomas, as Circuit Justice for the Eleventh Circuit, to stay Hinkle's preliminary injunction. Attorney General Pam Bondi based her request on the need to maintain statewide uniformity, noting Hinkle's injunction was directed to just one of Florida's sixty-seven clerks of court. Justice Thomas referred the request to the full court which, on December 19, rejected Florida's request with Justices Scalia and Thomas dissenting for the record.

On December 23, the Washington County Clerk of Court, whom Hinkle's injunction ordered to issue a marriage license to one of the plaintiff couples, filed an emergency request asking Hinkle if she was also required to issue marriage licenses to all qualified same-sex couples once his injunction took effect. On December 24, Judge Hinkle issued an order in which he noted that his injunction applied to the Secretary of the Department of Management Services, the Surgeon General, "and their officers, agents, servants, employees, and attorneys—and others in active concert or participation with any of them". He gave the Secretary until December 29 to explain whether he believes the injunction as written applies to each court clerk. Two briefs for the plaintiff same-sex couples told the court that all Florida clerks of court act "in concert" with the state defendants, that the statute that penalizes a clerk for issuing a marriage license to a same-sex couple was unenforceable because it was based on the statute the court ruled unconstitutional, and that the court could extend its order to cover all Florida clerks if necessary. In the brief for the Secretary of DMS, Attorney General Bondi said the court could make its order more specific and that a clerk is an "independent constitutional officer" not subject to the Secretary. An amicus brief filed by Florida Family Action said that the injunction as written applied to one clerk and that the district court lacked jurisdiction to modify it since the case had been appealed. On January 1, 2015, Judge Hinkle explained the scope of his injunction, writing that the Constitution rather than his order authorizes all Florida clerks to issue licenses to same-sex couples and that while clerks are free to interpret his ruling differently they should anticipate lawsuits if they fail to issue such licenses.

In response, the law firm advising the Florida Association of Court Clerks reversed its earlier position and recommended that all clerks issue marriage licenses to same-sex couples. Between the time of Judge Hinkle's decision and its implementation, clerks in thirteen counties–Baker, Calhoun, Clay, Duval, Franklin, Holmes, Jackson, Liberty, Okaloosa, Pasco, Santa Rosa, Wakulla, and Washington–announced they would issue such licenses but no longer provide courthouse wedding services to avoid having to officiate at the wedding of a same-sex couple.

Hinkle's stay expired on January 6, 2015, and same-sex marriage became legal throughout Florida.

== Court of Appeals proceedings ==
With Scott removed as a defendant, Dr. John H. Armstrong, the state's Surgeon General and Secretary of Health became the lead defendant and the case Brenner v. Armstrong. He and the remaining defendants appealed to the Eleventh U.S. Circuit Court of Appeals. All briefings were completed in December 2014 when the state declined its right to reply to the plaintiffs. On February 4, 2015, the Eleventh Circuit Court of Appeals put its same-sex marriage cases on hold until the Supreme Court rules in pending cases.

The state of Florida has dropped their appeal in the Brenner v. Armstrong case with the 11th Circuit Court of Appeals. Despite same-sex marriage being legal in Florida, as of February 2016 the case is still awaiting a final injunction order in the Northern District Court from Judge Hinkle.

Judge Hinkle issued his final order in the case on March 30, 2016. Hinkle's summary judgment affirmed the unconstitutionality of Florida's now defunct ban on same-sex marriage and explicitly ordered the state government to ensure equal treatment of same-sex couples in all areas of Florida law.

== U.S. Supreme Court ==
On October 6, 2014, the U.S. Supreme Court denied certiorari without recorded dissent in all the cases it had been asked to consider from appellate courts in the Fourth, Seventh, and Tenth Circuits, allowing the circuit court decisions striking down marriage bans to stand. The cases were: Bogan v. Baskin (Indiana); Walker v. Wolf (Wisconsin); Herbert v. Kitchen (Utah); McQuigg v. Bostic (Virginia); Rainey v. Bostic (Virginia); Schaefer v. Bostic (Virginia); and Smith v. Bishop (Oklahoma). This effectively started the clock ticking on Judge Hinkle's decision in the Northern District of Florida, 91 days from this date his stay would lift unless the state of Florida was able to get the 11th Circuit Court of Appeals or the Supreme Court to extend the stay. On November 13, commenting in an unrelated case on behalf of himself and Justice Antonin Scalia, Justice Clarence Thomas wrote that the Supreme Court "often review[s] decisions striking down state laws, even in the absence of a disagreement among lower courts.... But for reasons that escape me, we have not done so with any consistency, especially in recent months". He referenced denials of certiorari or denials of a stay in Herbert, Bishop, Bostic, Walker v. Wolf, Otter v. Latta, and Parnell v. Hamby.

The Supreme Court rejected a petition for certiorari before judgment in Robicheaux v. George (Louisiana) on January 12, 2015, and on January 16 agreed to hear the appeal in the four cases from the Sixth Circuit, consolidating them as one case titled Obergefell v. Hodges. It presented these questions to the parties:

1. Does the Fourteenth Amendment require a state to license a marriage between two people of the same sex?
2. Does the Fourteenth Amendment require a state to recognize a marriage between two people of the same sex when their marriage was lawfully licensed and performed out-of-state?

The court heard oral arguments on April 28. On June 26, 2015, the Supreme Court answered both questions in the affirmative.

Bourke v. Beshear and Love v. Beshear (Kentucky)
Filed on July 26, 2013; the U.S. district court found the state's refusal to recognize same-sex marriages from other jurisdictions an unconstitutional violation of the equal protection clause. Additional plaintiffs joined the lawsuit to challenge the state's denial of marriage licenses to same-sex couples. On July 1, 2014, U.S. District Judge John G. Heyburn II ruled that Kentucky's denial of marriage licenses to same-sex couples violates the equal protection clause. He found that homosexual persons constitute a suspect class deserving heightened scrutiny and suggested the Sixth Circuit should adopt that standard of review. He found Kentucky's ban did not withstand even rational basis review. The Sixth Circuit reversed the district court and upheld Kentucky's ban on same sex marriage on November 6. The couples filed an application for certiorari with the U.S. Supreme Court on November 17, which Governor Beshear supported on December 9.

DeBoer v. Snyder (Michigan)
Filed on January 23, 2012; the U.S. district court found that the state's ban violates the equal protection clause, 973 F. Supp. 2d 757 (E.D. Mich.) on March 21, 2014. The Sixth Circuit reversed the district court and upheld Michigan's ban on same sex marriage on November 6 and the same-sex couples filed an application for certiorari with the U.S. Supreme Court on November 17, which Attorney General Bill Schuette supported on November 24,

Obergefell v. Hodges (Ohio)
In a case filed on July 19, 2013, the U.S. district court found that the state ban on same-sex marriage violates the due process clause, for the limited purpose of issuing death certificates. In a second case, on February 10, 2014, four same-sex couples legally married in other states asked a U.S. district court to require Ohio to record the names of both same-sex parents on their children's birth certificates. They amended their suit to challenge the state's denial of marriage rights to same-sex couples. On April 14, 2014, District Court Judge Timothy Black found for the plaintiffs. On May 29, 2014, the Sixth Circuit consolidated Obergefell and Henry. The Sixth Circuit reversed the district court and upheld Ohio's ban on same sex marriage on November 6, and the same-sex couples filed an application for certiorari with the U.S. Supreme Court on November 14, which Ohio state officials endorsed on December 12.

Tanco v. Haslam (Tennessee)
Filed on October 21, 2013; the U.S. district court on March 14, 2014, required Tennessee to recognize the three plaintiff same-sex couples' out-of-state marriages until the court disposes of the case. The Sixth Circuit stayed that ruling. The Sixth Circuit reversed the district court and upheld Tennessee's ban on same sex marriage on November 6. The same-sex couples filed an application for certiorari with the U.S. Supreme Court on November 14, which Tennessee officials opposed on December 15.

== See also ==
- LGBT rights in Florida
- Same-sex marriage in Florida
- Same-sex marriage in the United States
