= LGBTQ rights in Florida =

- Florida (US)
- Legal status: Legal since 2003
- Gender identity: Restricted since 2024 - Criminal penalties
- Discrimination protections: Protections in employment, housing and public accommodations

Family rights
- Recognition of relationships: Same-sex marriage since 2015
- Adoption: Full adoption rights since 2010

Lesbian, gay, bisexual, and transgender (LGBTQ) people in the U.S. state of Florida have federal protections, but many face some legal challenges on the state level that are not experienced by non-LGBT residents. Same-sex sexual activity became legal in the state after the U.S. Supreme Court's decision in Lawrence v. Texas on June 26, 2003, and the state's sodomy law was repealed in 2026. Same-sex marriage has been legal in the state since January 6, 2015. Discrimination on account of sexual orientation and gender identity in employment, housing and public accommodations is outlawed following the U.S. Supreme Court's ruling in Bostock v. Clayton County. In addition, several cities and counties, comprising about 55 percent of Florida's population, have enacted anti-discrimination ordinances. These include Jacksonville, Miami, Tampa, Orlando, St. Petersburg, Tallahassee and West Palm Beach, among others. Conversion therapy is also banned in a number of cities in the state, mainly in the Miami metropolitan area, but has been struck down by the 11th Circuit Court of Appeals. In September 2023, Lake Worth Beach, Florida became an official "LGBTQ sanctuary city" to protect and defend LGBTQ rights.

Since 2021, under the leadership of Governor Ron DeSantis, the state has seen a significant erosion in LGBTQ rights, and especially transgender rights. In June 2021, a bill was passed preventing transgender women and girls from participating in female sports in schools. In April 2023, Florida LGBTQ advocacy group Equality Florida issued a travel advisory for LGBTQ people to avoid visiting or moving to the state. The following May, the Human Rights Campaign signed on to the travel advisory, citing legislation recently signed by Governor DeSantis, while stopping short of calling for a boycott of the state.

In May 2023, several bills were signed by DeSantis, which prohibited access to hormone replacement therapy for transgender minors and created barriers to accessing hormone replacement therapy for adults, including banning insurance coverage for such treatments and requiring a physician to administer the treatment rather than a nurse practitioner. Furthermore, the bills allow for transgender individuals using a restroom consistent with their gender identity in a public building to be charged with criminal trespass, expand the Parental Rights in Education Act, enable medical practitioners to deny service based on personal belief, and restrict "adult live performances" anywhere a child might be present (notably targeting drag performances, as claimed by DeSantis). In April 2026, the state passed a bill that will prohibit state and local governments from promoting or funding efforts classified as diversity, equity, and inclusion (DEI)—including LGBTQ organizations and events.

== Legality of same-sex sexual activity ==
After Florida became a territory of the United States in 1821, the Territorial Legislature enacted laws against fornication, adultery, bigamy, and incest, as well as against "open lewdness, or ... any notorious act of public indecency, tending to debauch the morals of society." Florida's first specific sodomy law, which was enacted in 1868 and made sodomy a felony, read: "Whoever commits the abominable and detestable crime against nature, either with mankind or with beast, shall be punished by imprisonment in the state prison not exceeding twenty years." In 1917, the Florida Legislature added a lesser crime, a second-degree misdemeanor: "Whoever commits any unnatural and lascivious act with another person shall be punished by fine not exceeding five hundred dollars, or by imprisonment not exceeding six months."

Florida courts interpreted the 1868 law to prohibit all sexual activity between two men or two women. It also prohibited oral sex and anal sex between heterosexual partners. In 1971, the Florida Supreme Court, ruling in Franklin v. State, struck down the "crime against nature" statute as unconstitutionally vague. The court retained the state's prohibition on sodomy by ruling that anal and oral sex could still be prosecuted under the lesser charge of "lewd and lascivious" conduct. Florida further enacted a "psychopathic offender law" in 1955, under which those convicted of sodomy (labelled as "criminal sexual psychopathic persons") would be periodically examined to determine if they had "improved to a degree that [they] will not be a menace to others". The law was repealed in 1979.

In 1960, the state Attorney General issued an opinion that Florida's sodomy statute did not apply to Indian reservations. The opinion stated that crimes committed between Native Americans or between Native Americans and non-Native Americans were a matter for tribal courts. This meant that if the particular reservation had no law against it, sodomy would be legal on the reservation. However, sodomy between non-Native Americans on the reservation would fall under the jurisdiction of state law and would be liable to prosecution.

Same-sex sexual activity remained illegal in Florida until 2003, when the United States Supreme Court struck down all state sodomy laws in Lawrence v. Texas. As of 2020, the state's sodomy law, though unenforceable, has not been repealed by the Florida Legislature.

In October 2018, during a gay sex undercover sting operation by Florida law enforcement, a judge ruled that gay sex is not illegal in a public space so long as it is within a room.

In September 2020, Hillsborough County officials arrested 11 men on misdemeanor charges. Each of the 11 men had gone to a local park and struck up a conversation with another man with both eventually agreeing to having consensual sex. They were arrested on misdemeanor charges that do not involve sex crimes. The Hillsborough County Sheriff's Office published the names and mugshots of all 11 men to local news outlets. Critics accused the Sheriff's Office of deliberately targeting gay men, asking if undercover deputies would have also arrested a man and a woman for meeting in public and agreeing to have sex.

In 2026, the Florida Legislature passed CS/CS/HB 1525, which repealed § 800.02, Florida Statutes, the state's statutory prohibition on "unnatural and lascivious acts"; the House of Representatives passed the bill 108–0 on March 3, 2026, and the Senate passed it 38–0 on March 10, 2026. Governor Ron DeSantis signed the bill on June 16, 2026, and the repeal took effect on October 1, 2026.

== Recognition of same-sex relationships ==
In 1977, Florida enacted a law banning same-sex marriage.

Furthermore, in November 2008, 61.9 percent of residents voted for Florida Amendment 2, and since then the Florida Constitution has banned same-sex marriage and civil unions. The amendment added Article I Section 27 to the Florida Constitution, which says:

Inasmuch as marriage is the legal union of only one man and one woman as husband and wife, no other legal union that is treated as marriage or the substantial equivalent thereof shall be valid or recognized.

A U.S. district court ruled on August 21, 2014, in Brenner v. Scott, that Florida's same-sex marriage ban was in violation of the Constitution of the United States. As a result of that ruling, same-sex marriage has been legal in the state since the court's temporary injunction took effect on January 6, 2015. Judge Robert Lewis Hinkle wrote:

This order holds that marriage is a fundamental right as that term is used in cases arising under the Fourteenth Amendment's Due Process and Equal Protection Clauses, that Florida's same-sex marriage provisions thus must be reviewed under strict scrutiny, and that, when so reviewed, the provisions are unconstitutional.

Nine counties, thirty cities, and one town in Florida offer domestic partnership benefits to same-sex couples.

In March 2016, a bill passed the Florida House of Representatives by a vote of 112–5 and the Senate by a vote of 38–0 to repeal a 1868 ban on cohabitation between unmarried couples. Governor Rick Scott signed the bill into law on April 6, 2016, and it went into effect on July 1, 2016.

== Adoption and parenting ==
In 1977, partly due to the anti-gay Save Our Children campaign led by Anita Bryant in Miami, the Florida Legislature passed a law specifically prohibiting homosexuals from adopting children; the statute survived several court challenges, and was upheld by the Eleventh Circuit Court of Appeals in 2004 in Lofton v. Secretary of the Department of Children and Family Services.

In 2010, in the case of In re: Gill, involving a same-sex couple raising two foster children whom they wanted to adopt, a state appeals court upheld the ruling by a lower court that the law violated equal protection rights of the couple and the children under the Florida Constitution. The Governor and Attorney General declined to appeal the ruling further, ending Florida's 33-year-old ban on same-sex adoptions.

The Florida Legislature undertook comprehensive adoption reform in 2015. The legislation repealed the 1977 ban on homosexual adoption. It passed the Florida House of Representatives on a 68–50 vote on March 11. On April 15, the Florida Senate passed the bill on a 27–11 vote. Republican Governor Rick Scott signed the bill into law on June 11, and it went into effect on July 1, 2015.

Lesbian couples have access to in vitro fertilization. State law recognizes the non-genetic, non-gestational mother as a legal parent to a child born via donor insemination, but only if the parents are married. The Florida Department of Health began automatically recognizing the non-biological mother as a legal parent on May 5, 2016. The move came after three same-sex couples filed a federal lawsuit against the state in July 2015 over its practice of treating married same-sex couples differently to married opposite-sex couples; the non-biological father is automatically recognized as a legal parent, but previously this was not the case for the non-biological mother. Additionally, gay male couples are permitted to undertake gestational and traditional surrogacy arrangements under the same terms and conditions as different-sex couples.

On May 17, 2023, DeSantis signed Florida Senate Bill 254, as passed by the state legislature, which will allow child custody modifications on the basis that the child has received, or might receive, gender-affirming care.

=== Drag performances and minors ===
In December 2022, undercover agents of DeSantis' administration attended a drag performance in Orlando to determine whether the event was violating state obscenity laws, especially if minors were present. The undercover agents found no wrongdoing, and that the venue did not violate state obscenity or decency laws. However, the state filed a complaint against the Orlando Philharmonic Plaza Foundation, the organizer of the event, claiming that these laws were violated anyways.

In May 2023, Governor Ron DeSantis signed a bill to ban "adult live performances" anywhere a minor might view them, under criminal penalty. Though the law does not explicitly name "drag shows" as a target, DeSantis said the law was about "drag shows" when he signed the bill. On June 23, a judge issued a preliminary injunction against the bill, preventing its enforcement during a pending legal challenge, on the basis that not all drag performances are obscene and that current obscenity laws provide enough protection to minors. Though the state appealed the preliminary injunction, the case was denied certiorari by the U.S. Supreme Court on November 16, 2023.. On August 4, 2026, the Eleventh Circuit Court of Appeals, en-banc, upheld the ban and overturned the preliminary injunction.

== Discrimination protections ==
Map of Florida counties and cities that had sexual orientation and/or gender identity anti–employment discrimination ordinances prior to Bostock Sexual orientation and gender identity with anti–employment discrimination ordinance Sexual orientation and gender identity solely in public employment Sexual orientation in public employment Does not protect sexual orientation and gender identity in employment¹ ¹Since 2020 as a result of Bostock, discrimination on account of sexual orientation or gender identity in public and private employment is outlawed throughout the state.

Since 2000, and amended in 2007, nursing homes and hospitals cannot discriminate on the basis of sexual orientation, but gender identity is not addressed. Florida statutes do not address discrimination based on gender identity or sexual orientation in employment, housing or other areas.

The counties of Alachua, Broward, Duval, Hillsborough, Leon, Miami-Dade, Monroe, Orange, Osceola, Palm Beach, Pinellas, and Volusia, and the cities and towns of Atlantic Beach, Boynton Beach, Delray Beach, Dunedin, Fernandina Beach, Fort Lauderdale, Gainesville, Greenacres, Gulfport, Haverhill, Jacksonville, Juno Beach, Key West, Lake Clarke Shores, Lake Park, Lake Worth Beach, Largo, Leesburg, Mascotte, Miami, Miami Beach, Mount Dora, North Palm Beach, North Port, Oakland Park, Ocean Ridge, Orlando, Pembroke Pines, Riviera Beach, Sarasota, St. Petersburg, Tallahassee, Tampa, Tequesta, Venice, Wellington, West Palm Beach, Westlake, and Wilton Manors prohibit discrimination in private and public employment, housing and public accommodations on account of sexual orientation and gender identity. St. Augustine Beach has similar protections, but for employment and housing only.

Sarasota County, Cape Coral, Neptune Beach, and Port St. Lucie prohibit discrimination in employment on the basis of sexual orientation and gender identity in the public sector only, i.e. against county or city employees only. Likewise, Montverde prohibits public sector-discrimination but on the basis of sexual orientation only.

The Florida Competitive Workforce Act would ban LGBT discrimination in employment, housing and public accommodations statewide. First introduced in 2009, it received its first public hearing in 2016. It stalled in a 6–6 vote amid disputes over the inclusion of gender identity protections and restrooms. The bill is bipartisan and supported by a number of business groups.

In January 2019, the Florida Department of Agriculture and Consumer Services added sexual orientation and gender identity to their discrimination workplace policy.

=== Glenn v. Brumby ===
In December 2011, the United States Court of Appeals for the Eleventh Circuit (which covers Alabama, Florida and Georgia) ruled that Vandy Beth Glenn, a transgender woman living in Georgia, had been unfairly terminated from her job at the Georgia Legislative Assembly due to her transgender status. Relying on Price Waterhouse v. Hopkins and other Title VII precedent, the court concluded that the plaintiff was discriminated against based on her sex because she was transitioning from male to female. The court stated that a person is considered transgender "precisely because of the perception that his or her behavior transgresses gender stereotypes." As a result, there is "congruence" between discriminating against transgender individuals and discrimination on the basis of "gender-based behavioral norms." "Because everyone is protected against discrimination based on sex stereotypes, such protections cannot be denied to transgender individuals", the court ruled. The court held that employment discrimination based on transgender status is tantamount to discrimination on the basis of sex, as defined by the Civil Rights Act of 1964.

=== Bostock v. Clayton County ===
On June 15, 2020, the U.S. Supreme Court ruled in Bostock v. Clayton County, consolidated with Altitude Express, Inc. v. Zarda, and R.G. & G.R. Harris Funeral Homes Inc. v. Equal Employment Opportunity Commission that discrimination in the workplace on the basis of sexual orientation or gender identity is discrimination on the basis of sex, and Title VII therefore protects LGBT employees from discrimination.

LGBT advocacy groups in Florida hailed the decision, urging the state to pass legislation extending discrimination protections to housing, credit, health care and public accommodations.

In February 2021, the Florida Commission on Human Relations, the state's civil rights enforcement agency, announced it will enforce the Bostock ruling. The agency announced it will investigate claims of discrimination in employment, housing and public accommodations. The Human Rights Campaign hailed the decision:

Today's action by the Florida Commission on Human Relations is an enormous victory for LGBTQ people across the state who will now be protected under state law against discrimination in employment, housing, and public accommodations. Florida is home to one of the largest LGBTQ populations in the country and the impact of this action will vastly improve the health, safety, prosperity, and lives of hundreds of thousands of LGBTQ Floridians. Today's decision should also serve as a reminder that leaders in every state have the power to take action to improve the lives of LGBTQ people and deliver on the promise of equality for all. Florida joins a list of states controlled by both Republicans and Democrats that have already taken this simple but monumental action. We look forward to other states following suit.

=== Hate crime law ===
Florida's hate crime law provides harsher legal penalties for crimes committed based on the victim(s)' sexual orientation, but not gender identity.

=== Medical practitioner's discrimination law ===
In May 2023, a bill passed both houses of the Florida Legislature to legally allow discrimination within doctors surgery, medicine and hospitals by medical practitioners - on the grounds of conscience, religion or belief. The Governor of Florida signed the bill into law in the same month, effective immediately by an "emergency clause". This was criticized as directly impacting both the Florida LGBTQ community and women - by preventing access to PrEP medication, gender affirming care, and abortion access (as some examples).

=== Anti-DEI policies ===
On April 23, 2026, DeSantis signed HB 1001/SB 1134 into law; effective January 2027, the bill prohibits state and local governments from funding or promoting diversity, equity, and inclusion (DEI) efforts, defined as "manipulat[ing] or otherwise influenc[ing] the composition of employees with reference to race, color, sex, ethnicity, gender identity, or sexual orientation other than to ensure that hiring is conducted in accordance with state and federal anti-discrimination laws." It also allows individuals to sue governments for engaging in DEI, and the Governor to remove elected officials suspected of promoting DEI for malfeasance in office.

The bill has been interpreted by groups such as Equality Florida as a ban on any government support and funding to LGBTQ organizations and events (such as Pride parades). In an act of anticipatory obedience, Palm Beach County denied a federal HUD grant to repair the air conditioning of a city-owned building in Lake Worth Beach by citing the law, as it was being rented by the LGBTQ+ organization Compass as their headquarters.

== Transgender rights ==
=== Identity documents ===
In January 2022, it was reported that for the first time within Florida's history a birth certificate has "sex-unknown" listed for an individual, instead of either just male or female.

In January 2024, the Florida Department of Highway Services and Motor Vehicles unilaterally implemented regulations banning the issuing of any drivers license with a gender marker different from the holder's assigned sex at birth. Those who currently hold/use such licenses, or those who attempt to obtain them, are considered criminally guilty of fraud, with the license in question subject to suspension and revocation.

==== History ====
In July 2024, it was widely reported by the media that transgender individuals born within Florida could not get to “update or make changes” to the sex on their own personal birth certificate - despite explicit Florida legislation for years allowing and permitting it.

Transgender people in Florida were previously allowed to change their legal gender on their birth certificates, but not their driver's licenses and other state IDs. The Bureau of Vital Statistics could issue an amended birth certificate with a corrected gender marker upon receipt of an "Application to Amend a Florida Birth Record", an "Affidavit of Amendment of Certificate of Live Birth" signed in front of a notary, a letter from a physician confirming "appropriate clinical treatment for gender transition", and the payment of the amendment fee. "Appropriate clinical treatment for gender transition" does not include the need to undergo sex reassignment surgery or sterilization. The Department of Highway Services and Motor Vehicles once required evidence of sex reassignment surgery in order to change the gender marker on a Florida ID and driver's license. In 2011, the Department changed its requirements. In order to update a name and/or gender on a Florida ID or driver's license, the applicant must submit a court order for a name change and/or a signed original statement on office letterhead from the attending physician stating that the applicant is undergoing "appropriate clinical treatment for gender transition".

=== Facility Requirements Based on Sex Act ===
Since July 1, 2023, it is illegal for a trans person at any state school, state university, or government building (e.g., at a beach or airport), to use any bathroom or changing facility consistent with their gender identity. Each institution must place gender labels on its bathrooms and establish internal "disciplinary procedures" for its own members (faculty, staff, students, inmates, etc.) who enter the bathroom forbidden to them. An authority figure at the institution who spots someone using the bathroom for the "opposite sex" may ask the person to "depart". If the accused person doesn't depart and doesn't have an official status at the institution, they can be charged with criminal trespass.

On August 23, for Florida's 28 public community and state colleges, the Florida Board of Education approved a disciplinary procedure: employees who enter the bathroom forbidden to them can be fired. (This procedure does not affect Florida's state universities, which are in a different system.)

On October 18, 2023, the Florida Board of Education voted to apply a similar restriction on bathroom use at private college and university buildings, including at any student housing run by those schools. The schools must prove their compliance by April 1, 2024.

==== History ====
In August 2020, the U.S. Eleventh Circuit Court of Appeals ruled that a high school in Ponte Vedra Beach violated the law by refusing to allow transgender student Andrew Adams to use the restroom consistent with his gender identity. In October 2022, the Florida Board of Education unanimously approved restrictions on how transgender people can use school bathrooms, aligned with the Parental Rights in Education Act ("Don't Say Gay"). In January 2023, the United States Court of Appeals for the Eleventh Circuit sided with the Ponte Vedra Beach school district and formally upheld the ban on transgender individuals within bathrooms in Florida. On May 17, 2023, DeSantis signed a bathroom bill into law, as passed by the Florida state legislature earlier that month.

=== Sports ===
On June 1, 2021, Florida Governor Ron DeSantis signed a bill excluding transgender girls and women (which the bill defines as "students of the male sex", based on sex assigned at birth) from participating in sports designated for female students. In April, the bill had been passed by the Florida House of Representatives, then shelved by the Florida Senate before being taken up again with last-minute legislative "procedural maneuvers". Immediately after DeSantis signed the bill, a lawsuit was filed in state and federal courts. Additionally, the Human Rights Campaign kicked off the campaign to try and stop the law from going into effect (called "nullification") on midnight July 1.

In early 2023, the Florida High School Athletics Association recommended that all female athletes be mandated to supply up to date information on their menstrual cycles to a database accessible by their school's administrators. This was speculated by many to be a method of both enforcing abortion restrictions, and detecting any female athletes who might be trans women in violation of the state's ban.

In practice, this has extended far beyond simple athletics, with the Florida Attorney General's office threatening numerous competitions including an Irish step dancing competition and the Miss America pageant for allowing transgender competitors, calling it "deceptive" and saying that it "deprives women of the full and equal enjoyment of fair competition".

=== Healthcare ===
In August 2022, Florida, citing state-issued guidance against gender affirming care ("widely debunked", according to the UK's Independent), began a rule change process to institute bans on social transition and gender-affirming healthcare for trans youth and a requirement for any adult seeking gender-affirming care to receive approval from the Florida Board of Medicine at least 24 hours in advance.

On October 31, 2022, the Florida Medical Board implemented the new rule requiring a 24-hour waiting period for adults before they can undergo sexual reassignment surgery and to ban minors from any gender-affirming healthcare. On November 4, 2022, the new rule was approved by the Florida Board of Medicine. All 14 board members had been appointed to the position by Governor DeSantis, and eight of them had contributed financially to DeSantis' election campaign.

On the same day, the state Board of Osteopathic Medicine approved a similar rule, but theirs contained an exemption to allow gender-affirming care for children enrolled in research studies.

The Board of Medicine rule took effect on March 16, 2023.

On May 17, 2023, DeSantis signed a law to codify these changes. Three plaintiffs — two transgender children and a transgender adult — challenged the law. On June 6, a district court issued a preliminary injunction blocking enforcement of the rule only for these three people during their lawsuit, but a year later, on August 26, 2024, the U.S. Court of Appeals for the 11th Circuit sided with the state of Florida and stayed the injunction.

==== Youth ====
===== State board rules =====
As a result of the Board of Medicine rule, minors (under 18) cannot receive any gender-affirming healthcare in Florida, even to participate in clinical trials. This means they cannot receive puberty blockers, hormone therapy, or gender confirming surgeries (though surgery was already generally not provided to minors), unless they are intersex. Furthermore, a memo stated that social transition "should not be a treatment option for children or adolescents", contradicting the global medical consensus as reflected in the WPATH Standards of Care.

Most major medical organizations, including the U.S Department of Health and Human Services (HHS), and international bodies such as The Endocrine Society, opposed Florida's proposal.

===== Background of state board rules =====
Surgeon General Joseph Ladapo's April 2022 press release stated that the federal government's guidance "was never about health care, it was about injecting political ideology into the health of our children. Children experiencing gender dysphoria should be supported by family and seek counseling, not pushed into an irreversible decision before they reach 18." He cited a study that claimed high rates of desistance among transgender youth but that has been widely criticized by the psychiatric community for using "a large cohort of children who did not actually meet the criteria for gender dysphoria, meaning they were not transgender".

On October 28, 2022, Florida's Board of Medicine passed a motion to ban all gender-affirming healthcare for minors, including puberty blockers, hormones, and surgeries. The motion mandates all transgender youth to detransition until they turn 18. At one point during the hearing, in response to one protester yelling that trans children would be harmed as a result, board member Dr. Zachariah P. Zachariah answered "That's okay", before voting on the issue. Some who had been at the meeting said that the board had put all the speakers in favor of the ban, many of whom were from outside of the state or outside of the country, first in line to speak, before cutting off public comment once they ran out and pro-trans Floridians began speaking at the meeting. Some protesters staged a die-in where the meeting was held.

===== Legislation =====
In April 2023, both houses of the Florida state legislature passed a bill codifying the ban on gender affirming care for minors, and allowing the state to modify or nullify parental custody agreements from other states if the child involved is allowed access to or is “threatened with” being allowed access to gender affirming care. Opponents of the bill said that it would effectively allow kidnapping of trans kids across state lines. During protests against the bill, several trans children were reportedly detained by the legislature and illegally withheld from their parents. All but one were eventually released, with the remaining one being arrested and criminally charged with disturbing the peace. Less than a week later, the Florida House issued subpoenas to the American Psychological Association and American Academy of Pediatrics over their advocacy in favor of gender affirming care. Florida House Speaker Paul Renner stated that the purpose of the subpoenas was to see whether the organizations in question had been captured by "radical gender ideology".

In June 2024, a federal judge permanently blocked the law from taking effect, striking down provisions that banned gender affirming care for minors and adults.

===== Commentary =====
DeSantis and other Republicans have characterized gender-affirming care "as medically unproven and potentially dangerous in the long term, [and] as another political battle against liberal ideologies." Many medical groups, doctors, and mental health specialists have said that treatment for transgender youth is safe and effective, although there is a lack of long-term research on gender-affirming care.

Other scientists cited in Ladapo's April 2022 memo said their studies were willfully misrepresented and that their original data instead showed that "hormone blockers and hormone replacement therapy could help alleviate gender dysphoria and make transgender youth feel more at home in their own bodies".

Ladapo's guidelines were also heavily criticized by organizations such as GLAAD, The Trevor Project, the Human Rights Campaign, and the ACLU. The LGBT media advocacy organization GLAAD argued that the memo was "playing politics with [transgender children's] lives", stating that "All major medical associations support gender-affirming care for trans youth. Denying kids live-saving, medically necessary, gender-affirming care is downright dangerous." The HHS agency's Office for Civil Rights pledged to defend anyone who was denied medical treatment because of gender status, stating: "Parents or caregivers who believe their child has been denied health care, including gender affirming care, on the basis of that child's gender identity, may file a complaint with OCR."

==== Adult ====
In August 2022, the state medical board voted to require any trans adult seeking gender affirming healthcare care to receive their approval at least 24 hours in advance. In May 2023, this rule was codified into law. The law, "Treatments for Sex Reassignment," says that "consent must be voluntary, informed, and in writing on forms adopted in rule by the Board of Medicine and the Board of Osteopathic Medicine."

In January 2023, the DeSantis administration issued an executive memorandum requiring all of Florida's public universities to provide numbers on how many adults they provided with gender affirming medical care, the types of care provided, the names of facilities used, and the number and ages of individuals prescribed various specific treatments.

On May 17, 2023, DeSantis signed a law, "Treatments for Sex Reassignment" (often referred to as SB 254) banning insurance providers from covering gender-affirming care for adults, as well as banning nurse practitioners and physicians' assistants (estimated to make up 80% of gender affirming care providers) from administering it, and banning it from being offered via telehealth. The bill also included a mandatory pause on all gender affirming healthcare for trans adults in the state of Florida, due to a requirement for all adult patients to sign a form which had yet to be drafted by the Florida Board of Medicine. SB 254 was eventually struck down as unconstitutional in June 2024, including its provisions on adult gender-affirming care.

In June 2023, the Florida Board of Medicine drafted legal requirements for trans patients to receive or continue to receive hormone medication. These requirements include having full social support for their transness, submitting to suicide risk assessments every three months, yearly mental health evaluations, and regular general psychiatric sessions in perpetuity, receiving a wide array of expensive medical tests including DEXA scans on a regular basis, and not having any psychiatric comorbidities including anxiety, depression, and ADHD, despite many such comorbidities being direct symptoms of gender dysphoria. These regulations have been criticized as intended to make gender affirming care impossible to access to all but the barest sliver of the transgender population.

==== State Medicaid ====
In June 2022, the Florida Agency for Healthcare Administration (AHCA), the agency responsible for overseeing the state's Medicaid service, released a report declaring transgender hormone therapy "experimental and investigational". The AHCA did not reveal its communications with health experts that led to its report.

The report was criticized by a group of scientists, including four from Yale University, who called the report unscientific, flawed, and politically motivated, finding that the report ignored accepted scientific studies and consensus regarding gender dysphoria, had its writers chosen from those with ties to anti-LGBTQ groups specifically for their bias, cited sources with no scientific merit - including a student blog post and a letter to the editor, and that if the state used the same standard it used in the report to evaluate other treatments, it would no longer allow Medicaid to pay for drugs that lower cholesterol. The response to the report also stated that "medical treatment for gender dysphoria does meet generally accepted professional medical standards and is not experimental or investigational".

Effective from August 21, 2022, state Medicaid regulations ban coverage of sexual reassignment surgery, hormone replacement therapy, puberty blockers and "any other transgender healthcare initiatives" for all individuals, regardless of age. This rule affects an estimated 9,000 transgender Floridians. While the legality of the regulation is being heard in court, the regulation can be enforced. The judge ordered the AHCA to turn over its communications with health experts by February 14, 2023.

On June 21, 2023, the court decided in Dekker v. Weida that Medicaid must continue to cover gender-affirming healthcare. The decision was appealed. On October 13, 2023, legal representatives from 19 states—principally Attorneys General Steve Marshall of Alabama, Tim Griffin of Arkansas, and Jonathan Skrmetti of Tennessee—submitted an amicus brief arguing that the court should reverse its decision and forbid Medicaid coverage of all gender-affirming care, including care for adults. The amicus brief cited the Dobbs decision. On November 22, 2024, the 11th U.S. Circuit Court of Appeals heard arguments appealing the case.

=== Prison ===
Under Florida law, trans people are sent to prisons based on their assigned gender at birth. In men's prisons, trans women frequently have their heads forcibly shaved and - due to “anti-woke” restrictions implemented in 2023 - are forcibly taken off hormone therapy, and instead put through psychiatric conversion therapy.

== Education ==
=== Parental Rights in Education Act ===
On March 28, 2022, Governor of Florida Ron DeSantis signed the Parental Rights in Education Act, often referred to as "Don't Say Gay" by its opponents. The Florida Legislature had passed it earlier that month. The law took effect on July 1, 2022. It applied from kindergarten through grade 3.

On May 17, 2023, DeSantis signed a separate bill that expanded the restrictions to older students.

==== Restrictions ====
The original law prohibits classroom instruction on sexual orientation or gender identity from kindergarten to grade 3 in Florida public school districts, or instruction on sexual orientation or gender identity in a manner that is not "age appropriate or developmentally appropriate for students" in any grade. Legal scholars disagreed over whether the law prohibits classroom discussion of these topics, since "classroom discussion" is mentioned in the preamble of the law. The law also allows parents and teachers to sue any school district if they believe this policy is violated, with school districts covering the cost of the lawsuit. The law additionally prevents school districts from withholding information about a child's "mental, emotional, or physical well-being" from their parents unless educators believe there is a risk of "abuse, abandonment, or neglect." It additionally requires schools to create a procedure for parents to opt-out of counseling and physical health services for their children offered by the school. Schools must also seek the permission of parents before administering mental health screeners to children from kindergarten to 3rd grade.

Even though the bill does not mention the word "gay" explicitly, it specifically bans classroom discussion about sexual orientation and gender identity, leading scholars to debate whether saying the word "gay" in schools would be prohibited in practice under the law in most cases.

==== Reactions ====
A University of Florida poll showed voters are divided – 49% strongly or somewhat disapproved of the legislation and 40 percent strongly or somewhat approved. In contrast, a Public Opinion Strategies poll found that 61 percent support the legislation while 26 percent oppose it; 70 percent of parents support the legislation while 24 percent oppose it; and 51 percent of Democrats support the legislation while 29 percent oppose it. Supporters of the bill state that discussions about sexuality and gender identity should be handled by a child's parents and not by their schools; DeSantis' Press Secretary Christina Pushaw has called HB 1557 an "Anti-Grooming Bill". Opponents of the bill state that it could further stigmatize LGBTQ students and that schools should be a place where LGBTQ topics are discussed. Some conservatives, such as political commentator Matt Walsh, argue that the bill does not go far enough. There are concerns among some legal scholars that the proposed legislation within Florida could violate the First Amendment to the United States Constitution, and could be potentially unconstitutional. Walkouts by students were held in schools across Florida in response to the bill. The bill has the potential to negatively affect the $97 billion tourism industries within Florida.

Employees at The Walt Disney Company also planned walkouts over the bill, which culminated in a large protest. After DeSantis signed the bill, Disney released a statement that its goal is for the law to be repealed or struck down. Disney also paused their contributions to Florida political campaigns as they assessed their "approach to advocacy, including political giving in Florida." Prompted by DeSantis, the Florida Legislature passed a bill in April that could limit Disney's ability to self-govern and impose tax penalties; the move was considered by many to be retaliation to Disney's actions following HB 1557's passage.

On March 31, a lawsuit was filed in federal court on behalf of Equality Florida and Family Equality, which sought to block the bill on the grounds that it was unconstitutional. The lawsuit alleged that the bill violates the constitutionally protected rights of free speech, equal protection and due process of students and families, and argued that the bill was an effort to "control young minds" which prevented students from living "their true identities in school". In October 2022, a federal judge dismissed and rejected the challenge to the legislation effective since July 1.

The Human Rights Campaign and the Center for Countering Digital Hate recorded a 406% increase in the use of tweets associating the LGBTQ community with being "groomers", "pedophiles", and "predators" following the passage of the law.

=== AP African American studies ===
On January 12, 2023, the Florida Department of Education's Office of Articulation, under the administration of Republican governor Ron DeSantis, sent a letter to College Board saying the course was "inexplicably contrary to Florida law and significantly lacks educational value." The letter reportedly did not specify what was objectionable to the department, but a spokesperson for DeSantis indicated that the course left "large, ambiguous gaps that can be filled with additional ideological material." According to The New York Times, the letter called the course "historically inaccurate" and a violation of Florida state law.

DeSantis later gave his reason for the ban as the inclusion of queer theory and intersectionality in the course, as well as content regarding the role prisons play in systemic oppression, stating that these topics were on "the wrong side of the line for Florida standards". In response, College Board said that it would revise the course nationwide, but did not give specifics on how. The decision was praised by the Florida DoE, who called for College Board to remove "content on Critical Race Theory, Black Queer Studies, Intersectionality and other topics that violate our laws".

The updated version of the course was later released, with the names of numerous black writers associated with black feminism, critical race theory, and the queer experience being stripped from the course, the Black Lives Matter movement removed from the formal curriculum, and "black conservatism" added as a suggested research topic.

=== Book bans ===
In March 2022, Florida passed a law to create a list of sanctioned reading material for students in educational settings, punishing any teacher or school librarian whose classrooms or libraries contain unsanctioned books with felony charges. Sanctioned books must be reviewed by the state to be free of "prohibited material harmful to minors", which critics have said that under Florida state law includes content regarding the LGBTQ community and black history.

On May 17, 2023, Governor Ron DeSantis signed an expansion law that came into force in July 1st of that year. The expansion increased the scope of the Florida Department of Education's purview to ban books and added scope to affect classroom books as well as library collections. Additionally, parental rights and privileges to revoke books through "book objections" were finalized, and the use of pronouns not aligned with assigned sex at birth prohibited for school employees and contractors. In 2025, U.S. District Court Judge Carlos Mendoza struck down key parts of the expansion bill after a group of large publishers sued Florida on 1st amendment grounds. This ruling will be appealed to the 11th circuit; in February 2026 the amicus brief for the appeal was filed.

On September 23, 2026, the Florida Education Commissioner put out a memo directing school districts within the state to do a review of their book collections against a collated ban list from all schools in the state. The memo adds heightened scrutiny to books that were never flagged by parents or the local community as objectionable but found to be so elsewhere. As of 2026, there are over 500 titles that have been removed or discontinued by one or more school boards.

== Gay and trans panic defense ==
The gay and trans panic defense remains legal in Florida. In March 2021, a bill to repeal it passed the Criminal Justice committee in the Senate by a vote of 6–2. The bill died in the Judiciary committee. The gay panic defense is a legal strategy in which defendants accused of violent offenses claim that unwanted same-sex sexual advances provoked them into reacting by way of self-defense.

== Conversion therapy ==
On September 3, 2015, State Representative David Richardson filed a bill to ban the use of conversion therapy on LGBTQ minors. The bill was introduced to the Florida Legislature on January 12, 2016. However, it died in a House subcommittee on March 11, 2016. A similar bill died in 2017. Since July 2016, the Florida Department of Children and Families has prohibited facility staff from attempting to change or discourage a child's sexual orientation, gender identity or gender expression. According to an Orlando Political Observer-Gravis Marketing poll conducted in April 2017, 71% of Floridians supported banning conversion therapy for minors, 11% were against banning it and 18% were uncertain.

=== Local bans ===
As of February 2020, several cities and counties in Florida have passed their own bans on conversion therapy on minors, namely Brevard County, Miami Beach, Wilton Manors, Miami, North Bay Village, West Palm Beach, Bay Harbor Islands, Lake Worth, El Portal, Key West, Boynton Beach, Tampa, Delray Beach, Riviera Beach, Wellington, Greenacres, Boca Raton, Oakland Park, Palm Beach County, Gainesville, Broward County, Alachua County, Fort Lauderdale, and Tallahassee. Conversion therapy bans have also been proposed or pending in other cities, for example in Sarasota, and St. Petersburg.

On January 31, 2019, a federal judge granted a temporary injunction against part of the Tampa ordinance. The judge stopped the city from enforcing its ban on talk therapy, while a lawsuit, Vazzo v. City of Tampa, was allowed to proceed. Other forms of therapy, such as electroshock therapy, are still explicitly banned. The city filed a motion to dismiss. In November 2020, the 11th Circuit Court of Appeals voted 2–1 to declare ordinances banning conversion therapy on minors in Boca Raton and surrounding Palm Beach County a violation of the First Amendment of the Constitution. The American Academy of Pediatrics and the American Psychiatric Association are fully opposed to this pseudoscientific practice. This decision caused a circuit split; the Third Circuit and Ninth Circuit courts of appeals have upheld conversion therapy bans as constitutional.

== LGBTQ sanctuary city ==
In September 2023, Lake Worth Beach, Florida became a "LGBTQ sanctuary city" to protect and defend LGBTQ rights.

== Living conditions ==
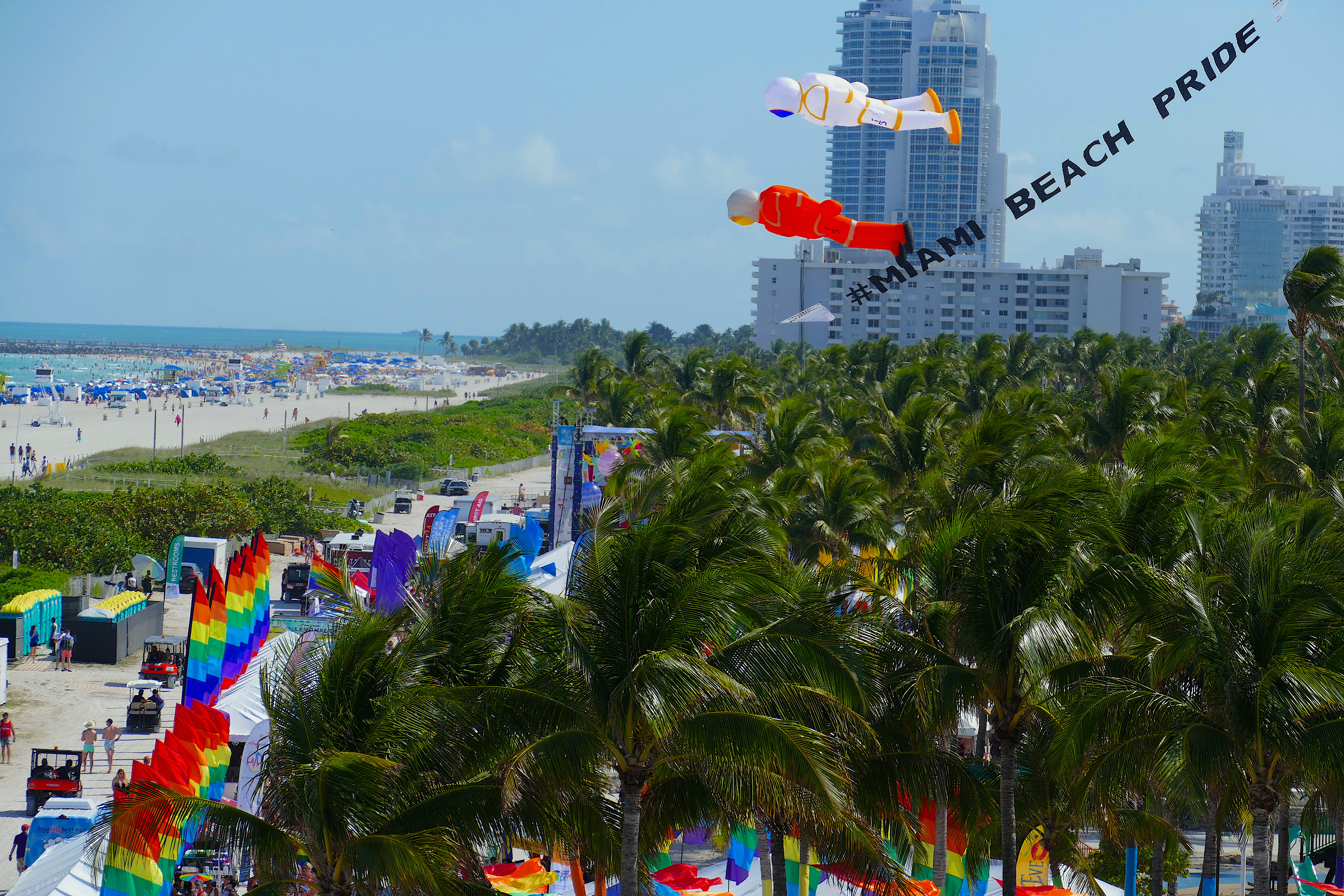
LGBTQ Pride festival in Miami Beach, 2019

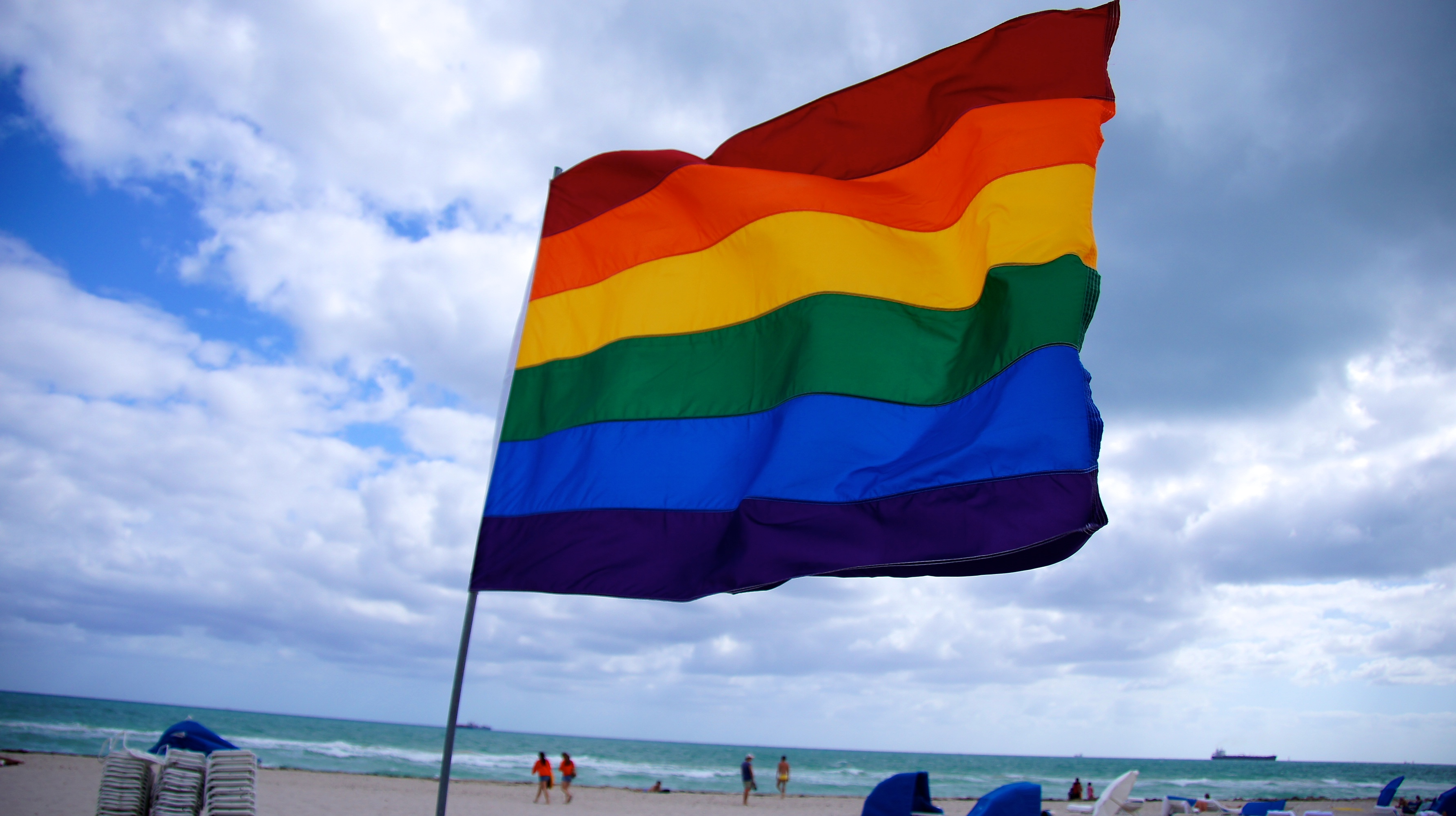
LGBTQ rainbow flag at South Beach, Miami in 2011

Faced initially with high homophobia, LGBTQ groups began slowly to raise awareness of their cause and movement. Several organizations and associations were established over the years, including SAVE Dade in 1993, The Pride Center at Equality Park in 1993 and Equality Florida in 1997, among others.

The Miami metropolitan area is famous internationally for its LGBTQ culture, scene and nightlife, with numerous bars, clubs, cafés and events catering to the LGBTQ community, leading Miami to be called a "gay mecca". The cities of Miami Beach (especially the neighborhood of South Beach) and Wilton Manors particularly are often referred to as gay villages. As is Key West, which elected one of the first openly gay mayors in the country; Richard A. Heyman served as mayor from 1983 to 1985 and again from 1987 to 1989. There is also a fairly large LGBTQ community in Fort Lauderdale. LGBTQ events include Miami Beach Pride, which drew an estimated 150,000 participants and spectators in 2019, PrideFest Key West, the OutShine Film Festival, Pride Fort Lauderdale and Palm Beach Pride, held annually in late March in Lake Worth, among others. Outside of Southern Florida, events include Come Out with Pride in Orlando, St. Pete Pride in St. Petersburg, the Tampa International Gay and Lesbian Film Festival, River City Pride in Jacksonville, Gay Days at Walt Disney World, Memorial Day Pensacola Beach Pride, and Tallahassee Pridefest.

On June 12, 2016, a shooting occurred at an Orlando gay nightclub, Pulse, the deadliest incident in the history of violence against LGBTQ people in the United States. However, media reported that the shooting resulted in no legislative advances in LGBTQ rights, with the Republican Party continuing to oppose legislation which would protect LGBTQ people from discrimination. In June 2021, Governor Ron DeSantis vetoed an "item-lined budget bill" - that legally provides mental health, counseling and compensation, directly towards victims of the June 2016 Pulse nightclub Orlando shootings within Florida. That month, the US Congress passed, and Biden signed, a law creating a national memorial at the site of the shooting.

== Public opinion ==
A 2017 Public Religion Research Institute (PRRI) poll found that 61 percent of Florida residents supported same-sex marriage, while 30 percent were opposed; nine percent were undecided. Additionally, 71 percent supported an anti-discrimination law covering sexual orientation and gender identity; twenty-two percent were against. The PRRI also found that 62 percent were against allowing public businesses to refuse to serve LGBTQ people due to religious beliefs, while 31 percent supported such religiously based refusals.

Public opinion for LGBTQ anti-discrimination laws in Florida
Poll source	Date(s) administered	Sample size	Margin of error	% support	% opposition	% no opinion
Public Religion Research Institute	January 2-December 30, 2019	3,866	not stated	72%	21%	7%
Public Religion Research Institute	January 3-December 30, 2018	3,455	not stated	68%	25%	7%
Public Religion Research Institute	April 5-December 23, 2017	4,374	not stated	71%	22%	7%
Public Religion Research Institute	April 29, 2015-January 7, 2016	4,917	not stated	70%	24%	6%

== Summary table ==
Same-sex sexual activity legal	Yes (Since 2003; codified in 2026)
Equal age of consent	Yes (Since 2003)
Anti-discrimination laws for sexual orientation and gender expression in employment, housing, and public accommodations	Yes (Following Bostock v. Clayton County and subsequent decision of the Florida Commission on Human Relations) (Note: Several municipalities, including the state capital Tallahassee, as well as Miami, Jacksonville, Orlando, Tampa, etc., have also passed ordinances protecting LGBTQ people from unfair discrimination in employment, housing and public accommodations.)
Anti-discrimination laws in services and goods	No
Hate crime law covers sexual orientation	Yes
Hate crime law covers gender identity	No
Transgender, intersex and non-binary people allowed to use the bathroom of their gender or sex	No
LGBT subjects free from censorship in education	No (Since 2022)
Same-sex civil unions	No
Same-sex marriages	Yes (Since 2015)
Stepchild and joint adoption by same-sex couples	Yes (Since 2010)
Lesbian, gay and bisexual people allowed to serve openly within the US military	Yes (Since 2011)
Transgender people allowed to serve openly within the US military	No (Since 2025)
Gender non-conforming people allowed to serve openly in the military	No (Cross-dressing banned in the military since 2012)
Intersex people allowed to serve openly in the military	No (Current DoD policy bans "hermaphrodites" from serving or enlisting in the military)
Right to change legal sex/gender - such as on a birth certificate or driving licence	No (Since July 2024)
Gender self-identification	No
Legal recognition of non-binary gender	No
Third-gender option on legal documents	No
Gay panic defense abolished	No
Gay and lesbian criminal records expunged	No
Transgender athletes allowed to participate in the sport of their gender identity	No (Since 2021)
Conversion therapy banned on minors	No (Bans in several cities currently unenforceable)
Access to IVF for lesbian couples	Yes
Surrogacy arrangements legal for gay male couples	Yes
Homosexuality declassified as a mental illness	Yes (since 1973)
Transgender identity declassified as a mental illness	Yes (since 1994) Not considered a mental illness. (Note: Diagnosis of "gender dysphoria" in accordance with DSM-5 (2013), is made only if there is "clinically significant distress or impairment in social, occupational, or other important areas of functioning", the American Psychiatric Association advises. The DSM-IV (1994) listed "gender identity disorder" with similar clinical criteria. Between 1980 and 1994, "transsexualism" was listed as a mental disorder by the DSM-III, without any criteria of "distress" or "impaired function" (in effect, classifying "transgender identity" itself as a mental disorder).)
Intersex sex characteristics declassified as a physical deformity	No
MSMs allowed to donate blood	Yes (Since 2023, on the condition of “being monogamous” under FDA rules)

== See also ==
- Law of Florida
- LGBTQ culture in Miami
- LGBTQ history in Florida
- LGBTQ rights in the United States
- Politics of Florida
- SAVE Dade
- Florida Legislative Investigation Committee, also called the Johns Committee, which tried to eliminate homosexuals from universities and state employment in Florida, 1956–1965
- Homosexuality and Citizenship in Florida, anti-gay pamphlet published by the Johns Committee in 1964, notorious at the time because of its lewd photographs of men engaged in sexual activity
- Palm Beach County Human Rights Council
