= LGBTQ history in Florida =

This article concerns LGBTQ history in Florida.

== 1800–1970 ==
After Florida became a territory of the United States in 1821, the Territorial Legislature enacted laws against fornication, adultery, bigamy, and incest, as well as against "open lewdness, or...any notorious act of public indecency, tending to debauch the morals of society."

Florida's first specific sodomy law, which was enacted in 1845 and made sodomy a felony, it reads: "Whoever commits the abominable and detestable crime against nature, either with mankind or with beast, shall be punished by imprisonment in the state prison not exceeding twenty years." In 1917, the Florida Legislature added a lesser crime, a second-degree misdemeanor: "Whoever commits any unnatural and lascivious act with another person shall be punished by fine not exceeding five hundred dollars, or by imprisonment not exceeding six months." Homosexuality was not addressed specifically in the 1917 law.

== 1900–1960 ==
The general attitude about homosexuality in Miami mirrored many other cities' across the country. Though gay nightlife in the city had enjoyed the same boisterous existence as other forms of entertainment in the 1930s, by the 1950s, the city government worked to shut down as many gay bars as possible and enacted laws making homosexuality and cross-dressing illegal. From 1956 to 1966, the Johns Committee of the Florida Legislature actively sought to root out homosexuals in state employment and in public universities across the state, publishing the inflammatory "Purple Pamphlet", which portrayed all homosexuals as predators and a dire threat to the children of Florida.

== 1960–2000 ==
In the 1960s The Miami Herald ran several stories implying the life of area homosexuals as synonymous with pimps and child molesters, and WTVJ, a television station, aired a documentary titled "The Homosexual" in 1966 warning viewers that young boys were in danger from predatory men. In the 1960s, gay couple Ray and Henry Hillyer began organizing LGBTQ-inclusive beach parties in Pensacola with some of their friends every Fourth of July weekend. The parties continued to grow through the 1970s, attracting several thousand partygoers. In the 1980s and 1990s, as tens of thousands of LGBTQ people and allies attended each year, the event began to attract protests from conservative residents and church groups.

Florida courts interpreted the 1845 law to prohibit all sexual activity between 2 men or 2 women. In 1971, the Florida Supreme Court struck down the "crime against nature" statute as unconstitutionally vague. The court retained the state's prohibition on sodomy by ruling that anal and oral sex could still be prosecuted under the lesser charge of "lewd and lascivious" conduct. The public image of homosexuals changed with liberalized social attitudes of the late 1960s. In 1969, the Stonewall riots occurred in New York City, marking the start of the gay rights movement. Though gay life in Miami was intensely closeted, and bars were subject to frequent raids, Christ Metropolitan Community Church—a congregation for gay and lesbian Christians in Miami—was founded in 1970 as a religious outlet, attracting hundreds of parishioners. Also in 1970, Florida State University students in Tallahassee, led by Hiram Ruiz, founded the first Gay Liberation Front in the southern United States.

The 1972 Democratic National Convention was held in Miami, featuring, for the first time, a public speech about the rights of gay men and lesbians by openly gay San Francisco political activist Jim Foster. Jack Campbell opened the Miami branch of Club Baths in 1974. When it was raided, he made sure that all charges against those arrested were dropped, filed a lawsuit against the Miami Police Department prohibiting further harassment, and received a formal apology from the police. Even the depiction of gay men and lesbians in the local newspaper had changed to that of a silent, oppressed minority. By 1977, Miami was one of nearly 40 cities in the U.S. that had passed ordinances outlawing discrimination against gay men and lesbians. In 1977, partly due to the anti-gay Save Our Children campaign led by Anita Bryant in Miami, the Florida Legislature passed a law specifically prohibiting homosexuals from adopting children.

In 1978, in an effort to stop the anti-gay work happening in Florida, the Florida Task force was created. It was the lesbian and gay civil rights lobby in Tallahassee, and likely the first statewide LGBTQ organization with a paid lobbyist. Patrick Land was the first executive director/lobbyist. Dr. Ronni Sanlo was the second, serving from 1981 to 1983. One of the primary pieces of work during that time was to fight the Bush-Trask amendment, an addendum to the Florida appropriations bill that would have eliminated all state funding to Florida's colleges and universities that supported LGBTQ student organizations. The bill was signed into law but was found unconstitutional by the Florida Supreme Court. In 1997, Equality Florida was established, becoming the largest statewide LGBTQ rights lobby organization.

== 21st century ==
Same-sex sexual activity remained illegal in Florida until 2003, when the United States Supreme Court struck down all state sodomy laws with Lawrence v. Texas. As of mid-2011, the state's sodomy law, though unenforceable, had not been repealed by Florida legislators. Since the passage of the Florida Amendment 2 on November 4, 2008, by a vote of 61.9% in favor and 38.1% opposed, both same-sex marriage and civil union had been banned by Florida's state constitution. Despite that temporary setback, a major victory for LGBTQ rights on November 25, 2008, when Judge Cindy S. Lederman declared the ban on homosexuals adopting children violated the equal protection rights under the Florida Constitution. Florida Third District Court of Appeal ruled in In re: Gill favor of the ruling on September 22, 2010, thus legalizing same-sex adoption in Florida after 33-year ban. In 2009, Miami Beach held its first gay pride parade ever and in 2020 the Greater Fort Lauderdale will be host to the first-ever Pride of the Americas Festival Same-sex marriage in Florida became legal on January 6, 2015, as result of Brenner v. Scott.

== Notable LGBTQ Floridians ==
- Addison Mizner, from Palm Beach, the best-known architect in the country in the 1920s.
- Troy Perry, Christian minister, founder of the LGBTQ Metropolitan Community Church
- Anthony Niedwiecki, former of vice-mayor of Oakland Park (2010)
- Mark Foley, former Congressman from Florida's 16th congressional district (1995–2006), resigned and came out after revelation that he text-messaged underage congressional pages
- Michael Gongora, politician, serves on the Miami Beach City Commission.
- Rodrigo Lehtinen, transgender rights activist
- Ronni Sanlo, University of Florida and North Florida graduate, UCLA professor, LGBTQ Historian, found of Lavender Graduation
- Susan Stanton, transgender politician, former city manager of Largo, Florida (1990–2007), until her announced gender change and subsequent firing by city council, former city manager of Lake Worth, Florida (2009–2011)
- Jim Stork, politician and businessman
- Thomas Bistritz, journalist and author
- Charles Perez, journalist
- Wayne Besen, University of Florida graduate, leader of Truth Wins Out
- Victoria Sigler, first openly LGBTQ circuit court judge in Florida
- Brian Nolan, actor
- Ethel Cain, musician
- Richard Thomas Nolan, Christian minister and teacher
- Alan G. Rogers, U.S. Army soldier, first known openly gay casualty of Operation Iraqi Freedom, ordained pastor of Ebenezer Missionary Baptist Church in Gainesville
- Rand Hoch, first openly LGBTQ judge in Florida; President and Founder. Palm Beach County Human Rights Council
- Robert Lee, first openly LGBTQ county court judge in Florida
- Nadine Smith, journalist turned organizer, was one of four national co-chairs of the 1993 March on Washington. She was part of the historic meeting between then - President Clinton - the first Oval Office meeting between a sitting president and gay community leaders. She served on the founding board of the International Gay and Lesbian Youth Organization. She is currently the executive director of Equality Florida, the largest statewide LGBTQ Civil Rights organization working for full equality for the LGBTQ community.

== See also ==
- LGBTQ culture in Miami
- LGBTQ rights in Florida
