= St. Petersburg Human Rights Ordinance =

The St. Petersburg Human Rights Ordinance is a law that was passed in January 2002 in St. Petersburg, Florida. This law added sexual orientation as a protected status in housing, employment, and public accommodations. This movement was led by Equality Florida's leader Nadine Smith. The law took years to pass due to overruling in city meetings. Equality Florida is an advocacy group that advocates for equal LGBTQ rights for all Florida residents. This organization played a heavy role in passing the first St. Petersburg Human rights ordinance.

For the years leading up to this event, the offices of St. Petersburg were consistently receiving mail from communities in an effort to address the city's failure to protect the LGBTQ community from discrimination. The bill to pass sexual orientation as an addition to the human rights ordinance was previously denied in a county commissioners meeting in 2001. This means that discrimination against age, race, and gender was still prohibited in the workplace, real estate and in public, but sexual orientation was excluded from this law. While supporters argued that this ordinance offered further protection in addition to civil rights laws, opponents of this ordinance argued that the city should not have to further protect those with "alternate lifestyles". It was not until January 2002 that the human rights ordinance law was passed which protected discrimination against rage, gender, age, and sexual orientation in St. Petersburg. This later led to the passing of Pinellas County's own human rights ordinance that protected against the same discriminations in 2008.
