= Hiram Ruiz =

Hiram Ruiz (born November 1949) is a Cuban-American social worker who advocated for LGBTQ+ rights at Florida State University. He is the co-founder of the first Gay Liberation Front in the Southern U.S. and has worked in immigrant and refugee rights at federal, state and international levels.

== Early life and education ==
Ruiz was born in Cuba in 1949 and raised in Miami. He attended Miami Dade College before arriving at Florida State University in Tallahassee, where he graduated with a master's degree in social work in 1975.

=== LGBTQ+ rights in mid-1900s Florida ===
Ruiz grew up mostly closeted in a state which at the time posed heavy restrictions on expressions of sexuality and gender identity. He was raised during the height of the Johns Committee, which the Florida Legislature established during the era of the Second Red Scare and Lavender Scare. The effort was originally aimed at targeting communism, but it was later used against LGBTQ+ people, especially in the state's universities. It wouldn't be until the 1970s that Tallahassee began to be viewed as a hotspot for LGBTQ+ people.

Ruiz moved to Tallahassee in September 1969, just a few months after the Stonewall Riots. Ruiz knew he was gay at age 12, but he lacked the exposure to understand what it meant. Shortly after his move, he went to a party in Chattahoochee, a small town an hour northwest of Tallahassee. It was there that he saw same-sex couples dancing together for the first time. He went to his first gay bar during a February 1970 trip with his friends to Mardi Gras in New Orleans, and he described the experience as "liberating."

=== College activism ===
Ruiz discovered the Gay Liberation Front when he visited his grandfather in Los Angeles during spring break in 1970 and attended a meeting. After returning to Tallahassee, he pitched the idea of starting a chapter at FSU, which would be the first in the South.

FSU's student senate recognized GLF on 5 May 1970, but the chapter continued to face roadblocks, including a restriction from meeting in campus buildings.

A week later, the group paid to run an advertisement in FSU's student newspaper, the FSView & Florida Flambeau. University employees and local businesses wrote to the newspaper to protest its allowance of the advertisement because same-sex sexual activity was still a felony in Florida. It would remain illegal in the state until 2003, when the United States Supreme Court struck down sodomy laws in Lawrence v. Texas. FSU also threatened to discontinue the Flambeau. When the Flambeau turned down GLF's second advertisement, student body president Chuck Sherman called for the newspaper to run it. However, the Flambeau defended its position, and it didn't print future ads from the organization.

With the group still not allowed to hold events on campus, Ruiz hosted its first meeting in his off-campus apartment, which he shared with three gay friends. More than 30 professors and students attended. Ruiz and his roommates were evicted shortly afterward.

Ruiz spent the next summer in New York City, where he took part in demonstrations with the local GLF chapter. He brought the experience back with him to Tallahassee, where he and the FSU chapter began larger scale demonstrations on campus. Echoing the nonviolent sit-ins of the civil rights movement, Ruiz and the club hosted "gay-ins." Other acts of protest involved throwing flowers at construction workers or decorating bake sale tables with upscale finery.

While the GLF did not remain a longterm campus fixture, the People's Coalition for Gay Rights formed soon after, which FSU approved in 1974.

== Career ==
=== International ===
While still working on his master's at FSU, Ruiz was offered a job as a student counselor at the university's London center. After being offered a work permit and fulltime offer, Ruiz spent eight years as a social worker for immigrant neighborhoods, a hospital and Vietnamese refugee centers across England and Scotland.

Ruiz went on to work for three works with refugees in Somalia and Sudan as part of the United Nations High Commission for Refugees.

=== National ===
When Ruiz returned to the U.S., he worked in Washington D.C. in the Government of the District of Columbia's refugee program. He later became a senior policy analyst with the U.S. Committee for Refugees, a position he filled for 16 years, and its director of communications.

=== State ===
Ruiz returned to Miami in 2004, when he became the political director of a local branch of the Service Employees International Union.

In 2008, Ruiz was appointed to the Florida Department of Children and Families as its director of refugee services. He worked in the position until his retirement in March 2015.
