= Equality Florida =

American LGBTQ advocacy organization

- Type: 501(c)(3) and 501(c)(4)
- Purpose: LGBTQ Equality
- Location: Tampa, Florida, US
- Region served: Florida
- Key people: Nadine Smith, CEO
- Revenue: $8.5 million (2023)
- Expenses: $7.5 million (2023)
- Employees: 111
- Volunteers: 3,000-6,000
- Website: eqfl.org

Equality Florida is a political advocacy group that advocates for civil rights and protections for lesbian, gay, bisexual, transgender, and queer (LGBTQ) residents of Florida. In addition to operating two non-profit organizations, Equality Florida also formed the Equality Florida PAC, a state political action committee financing the election of LGBTQ individuals and advocates.

In addition to their involvement in state politics and legislature, Equality Florida has provided local partners with resources to promote state laws protecting LGBTQ rights in Florida. These resources have included leadership training, volunteer opportunities, and sponsorship opportunities.

== Organization ==
Equality Florida Institute Inc is a 501(c)(3) nonprofit organization which has been tax exempt since July 1997. As of 2023, the organization employed 76 staff and had 3,000 volunteers, earning $7.08 million in revenue and spending $6.06 million in expenses, including $621,456 in executive compensation.

Equality Florida Action Inc is a 501(c)(4) nonprofit organization which has been tax exempt since December 2014. As of 2023, the organization employed 35 staff and had 3,000 volunteers, earning $1.42 million in revenue and spending $1.44 million in expenses, including $109,668 in executive compensation.

Both organizations are based in St. Petersburg, Florida.

== History ==
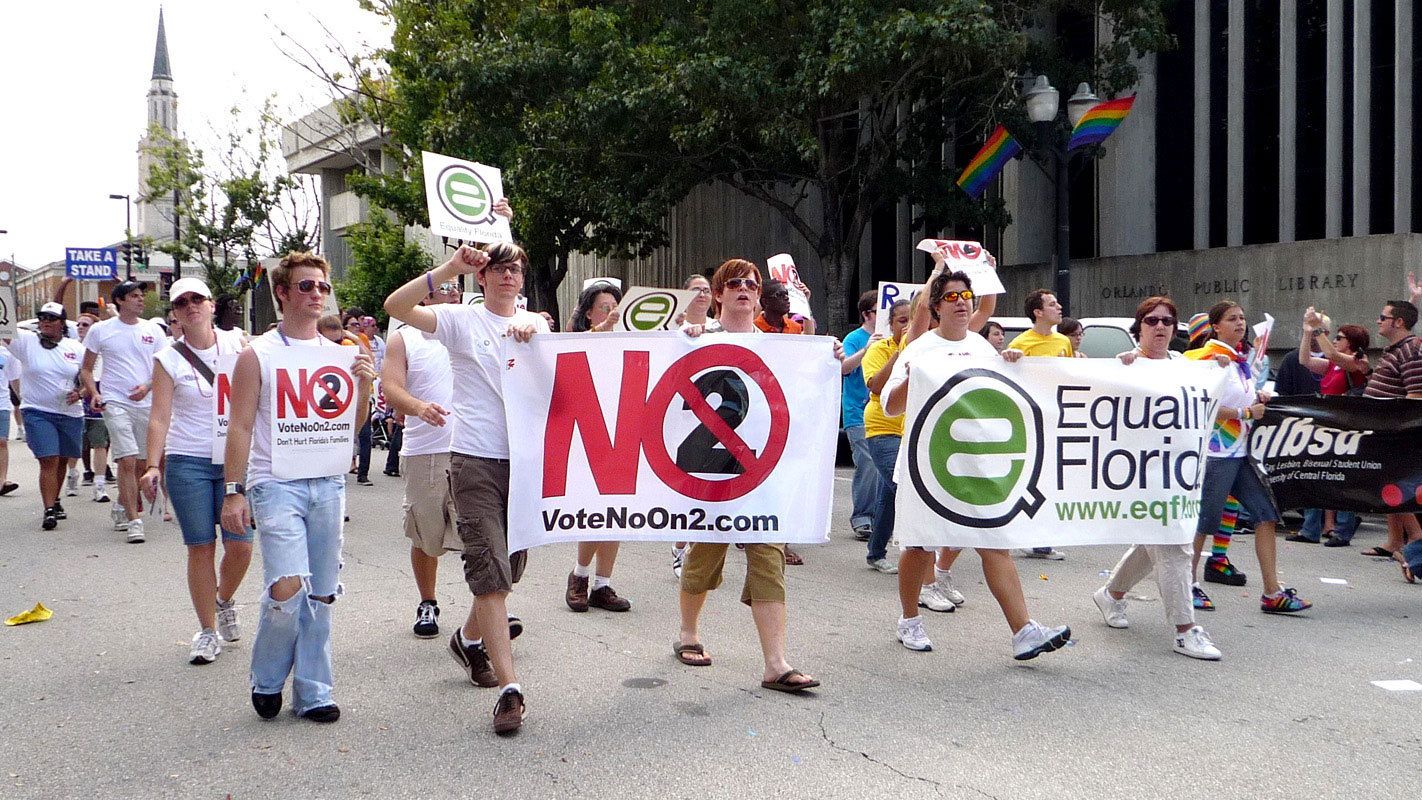
Equality Florida activists marching in Orlando's 2008 pride parade, with some holding signs opposing the 2008 Florida Amendment 2. This amendment was later stayed in 2015.

Nadine Smith, a former journalist at WUSF and The Tampa Tribune, and Stratton Pollitzer formed Equality Florida in 1997. Smith had also previously served as a co-chair of the 1993 March on Washington, and headed a movement that led to passage of the St. Petersburg Human Rights Ordinance in January 2002. Equality Florida, Inc., was later founded in 1999, and followed by Equality Florida Action, Inc., formed in 2014.

The group has since halted numerous anti-LGBTQ bills, such as Florida's since-revoked bans on adoption by same-sex couples, and same-sex marriage.

In 2014, Equality Florida, along with the National Center for Lesbian Rights, filed a joint lawsuit challenging Florida's 2008 ban on same-sex marriage. On January 5, 2015, a Miami-Dade Circuit Judge stayed the existing ban, allowing same-sex marriages in Miami-Dade County. Later, in March 2015, the group was also involved in overturning Florida's 1977 prohibition on adoption by gay and lesbian individuals.

In 2023, Human Rights Campaign and Equality Florida issued a joint travel advisory in response to enactment of six Florida legislature bills, detailing perceived risks to the community.

In 2025, Equality Florida was awarded the Champion for Children Award by the National Association of School Psychologists for the organization's programs, which supported LGBTQ+ youth by partnering with schools, families and care providers.

== See also ==
- Cyberstalking legislation
- Florida Amendment 2
- LGBT history in Florida
- LGBT rights in Florida
- Recognition of same-sex unions in Florida
