= In re Gill =

2010 Florida court case ending homosexual adoption bans

In re: Gill
- Court: Florida Third District Court of Appeal
- Decided: September 22, 2010, in favor of Gill and his partner, who sought to adopt two foster children they had parented since 2004 at the state's behest, thus striking down Florida's anti-gay adoption law.
- Citation: 45 So.3d 79

Case history
- Prior actions: Eleventh Circuit Court found in favor of petitioner, 2008; ruling had been appealed by the State of Florida.
- Subsequent actions: On October 22, 2010, Florida Attorney General Bill McCollum announced he would not pursue the case further, bringing the issue to a close.

Court membership
- Judges sitting: Gerald B. Cope, Jr., two others

Keywords
- adoption, LGBT rights

In re: Gill is a landmark Florida court case that in 2010 ended Florida's 33-year ban on adoptions by homosexuals. In 2007, Frank Martin Gill, an openly gay man, had petitioned the circuit court to adopt two boys that he and his partner had been raising as foster children since 2004. Gill was prohibited from adopting by a 1977 Florida law prohibiting adoption by gay men and lesbians in that state. After a four-day trial challenging the law, on November 25, 2008, Judge Cindy S. Lederman declared the ban violated the equal protection rights of the children and their prospective parents under the Florida Constitution, and granted Gill's adoption request.

The state of Florida appealed the trial court decision. Oral arguments were heard by a three judge panel of the Florida Third District Court of Appeal on August 26, 2009. The district court upheld the trial court's ruling in favor of the plaintiffs on September 22, 2010, and the state declined to pursue any further appeals, thus effectively nullifying the anti-gay adoption statute. The Florida Legislature undertook comprehensive adoption reform in 2015, repealing the 1977 ban on homosexual adoption, which the state had not enforced since 2010.

== Background ==
=== Florida adoption cases ===
In 1977, at the peak of the anti-gay Save Our Children campaign led by Anita Bryant to repeal a Miami-Dade human rights law, the Florida Legislature enacted a law prohibiting adoptions by homosexuals.

Several attempts were made in the state legislature to repeal the adoption ban, and there were several unsuccessful challenges in Florida courts, including:

- Seebol v. Farie (1991)
- Cox. v. Florida Department of Health and Rehabilitative Services (1995)
- Amer v. Johnson (1997)

In 1999, the issue was heard in federal court for the first time when the case of Lofton v. Kearney was taken to the United States District Court in South Florida, which upheld the state law in August 2001. The case was appealed to the U. S. Court of Appeals, Eleventh Circuit. In May 2002, while the Lofton case was pending, eight former state legislators who voted for the 1977 ban, including the former Senate President and House Speaker, repudiated the law. Former representative Elaine Bloom said, "The hysteria of the times led us to do the wrong thing."

Furthermore, in June 2003 the U. S. Supreme Court in Lawrence v. Texas struck down all remaining sodomy laws nationwide as being unconstitutional violations of the due process rights of gays and lesbians. However, in January 2004, the appeals court ruled against Lofton, finding that the adoption ban did not violate constitutional guarantees of equal protection and due process. In May 2005, the U. S. Supreme Court refused to hear an appeal from Lofton.

=== Foster parenting in Florida ===
Although homosexuals were prohibited from adopting, the state did allow them to be foster parents or legal guardians. In 1992 a lesbian couple had filed suit (Matthews v. Weinberg 645 So. 2d 487) after the state removed a six-year-old foster child from their home on account of their sexual orientation. In 1994, the Florida Second District Court of Appeal ruled in favor of the plaintiffs, holding that the legislature had not prohibited homosexuals or unmarried couples from serving as foster parents. Thereafter, state child welfare workers placed numerous children (including victims of abuse or neglect, special needs children, and infants or toddlers with HIV or AIDS) with same-sex couples over the years, as was the case with the Gill family. As Judge Lederman noted:

Electing to parent and assume full responsibility for a child not one's own is one of the most noble decisions made in a lifetime; it is respected by many, considered by some, made by few and approved for fewer still. Here Petitioner qualifies for approval as an adoptive parent in all respects but one: his sexual orientation. The Department's position is that homosexuality is immoral. Yet homosexuals may be lawful foster parents in Florida and care for our most fragile children who have been abused, neglected and abandoned. As such, the exclusion forbidding homosexuals to adopt children does not further the public morality interest it seeks to combat. ... The contradiction between the adoption and foster care statutes defeats the public morality argument and is thus not rationally related to serving a governmental interest.

— Judge C.S. Lederman, November 2008 ruling, p. 51

During the Gill trial, the Florida Department of Children and Families, which operates the state foster care system, admitted in court that "gay people and heterosexuals make equally good parents ... that placing children with gay adoptive parents does not harm or disadvantage children emotionally or physically ... [and] that gay people could be the ideal placements for some children." At that time, there were 3,535 children in state custody needing adoptive parents.

== Issue ==
On December 11, 2004, the Florida Department of Children and Families placed two boys, who are referred to as John and James Doe in court papers, in the home of Martin Gill and his partner, who had previously fostered several other children. Four-year-old John and four-month-old James were only supposed to be with Gill temporarily, but plans for them to live with relatives fell through.

In 2006, a judge terminated the parental rights of the boys' biological parents. Gill subsequently petitioned the Florida Department of Children and Families in October 2006 to adopt the boys, but although every assessment and home study showed that the boys were thriving under the excellent care of Gill and his partner, DCF denied the petition because it violated the law against adoption by a homosexual. With the help of attorneys provided by the American Civil Liberties Union, Gill filed a petition for adoption with the circuit court in January 2007, which held a four-day hearing on the case in October 2008. The Department of Children and Families was represented by attorneys from the state Attorney General's office. Judge Lederman found in favor of the plaintiff, Gill, and granted the adoption in her ruling on November 25, 2008.

== Circuit Court ==
Over the course of a four-day trial before the Eleventh Judicial Circuit Court of Florida in Miami-Dade County, both the petitioners and the state presented evidence relating to the best interests of the children involved as well as evidence related to the legitimacy of the ban on adoption by gay men and lesbians.

A psychologist who evaluated the boys testified that it was in their best interests to be adopted by Gill, and that removing them from their home would be devastating. The boys' guardian ad litem, appointed by the court to represent their interests in the proceedings, called Gill and his partner "model parents" and their home "one of the most caring and nurturing placements" he had seen.

The ACLU, representing Gill, called expert witnesses who cited studies that found no significant differences in the stability of same-sex relationships compared to opposite-sex relationships, and no significant differences in outcomes for children raised by same-sex parents versus opposite-sex parents.

The state called Dr. George Alan Rekers, at the time an officer and scientific advisor of the National Association for Research & Therapy of Homosexuality (NARTH), who presented research (some of which had already been discredited) finding that gay men and lesbians suffered higher rates of depression, anxiety, affective disorders and substance abuse than heterosexuals and that same-sex relationships were less stable than opposite-sex ones. The state also called a second expert witness, Dr. Walter Schumm, Associate Professor of Family Studies at Kansas State University, who conceded that a case-by-case assessment of potential adoptive parents who are gay or lesbian would be more appropriate than the current blanket exclusion.

During the trial, Rekers testified that "gay people [are] mentally unstable and advised that the ban should be expanded to include Native Americans because, Rekers claimed, they are also at much higher risk of mental illness and substance abuse." However, in her ruling on the case Judge Lederman stated that the testimony of George Rekers "was far from a neutral and unbiased recitation of the relevant scientific evidence," and that "Dr. Rekers' beliefs are motivated by his strong ideological and theological convictions. ... The court cannot consider his testimony to be credible nor worthy of forming the basis of public policy."

In her order granting the petition to adopt, Judge Lederman (who had presided over many child welfare cases as Presiding Judge of the Miami-Dade Juvenile Court since 1994) found that Florida's adoption ban violated the equal protection rights of Gill and the minor children without a rational basis for doing so. The court also found that the ban violated state and federal guarantees of the children's right to permanency. The judge stated in her decision:

Reports and studies find that there are no differences in the parenting of homosexuals or the adjustment of their children. These conclusions have been accepted, adopted and ratified by the American Psychological Association, the American Psychiatry Association, the American Pediatric Association, the American Academy of Pediatrics, the Child Welfare League of America and the National Association of Social Workers. As a result, based on the robust nature of the evidence available in the field, this Court is satisfied that the issue is so far beyond dispute that it would be irrational to hold otherwise; the best interests of children are not preserved by prohibiting homosexual adoption.

== District Court of Appeal ==
The Attorney General's office immediately announced its intention to appeal the ruling. In December 2008, lawyers for Gill and the children filed a motion requesting that the Florida Supreme Court take up the case immediately, which was denied.

Oral arguments were heard by the Florida Third District Court of Appeal on August 26, 2009. Some observers believed the case would ultimately be decided by the Florida Supreme Court.

In the appeals court, state attorneys working for McCollum redoubled their efforts to maintain the ban on gay adoptions, and furthermore sought to remove the children from the Gill home, where they had resided happily for five years and, as the circuit judge found, "thrived." In November 2009, the Palm Beach Post reported:

Deputy Solicitor General Tim Osterhaus, who works for McCollum and made the oral argument on Aug. 26, was asked by Judge Vance Salter what relief the agency was seeking from the court. Osterhaus asked the three-judge panel to reverse the adoption and "make the children available for adoption."..."There was an audible gasp in the packed courtroom when the attorney general's lawyer said that," said ACLU Florida spokesman Brandon Hensler, one of the dozens of attendees during oral arguments before the 3rd District Court of Appeal in Miami in August. ... Osterhaus' response was the first mention that Gill's adopted children could be taken away, said Gill's ACLU attorney, Rob Rosenwald Jr. of Miami.

In September 2010, Governor Charlie Crist, on the heels of announcing an LGBT rights-supportive platform for his candidacy for the United States Senate, announced that he was considering dropping the appeal. Both the ACLU and the director of the state's Department of Children and Families urged Crist to not drop the suit, saying that there needs to be a final judicial resolution that applies across the entire state.

On September 22, 2010, the court unanimously struck down the ban as violating the equal protection guarantees of the Florida Constitution, stating: "The trial judge was entitled to reach the conclusion, which she did, that the Department's experts' opinions were not valid from a scientific point of view." Governor Crist hailed the decision as "a very good day for Florida; it's a great day for children. Children deserve a loving home to be in."

On October 22, 2010, Florida Attorney General Bill McCollum announced he would not pursue any further appeals of the case, effectively bringing the case and the issue of adoptions by gay men and lesbians in Florida to a close. Martin Gill's adoption of the two boys he and his partner had been raising was approved. The adoption was finalized in a ceremony in the chambers of Judge Lederman on January 19, 2011.

== Bill McCollum and the George Rekers scandal ==
Before the appeals court's final decision was rendered in September 2010, In re: Gill had gained further notability as the background to both the failed political ambitions of Attorney General Bill McCollum and the career-ending scandal of Dr. George Rekers.

McCollum specifically hired psychologist George Rekers, a proponent of conversion therapy, as the state's star expert witness in defense of its anti-gay adoption law, and Rekers was paid nearly $120,000 for his testimony on behalf of the state. McCollum wrote in 2007: "Our attorneys handling this case have searched long and hard for other expert witnesses with comparable expertise to Dr. Rekers and have been unable to identify any who would be available for this case." However, his choice of witness was criticized by Nadine Smith of the gay-rights organization Equality Florida: "Rekers is part of a small cadre of bogus pseudo scientists that charge these exorbitant fees to peddle information they know has been discredited time and time again. And people like McCollum will pay top dollar for it. There's a reason why he can't find credible sources. Because credible people don't believe this ban should exist."

In May 2010, Rekers became the subject of a sex scandal when the Miami New Times reported that he had been photographed at Miami International Airport with a 20-year-old rent boy, whom Rekers claimed to have hired merely as a "travel assistant" during a 10-day trip to Europe. The incident was subsequently covered by national and world media, leading Rekers to resign from the National Association for Research & Therapy of Homosexuality, where he had been a scientific advisor and officer. McCollum's credibility and judgment were questioned in the media, as well. The Miami Herald reported on June 5, 2010:

Disgraced psychologist George Rekers was labeled a "right-wing, religious-based" expert witness and rejected for months by state attorneys defending Florida's gay adoption ban. But when they couldn't find anyone else to replace him on the witness stand, Attorney General Bill McCollum overruled his trial attorneys, quickly hired Rekers, and paid him twice his agreed upon contract with no questions asked, according to documents released this week by McCollum's office. ...

[D]espite repeated objections from the Department of Children and Families, the attorney general agreed to advance Rekers $60,900 to get him to take the case and another $59,700 a year later as the case dragged on. The payments included $9,000 for 30 hours of searching journal articles and books, $27,000 to "read the relevant publications since Sept. 2004 and evaluate and critique the methodological quality." A year later, he charged for nearly 30 hours for reading the same materials again.

Rekers was paid to meet with the attorney general's staff to prepare for depositions and to be deposed by lawyers for the adoptive parents. McCollum said he wouldn't hire Rekers again knowing what he knows today -- but he defends the expense. "If you look at the record, you will see he actually earned it," McCollum said this week. "He definitely put the hours and the time in. This is not a case where we overpaid him.

Nevertheless, while awaiting the decision of the appeals court, McCollum told the Florida Baptist Witness on August 3, 2010, that he believed Florida law should be changed to exclude homosexuals from being foster parents as well as adoptive parents:

I really do not think that we should have homosexuals guiding our children. I think that it's a lifestyle that I don't agree with. I realize a lot of people do. It's my personal faith, religious faith, that I don't believe that the people who do this should be raising our children. It's not a natural thing. You need a mother and a father. You need a man and a woman. That's what God intended.

Asked about the Rekers scandal, McCollum said:

I would never have chosen Rekkers [sic] had I known what we now know today ... Rekkers was not an authority on this issue. He was an authority in the sense that he was a scholar. He did research into papers that other people wrote. So he was able to be used to get into evidence these matters that we needed. And it's unfortunate that all this publicity has come up over it, but the lawsuit, I think, is on sound ground and we're carrying it forward.

McCollum had announced his candidacy for governor in May 2009, but on August 24, 2010, McCollum lost the Republican primary election to Rick Scott, who was elected Governor of Florida in the general election the following November. He was succeeded in office as Attorney General by Pam Bondi on January 4, 2011.

== Statutory repeal of the adoption ban ==
The Florida Legislature undertook comprehensive adoption reform in 2015. The legislation repealed the 1977 ban on homosexual adoption. HB 7013 passed the Florida House of Representatives on a 68-50 vote on March 11. On April 15, the Florida Senate passed the bill on a 27-11 vote. Republican Governor Rick Scott signed the bill into law on June 11, and it came into effect on July 1, 2015.

== See also ==
- In re
- LGBT adoption in the United States
- LGBT rights in Florida
