= Florida Department of Children and Families =

State agency of Florida

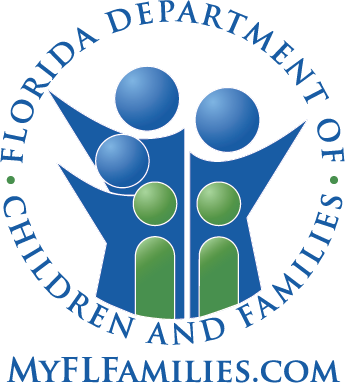

Agency overview
- Formed: 1996; 30 years ago
- Preceding agency: Department of Health and Rehabilitative Services
- Headquarters: Tallahassee, Florida
- Employees: 12,000
- Annual budget: $3 billion
- Agency executive: Vacant, Secretary
- Website: myflfamilies.com

The Florida Department of Children and Families (DCF) is a state agency of Florida. Its headquarters are at 2415 North Monroe St., Ste. 400 in Tallahassee, Florida. The department provides social services in Florida to children, adults, refugees, domestic violence victims, human trafficking victims, the homeless community, child care providers, disabled people, and the elderly.

== History ==
The department was created in 1996 when the Florida Legislature split the former Department of Health and Rehabilitative Services (HRS) into two new departments: DCF and the Florida Department of Health. The department operates the Florida Adoption Reunion Registry, which is a registry of people who are or were the principal parties in an adoption. The department operates the Florida Civil Commitment Center, in Arcadia, Florida.

=== Notable cases ===
==== Lofton v. Secretary of the Department of Children & Family Services ====
In Lofton v. Secretary of the Department of Children & Family Services, the department had denied the applications of two gay men to serve as adoptive parents, because the men were homosexuals. The United States Court of Appeals for the Eleventh Circuit upheld Florida's ban of adoption of children by homosexual persons as enforced by the Florida Department of Children and Families.

==== In re Gill ====
Florida's ban on homosexuals adopting children was later challenged in the Florida state courts. In 2006, Frank Martin Gill, an openly gay man, petitioned the department to adopt two boys, but although every assessment and home study showed that the boys were thriving under the excellent care of Gill and his partner, the department denied the petition because it violated the Florida law against adoption by a homosexual. Eleventh Judicial Circuit Court of Florida Judge Lederman found in favor of Gill, and granted the adoption in 2008. In In re Gill, Judge Lederman noted: "Here Petitioner qualifies for approval as an adoptive parent in all respects but one: his sexual orientation. The Department's position is that homosexuality is immoral. Yet homosexuals may be lawful foster parents in Florida and care for our most fragile children who have been abused, neglected and abandoned. As such, the exclusion forbidding homosexuals to adopt children does not further the public morality interest it seeks to combat. ... The contradiction between the adoption and foster care statutes defeats the public morality argument and is thus not rationally related to serving a governmental interest." During the Gill trial, the department admitted that "gay people and heterosexuals make equally good parents ... that placing children with gay adoptive parents does not harm or disadvantage children emotionally or physically ... [and] that gay people could be the ideal placements for some children." On appeal, the ban was found unconstitutional under the state Constitution of Florida in 2010 by a Florida state court of appeals, ending Florida's 33-year ban on adoptions by homosexuals. The state did not appeal the decisions further, thereby ending Florida's ban.

==== Nikolas Cruz ====
Before the 2018 Parkland high school shooting in which 19-year-old former student Nikolas Cruz murdered 17 people, and injured 17 others, a Broward County Sheriff's Office deputy had an investigator for the Florida Department of Children and Families speak to Cruz in 2016. However, Cruz's therapist said that he was "not currently a threat to himself or others" and did not need to be committed, a mental health counselor said Cruz did not meet the criteria under Florida law that allows the police to commit a mentally ill person against their will, Stoneman Douglas High School conducted a "threat assessment" on Cruz after the counselor's report, and the Florida Department of Children and Families ultimately concluded that Cruz was not a threat because he was living with his mother, attending school, and seeing a counselor.

== Appointed Secretaries ==
=== Health and Rehabilitative Services (1969–96) ===
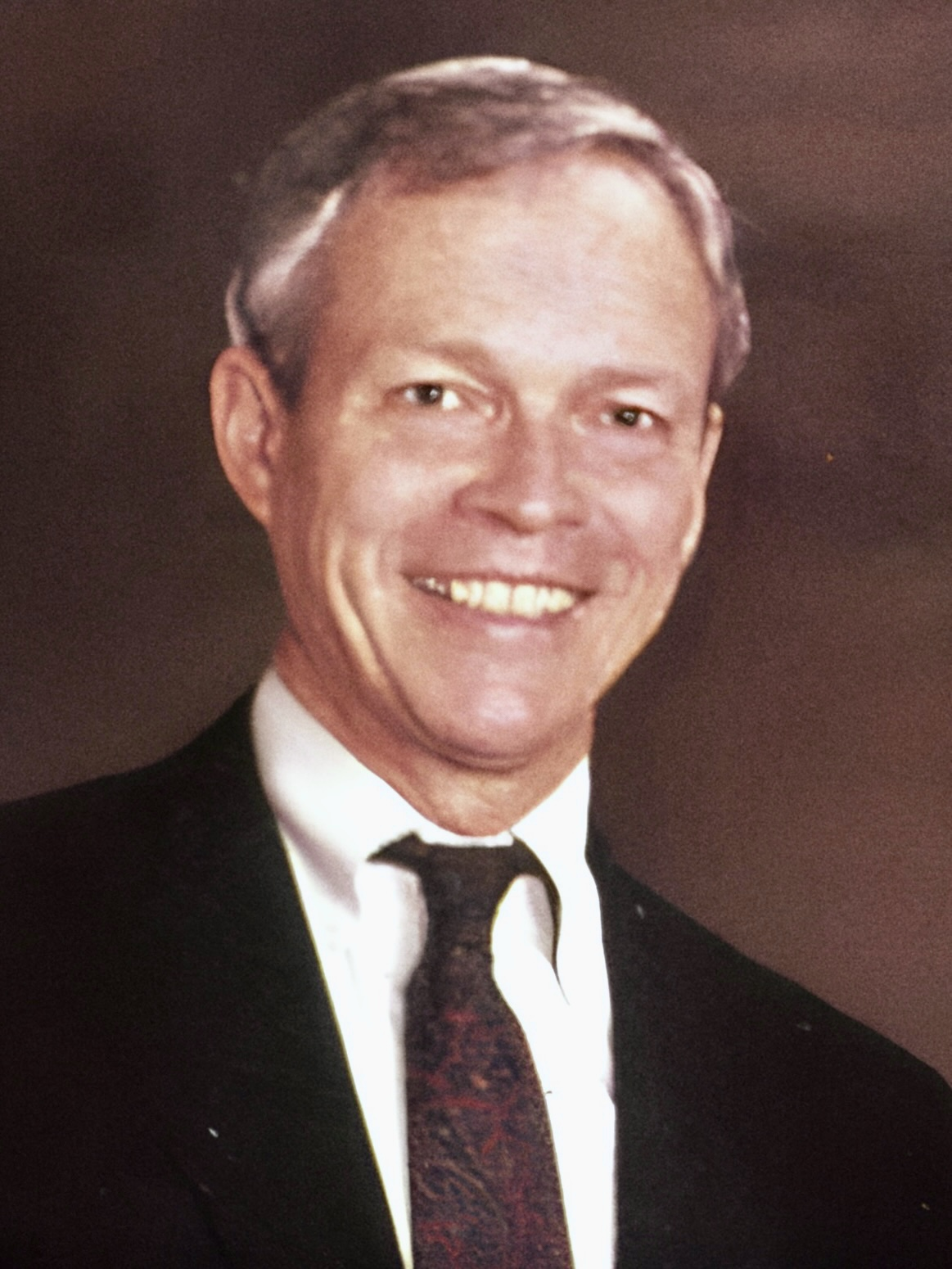
Buddy MacKay

- James A. Bax – 1969–1971
- Emmett S. Roberts – 1971–1974
- Oliver James Keller Jr. – 1974–1975
- Emmett S. Roberts – 1975
- William J. Page – 1975-1978
- Emmett S. Roberts – 1978-1979
- David H. Pingree – 1979-1980
- Alvin Taylor – 1980–1981
- David H. Pingree – 1981–1987
- Gregory L. Coler – 1987–1991
- Bob Williams – 1991–1993
- Buddy MacKay (acting) – March–July 1993
- Jim Towey – 1993–1995
- Ed Feaver – 1995–1996

=== Department of Children and Families (1997–present) ===
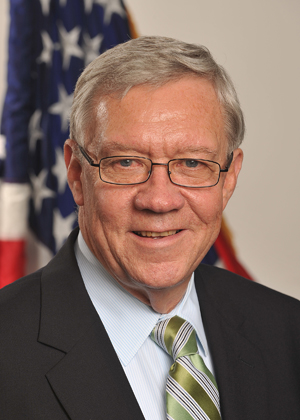
George Sheldon

- Ed Feaver – 1997–1999
- Kathleen Kearney – 1999–2002
- Jerry Regier – 2002–2004
- Lucy Hadi – 2004–2006
- Bob Butterworth – 2006–2008
- George Sheldon – 2008–2011
- David Wilkins – 2011–2013
- Esther Jacobo (interim) – 2013–2014
- Mike Carroll – 2014–2018
- Rebecca Kapusta (interim) – 2018-2019
- Chad Poppell – 2019-2021
- Shevaun Harris – 2021-2025
- Taylor Hatch – 2025-2026

== Community-Based Care ==
Community-Based Care is an initiative of DCF to improve its Child Welfare and Foster Care Services by contracting with local not-for-profit social services agencies through a competitive procurement process designed to engage community stakeholders. Its goals are to increase accountability, resource development, local community ownership, and system performance.

=== Lead Agencies ===
Region/Circuit	Lead Agency	Website
Northwest		
1	Northwest Florida Health Network	https://www.nwfhealth.org/
2,14	Northwest Florida Health Network	https://www.nwfhealth.org/
Northeast		
3,8	Partnership for Strong Families	http://www.pfsf.org
4 (Duval, Nassau)	Family Support Services of North Florida, Inc.	http://www.fssjax.org/
4 (Clay)	Kids First of Florida, Inc.	http://www.kidsfirstofflorida.org/
7 (St. Johns)	St Johns County Board of County Commissioners	http://www.co.st-johns.fl.us/fip
7 (Flagler, Volusia, Putnam)	Community Partnership for Children, Inc.	http://www.communitypartnershipforchildren.org
Suncoast		
6 (Pasco, Pinellas)	Family Support Services Suncoast	https://fssc6.org/
12	Sarasota Family YMCA, Inc.	http://www.safechildrencoalition.org/
13 (Hillsborough)	Children's Network Hillsborough	https://childrensnetworkhillsborough.org/
20	Children's Network of SW Florida	http://www.childnetswfl.org/
Central		
5	Kids Central, Inc.	http://www.kidscentralinc.org/
9, 18 (Orange, Osceola, Seminole)	Embrace Families	https://embracefamilies.org/
10	Heartland For Children	http://www.heartlandforchildren.org
18 (Brevard)	Brevard Family Partnership	http://www.brevardfp.org/
Southeast		
15, 17 (Palm Beach, Broward)	ChildNet Inc.	http://www.childnet.us/
19	Communities Connected for Kids	http://www.cckids.net/
Southern		
11,16 (Dade, Monroe)	Citrus Family Care Network	https://www.citrusfcn.com/

== See also ==
- Disappearance of Rilya Wilson, a child who was placed in the foster care system of the Florida Department of Children and Families.
