= Disappearance of Rilya Wilson =

2001 missing child case in Florida, United States

Rilya Wilson
- Born: Rilya Shenise Wilson; September 29, 1996
- Disappeared: January 18, 2001 (aged 4); Miami, Florida, U.S.
- Status: Missing for 25 years, 7 months and 28 days
- Height: 3 ft (91 cm)
- Mother: Gloria Wilson

On January 18, 2001, Rilya Shenise Wilson, a four‑year‑old American child in the custody of the Florida Department of Children and Families (DCF), disappeared from the Miami home of her caretaker, Geralyn Graham. DCF did not discover her missing until the following year, when routine checks failed to locate her at the residence. Her disappearance triggered a statewide investigation into DCF's oversight practices and exposed significant lapses in the agency’s monitoring of children in foster care.

Rilya had been placed in Graham's care after her mother, Gloria Wilson, had her parental rights terminated. Conflicting statements later emerged regarding Rilya's parentage and the nature of Graham's relationship to her, and the exact connection between the two remains unclear.

== Details involving disappearance ==
The last recorded welfare check of Rilya Wilson took place in early January 2001, by caseworker Deborah Muskelly. Rilya's caretaker, Geralyn Graham, initially told investigators that on January 18, 2001, an unidentified African-American woman claiming to work for the Florida Department of Children and Families (DCF) took Rilya for an unspecified evaluation; this was the last time she supposedly saw Rilya. Despite this, Graham continued to cash checks from the state for Rilya's care. She further claimed that Muskelly was aware of Rilya's disappearance. Graham was later jailed for identity fraud and Medicaid fraud for accepting payments on behalf of Wilson after she went missing.

Authorities denied that any state worker had ever taken Rilya for medical testing. They claimed to have first learned of Rilya's disappearance on April 25, 2002, the date she was officially reported missing. In March 2002, Muskelly and her supervisor resigned after allegations of fraud surfaced. Muskelly faced forty-one criminal charges regarding her time with DCF, including grand theft. She pled guilty to one count of official misconduct and was given five years' probation; the remaining charges were dropped. She never faced charges directly relating to Rilya's disappearance.

Manville Cash, a man currently incarcerated for auto theft and drug charges, was listed as the girl's "prospective father" on documents terminating her birth mother's parental rights. In early 2002, Cash told authorities he last saw Rilya at the home of Pamela Kendrick, Cash's aunt and sometimes mistakenly referred to as Graham's sister. Kendrick briefly had custody of Rilya in 2000 before she was removed amid allegations of neglect. In August 2004, Graham was charged with kidnapping and three counts of child abuse, and Kendrick with two lesser counts of child abuse. Kendrick testified against Graham at her trial, claiming that both of them had spanked Rilya with switches and had locked her in a dog cage and in the laundry room.

== Trial of supposed killer ==
In March 2005, a grand jury indicted Graham after she allegedly gave a detailed confession to Rilya's murder. Graham had confessed to inmate Robin Lunceford, who testified at trial over four days. In her testimony, Lunceford revealed that Graham admitted to killing Rilya because the child was "evil" and was plagued by "demons" from previous abuse. Her body was supposedly buried in a ravine close by a place Graham regularly visited for fishing and cookouts. Two other inmates also testified that Graham, while behind bars, suggested she killed the child.

Evidence of Rilya's abuse was presented at the trial, including the dog cage witnesses said Graham used to punish Rilya, and testimony about the girl's lengthy confinement in a small laundry room. Pamela Kendrick testified that Geralyn regularly tied Rilya to her bed using plastic restraints so she would not get up during the night. Graham alleged that a woman who claimed to work for DCF said she was removing Rilya from the home for evaluation and never returned.

In January 2013, the jury convicted Graham of kidnapping and child abuse, but deadlocked 11-to-1 on the charge of murder. On February 12, the judge sentenced Graham to 30 years for kidnapping plus 25 years for aggravated child abuse. Two other abuse sentences—25 years and five years, respectively—will be served concurrently for a total of 55 years behind bars. Prosecutors had sought the maximum of life plus 65 years. At 67 years old at the time of sentencing, Graham will end up serving a life sentence.

The case led to the resignation of DCF director Kathleen Kearney and the passage of several reform laws, including a new missing-child-tracking system and the contracting out of foster child casework to private organizations. Lawmakers also made it illegal to falsify records of visits between caseworkers and foster children.

== See also ==
- List of people who disappeared mysteriously: post-1970
