= Sontaku =

Japanese cultural value

Sontaku (忖度) is a concept in Japanese that could be translated as "surmising the feelings of others" or "acting upon the implicit desires of another person." This term implies an ability to assess how others are feeling, and to respond accordingly. The character "忖" signifies something like "guess" and "度" implies something akin to "extent." Although this word has ancient origins, it was not until 2017 that it became widely used in relation to Japanese political issues, and sontaku was selected by the Japanese publisher Jiyu Kokuminsha as the New Word of The Year in 2017.

According to Hayashi Kaori, (2018, par. 7):

...The word 'sontaku' is actually a perfect expression of the way Japan's severely hierarchical political and administrative apparatus operates, with underlings diligently seeking to implement what they believe to be their superiors' will....

Katada Takumi (2017, p. 104) takes this a step further, describing sontaku as an essential part of Japanese work culture.

== History ==
Kaminaga Akatsuki suggests that the first reference to sontaku was in China's earliest book of poetry, the Shijing. It also appeared in the Heian period Sugawara Family Collection (Japanese: 菅家後集). This word was occasionally used during the Edo and Meiji eras. However in those times, it only implied guessing the thoughts of others without necessarily taking any actions in response.

In 1997, the Mainichi Shimbun did publish an article in which sontaku was used to describe how some supporters of the political kingpin Ichirō Ozawa stated their intentions to carry out his goals. This marks the first time that term was used in a political context.

In a December 15, 2006, the Japanese language scholar Hiroaki Iima also used this term in a newspaper editorial to denote an attempt to guess the intentions of a superior, adding a nuanced sense of social hierarchy to this term.

Yoshitaka Kashiwagi points out that sontaku is widely used in political circles because it provides a convenient degree of plausible deniability when actions of questionable legality are undertaken on behalf of powerful politicians. Moreover, according to a January 9, 2019 Gendai Bijinesu article, sontaku was often used in euthanasia cases involving brain death or organ transplants, in which family members had the difficult task of attempting to interpret a terminal patient's intentions.

== In popular culture ==
Regarding the controversial sale of state-owned land cheaply to Moritomo Gakuen that came to light in February 2017, during a press conference to a group of foreign correspondents, the president of that school said something in Japanese that might be translated as,

I'm not talking. I think I'm doing sontaku.

When asked for a more detailed explanation, he later stated,

I think I'm doing the opposite of sontaku at this time.

As a result of this verbal flub, the term sontaku has become widely associated with that press conference, and the number of online searches for that term briefly skyrocketed.

Indeed, in Japan the word sontaku has become widely associated with the Moritomo Gakuen scandal. Keen to capitalize on the growing interest in this term and also to turn a profit, the Heso Productions food corporation of Osaka has even started marketing "sontaku manju" sweets with the buzzword engraved on each bun. According to the @DIME site, roughly 200,000 boxes of such confectionary were initially sold, and as of 2020 over 400,000 boxes of these sweet bean pastries have been purchased. Moreover, realizing the power of popular phrases to push products, in 2017 FamilyMart released a "sontaku gozen" lunch box that enjoyed brisk sales.

On December 1, 2017 sontaku was selected as the annual winner of Jiyu Kokuminsha's annual New and Popular Word Award. The person actually accepting that award was Minoru Inamoto, the CEO of Heso Productions. Moreover, on December 3, this term was selected for the Sanseido "New Word of the Year 2017" Grand Prize. In addition, it was also listed as the winner of Yahoo! Japan's 2017 Buzzword of the Year Award.

== English translations ==
It is difficult to translate the word sontaku precisely into English. During a February 2017 press conference, Yasunori Kagoike, who was the president of Moritomo Gakuen, acknowledged that the term sontaku had no satisfactory English equivalent.

Expressions such as "surmise" and "read between the lines" have been suggested, but these do not quite capture the same nuance as the Japanese term. DeepL's Linguee database has proposed "surmise (about somebody's feelings)" as one possible translation.

Linda Sieg has proposed that "following unspoken orders" is another choice that may be apt. "Anticipatory obedience" is another choice how to translate.

== See also ==
- Anticipatory obedience
- Chilling effect
- False consensus effect
- Self-censorship
- Spiral of silence
- Social-desirability bias
