= Florida Senate Bill 254 (2023) =

Proposed legislation

Florida Legislature
- Territorial extent: Florida
- Considered by: Florida Senate
- Signed by: Ron DeSantis
- Signed: May 17, 2023

Legislative history
- Bill citation: SB 254
- Introduced by: Clay Yarborough
- Introduced: March 3, 2023
- Committee responsible: Health Policy, Fiscal Policy
- Status: In force

Florida Senate Bill 254 (SB 254) is a law that prohibits gender-affirming care for anyone under the age of 18 and also places restrictions on adult patients accessing this care. It allows the state to take temporary custody of children who may be receiving, or are planning to receive, gender-affirming care. The bill has been widely criticized by LGBTQ rights groups and individuals.

In June 2024, a judge permanently blocked the law from taking effect. In August 2024, the 11th Circuit Court of Appeals stayed the permanent injunction while the matter is appealed.

== Legislation ==
SB 254 was filed on March 3, 2023 by Florida Senator Clay Yarborough and co-introduced by Senator Keith Perry. Yarborough described it as a "comprehensive package of parental empowerment and child safety legislation." In spite of the bill being associated with restricting gender affirming care for minors, it also bars adults from seeking access to hormones and healthcare without first obtaining consent from a medical provider.

On May 4, 2023, the Florida Senate approved it by a vote of 26–13 and the Florida House by a vote of 83–28. The law came into force when Governor DeSantis signed it on May 17, 2023.

The approved version of the bill amended the Florida Statutes to enforce a child custody law specifically for a minor who had been or may have received gender-affirming care:

- Section 61.517, Subsection (1): amended to give Florida courts "temporary emergency jurisdiction if the child is present in this state and ... the child has been subjected to or is threatened with being subjected to sex-reassignment prescriptions or procedures, as defined in s. 456.001." This means that Florida courts could apply the law to children visiting Florida.
- Section 61.534, Subsection (1): when someone seeks "enforcement of a child custody determination", they may apply for "a warrant to take physical custody of the child if the child is likely to imminently suffer serious physical harm" including "being subjected to sex-reassignment prescriptions or procedures as defined in s. 456.001."

Early drafts of the bill differed on whether, in the case that a custodial parent received gender-affirming care, a child could be seized from their family.

=== Impact on transgender rights and healthcare providers ===
The law requires transgender patients over the age of 18 to be provided an informed consent form provided by the State of Florida, requiring that consent must be written and "in the same room" as the provider. All "sex reassignment prescriptions or procedures" must be prescribed only by physicians. Renewals are allowed for previous lawful prescriptions, but any new prescription or procedure must follow the new guidelines. Since the majority of transgender care in the state of Florida is provided either through tele-health or by nurse practitioners/APPs, the law had an immediate and significant impact on the provision of adult transgender care in the state.

Additionally, health care providers were required to explicitly state that they could not provide gender-affirming treatment to minors; if medical providers did not provide this statement, they could lose their license.

Following the implementation of SB 254, studies have highlighted the challenges transgender patients face in accessing gender-affirming care. A study of transgender and nonbinary young adults in Florida found that participants reported difficulties accessing gender-affirming care, particularly hormone therapy. The legislation required transgender and nonbinary people seeking gender-affirming medical treatment to have an in-person appointment with a physician and sign a consent form before receiving treatment. Although the law was signed in May 2023, the required consent form for adult patients was not released until August 22, 2023. The form stated gender-affirming medical treatment is based on "limited, poor-quality research," suggesting the benefits may not outweigh the risks. Additionally, some participants reported canceled appointments, delays in treatment, and difficulties obtaining prescription refills.

Healthcare providers have also expressed concerns that legislation restricting gender-affirming care could affect their ability to provide treatment in aligned with established standards of care and evidence-based practices. A study of healthcare providers found that nearly all participants were concerned that legislation banning gender-affirming care for transgender adolescents could negatively affect their mental health, including increasing the risk of suicidal ideation and suicide. Another study found that transgender and nonbinary youth who initiated puberty blockers or gender-affirming hormones had 60% lower odds of depression and 73% lower odds of suicidality over a 12-month period compared with those who had not initiated these interventions.

== Legal challenges ==
In June 2022, Florida Surgeon General Dr. Joseph Ladapo wrote a letter to the Florida Board of Medicine requesting it to review guidance regarding gender-affirming treatment for minors, stating that “the current standards set by numerous professional organizations appear to follow a preferred political ideology instead of the highest level of generally accepted medical science.”

In March 2023, Florida families filed Doe v. Ladapo in the U.S. District Court for the Northern District of Florida, challenging restrictions on gender-affirming healthcare for transgender minors. The plaintiffs argued that the restrictions violated the Equal Protection Clause of the Fourteenth Amendment and interfered with parents' rights to make medical decisions for their children. The lawsuit was later expanded to include adult transgender plaintiffs affected by SB 254.

On June 6, 2023, US District Court Judge Robert Hinkle blocked the ban on healthcare for minors while further legal challenges play out, saying it "is likely to be found unconstitutional". On September 12, 2023, a federal judge declined to block the restrictions for adults. On June 11, 2024, Hinkle issued a ruling permanently blocking the whole law from taking effect and not just the section for children. DeSantis vowed to appeal the ruling to the 11th Circuit of Appeals. In August 2024, the 11th Circuit Court of Appeals stayed the permanent injunction while the matter is appealed.

== Criticism ==
Former Florida state representative Carlos Guillermo Smith referred to the bill as "fascism." Human rights attorney Alejandra Caraballo warned that the bill could lead to state-sponsored kidnapping. Kara Gross, the legislative director of ACLU of Florida, released a statement condemning the bill, stating: "the Florida Legislature's insistence on targeting trans people is bizarre, unnecessary, unconstitutional, and extremely dangerous."
