= Anticipatory obedience =

Pre-emptive following of authority

Anticipatory obedience is the act of preemptively conforming to what is expected to be desired by an authority figure, often without explicit orders. In other cases, it may manifest as refusing to challenge an authority's demands, even when it remains possible. This behavior of self-censorship and complying in advance has been historically significant, particularly in authoritarian regimes, where it has facilitated the swift implementation of policies and actions that might otherwise face resistance.

Yale Law professor and historian Timothy Snyder has described the dangers of this behavior as: "individuals think ahead about what a more repressive government will want and then offer themselves without being asked. A citizen who adapts in this way is teaching power what it can do."

== Historical context ==
The concept of anticipatory obedience is particularly noted in the context of Nazi Germany. In early 1938, as Adolf Hitler prepared to annex Austria, the anticipatory obedience of many Austrians played a critical role in the persecution of Austrian Jews. Without explicit orders, local Austrians and Nazis began to enforce anti-Semitic policies, such as forcing Jews to scrub streets clean of symbols of independent Austria. This preemptive action by ordinary citizens and local officials taught Nazi leaders that the public would comply with extreme measures, leading to further atrocities like the November 1938 Kristallnacht pogrom in Germany.

Historian of science Ute Deichmann described the concept of anticipatory obedience to analyze the "voluntary alignment" of scientific institutions with political ideologies. In her study of the Third Reich, Deichmann documented that many German scientists and university administrators did not wait for official decrees to expel Jewish colleagues. Instead, they acted preemptively to signal loyalty and secure state support. Deichmann argues that this mechanism is also observable in modern democracies and in a 2023 analysis, she observed that leading scientific journals and university senates sometimes act in "anticipatory obedience" to social movements or administrative policies to avoid controversy, which she contends can threaten fundamental scientific norms such as universalism and objectivity.

== Psychological insights ==
Anticipatory obedience is related to broader psychological principles of obedience to authority, as explored in Stanley Milgram's famous experiments in the 1960s. These experiments demonstrated that individuals are often willing to harm others if they believe they are following orders from an authority figure. In Obedience to Authority: An Experimental View, Milgram studied direct orders, but anticipatory obedience can be seen as an extension of this principle, where individuals or groups align their actions with what they anticipate an authority desires, often exacerbating the potential for harm.

== Modern applications ==
=== In business ===
Beyond historical examples, anticipatory obedience is also observed in modern corporate and organizational settings. Employees may conform to the perceived expectations of their superiors without explicit directives, which can stifle innovation and reinforce existing power structures. This behavior, while sometimes intended to avoid conflict or preempt negative outcomes, can lead to a culture of compliance that limits the potential for change and progress.

=== In the second Trump administration ===
During the second Trump administration, law firms which had acted unfavorably towards Donald Trump's views were targeted. Several law firms complied and reached deals with the Trump administration to provide free services, other firms sued the Trump administration to push back against the targeting. Some of the law firms that complied later discovered that Trump would seek free counsel from them more broadly than originally stated, while some of their clients abandoned them for law firms that fought back. The law firms that did not comply later won their lawsuit against Trump, which was not appealed by the Trump administration.

Prior to Trump's election as president in 2024, some news channels and newspapers made changes to their reporting. In the lead up to the 2024 election, CNN dismissed Jeff Zucker and replaced him with Chris Licht, who later fired many reporters who were critical of the president. Trump sued ABC News over the statement by George Stephanopoulos that a jury found him "liable for rape", which he alleged was defamation. The judge in the case wrote that the jury found Trump liable for actions "many people commonly understand [by] the word 'rape.'" ABC News reached a settlement of $15 million with Trump, with an additional $1 million to cover Trump's legal fees. Observers, like Norman L. Eisen, writing for Slate, stated that it should have been an easy case for ABC News to win, given the judge's analysis and the fact that Trump would have to prove malicious intent. He added that it fit the definition of anticipatory obedience.

In January 2025, the American Association of University Professors (AAUP) published a statement "Against Anticipatory Obedience" warning the higher education community against preemptively complying with anticipated political attacks, especially from the Trump administration and state governments targeting academic freedom. It urged faculty and administrators to vigorously oppose these efforts and not to surrender in advance.

== See also ==
- Chilling effect
- Civil disobedience
- False consensus effect
- Milgram experiment
- Self-censorship
- Spiral of silence
- Social-desirability bias
- Totalitarianism
- Sontaku
