= Lofton v. Secretary of the Department of Children & Family Services =

Court order denying homosexuals freedom to adopt children

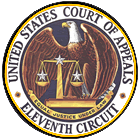
- No. 01-16723
- Court: United States Court of Appeals for the Eleventh Circuit
- Full case name: Steven Lofton, et al. v. Secretary of the Department of Children and Family Services, et al
- Decided: January 28, 2004
- Citation: 358 F.3d 804

Case history
- Subsequent actions: U.S. Supreme Court; 2005: Petition for certiorari denied

Holding
- Florida's ban on homosexuals adopting children is constitutional

Court membership
- Judges sitting: Stanley F. Birch, Jr., Edward Earl Carnes, Procter Ralph Hug, Jr.

Case opinions
- Majority: Birch, joined by unanimous

Lofton v. Secretary of the Department of Children & Family Services, is a 2004 decision from the United States Court of Appeals for the Eleventh Circuit upholding Florida's ban of adoption of children by homosexual persons as enforced by the Florida Department of Children and Families.

== Federal District Court ==
The plaintiffs applied for adoptions and their applications were rejected because they were homosexuals. Four of the plaintiffs were legal guardians or foster parents of the children, who were also plaintiffs. They filed suit in the United States District Court for the Southern District of Florida, asking it to enjoin enforcement of the law. They also sought class certification for all persons similarly situated.

The court considered five questions on whether the law violated:

- the right to familial privacy under the Fourteenth Amendment
- the right to intimate association
- the right to family integrity
- the right to sexual privacy
- equal protection on the basis of sexual orientation

On August 21, 2001 District court judge James Lawrence King rejected class certification and granted summary judgment in favor of defendants.

== Court of Appeals ==
The Court noted that "adoption is not a right; it is a statutory privilege" and that adoption is wholly a creature of the state. It then noted that in "formulating its adoption policies and procedures, the State of Florida acts in the protective and provisional role of in loco parentis for those children who, because of various circumstances, have become wards of the state. Thus, adoption law is unlike criminal law, for example, where the paramount substantive concern is not intruding on individuals' liberty interests" and that it is "also distinct from such contexts as government-benefit eligibility schemes or access to a public forum, where equality of treatment is the primary concern." The Court held that "the state's overriding interest is the best interests of the children whom it is seeking to place with adoptive families", and "the state can make classifications for adoption purposes that would be constitutionally suspect in many other arenas".

Because adoption is a public act, the plaintiffs-appellants were "asking the state to confer official recognition — and, consequently, the highest level of constitutional insulation from subsequent state interference". The Court noted that "appellants have not cited to us, nor have we found, a single precedent in which the Supreme Court or one of our sister circuits has sustained a constitutional challenge to an adoption scheme or practice by any individual other than a natural parent, and even many challenges by natural parents have failed".

The court rejected the family integrity claim. It said that in arguing that there is a fundamental right to family integrity, "appellants argue[d] that parental and familial rights should be extended to individuals such as foster parents and legal guardians and that the touchstone of this liberty interest is not biological ties or official legal recognition, but the emotional bond that develops between and among individuals as a result of shared daily life". The Court concluded that plaintiffs "could [not have had] justifiable expectation of permanency in their relationships and that even if an expectation of permanency was created, "[t]he resulting liberty interest at most would provide procedural due process protection in the event the state were to attempt to remove [the children] Doe or Roe" and that "[s]uch a procedural right does not translate, however, into a substantive right to be free from state inference. Nor does it create an affirmative right to be accorded official recognition as "parent" and "child."

In dealing with sexual privacy claim, the Court first asked if sexual privacy was a fundamental right. Plaintiffs-appellants argued that "the Supreme Court's recent decision in Lawrence v. Texas, which struck down Texas's sodomy statute, identified a hitherto unarticulated fundamental right to private sexual intimacy. They contend that the Florida statute, by disallowing adoption to any individual who chooses to engage in homosexual conduct, impermissibly burdens the exercise of this right." The Court noted that nowhere in Lawrence was it announced that homosexual sodomy was a fundamental right and that Lawrence did not "locate this right directly in the Constitution, but instead treated it as the by-product of several different constitutional principles and liberty interests." It noted that the Supreme Court had "exercise the utmost care whenever [it is] asked to break new ground" in the field of fundamental rights" It also noted that Lawrence did not use "strict scrutiny, the proper standard when fundamental rights are implicated, but instead invalidated the Texas statute on rational-basis grounds" and that "the asserted liberty interest is not the negative right to engage in private conduct without facing criminal sanctions, but the affirmative right to receive official and public recognition". The Court concluded that "the Lawrence decision cannot be extrapolated to create a right to adopt for homosexual persons".

In addressing the equal protection challenge, the Court used the rational basis standard, declining to hold that homosexuals are a suspect class. It noted that "[r]ational-basis review, a paradigm of judicial restraint, does not provide a license for courts to judge the wisdom, fairness, or logic of legislative choices." The defendants-appellees had argued that the law "is rationally related to Florida's interest in furthering the best interests of adopted children by placing them in families with married mothers and fathers" and that "disallowing adoption into homosexual households, which are necessarily motherless or fatherless and lack the stability that comes with marriage, is a rational means of furthering Florida's interest in promoting adoption by marital families." Plaintiffs-appellants had argued that "the statute is not rationally related to this interest", being "overinclusive and underinclusive." The Court rejected appellants' arguments, holding that "The Florida legislature could rationally conclude that homosexuals and heterosexual singles are not "similarly situated in relevant respects." It is not irrational to think that heterosexual singles have a markedly greater probability of eventually establishing a married household and, thus, providing their adopted children with a stable, dual-gender parenting environment. Moreover, as the state noted, the legislature could rationally act on the theory that heterosexual singles, even if they never marry, are better positioned than homosexual individuals to provide adopted children with education and guidance relative to their sexual development throughout pubescence and adolescence." The Court rejected a comparison with Romer v. Evans noting that "Florida's statute is not so "[s]weeping and comprehensive" as to render Florida's rationales for the statute "inexplicable by anything but animus" toward its homosexual residents. Amendment 2 deprived homosexual persons of "protections against exclusion from an almost limitless number of transactions and endeavors that constitute ordinary civic life in a free society." In contrast to this "broad and undifferentiated disability," the Florida classification is limited to the narrow and discrete context of access to the statutory privilege of adoption and, more importantly, has a plausible connection with the state's asserted interest. Moreover, not only is the effect of Florida's classification dramatically smaller, but the classification itself is narrower. Whereas Amendment 2's classification encompassed both conduct and status, Florida's adoption prohibition is limited to conduct. Thus, we conclude that Romer's unique factual situation and narrow holding are inapposite to this case." thus, the Court rejected the equal protection claim.

Plaintiffs petitioned for en banc rehearing, which was denied. Judge Rosemary Barkett dissented from the denial of rehearing, noting that "[w]hile Florida claims that it has singled out homosexuals because it wishes to limit adoptions to married couples, the statute in this case says absolutely nothing about married couples. In fact, Florida's adoption statute expressly provides for single persons to adopt".

The plaintiffs petitioned the Supreme Court for a writ of certiorari. It was denied.

== Subsequent Developments ==
Florida's ban on homosexuals adopting children was later challenged in the Florida state courts. In In re Gill it was found unconstitutional under the state Constitution of Florida on September 22, 2010 by a Florida state court of appeals. The state did not appeal the decisions further thereby ending Florida's ban.

== Comparison with Cook v. Gates ==
In contrast, the First Circuit held in Cook v. Gates, 528 F.3d 42 (1st Cir. 2008), that heightened scrutiny applied to substantive due process sexual privacy challenges, as opposed to the rational basis review used by the 11th Circuit in Lofton.
