= Homelessness in Florida =

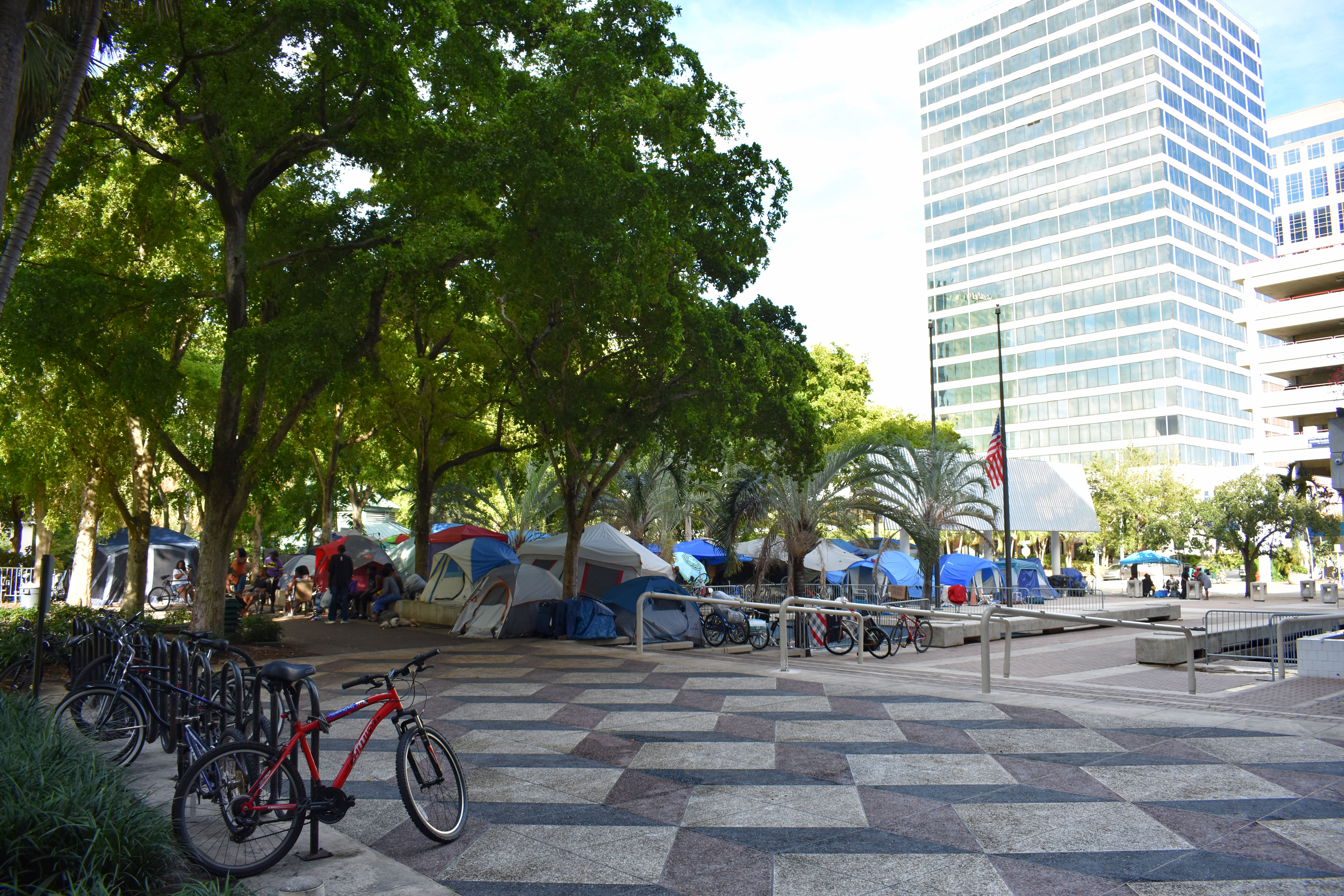
Near the Broward County Main Library in Fort Lauderdale, Florida, is a tent city adjacent to the Historic Walkway. The camp relocated from Stranahan Park to the library in 2017.

According to the United States Interagency Council on Homelessness (USICH), there are an estimated 32,190 homeless individuals in Florida as of January 2017. 2,846 are family households, 2,019 are unaccompanied young adults (aged 18–24), 2,817 are veterans, and 5,615 are individuals experiencing chronic homelessness. According to a January 2020 count, the estimate decreased to 27,487. According to the U.S. Department of Housing and Urban Development, as of December 2022, the estimate for homeless individuals dropped to 25,959, about 5% of the total U.S. homeless population.

== History ==
During the 2010s and early 2020s, Florida recorded an average of approximately 30,000 homeless residents per year. This equates to around 13 individuals per 100,000 residents, or 0.13% of the population—slightly below the national average of 0.18%.

Based on a 2016 report from the Florida Coalition for the Homeless, Pinellas County had the highest concentrations of homelessness, with nearly 3,000 individuals experiencing homelessness out of a general population of approximately one million (0.3%). While Miami-Dade County recorded a higher total number of homeless individuals (4,235), its larger population base of around six million results in a lower rate of about 0.08%, which aligns more closely with both the state and national averages. Monroe County, with an estimated population of 75,000, had 575 homeless individuals reported in 2016, resulting in a prevalence of approximately 0.8%.

== General poverty in Florida ==
In 2016, the U.S. Census Bureau reported that 3,116,886 people in Florida were in poverty, or 15.7% of the state's population. 22.8% of them are children. According to the new data published by the U.S. Census Bureau, the percentage of Floridians living in poverty has decreased from 15.7% to 13.1% as of 2021. Begging and panhandling are often a consequence of pervasive poverty due to the need to source money. When focusing on laws against begging and panhandling, it is important to recognize that people become beggars and panhandlers for various reasons. They could be in that situation because of socio-economic issues, disability, loss of income due to natural disasters, discrimination due to being a minority group, lack of education, health issues, and many more. Consequently, the approach to these social issues must be responsive to people's needs to escape poverty and to stop begging.

== Cost of accountability and services ==
In 2013, a Central Florida Commission on Homelessness study indicated that the region spends $31,000 a year per homeless person to cover "salaries of law-enforcement officers to arrest and transport homeless individuals — largely for nonviolent offenses such as trespassing, public intoxication or sleeping in parks — as well as the cost of jail stays, emergency-room visits and hospitalization for medical and psychiatric issues." This did not include "money spent by nonprofit agencies to feed, clothe and sometimes shelter these individuals". In contrast, the report estimated the cost of permanent supportive housing at "$10,051 per person per year" and concluded that "[h]ousing even half of the region's chronically homeless population would save taxpayers $149 million during the next decade — even allowing for 10 percent to end up back on the streets again." This particular study followed 107 long-term-homeless residents living in Orange, Osceola, and Seminole Counties. There are similar studies showing large financial savings in Charlotte and Southeastern Colorado from focusing on simply housing the homeless.

== Affordable housing ==
Affordable housing refers to privately owned housing that receives a subsidy to bring its rent or purchase price down to a level affordable to a low-or moderate-income family.

In December 2022, Senate President Kathleen Passidomo, R-Naples, endorsed legislation that would allow the conversion of retail spaces such as shopping centers and empty office buildings into affordable housing for Florida residents. The legislation endorsed by the Senate President Passidomo builds upon a law passed in 2020 that removed the requirement for locations approved for affordable housing construction to be rezoned from commercial to residential. According to Realtor.com, in February 2022, Miami was the least affordable rental market. In April 2023, Florida passed more legislation (SB 102) aimed at providing more Floridians with affordable housing through the use of "incentives, tax breaks, and $811,000,000 in funding". The law also cemented in place that it is no longer required for locations approved for affordable housing construction to be rezoned from commercial to residential. SB 102, the "Live Local Act," is the largest affordable housing act ever passed in the state and has put a stop to one of the ways local governments have used in the past to limit or deny affordable housing projects. The bill went into effect on July 1, 2023.

== Panhandling ==
Florida law addresses panhandling on impeding traffic and roadways, while city ordinances increasingly focus on behaviors and the locations of panhandling or begging.

The National Veterans Homeless Support Initiative succinctly phrased current approaches to dealing with panhandling as "kick[ing] the can down the road", referring to the city of Melbourne in Florida's new punitive sweeping ban on panhandling, adding locations such as ATMs and bus stops to its list of locations individuals can be incriminated for. In 2016, Sarasota's panhandling laws were broadened to be stricter and include all forms of solicitation. The local police department also updated its approach to be more punitive by requiring police to remove unattended items in the streets such as personal items. Those who do not have a home in many Florida cities are facing the dilemma of being outlawed for begging to make money and then criminalized again for being homeless and having nowhere to place their belongings, compounding systemic social issues within the communities. In Lake Worth Beach, Florida, ordinance No. 2014-3 effectively bans panhandling across the entire city. It allows authorities to penalize individuals with a 60-day jail term or a $500 fine. This has broader systemic issues on the mass incarceration dilemma within the American prison industrial complex because this results increased numbers of those involved in these activities being arrested and ending up within the prison system. An issue with begging and panhandling laws across Florida and more broadly is the "selective enforcement of public spaces" and this is becoming more prevalent with tougher rules across cities in Florida which give police new powers.

In 2007, St. Petersburg, Florida passed six ordinances aimed at homelessness and begging, including banning the storage of belongings in public spaces and making it illegal to sleep in many public areas. In 2006, Orlando, Florida passed ordinances that banned groups from feeding more than 25 people in public parks. In 2011, Huffington Post reported how the activist group Food Not Bombs had twelve members arrested for feeding panhandlers and beggars in Orlando, illustrating a new shift in ordinance punitive-ness aiming at not just those begging or panhandling but those willing to give. In Fort Lauderdale, Florida, it is forbidden to give food to the homeless in parks, also illustrating the extent of anti-panhandling laws and their expansion in society. A report called Criminalising Crises, published by The National Law Centre on Homelessness and Poverty (NLCHP), highlights how the legal system criminalizes homelessness and does nothing to solve social problems. For example, in Alachua County, Florida, police can issue 'Notice to Appear' options for many offenses, including panhandling, but this requires a permanent address. Many panhandlers do not have an address, and consequently the police must arrest the individual, placing them in jails instead of dealing with their homelessness. The NLCHP also published a report, "No Safe Place," which highlights one of Florida's cities with the strongest criminalization policies: Clearwater, Florida. Clearwater has nearly half of its homeless population (42%) without access to emergency housing or affordable housing, and like other cities, such as Orlando, it heavily punishes sleeping or sitting in public and panhandling or begging.

Creative Housing Solutions in Florida found that to reduce the cycle of homeless and beggars going through the criminal justice and health care systems, it would be more sustainable to provide permanent housing to the chronically homeless, saving Central Florida $21,000 per person in law enforcement costs.

Some anti-panhandling laws have been found to be unconstitutional. Tampa's 2013 ordinance, which banned panhandling in the downtown area, was ruled unconstitutional by a federal judge in 2016. Sarasota also revised its panhandling and solicitation laws in response to this decision.

== Deterrence controversies ==
In July 2019, officials in West Palm Beach, Florida, were criticized for playing a continuous loop of the children's songs Baby Shark and Raining Tacos throughout the night outside city-owned Waterfront Lake Pavilion rental banquet facility as a way of deterring rough sleepers.

In a video published by PBS on December 13, 2015, titled "Debate over how to treat the homeless simmers in Sarasota, as more cities crack down," explains both the progressive and regressive measures Sarasota, Florida, has taken in its attempts to solve the homeless issue. Some of these measures include "criminalizing sleeping outside in public or private property without permission", the removal of public benches in parks that are often used by homeless residents in the area to sleep on, and the creation of joint effort teams of police officers and social workers specifically tasked with dealing with homeless residents hands-on.

== Sex offenders and legality ==
A special problem exists in Miami-Dade County, in which restrictive local legislation makes it almost impossible for sex offenders to find legal housing. About 300 are homeless as of 2018 (see Julia Tuttle Causeway sex offender colony).

== Violence ==
Like with many homeless communities in the US, violence is an issue that takes place in homeless tent encampments, trailer encampments, and shelters. This includes both crimes of unhoused people victimizing fellow unhoused people, and housed people committing a crime against an unhoused person, sometimes solely or mainly due to the fact that their victim was of an unhoused state. Two homeless men were murdered in Miami, one stabbed dead in October 2021 and one shot dead in December 2021, allegedly by the same person. On the same day of the December shooting, a homeless man was shot and wounded several hours prior. The suspect, a housed 25-year-old real estate agent, was arrested in December and charged with two counts of murder. He was formally charged in February.

== See also ==
- Homelessness in the United States by state
