= Memorial Day Pensacola Beach Pride =

Annual LGBT beach gathering in Florida, US

Gay Memorial Day Weekend in Pensacola is an annual beach gathering of thousands of LGBT locals and tourists during the Memorial Day holiday weekend.

== History ==
The summer event has roots back to the 1960s.

=== Emma Jones Society on Independence Day ===
A local gay couple invited a group of gay friends to the beach for Independence Day. Until the mid-1970s the gathering was held during Fourth of July weekend. This group, also known as the Emma Jones Society, hosted this gather during the years, which during the late 1960s and early 1970s was held at the San Carlos Hotel (since demolished) in downtown Pensacola. Events there included impersonations, skits, drag queen performances, and a male beauty pageant, Mr. U.S. Gay. These parties ended in 1975.

=== Rebirth on Memorial Day ===
The idea of a summer gather rejuvenated in the early 80s being focused at the beginning of the summer during Memorial Day weekend. In the late-1980s, Atlanta's Steve Berman began to host circuit parties and the event continued to grow. In the mid-1990s, New Orleans bar-owner Johnny Chisholm took over events after purchasing the now-defunct LGBT bar Emerald City.

=== Disasters of the 2000s ===
The weekend celebration was at a peak until Hurricane Ivan hit during 2004, followed just months later by Hurricane Dennis. Area recovery from these severe weather disasters dampened the event for a few years. The BP oil spill also affected the event's growth and offerings following that 2010 disaster in the Gulf of Mexico.

== Events ==
Memorial Day Weekend in Pensacola consists of two types of activities.

The most promoted, for obvious commercial reasons, are the circuit parties. They are hosted and run by local and traveling companies who set up large, elaborate sound systems, light shows, and hire well-known professional DJ's. Tickets to the mainly alcohol-free events can be over $75 with discounts available for multiple party tickets. The parties often start late, some at 11:00 p.m. and do not end until shortly before sunrise.

The second type of activity, though probably more heavily attended than the circuit parties, is simply sitting on the beach. There are literally thousands of large shade tents and dozens that are elaborately outfitted with themed decors, full wet bars, and hand-dug jacuzzis. Most of this crowd begins to arrive around 6:45 a.m. in time to see the last circuit party-goer leaving.

== Pensacola Girl Fest “Sexacola” ==
For the women, there's Pensacola Girl Fest “Sexacola”. Pensacola Girl Fest (PGF) and the event “Sexacola” was established in 2010, It is owned and operated by the owners of My Sister’s Room (MSR) is the longest standing lesbian bar in the South and has successfully been promoting and activating exceptional events for the LGBTQ+ community for over 25 years.

The events are high energy with activity on the stage at all times. From fire performers, gogo dancers, burlesque, drag, celebrity host and emcees. this event doesn’t have a dull moment!

This event is held at the Dock on Pensacola Beach Island

== Criticism and response ==
The event, especially since its popularity grew, has been denounced by local religious leaders and groups for decades including on-site protesters at several of the event venues around the area.

In 1993, City of Pensacola officials spoke out about not wanting to be associated with or known as being a "gay-friendly" destination. Yet, the positive economic impact on the area has hushed most of the disdain of local conservatives.
