= Nadine Smith =

American LGBTQ+ rights activist (born 1965)

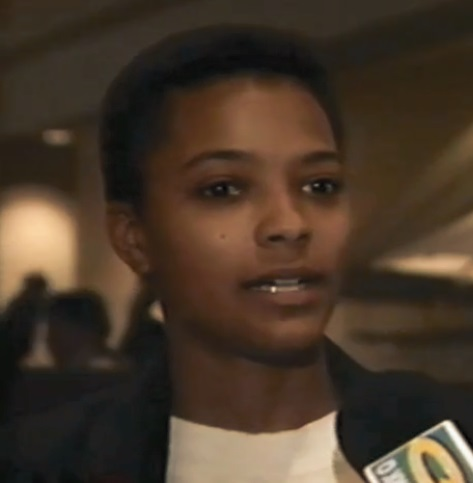
- Smith at the 1993 National Gay and Lesbian Task Force's Creating Change Conference
- Born: August 27, 1965 (age 61); Bangor, Maine, U.S.
- Education: University of South Florida (BA, 1987)
- Organization: Equality Florida
- Movement: LGBT rights movement
- Spouse: Andrea Hildebran (m. 2012)
- Children: 1

Nadine Smith (born August 27, 1965) is an LGBT activist and has been the executive director of Equality Florida since its inception in 1997 and serves as a legislative lobbyist, living in Tallahassee during session. In 1986, Smith served on the founding board of the International Gay and Lesbian Organization. Smith has been recognized as a national leader by organizations including: National Gay and Lesbian Task Force, Human Rights Campaign, Human Rights Task Force of Florida, National Center for Lesbian Rights (NCLR) and the National Black Lesbian and Gay Leadership Forum.

A former journalist, Smith has written syndicated columns for various gay and mainstream publications. Smith was an award-winning investigative journalist for WUSF, the National Public Radio affiliate in Tampa, and later became a reporter for the Tampa Tribune. Smith also freelanced for national and local publications.

== Early life and education ==
Smith was born in Bangor, Maine but her family relocated to Panama City, Florida when she was young. She graduated from Rutherford High School.

After graduating high school, Smith attended the U.S. Air Force Academy in Panama City. She later left after the passage of Don't Ask, Don't Tell in 1993.

Smith graduated from the University of South Florida with a degree in Mass Communication in 1987.

== Career ==
Smith was the first openly lesbian African-American to run for Tampa City Council, earning the most votes in the primary and garnering 42% in the run-off in 1991.

In 1993, Smith was part of the historic oval office meeting between then-incumbent President of the United States Bill Clinton and LGBT social movements leaders. Smith was co-chair of the 1993 March on Washington, coordinating national and international media.

Smith served as campaign manager for Citizens for a Fair Tampa in 1995, a successful effort to prevent the repeal of the city's human rights ordinance, which included sexual orientation.

Smith served on the Board for Fairness for All Families from 2006-2009, a grassroots effort to protect LGBT families in the face of a ballot measure that banned recognition of marriage between same sex couples. The measure which passed with approx 62% of the vote also banned protection that are "substantial equivalent of marriage".

In 2007, Smith was arrested at a Largo City Council hearing after handing someone a flier that had the words "Don't Discriminate" printed on it. The council was debating whether or not to fire Susan Stanton, the transgender city manager.

In 2023, Smith earned $297,381 in compensation from Equality Florida Institute Inc and $52,479 from Equality Florida Action Inc.

== Awards and honors ==
- In 2016, Smith was given the Woman of Distinction Award by the League of Women Voters
- In 2022, Smith received the "but for" Leadership Florida Award which recognizes people who have worked to improve the lives of their fellow Floridians
- In 2022, Smith was named by Time to the Time 100, their annual list of the 100 most influential people in the world
- In 2022, the GLBTQ Legal Advocates & Defenders awarded Smith the Spirit of Justice Award for her work on "national human rights advocate, organizer, and LGBTQ equality champion for over three decades"
- In 2025, Smith received the LGBTQ Humanist Award from the American Humanist Association.

== Quotes ==
- "George W. Bush and Al Gore shouldn't be talking about who's going to blink first. They should be talking about how are we going to restore faith in democracy in the American people, because it's been sorely tested right now."
- "They don't ask, we don't tell and rarely are they required to see with their own eyes the deep harm and real pain inflicted by laws that tell us we are less than our neighbors."
- "When fair-minded Floridians come to understand just how harmful this initiative is to so many Florida families, they will reject this amendment. Laws should not make it harder to take care of the people you love."
- "As a child I was told that Rosa Parks was tired and fed up one fateful day and decided right then and there that she would not give up her seat. I was impressed by her courage. Later, when I learned that her protest had been contemplated at length with the consequences fully measured, I was inspired even more deeply by her willingness to intentionally sacrifice her freedom and safety to make the country confront the ugliness of Jim Crow."
- "We march, we lobby, we educate, we protest and we should and we must. But it seems increasingly clear to me that we must now do what civil rights movements have always done: with forethought and solemnity place ourselves visibly at odds with an unjust law to provoke the consequences that can prick the conscience of our country."
- "Every civil rights struggle in this country has required people to sacrifice and make institutionalized discrimination so visible no one could avert their eyes. People stepped forward knowing they could lose their homes, lose their jobs, their safety. They walked willingly toward hateful mobs and police with snarling dogs. They turned a proposed one day bus boycott into 381 days of solidarity. They sacrificed and the country watched and changed. Every civil rights struggle in this country has required people to sacrifice. The country is watching. Are we ready to do the same?"
