= Tennessee House of Representatives 32nd district =

State legislative district in Tennessee

Tennessee's 32nd State House of Representatives district
- Map of Tennessee House districts with the 32nd District shaded in red
Representative
Monty Fritts; R–Cleveland
since 2023
- Demographics: 88.3% White; 2.2% Black; 5.3% Hispanic; 0.7% Asian; 3.1% Multiracial
- Population (2024): 73,609

The Tennessee House of Representatives 32nd district is one of the 99 legislative districts in the lower house of the Tennessee General Assembly. The district is located in East Tennessee and covers part of Loudon and Roane counties. The district includes Harriman, Lenoir City, Rockwood, Kingston, and the western half of Oak Ridge. Watts Bar Lake stretches across the middle of the district. The rest of the district is unincorporated and mostly rural. Monty Fritts has represented the district since 2023.

== Demographics ==
The Tennessee Comptroller estimates the population as of 2024 at 73,609.

- 88.3% of the district is White
- 5.3% of the district is Hispanic
- 2.2% of the district is Black
- 0.7% of the district is Asian
- 3.1% of the district is Two or more races

Detailed demographic information is also available through Census Reporter.

== History ==
The 88th Tennessee General Assembly was the first in which all districts were numbered. At this time, the 32nd district was in Anderson, Campbell, Roane and Scott counties. From the 89th-91st GAs, it was composed of Anderson, Campbell, Roane and Morgan counties. From the 92nd-93rd GAs, it was composed of Roane and Morgan counties. From the 94th-102nd GAs, it was in Roane County. From the 103rd-107th GAs it was made up of all of Roane and part of Loudon counties. Since the 108th General Assembly, it has been composed of parts of Roane and Loudon counties.

== List of Representatives ==
Representative	Party	Years of Service	General Assembly	Hometown
Jack Stockton	Republican	2026-present		
Monty Fritts	Republican	2023-2026	113th-114th	Kingston
Kent Calfee	Republican	2013-2022	108th-112th	Kingston
Julia Hurley	Republican	2011-2012	107th	Lenoir City
Dennis Ferguson	Democratic	1997-2010	100th-106th	Midtown
Bruce E. Cantrell	Republican	1995-1996	99th	Harriman
Dennis Ferguson	Democratic	1991-1994	97th-98th	Kingston
James M. Henry	Republican	1979-1990	91st-96th	Kingston
F. Chris Cawood	Democratic	1975-1978	89th-90th	Kingston
Jack Bowman	Republican	1967-1974	85th-88th	Harriman
