= Same-sex marriage in Tennessee =

Same-sex marriage has been legal in Tennessee since the U.S. Supreme Court's ruling in Obergefell v. Hodges on June 26, 2015. Governor Bill Haslam quickly announced that the state would abide by the court's decision, and same-sex couples began to marry in Tennessee. Previously, Tennessee had banned same-sex marriage both by statute and its State Constitution.

Polling suggests that a majority of Tennessee residents support the legal recognition of same-sex marriage, with a 2021 survey by the Public Religion Research Institute showing that 54% of residents supported same-sex marriage. Despite this, a number of state politicians and officials continue to oppose it. In 2022, an attempt by a group of Republican lawmakers to curb the legal rights of married same-sex couples would have inadvertently created a loophole allowing child marriages and polygamy in the state. The attempt was widely mocked on social media and opposed by a majority of Democratic and Republican politicians. In 2018, House Republicans blocked a bill to ban child marriages because the Family Action Council of Tennessee, a group which opposes same-sex marriage, feared it could interfere with an anti-same-sex marriage lawsuit it had filed in Bradley County; the bill was passed following outcry, and the lawsuit was later dismissed by a circuit court judge in March 2019.

== Legal history ==
=== Restrictions ===
In 1996, the Tennessee General Assembly enacted a statute banning same-sex marriages. This ban was struck down by the U.S. Supreme Court on June 26, 2015.

On May 6, 2004, the House of Representatives approved Amendment 1, a constitutional amendment banning same-sex marriage, by a vote of 85–5. On May 19, the Senate approved it by a vote of 28–1. The amendment required approval by the General Assembly in the following year's legislative session. On February 28, 2005, the Senate approved it by a vote of 29–3, and on March 17 the House approved it by a vote of 88–7. On November 7, 2006, Tennessee voters approved the amendment by 81.3% to 18.7%.

=== Traditional Marriage Day ===
On March 25, 2013, the Tennessee Senate voted 32–0 in favor of a non-binding resolution making August 31 "Traditional Marriage Day" in Tennessee. On April 18, the Tennessee House of Representatives voted 89–0 in favor of the resolution, and Governor Bill Haslam signed the resolution into law on May 2.

=== State lawsuit ===
In 2014, Frederick Michael Borman, who had married his same-sex spouse, Larry Kevin Pyles-Borman, in August 2010 in Iowa, filed a lawsuit, Borman v. Pyles-Borman, in circuit court in Roane County challenging the state's refusal to grant them a divorce. The plaintiff requested that the state recognize his out-of-state same-sex marriage so that he could file for divorce in Tennessee. He argued that state laws treated legal same-sex marriages as "a special class singled out for disadvantages without any legitimate basis". On August 5, 2014, Judge Russell E. Simmons Jr. ruled in favor of Tennessee inter alia, holding that the state's anti-recognition laws did not single out same-sex marriages validly performed in other states, and therefore, did not violate the Equal Protection and the Full Faith and Credit clauses of the State Constitution. The ruling was overturned on appeal by the Tennessee Court of Appeals in August 2015 citing the U.S. Supreme Court's ruling in Obergefell v. Hodges.

=== Federal lawsuit ===
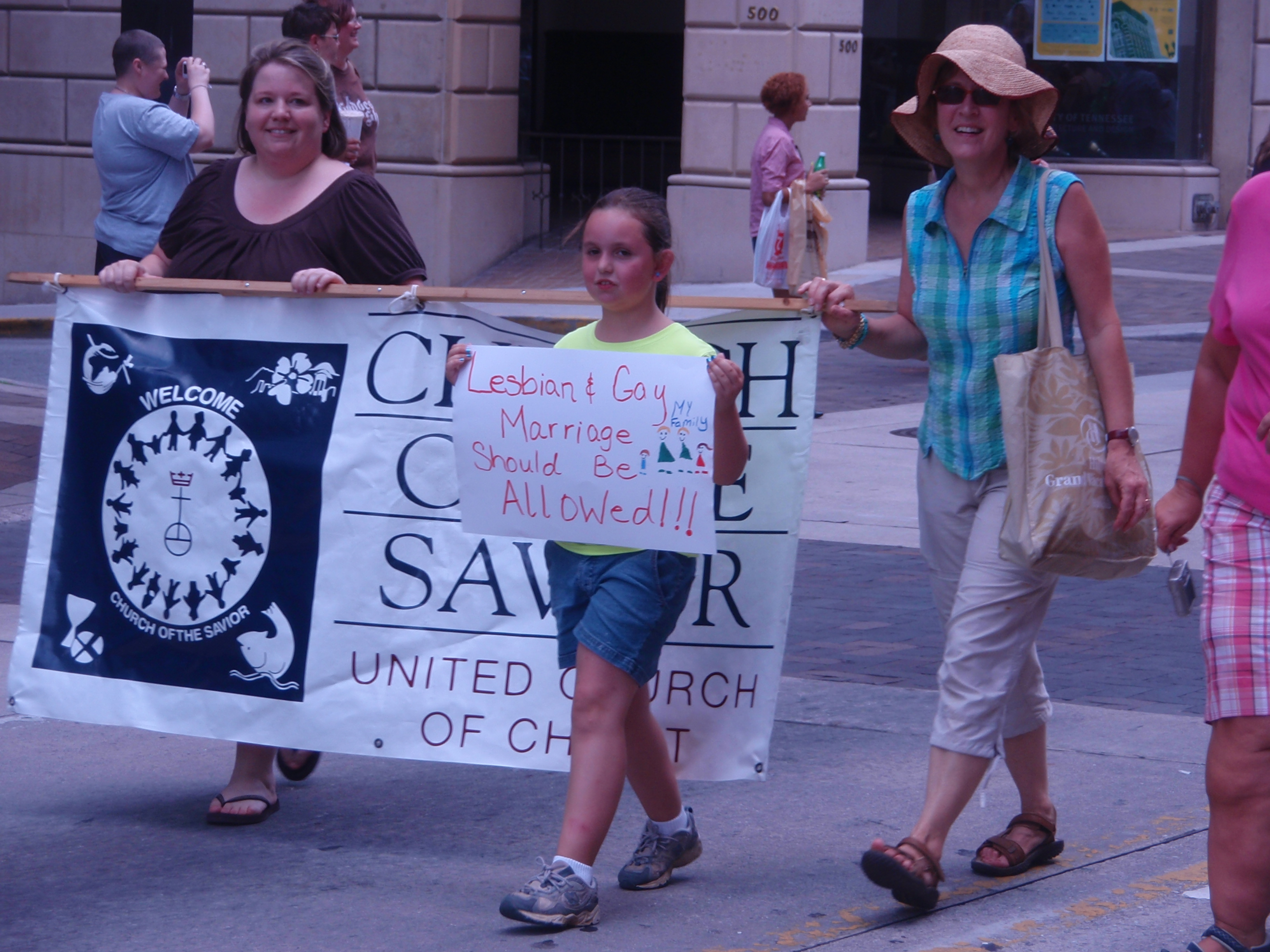
Members of the United Church of Christ campaigning for same-sex marriage in Knoxville, June 2009

On October 21, 2013, the National Center for Lesbian Rights filed a lawsuit in the U.S. District Court for the Middle District of Tennessee on behalf of several same-sex couples in Tennessee. The case, Tanco v. Haslam, sought to require the state to recognize their marriages established in California and New York. On March 14, 2014, U.S. District Judge Aleta Arthur Trauger granted a preliminary injunction requiring the state to recognize the marriages of the plaintiff couples. The state defendants appealed Tanco to the Sixth Circuit Court of Appeals, which granted a stay. A three-judge panel heard oral arguments in the case on August 6, 2014, along with same-sex marriage cases originating from Michigan, Ohio, and Kentucky. The Sixth Circuit ultimately ruled in favor of the states and upheld the bans on November 6, 2014.

Tanco was incorporated into Obergefell v. Hodges and decided along with several other Sixth Circuit court cases related to the legality of state bans on same-sex marriage by the U.S. Supreme Court on June 26, 2015. In a 5–4 ruling, the Supreme Court reversed the Sixth Circuit's judgment and struck down Tennessee's ban. Governor Bill Haslam announced the same day that the state would abide by the court's decision, "We will comply with the decision and will ensure that our departments are able to do so as quickly as possible." The Tennessee Attorney General, Herbert Slatery, issued the following statement: "Today's United States Supreme Court decision not only changes the definition of marriage, but takes from the states and their citizens the longstanding authority to vote and decide what marriage means. To the Tennessee citizen who asks 'Don't we get a chance to vote on this in some way?' the answer from the Supreme Court is a resounding, 'No, you do not.' For the Court to tell all Tennesseans that they have no voice, no right to vote, on these issues is disappointing. The Court, nevertheless, has spoken and we respect its decision. Our office is prepared to work with the Governor and the General Assembly, as needed, to take the necessary steps to implement the decision." Representative Marsha Blackburn said she was "disappointed", and the Lieutenant Governor of Tennessee, Ron Ramsey, said the ruling was an "unfortunate and fundamentally wrong opinion". Representative Jim Cooper from Tennessee's 5th congressional district said, "Love and equality win. I'm glad the Supreme Court ruled on the right side of history." Representative Steve Cohen from Tennessee's 9th congressional district said, "I hope today's Supreme Court ruling can put this issue to rest. [...] As we have seen today, courage and justice always overcome cowardice and prejudice", and the Mayor of Nashville, Karl Dean, said he was "pleased" with the court ruling.

24 same-sex couples were married in Nashville that Friday, June 26, starting with Nikki and Lauren Von Haeger on Friday morning. Bradley Foreman and Chris Brower were the first couple to receive a license in Memphis on June 26. The following counties did not immediately issue marriage licenses to same-sex couples in the wake of the Obergefell ruling: Decatur, Grundy, Marion, Obion and Warren, but all have since begun issuing licenses. By June 30, 2015, all of Tennessee's 95 counties were either issuing marriage licenses to same-sex couples or had announced their willingness to do so. Trauger issued a final injunction in Tanco on August 24, 2015, enjoining the state from enforcing its same-sex marriage bans.

=== Developments after legalization ===
==== Legislative action ====
On January 20, 2016, a House subcommittee voted 1–4 to reject a bill called the Natural Marriage Defense Act which sought to overrule the Supreme Court ruling. Representative Mike Carter had concerns over the legal basis for ignoring the Supreme Court's ruling, labeling it "nullification". Carter was joined by another Republican and two Democrats in rejecting the bill. The Natural Marriage Defense Act was reintroduced to the Tennessee General Assembly on February 8, 2017, with 13 Republican cosponsors. According to legislative analysts, the bill would have cost the state over $9 million if approved. Opponents argued that the bill was unconstitutional and a violation of Obergefell. On March 29, a House subcommittee decided to delay debate on the bill until at least 2018. In January 2018, the bill was withdrawn. It was reintroduced in February 2019, but died without a vote.

In 2022, Representative Tom Leatherwood introduced a bill that would have allowed opposite-sex couples to file marriage "contracts" based on common-law marriage principles, but the contracts would not have been available to same-sex couples. The bill was cosponsored by 18 other Republican lawmakers, and its companion bill in the Senate was introduced by Senator Janice Bowling. Leatherwood said, "So, all this bill does is give an alternative form of marriage for those pastors and other individuals who have a conscientious objection to the current pathway to marriage in our law." Critics argued that it was a "deliberate effort" to circumvent Obergefell and could lead to costly legal battles. Representative Mike Stewart quickly pointed out that the bill did not contain an age limit. Representative Torrey Harris asked Leatherwood to file an amendment explicitly barring minors from the process, which Leatherwood initially chose not to do. News of the omission of an age limit spread fast, and caused fierce backlash from civil society. The bill was widely mocked, and some worried the move helped reinforce stereotypes regarding Tennessee as "backward". The sponsors reacted to the backlash by amended their bill to include an age limit, and Leathwood stated, "Yes, I am opposed to child marriages." Nonetheless, social media posts continued to circulate that the bill would have legalized child marriage in Tennessee. Occupy Democrats wrote on Facebook, "Tennessee Republicans are advancing a 'marry little kids' bill that will allow them to marry children of any age." Representative Johnny Garrett also pointed out that the bill did not prohibit polygamous marriage contracts. Despite being amended by the sponsors, the bill continued to be opposed by several Republican and Democratic politicians. Civil rights attorney Abby Rubenfeld said, "This argument that it is going to set up two separate paths to marriage is blatantly unconstitutional in violation of the Obergefell decision, which is the law of the land." The bill was sent to summer study on April 13, which effectively killed it for that legislative session.

On March 6, 2023, the Tennessee House voted 74–22 in favor of legislation proposed by Representative Monty Fritts to explicitly allow public officials to refuse to solemnize a marriage if they cite their "conscience or religious beliefs". The bill was amended in 2024 to allow officials to refuse to perform marriages without providing any reason for their refusal. Clerks would remain obliged to issue licenses. The legislation passed the Senate, and was signed into law by Governor Bill Lee on February 21, 2024. Critics have noted that this law could be used to discriminate against same-sex, interracial, interfaith and immigrant couples.

In 2025, Representative Gino Bulso and Senator Mark Pody introduced unconstitutional legislation to the General Assembly to create a form of covenant marriage exclusively limited to opposite-sex couples. The proposed Tennessee Covenant Marriage Act would "create covenant marriage, which is entered into by one male and one female, who understand and agree that marriage is a lifelong relationship". The Freedom From Religion Foundation Action Fund stated it was "strongly opposed" to the bill, calling it a "religiously motivated attempt to roll back marriage rules to a time when women were viewed as little more than their husband's property."

In 2026, HB1473 was introduced by Gino Bulso in the House which will allow private individuals and organizations to not recognize same-sex marriages without facing punishment. The bill was passed in the House by 68-24 vote, with votes split along party lines, with 68 Republican members supporting and 24 Democrat members opposing the bill.

==== Court challenges ====
In January 2016, a conservative lawyer filed a lawsuit in Williamson County seeking to stop same-sex marriages in Tennessee. In June 2016, a judge, while declaring his personal opposition to Obergefell, dismissed the lawsuit. The judge ruled that the plaintiff could not show he had been harmed by the Obergefell ruling. The decision was upheld by the Tennessee Court of Appeals in May 2018. The court's opinion stated, "None of the citizen plaintiffs alleged that they were denied a marriage license; instead, they complain of the issuance of marriage license to others."

A similar lawsuit was filed in Bradley County in February 2016. The lawsuit, which was filed by David Fowler, the president of the Family Action Council of Tennessee, on behalf of a local pastor and a county commissioner, sought to prevent the county clerk from issuing marriage licenses to same-sex couples. Fowler accused the Supreme Court of "usurping" the Tennessee General Assembly's right to define marriage, and that because the Assembly had not yet modified its marriage statutes, all marriages performed since Obergefell (whether same-sex or opposite-sex) were invalid. The county clerk requested that the case be dismissed. A hearing on whether to dismiss the lawsuit was held in December 2017. In March 2018, House Republicans killed a proposed bill to ban child marriages due to opposition from the Family Action Council, which feared that the bill could interfere with their lawsuit. The move received considerable media coverage. Representative Darren Jernigan, the bill's main sponsor, said: "Basically, what has happened is the Family Action Council wants to continue to let 13-year-olds get married in the state at the sake of their court case against same-sex couples. It's disgraceful. I'm embarrassed for the State of Tennessee, and I can only pray that we bring this back next year and not let them get in the way." The bill was revived due to political pressure, passed, and signed into law in May 2018 by Governor Haslam, preventing anyone younger than 17 from marrying in Tennessee. Eventually, the case was dismissed by a circuit court judge in March 2019. According to the Cleveland Daily Banner, the lawsuit cost the county between $15,000–70,000.

In June 2019, a video was revealed showing Craig Northcott, district attorney for Coffee County, saying that he intended to prosecute assaults within same-sex marriages as regular assaults, not as domestic assaults (which would be punished more severely). Northcott's reason was rooted in his personal opinion. He said that enhanced charges were introduced "to recognize and protect the sanctity of marriage. And I said there's no marriage to protect [between people of the same sex]. So I don't prosecute them as domestics." The Tennessee Board of Professional Responsibility opened an investigation into Northcott over his comments that same-sex couples were not entitled to protection from domestic violence and that all Muslims are "evil", though dismissed the charges without comment in July 2021.

In December 2019, a group of Christian ministers filed a petition for declaratory judgment asking the Tennessee Department of Health to revert to its pre-Obergefell marriage forms, which excluded same-sex couples. The group, supported by Fowler, alleged that the state was violating the Tennessee Constitution by issuing marriage licenses to same-sex couples. A spokesperson for the National Center for Lesbian Rights said, "This is a political stunt, not a serious legal threat. If Fowler actually followed through on filing a lawsuit, it would be thrown out. Marriage equality is the law of the land, including in Tennessee."

==== Resolutions of support or opposition ====
In September 2015, Greene County passed a resolution expressing opposition to same-sex marriage. Similar resolutions were subsequently approved in Carter, Dickson, Hawkins, Johnson, McMinn, Morgan, Sullivan and Unicoi counties. Hamblen and Washington counties rejected such resolutions, and Davidson County approved a resolution in February 2016 expressing support for same-sex marriage and asking state lawmakers to reject anti-LGBT bills.

On March 3, 2016, the House of Representatives passed a resolution, in a 73–18 vote, expressing opposition to Obergefell.

== Demographics and marriage statistics ==
Data from the 2000 U.S. census showed that 10,189 same-sex couples were living in Tennessee. By 2005, this had increased to 13,570 couples, likely attributed to same-sex couples' growing willingness to disclose their partnerships on government surveys. Same-sex couples lived in all counties of the state and constituted 0.8% of coupled households and 0.5% of all households in the state. Most couples lived in Shelby, Davidson and Knox counties. Same-sex partners in Tennessee were on average younger than opposite-sex partners, and more likely to be employed. However, the average household income of same-sex couples was lower than different-sex couples, and same-sex couples were also far less likely to own a home than opposite-sex partners. 16% of same-sex couples in Tennessee were raising children under the age of 18, with an estimated 4,233 children living in households headed by same-sex couples in 2005.

From June 2015 to early February 2016, 101 marriage licenses were issued to same-sex couples in Hamilton County, accounting for about 7% of all licenses issued in the county during that time. Neighboring counties including Bradley and Rhea issued 12 and 3 marriage licenses to same-sex couples, respectively.

2018 estimates from the United States Census Bureau showed that there were about 18,000 same-sex households in Tennessee. The bureau estimated that 52% of same-sex couples in the state were married. The 2020 U.S. census showed that there were 10,841 married same-sex couple households (4,485 male couples and 6,356 female couples) and 9,932 unmarried same-sex couple households in Tennessee.

== Domestic partnerships ==
Certain jurisdictions in Tennessee provide for the creation of private domestic partnership contracts. Governor Bill Haslam and House Majority Leader Gerald McCormick both said in 2013 there was "no huge demand" for domestic partnerships in Tennessee.

In August 2013, the City Commission of Collegedale voted 4–1 in favor of granting domestic partnership benefits to same-sex couples. The ordinance went into effect on January 1, 2014. In October 2013, Mayor Madeline Rogero of Knoxville announced the creation of a domestic partnership program for the city, which went into effect on January 1, 2014. On November 12, 2013, the City Council of Chattanooga voted 5–4 in favor of granting domestic partnership benefits to same-sex couples. On November 19, 2013, the Council approved the ordinance in a final vote of 5–3. Before the domestic partnership ordinance went into effect, the Citizens for Government Accountability and Transparency, a local segment of the Tea Party, gathered enough signatures to put a repeal of the ordinance to a popular vote in August 2014. The Council did not repeal the ordinance on its own, allowing the vote to proceed on August 7, the general election date for Hamilton County. A December 2013 Multi-Quest poll found that 53% Chattanooga registers voters opposed the city ordinance allowing domestic partnerships and adding sexual orientation, gender identity and gender expression to the city's non-discrimination policy, while 37% supported. On August 7, 2014, Chattanooga voters repealed the ordinance by a vote of 62.58% in favor and 37.42% against.

On June 17, 2014, the Metropolitan Council of Nashville and Davidson County voted 27–7 in favor of granting domestic partnership benefits to same-sex couples in Nashville and Davidson County. Mayor Karl Dean signed the ordinance into law on June 25, 2014.

== Public opinion ==
Public opinion for same-sex marriage in Tennessee
Poll source	Dates administered	Sample size	Margin of error	Support	Opposition	Do not know / refused
Public Religion Research Institute	March 9 – December 7, 2023	395 adults	?	55%	41%	4%
Public Religion Research Institute	March 11 – December 14, 2022	?	?	52%	46%	4%
Public Religion Research Institute	March 8 – November 9, 2021	?	?	54%	42%	4%
Public Religion Research Institute	January 7 – December 20, 2020	1,005 adults	?	65%	28%	7%
Public Religion Research Institute	April 5 – December 23, 2017	1,480 adults	?	46%	45%	9%
Public Religion Research Institute	May 18, 2016 – January 10, 2017	2,139 adults	?	46%	43%	11%
Vanderbilt University	November 14–29, 2016	1,005 registered voters	± 3.5%	32%	45%	23%
Public Religion Research Institute	April 29, 2015 – January 7, 2016	1,895 adults	?	37%	56%	7%
Middle Tennessee State University	October 25–27, 2015	603 registered voters	± 4.0%	29%	57%	14%
Middle Tennessee State University	January 25–27, 2015	600 adults	?	32%	55%	13%
Public Religion Research Institute	April 2, 2014 – January 4, 2015	1,200 adults	?	39%	55%	6%
Middle Tennessee State University	January 23–26, 2014	600 adults	± 4.0%	26%	64%	10%
Middle Tennessee State University	February 11–19, 2013	650 adults	?	28%	62%	10%
Middle Tennessee State University	October 16–21, 2012	609 registered voters	± 4.0%	24%	61%	15%
Vanderbilt University	January 2011	?	?	27%	69%	4%

A Vanderbilt University poll conducted in May 2013 showed that 32% of Tennessee voters supported same-sex marriage, 17% supported civil unions but not marriage, and 46% were opposed to either type of legal recognition. Voters under the age of 30 were overwhelmingly more likely to support one of these types of legal recognition. When the same survey asked about domestic partner benefits, 62% expressed support and 31% said were opposed.

== See also ==
- LGBT rights in Tennessee
- Tennessee Equality Project
- Tennessee Transgender Political Coalition
- Same-sex marriage in the United States
- Status of same-sex marriage
- Timeline of same-sex marriage
