= Julia Hurley =

Julia Hurley may refer to:

- Julia Hurley (politician) (born 1981), American politician and businesswoman from Tennessee
- Julia Hurley (actress) (1848-1927), American actress
