= DeBoer v. Snyder =

2012 US Supreme Court case

- Supreme Court of the United States

Argued April 28, 2015
- Full case name: April DeBoer, individually and as parent and next friend of N.D.-R, R.D.-R., and J.D.-R, minors, and Jayne Rowse, individually and as parent and next friend of N.D.-R, R.D.-R., and J.D.-R, minors, Plaintiffs-Petitioners v. Richard Snyder, in his official capacity as Governor of the State of Michigan, Bill Schuette, in his official capacity as Michigan Attorney General, and Lisa Brown in her official capacity as Oakland County Clerk, Defendants-Respondents
- Related cases: Bourke v. Beshear, Obergefell v. Hodges, Tanco v. Haslam, Love v. Beshear.

Case history
- Prior: DeBoer v. Snyder, 973 F. Supp. 2d 757 (E.D. Mich. 2014); reversed, 772 F.3d 388 (6th Cir. 2014); cert. granted, 135 S. Ct. 1040 (2015).

Court membership
- Chief Justice John Roberts Associate Justices Antonin Scalia · Anthony Kennedy; Clarence Thomas · Ruth Bader Ginsburg; Stephen Breyer · Samuel Alito; Sonia Sotomayor · Elena Kagan

Laws applied
- U.S. Const. amend. XIV

DeBoer v. Snyder is a lawsuit that was filed by April DeBoer and Jayne Rowse on January 23, 2012, in the United States District Court for the Eastern District of Michigan, challenging Michigan's ban on adoption by same-sex couples so they can jointly adopt their children. In August 2012, Judge Bernard A. Friedman invited the couple to amend their suit to challenge the state's ban on same-sex marriage, "the underlying issue". Following a hearing on October 16, 2013, Friedman scheduled a trial that ran from February 25 to March 7, 2014. On March 21, Judge Friedman issued his ruling overturning the ban. On March 22, the United States Court of Appeals for the Sixth Circuit placed a temporary hold on Judge Friedman's ruling. The appeal was argued on August 6. On November 6, the Sixth Circuit reversed Judge Friedman and upheld Michigan's ban on same-sex marriage.

The decision was appealed to the U.S. Supreme Court, which, on January 16, 2015, consolidated this case with three others and agreed to review the case. Oral arguments were heard on April 28, 2015, and the Supreme Court struck down the state's same-sex marriage ban on June 26, 2015.

== Background ==
On January 23, 2012, a lesbian couple filed a lawsuit in U.S. District Court for the Eastern District of Michigan on behalf of themselves and three children, challenging the state's ban on adoption by same-sex couples so they can jointly adopt their children. The women are April DeBoer and Jayne Rowse, both nurses. One has an adopted son and the other two adopted daughters, all with special needs. At the time of filing, Michigan law restricted second-parent adoption to married couples and did not license or recognize same-sex marriages.

In August 2012, Judge Bernard A. Friedman invited the couple to amend their suit to challenge the state's ban on same-sex marriage, "the underlying issue". They did so on September 7, 2012. To the original defendants, the governor and attorney-general of Michigan, they added the Oakland County Clerk.

The plaintiffs were originally represented by three private attorneys, Dana Nessel, Carole Stanyar and Kenneth M. Mogill, along with Wayne State University Distinguished Professor of Law Robert A. Sedler, an experienced litigator in civil rights cases. In January 2014, attorneys from the American Civil Liberties Union and Gay & Lesbian Advocates & Defenders joined them.

== Hearing and trial ==
On March 7, 2013, after hearing arguments in the case, Friedman announced that he would delay ruling pending the outcome of two same-sex marriage cases before the Supreme Court of the United States, United States v. Windsor and Hollingsworth v. Perry. National LGBT advocacy groups had recommended the delay. On July 1, citing the recent Supreme Court decision in United States v. Windsor, he denied the state officials' motion to dismiss the suit. Friedman heard arguments on motions in the case on October 16, 2013, and said he was unable to rule on the basis of the arguments. He said: "I'm in the middle. I have to decide this as a matter of law. I intend to do so." An attorney for one of the defendants, Oakland County Clerk Lisa Brown, said she was eager to issue marriage licenses to same-sex couples as soon as the law allowed her to do so. At the end of that hearing, Friedman scheduled the trial for February 25, 2014. On a motion by the plaintiffs, and over the objections of the defense, Friedman agreed on January 3, 2014, to divide the trial in two, reserving for a second phase, if needed, all discussion of the level of scrutiny appropriate to Michigan's denial of adoption and marriage rights to same-sex couples.

=== Witnesses for the plaintiffs ===
The plaintiffs called witnesses from February 25, 2014, to February 28, 2014.

Dr. David Brodzinsky
A psychologist in the San Francisco Bay Area whose research and scholarly writings have focused on psychological issues in gay and lesbian parenting and adoption, adoption and foster care, stress and coping in children, non-traditional family life, child custody issues, and children's cognitive development. He was a founding director of the Evan B. Donaldson Adoption Institute in New York and currently serves as the Research Director of the Institute's West Coast Office. He has testified in a number of previous cases, including the Baby M contested adoption case in New Jersey, the Baby Jessica case, the Woody Allen and Mia Farrow contested adoption and custody case in New York, and Baehr v. Miike. Brodzinsky testified on February 25, 2014 that there are no "discernible differences" in children who are raised by same-sex couples and youth raised by heterosexuals. Under cross-examination by Michigan Assistant Attorney General Joseph Potchen, Brodzinsky acknowledged that studies on the stability of same-sex couples were mixed, with some showing a higher breakup rate among same-sex couples.

Dr. Nancy Cott
A professor of American history at Harvard University specializing in the history of gender and sexuality has researched gender roles and marriage trends for decades. Dr. Cott has testified for the plaintiffs in both United States v. Windsor and Hollingsworth v. Perry. Cott offered several examples of discriminatory practices involving marriages over the years which are no longer accepted, among them interracial marriages once being banned, American women who married foreigners once lost their citizenship and property, and the U.S. government at times not acknowledging Native American and Japanese marriages. Cott testified on February 28, 2014 that “The trend is moving toward same-sex gender neutrality/gender equality marriages; and the trend is moving toward same-sex marriages.” She also testified that “The Michigan Marriage Amendment obstructs that trend from continuing.” In explaining how marriage has evolved, Cott cited the 300-year ban on interracial marriage, which was overturned by the U.S. Supreme Court in Loving v. Virginia in 1967. Cott said marriage is a “civil contract” that only be legally sanctioned by legislatures and the courts. In addressing religious objections to same-sex marriage, she said religious authorities have no legal standing over marriages even though they are allowed to conduct marriage ceremonies. Cott testified that there have been no laws in U.S. history that made procreation a requirement for marriage, an argument used by opponents of same-sex marriage. Under cross-examination by state attorney Michelle Brya, Cott admitted the state of Michigan does have an interest in marriage between a man and a woman for population purposes and sometimes economic reasons but did not believe those two issues should stand in the way of same-sex couples legally marrying.

Dr. Gary Gates
Serves as the Williams Distinguished Scholar at the Williams Institute at the UCLA School of Law. His doctoral dissertation included the first significant research study using United States Census data to explore characteristics of same-sex couples. Dr. Gates has been an expert witness in several cases involving LGBT issues. He wrote a brief in support of the plaintiffs in the United States v. Windsor. He has also testified before the United States House Committee on Armed Services on repealing "Don't ask, don't tell" and before the United States Senate on LGBT inclusion in federal immigration law reforms. Gates testified on February 27, 2014 that 8.3 million people in the United States identify themselves as LGBT, including 287,000 Michigan residents whose numbers are growing, particularly among individuals under the age of 30 years. He also cited surveys which found 43% of Americans “see nothing wrong” with same-sex relationships compared to 13% in 1990.

Dr. Michael Rosenfeld
An associate professor of sociology at Stanford University and a social demographer who studies race, ethnicity, and family structure, the family's effect on children, and the history of the family. Dr. Rosenfeld has examined the study by defense witness Regnerus. Some of the work by defense witness Allen is based on Rosenfeld's work which was based on the United States Census. Rosenfeld testified on February 26, 2014 that "there is no basis" for believing that kids develop better in a household led by a man and a woman. Broadly summarizing research in the field, he said "it’s clear that being raised by same-sex parents is no disadvantage to children." While cross-examining Rosenfeld, Assistant Attorney General Kristin Heyse suggested it was rational for voters to approve the same-sex marriage ban nearly 10 years ago because same-sex marriage in the U.S. was just emerging. Rosenfeld’s method of research was questioned by Heyse regarding the sample size used.

Dr. Vivek Sankaran
A clinical professor of law at the University of Michigan in the Child Advocacy Law Clinic, and Director of the Detroit Center for Family Advocacy. Dr. Sankaran has litigated numerous cases before the Michigan Supreme Court on behalf of parents. He also was appointed by Governor Rick Snyder to the Child Abuse Prevention Board. Sankaran testified on February 26, 2014 that more children would be adopted if same-sex couples had the same joint-adoption rights as married heterosexual couples. He noted that nearly 14,000 children in Michigan’s foster care system need homes, saying that allowing joint adoption by same-sex couples would expand the pool of potential parents for those children, which includes about 3,500 orphans. Sankaran added that if one of them adopts a child as a single person, which the state allows, the other has no legal rights to custody of the child if the other parent dies or is incapacitated.

Dr. George Chauncey, who as a professor of history and American studies at Yale University and co-director of the Yale Research Initiative on the History of Sexualities had previously testified in the LGBT case Hollingsworth v. Perry, was expected to testify but had to cancel. He submitted written testimony.

=== Witnesses for the defense ===
The defense called witnesses from March 3, 2014, to March 6, 2014.

Douglas W. Allen
An economist at Simon Fraser University in Vancouver, British Columbia who makes ties between same-sex parenting and childhood instability by looking at couples from unstable homes and comparing them to those who have been raised consistently by two heterosexual parents. Allen takes a 2010 study by Michael Rosenfeld - who testified for the plaintiffs, and re-examines it by adding in the outliers. "We re-examine Rosenfeld's (2010) study on the association between child outcomes and same-sex family structure. Using the same data set, we replicate and generalize Rosenfeld's findings and show that the implications of his study are different when using either alternative comparison groups or alternative sample restrictions. Compared with traditional married households, we find that children being raised by same-sex couples are 35 percent less likely to make normal progress through school; this difference is statistically significant at the one percent level," states the brief for Allen's report. Signed onto an amicus brief with both Price and Regnerus urging the Supreme Court to uphold California’s Proposition 8. Allen was the defense's final witness and testified on March 6, 2014 that the state "should be very cautious in making such a fundamental change to such a fundamental institution when there really isn’t any evidence on the child outcomes." Allen argued that although U.S. psychology and sociology organizations have expressed consensus opinions that children of same-sex couples suffer no measurable disadvantages, conflicting results and limited data show that there's no such certainty on the matter. While maintaining he has no bias, he admitted that his religious views lead him to believe that homosexual acts are grounds for being sent to Hell.

Lisa Brown
A Democrat who was elected Oakland County Clerk & Register of Deeds, a defendant in the case, on November 6, 2012. Brown was previously a member of the Michigan House of Representatives. Brown represented the 39th State House District, located in Central Oakland County since 2009. Although a defendant, Brown testified on March 3, 2014 in favor of same-sex marriage and said her office is ready to issue same-sex marriage licenses.

Sherif Girgis
Author of a book What is Marriage? Man and Woman: A defense and a Ph.D. candidate in philosophy at Princeton University and a law student at Yale University. When Girgis was called to testify on March 3, 2014, Friedman ruled he was not an expert and not qualified to testify.

Loren Marks
Works for the Louisiana State University School of Social Work, and whose research focuses primarily on the role of faith in families. He is known for his criticism of the many studies that look at same gender parenting. He suggests that the American Psychological Association is wrong for citing studies with less than 100 participants. Marks pre-released his study in order for it to be included in Hollingsworth v. Perry, and though he was scheduled to testify in favor of California's Proposition 8, he was not called. Marks testified on March 5, 2014 and criticized a 2005 American Psychological Association study that found there was no difference in the outcomes of children raised by gay and lesbian parents. He said the studies the APA used to frame its report did not include enough heterosexual couples and there were too few gay fathers represented. Under cross-examination by attorney Carole Stanyar, the co-counsel for the DeBoer-Rowse family, Marks admitted that finding a large enough sample to study gay and lesbian parents is like trying to find a "needle in a haystack." Marks also testified under cross-examination that he is "not in favor of redefining marriage at present" but “neutral” on whether there is a difference in outcomes for children raised by gay couples.

Joseph Price
Economics professor from Brigham Young University who worked with Allen. Price also did his own study on the number of people who are gay or bisexual. This was his first study on same-sex parenting. Previous research involved healthy eating, the National Basketball Association, pornography and marriage and media impact on families, among other projects. Price signed onto an amicus brief with both Allen and Regnerus urging the Supreme Court to uphold California’s Proposition 8. Price testified on March 4, 2014 about his 2012 study that reached a different conclusion than Rosenfeld using the same data set. He said his study concluded that children raised in a home with a married father and mother have 35 percent greater odds of "making normal progress in school" than children of same-sex parents.

Mark Regnerus
An associate professor of sociology at the University of Texas at Austin (UT-Austin) who conducted research called "New Family Structures Study" that looked at children in stable, long-term two parent homes compared to those in less-stable homes. An internal audit by the journal that published Regnerus’ study found his conclusions to be flawed and the American Sociological Association have condemned its results. Regnerus himself has admitted that the study doesn’t address same-sex parenting. Signed onto an amicus brief with both Allen and Price urging the Supreme Court to uphold California’s Proposition 8. Regnerus testified on March 3, 2014 that it is too early for social scientists to make far-reaching conclusions about families headed by same-sex couples. "We aren't anywhere near saying there's conclusive evidence" that children with same-sex parents grow up with no differences when compared to kids with heterosexual parents, he said. "Until we get more evidence, we should be skeptical. ...It's prudent for the state to retain its definition of marriage to one man, one woman," testified Regnerus. Christine L. Williams, chair of the sociology department at the UT-Austin, released a statement following Regnerus' testimony stating that his views "do not reflect the views of the Sociology Department of The University of Texas at Austin. Nor do they reflect the views of the American Sociological Association, which takes the position that the conclusions he draws from his study of gay parenting are fundamentally flawed on conceptual and methodological grounds and that findings from Dr. Regnerus' work have been cited inappropriately in efforts to diminish the civil rights and legitimacy of LBGTQ partners and their families. We encourage society as a whole to evaluate his claims." The university's College of Liberal Arts had also distanced itself from Regnerus' views.

=== Conclusion ===
The nine-day trial concluded on March 7 after Kenneth M. Mogill provided the plaintiffs' summation and Kristin Heyse, an assistant attorney general, spoke for the defense. Attorney Michael Pitt spoke separately for defendant Brown, the county clerk, and joined the defense in urging Friedman, should he rule for the plaintiffs, to stay his ruling pending appeal. Judge Friedman said he hoped to rule within two weeks.

== Decision ==
On March 21, after 5 p.m. EDT, Judge Friedman ruled for the plaintiffs without staying enforcement of his decision. In ruling that the Michigan Marriage Amendment violated equal protection, Friedman found it unnecessary to address the Due Process Clause or levels of scrutiny higher than rational review. The state defendants asserted that the same-sex marriage ban furthered legitimate state interests in providing an optimal environment for child rearing, proceeding with caution before altering the traditional definition of marriage, and upholding tradition and morality. Friedman wrote that the first interest could logically be used to "require that only rich, educated, suburban-dwelling, married Asians may marry, to the exclusion of all other heterosexual couples." He wrote that an interest in proceeding with caution can be asserted in any setting and that "any deprivation of constitutional rights calls for prompt rectification".

Regarding morality, Friedman wrote:

Many Michigan residents have religious convictions whose principles ... inform their own viewpoints about marriage. Nonetheless, these views cannot strip other citizens of the guarantees of equal protection under the law. The same Constitution that protects the free exercise of one’s faith in deciding whether to solemnize certain marriages rather than others, is the same Constitution that prevents the state from either mandating adherence to an established religion ... or enforcing private moral or religious beliefs without an accompanying secular purpose.

The state defendants cited Windsor v. United States to maintain that states still hold exclusive power to define marriage. Friedman wrote that Windsor "noted that this power ... must respect the constitutional rights of persons," citing Loving v. Virginia. He wrote that Windsor and Loving "stand for the proposition that, without some overriding legitimate interest, the state cannot use its domestic relations authority to legislate families out of existence."

At the time the ruling was handed down, most county clerks offices in the state had closed. Michigan Attorney General Schuette announced he was filing an emergency request for a stay of the decision pending appeal. Marriages for same-sex couples began the following morning.

== Stay and appeal ==
DeBoer v. Snyder was appealed to the U.S Court of Appeals for the 6th Circuit on March 21, 2014. The next day, after 323 marriage licenses had been issued in four Michigan counties, the appellate court placed a temporary hold on the district court's order allowing same-sex marriage through March 26. After hearing arguments on March 25, an appellate court panel voted 2–1 to approve the state attorney general's motion to extend the stay indefinitely until appeals have concluded. The court also decided to expedite the appeal. A three-judge panel of the Sixth Circuit heard the appeal on August 6 along with similar cases from Kentucky (Bourke v. Beshear and Love v. Beshear), Ohio (Henry v. Himes and Obergefell v. Himes), and Tennessee (Tanco v. Haslam).

== Court of Appeals decision ==
On November 6, 2014, the Sixth Circuit ruled 2–1 that Michigan's ban on same-sex marriage does not violate the constitution. It said it was bound by the U.S. Supreme Court's 1972 action in a similar case, Baker v. Nelson, which dismissed a same-sex couple's marriage claim "for want of a substantial federal question".

The majority ruling said the case was about "change" and "how best to handle it under the Constitution". It noted that the question seemed to be not if, but when and how, this would happen for same-sex marriage. The ruling concluded that Baker had not yet been explicitly overturned and until addressed by the Supreme Court in some future case, there were no legal grounds at present to allow it to be ignored or deemed redundant, since the court could not attempt to anticipate what the changing position of society or the Supreme Court might be in future. Quoting Tully v. Griffin Inc and Hicks, the court noted that it was also not for them to engage in new "doctrinal development" without a basis in new guidance from the Supreme Court. Nor could the court draw conclusions that contradict precedents in previous rulings on the matter.

The ruling noted that the rejection of some past appeals by the Supreme Court were not necessarily a sign that the appeal was ill-founded, and such meaning should not be read into them ("this kind of action - or inaction - imports no expression upon the merits of the case, as the bar has been told many times"). The ruling examined various dubious bases often allowed by States for marriage, and the extent of sanctimonious expressions used in discussing and practicing marriage, and the deference owed to individual states' legislative power to examine such questions at their own pace, and the fact that just one year had passed from the first legalization of same-sex marriage in the United States to the matters leading to this case. It concluded that "what we are left with, is [that] by creating a status (marriage) and subsidizing it (with privileges) the States created an incentive for two people who procreate together to stay together for the purposes of rearing offspring". The court also described the Supreme Court's 2013 ruling in Windsor as one that should be seen less as an affirmation of same-sex marriage, and instead, as a case concerning Federal law encroachment upon State law, in which it had been confirmed that it was not the place of the Federal legislation to effectively seek to determine for all States how they should each treat same-sex marriage. Writing for the majority, Judge Jeffrey Sutton also dismissed the arguments made on behalf of same-sex couples in this case: "Not one of the plaintiffs' theories, however, makes the case for constitutionalizing the definition of marriage and for removing the issue from the place it has been since the founding: in the hands of state voters."

=== Dissenting opinion ===
Dissenting, Judge Martha Craig Daughtrey wrote: "Because the correct result is so obvious, one is tempted to speculate that the majority has purposefully taken the contrary position to create the circuit split regarding the legality of same-sex marriage that could prompt a grant of certiorari by the Supreme Court and an end to the uncertainty of status and the interstate chaos that the current discrepancy in state laws threatens."

== U.S. Supreme Court ==
The same-sex couples filed a petition for certiorari with the U.S. Supreme Court on November 17. They presented a single question for the court's consideration: "Whether a state violates the Fourteenth Amendment to the U.S. Constitution by denying same-sex couples the right to marry." On November 24, Attorney General Schuette filed a brief with the Supreme Court supporting the same-sex couples' petition for certiorari.

On January 16, 2015, the Supreme Court consolidated this case as Obergefell v. Hodges, 576 U.S. ___ (2015), with three other same-sex marriage cases – Tanco v. Haslam (Tennessee), Obergefell v. Hodges (Ohio), and Bourke v. Beshear (Kentucky) – challenging state laws that prohibited same-sex marriage and agreed to review the case. It set a briefing schedule to be completed April 17 and scheduled oral argument for April 28, 2015. The court asked the parties to address two questions: "1) Does the Fourteenth Amendment require a state to license a marriage between two people of the same sex? 2) Does the Fourteenth Amendment require a state to recognize a marriage between two people of the same sex when their marriage was lawfully licensed and performed out-of-state?"

The United States Supreme Court had heard oral arguments on April 28, 2015.

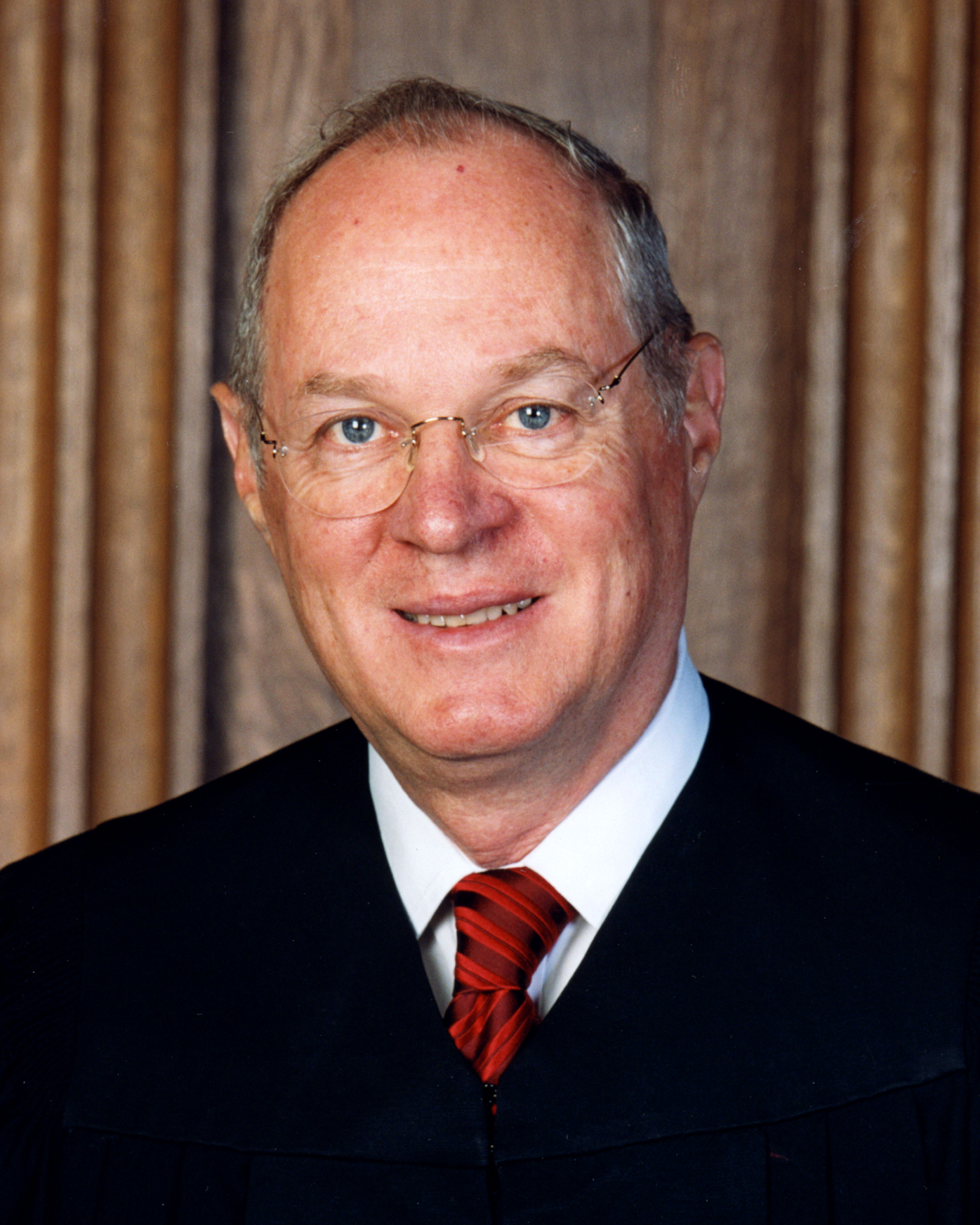
Justice Anthony Kennedy, the author of the Court's opinion.

On June 26, 2015, the U.S. Supreme Court held in a 5–4 decision that the Fourteenth Amendment requires all states to grant same-sex marriages and recognize same-sex marriages granted in other states. The Court overturned its prior decision in Baker v. Nelson, which the Sixth Circuit had invoked as precedent.

The Obergefell v. Hodges decision came on the second anniversary of the United States v. Windsor ruling that struck down Section 3 of the Defense of Marriage Act (DOMA), which denied federal recognition of same-sex marriages. It also came on the twelfth anniversary of Lawrence v. Texas which struck down sodomy laws in 13 states. Each justice's opinion on Obergefell was consistent with their opinion in Windsor. In both cases, Justice Kennedy authored the majority opinion and was considered the "swing vote".

== See also ==
- Accidental Activists
- LGBT rights in Michigan
- Same-sex marriage in Michigan
