= Accidental Activists =

2016 American documentary film directed by Mandi Wright

- Film poster
- Directed by: Mandi Wright
- Written by: Kathy Kieliszewski
- Produced by: Kathy Kieliszewski
- Starring: April DeBoer; Jayne Rowse; Dana Nessel; Carole Stanyar
- Production company: Detroit Free Press
- Release date: April 2, 2016
- Running time: 77 minutes
- Country: United States
- Language: English

Accidental Activists is a 2016 American documentary film directed by Mandi Wright. It was written and produced by Kathy Kieliszewski, in conjunction with the Detroit Free Press. The film follows April DeBoer and her partner Jayne Rowse, who went to court and challenged the state of Michigan's adoption law. When the judge told them they would lose their case, he suggested they instead challenge the state's same-sex marriage ban. They consider themselves "accidental activists," meaning they filed lawsuits not to further a cause, but because of the way the bans affected their lives. The documentary premiered on April 2, 2016, at the Freep Film Festival, and went on to screen at several other film fests around the country. It was later shown on Detroit Public TV.

== Premise ==
Mandi Wright followed and documented the five-year journey of Jayne Rowse and April DeBoer, who initially were looking to overturn Michigan's law that kept them from joint custody of their adopted children. But when a federal judge recommended they challenge the state's same-sex marriage ban instead, the partner's lawyers amended their lawsuit and argued against Michigan's constitutional amendment that prevented them from marrying and from joint custody of their children. The couple's case eventually joined the federal lawsuit that went to the U.S. Supreme Court in the historic case that brought marriage equality to the entire country.

== Cast ==
- April DeBoer
- Jayne Rowseas
- Carole Stanyar (lawyer who argued their case)
- Dana Nessel (lawyer who argued their case, now Michigan Attorney General, and the first openly gay person elected to that position)

== Background and history ==
Before any lawsuits are filed, DeBoer and Rowse, both nurses, are living together as a couple, and have four adopted children. DeBoer adopted two of the children and Rowse the other two, because Michigan wouldn't allow joint adoption due to their status as a same-sex couple, but single people were allowed to adopt. When a truck traveling in the wrong lane nearly hit their car head-on, it was a wake-up call for the couple. They realized there was very little they could do to make sure the other one would get custody of the children of the other partner, if one of them unexpectedly died. In order to prevent this scenario from happening, the couple started looking for ways to protect their children. They started putting wills and trusts in place, but those documents basically had no legal status, because it would be within a judge's discretion to award that child to someone else.

In 2011, Mandi Wright, a photojournalist for the Detroit Free Press, heard about their plight, and started documenting it. In 2012, DeBoer and Rowse announced at a news conference they were filing a federal lawsuit against the state; Wright and another reporter accompanying her from the newspaper, were the only media there. The couple filed their lawsuit in January 2012 in federal court, but U.S. District Judge Bernard Friedman suggested they take a different route. He told them to instead challenge Michigan's same-sex marriage ban, which voters had approved in 2004, so they took Friedman's advice. Friedman then ordered a trial on the issue, arguing that a trial "was in order on such a decisive issue". At the conclusion of the trial, the judge ruled in the couple's favor, stating Michigan's ban on same-sex marriage was unconstitutional.

The state then appealed, and the case went before the U.S. Sixth Circuit Court of Appeals, which had jurisdiction over same-sex marriage cases from four states: Michigan, Ohio Kentucky and Tennessee. The appeals court ruled against all the plaintiffs, saying that the "issue of same-sex marriage should be left up to voters to decide, not judges". DeBoer and Rowse's lawyers then joined the federal lawsuit that was going before the U.S. Supreme Court. The result of that case ushered in a new era for LGBT rights by bringing marriage equality to the entire country. On August 22, 2015, the couple was married by Judge Friedman.

Honestly, I never thought I'd see the day where gay people could get legally married all across the U.S.

— Mandi Wright

Wright said she knew from the beginning this was going to be a good story. She recalled telling herself, "this is mine ... nobody else's ... I promised myself, I wasn't going to let this one go. I knew everybody was in it for the long fight." She also said the story affected her personally, as she came out in the 1980s, and had been fighting this battle a long time. So she decided to do what she does best, "tell a story visually." After watching the documentary about themselves, April Deboer-Rowse said "I know that someday when my kids are old enough to understand what we've done, that they can see it, and see why we did it, and what we did."

== Reviews ==
A review in Workers World was very blunt is stating that the film "reminds us of the serious harm done to countless real families by so-called defenders of 'traditional marriage' ... and now these bigots ... think they can get away with blatant discrimination through anti-LGBTQ laws justified on the basis of hateful 'sincerely held religious beliefs'." The National Press Photographers Association said the movie is "both polished and gritty and mostly a mixture of digital single-lens reflex camera and iPhone stills and video footage. It shows what still photographers can do when they have a solid story and the support of an editor who encourages strong visual storytelling".

== See also ==
- LGBT parenting
- LGBT rights in the United States
- Obergefell v. Hodges
- Societal attitudes toward homosexuality
