= Bourke v. Beshear =

- Supreme Court of the United States

Argued April 28, 2015
- Full case name: Gregory Bourke, et al., Petitioners v. Steve Beshear, Governor of Kentucky
- Related cases: Obergefell v. Hodges, DeBoer v. Snyder, Tanco v. Haslam.

Case history
- Prior: Bourke v. Beshear, 996 F. Supp. 2d 542 (W.D. Ky. 2014); Love v. Beshear, 989 F. Supp. 2d 536 (W.D. Ky. 2014); reversed sub. nom., DeBoer v. Snyder, 772 F.3d 388 (6th Cir. 2014); cert. granted, 135 S. Ct. 1041 (2015).

Court membership
- Chief Justice John Roberts Associate Justices Antonin Scalia · Anthony Kennedy; Clarence Thomas · Ruth Bader Ginsburg; Stephen Breyer · Samuel Alito; Sonia Sotomayor · Elena Kagan

Laws applied
- U.S. Const. amend. XIV

The lead cases on same-sex marriage in Kentucky are Bourke v. Beshear, and its companion case Love v. Beshear. In Bourke, a U.S. district court found that the Equal Protection Clause requires Kentucky to recognize valid same-sex marriages from other jurisdictions. In Love, the same court found that this same clause renders Kentucky's ban on same-sex marriage unconstitutional. Both decisions were stayed and consolidated upon appeal to the Sixth Circuit Court of Appeals, which heard oral arguments in both cases on August 6, 2014. On November 6, the Sixth Circuit upheld Kentucky's ban on same-sex marriage.

On January 16, 2015, the U.S. Supreme Court consolidated these cases with three others and agreed to review the case under the name Obergefell v. Hodges. Oral arguments were heard on April 28, 2015, and the Court ruled in favor of the plaintiffs in June 2015.

== District court proceedings ==
On July 26, 2013, Gregory Bourke and Michael DeLeon, who were legally married in Ontario, Canada, filed a lawsuit in U.S. District Court for the Western District of Kentucky challenging Kentucky's refusal to recognize their marriage on behalf of themselves and DeLeon's two adopted children. They later added as plaintiffs a couple married in Iowa and another in California, and the four children of one of them. On August 16, a fourth couple, married in Connecticut, filed a related suit in the same court but then joined the suit as plaintiffs. Named as defendants were Kentucky Governor Steve Beshear and Attorney General Jack Conway, as well as Sue Carole Perry, Shelby County Clerk. Their suit, Bourke v. Beshear, argued that Kentucky should recognize same-sex marriages from other jurisdictions. The case was assigned to Judge John G. Heyburn II.

=== Bourke decision ===
In a decision issued February 12, 2014, Judge Heyburn found that Kentucky must recognize same-sex marriages from other jurisdictions because withholding recognition violates the U.S. Constitution's guarantee of equal protection. He wrote:

[T]he Court concludes that Kentucky's denial of recognition for valid same-sex marriages violates the United States Constitution's guarantee of equal protection under the law, even under the most deferential standard of review. Accordingly, Kentucky's statutes and constitutional amendment that mandate this denial are unconstitutional.

He pointed out the evolution of judicial recognition of same-sex marriage: "In Romer, Lawrence, and finally, Windsor, the Supreme Court has moved interstitially ... establishing the framework of cases from which district judges now draw wisdom and inspiration. Each of these small steps has led to this place and this time, where the right of same-sex spouses to the state-conferred benefits of marriage is virtually compelled." He told attorneys he would hold a hearing before issuing an order implementing his decision.

=== Bifurcation of case ===
On February 14, two same-sex couples who were denied marriage licenses in Jefferson County, Timothy Love, Lawrence Ysunza, Maurice Blanchard, and Dominique James, asked to be allowed to intervene in the suit because their challenge to Kentucky's ban on same-sex marriage within the state raises substantially the same arguments as the original suit. On February 27, 2014, before the final order was issued, the state attorney general asked Judge Heyburn to stay enforcement of his Bourke order for 90 days, noting that even if the state does not appeal the decision it needs time to implement it. Judge Heyburn issued a final order in Bourke on the same day ordering the state to recognize same-sex marriages from other jurisdictions at once, which created de jure legalization of recognition of out-of-state same-sex marriages; being a final order it was then immediately subject to appeal. He then bifurcated the case and allowed the new plaintiffs to intervene and argue against Kentucky's denial of marriage licenses to in-state same-sex couples. This portion of the case would remain in district court, retitled as Love v. Beshear. A briefing schedule on the in-state issue was completed by May 28. On February 28, 2014, Judge Heyburn issued a shorter, 21-day stay in Bourke, instead.

=== Bourke appeal ===
On March 4, 2014, the state attorney general announced that he would neither appeal the state's position nor request further stays. Kentucky's governor said he would employ outside counsel to appeal Heyburn's ruling in Bourke to the U.S. Court of Appeals for the Sixth Circuit and to request a stay pending appeal. On March 19, Judge Heyburn extended his stay pending action by the Sixth Circuit, noting the stay granted by the U.S. Supreme Court in a similar Utah case.

An interlocutory appeal of Bourke was lodged in the Sixth Circuit on March 19 under appellate case number 14-5291. By the time oral arguments were scheduled, the decision in the companion case Love v. Beshear was handed down and appealed; the Sixth Circuit thus consolidated the cases for argument (see below).

=== Love decision ===
The addition of intervening plaintiffs the Bourke lawsuit (dealing with the recognition of out-of-state same-sex marriages, see above) on the related issue of denial of marriage licenses to in-state same-sex couples, required the court to bifurcate the case and restyle it. Love v. Beshear continued in district court as to the state marriage license issue, while the out-of-state recognition issue was appealed.

On July 1, 2014, U.S. District Judge John G. Heyburn II found in favor of the intervening same-sex couple plaintiffs and ruled that Kentucky's ban on allowing same-sex marriage in-state violates the Equal Protection Clause.

In doing so, Judge Heyburn departs from the opinions issued by most of the other U.S. district courts that examined the issue; he "does not determine whether Kentucky's laws interfere with a fundamental right." Looking at the trio of marriage cases of Loving v. Virginia, Zablocki v. Redhail, and Turner v. Safley; Judge Heyburn states that:

[T]he question before the Court can be distilled to: is same-sex marriage part of or included in the fundamental right to marry, or is it something else altogether?

He is hesitant to answer in the affirmative, reasoning that "holding that the fundamental right to marry encompasses same-sex marriage would be a dramatic step that the Supreme Court has not yet indicated a willingness to take" (emphasis added.) Judge Heyburn then notes that he can bypass answering this question.

Given the current posture of relevant constitutional jurisprudence, this Court finds caution here a more appropriate approach to avoid overreaching in its own constitutional analysis.

Instead, the judge finds that homosexual persons constitute a suspect class. Although Sixth Circuit precedent suggests that sexual orientation classifications do not receive heightened scrutiny, Heyburn prods the circuit court "to reconsider its view" as this precedent relied on Bowers v. Hardwick, a Supreme Court case subsequently overturned as "not correct when it was decided, and it is not correct today." (citing Lawrence v. Texas, 539 U.S. 558 at 575) He does the analysis required and finds the heightened scrutiny of a "quasi-suspect" class applies to the case; but even under the lower "rational basis" review, the state does not bear its burden in justifying exclusion of same-sex couples from marriage. Heyburn concludes that the defendants' arguments for exclusion, i.e. encouraging relationships that procreate and stabilize the birthrate, "are not those of serious people," finding no relation between same-sex marriage and heterosexual procreation.

Judge Heyburn stayed his ruling in Love pending the outcome of any appeal.

== Court of Appeals proceedings ==
Upon motion of appellee same-sex couples, the U.S. Sixth Circuit Court of Appeals consolidated Love v. Beshear, now docketed 14–5818 on appeal, and dealing with in-state licensing of same-sex marriage — with Bourke v. Beshear, already under appeal under docket 14–5291, and dealing with out-of-state same-sex marriage recognition. A July 16, 2014, order by the Sixth Circuit set an expedited briefing schedule: state appellants' opening brief due July 17, appellee same-sex couples' principal brief due July 24, and appellants' reply due July 31.

Oral arguments for the consolidated Love and Bourke cases were held on August 6, 2014; the Sixth Circuit heard same-sex marriage cases stemming from Michigan, Ohio, Kentucky and Tennessee on that date as well.

=== Reversal ===
On November 6, the Sixth Circuit ruled 2–1 that Kentucky's ban on same-sex marriage does not violate the constitution. It said it was bound by the U.S. Supreme Court's 1972 action in a similar case, Baker v. Nelson, which dismissed a same-sex couple's marriage claim "for want of a substantial federal question." Writing for the majority, Judge Jeffrey Sutton also dismissed the arguments made on behalf of same-sex couples in this case: "Not one of the plaintiffs' theories, however, makes the case for constitutionalizing the definition of marriage and for removing the issue from the place it has been since the founding: in the hands of state voters." Dissenting, Judge Martha Craig Daughtrey wrote: "Because the correct result is so obvious, one is tempted to speculate that the majority has purposefully taken the contrary position to create the circuit split regarding the legality of same-sex marriage that could prompt a grant of certiorari by the Supreme Court and an end to the uncertainty of status and the interstate chaos that the current discrepancy in state laws threatens."

== Supreme Court proceedings ==
The same-sex couples filed an application for certiorari with the U.S. Supreme Court on November 17. On January 16, 2015, the United States Supreme Court consolidated this case with three others from Michigan, Ohio, Kentucky, and Tennessee and agreed to review the case, setting a briefing schedule to be completed April 17. The court asked the parties to address two questions: "1) Does the Fourteenth Amendment require a state to license a marriage between two people of the same sex? 2) Does the Fourteenth Amendment require a state to recognize a marriage between two people of the same sex when their marriage was lawfully licensed and performed out-of-state?"

This case was combined with several others and became part of the Obergefell v. Hodges case which was decided June 26, 2015 by the U.S. Supreme Court in a 5–4 decision that: "The Fourteenth Amendment requires a state to license a marriage between two people of the same sex and to recognize a marriage between two people of the same sex when their marriage was lawfully licensed and performed out-of-state."

== See also ==
- LGBT rights in Kentucky
- Same-sex marriage in Kentucky
- Same-sex marriage in the United States
