= Jack Stockton =

American politician

Member-elect of the Tennessee House of Representatives from the 32nd district
- Assuming office January 12, 2027
- Succeeding: Monty Fritts

Personal details
- Party: Republican
- Website: Campaign website

Jack Stockton is an American politician. A member of the Republican Party, he is the member-elect for the Tennessee House of Representatives for the 32nd district. He was elected at the 2026 election. He retired as Roane County Sheriff in 2026.
