= Tanco v. Haslam =

- Supreme Court of the United States

Argued April 28, 2015
- Full case name: Valeria Tanco and Sophie Jesty, Ijpe DeKoe and Thomas Kostura, and Johno Espejo and Matthew Mansell v. William Edward "Bill" Haslam, as Governor of the State of Tennessee, in his official capacity; Larry Martin, as Commissioner of the Department of Finance and Administration, in his official capacity, and Robert Cooper, as Attorney General & Reporter of the State of Tennessee, in his official capacity
- Related cases: Bourke v. Beshear, DeBoer v. Snyder, Obergefell v. Hodges, Love v. Beshear.

Case history
- Prior: Tanco v. Haslam, 7 F. Supp. 3d 759 (M.D. Tenn. 2014); stay granted, No. 14-5297 (6th Cir. Apr. 25, 2014); reversed sub. nom., DeBoer v. Snyder, 772 F.3d 388 (6th Cir. 2014); cert. granted, 135 S. Ct. 1040 (2015).

Court membership
- Chief Justice John Roberts Associate Justices Antonin Scalia · Anthony Kennedy; Clarence Thomas · Ruth Bader Ginsburg; Stephen Breyer · Samuel Alito; Sonia Sotomayor · Elena Kagan

Laws applied
- U.S. Const. amend. XIV

Tanco v. Haslam was the lead case in the dispute of same-sex marriage in Tennessee. A U.S. District Court granted a preliminary injunction requiring the state to recognize the marriages of the plaintiffs, three same-sex couples. The court found the equal protection analysis used in Bourke v. Beshear, a case dealing with a comparable Kentucky statute "especially persuasive." On April 25, 2014, that injunction was stayed by the Sixth Circuit Court of Appeals. Tanco was appealed to the Sixth Circuit, which reversed the district court and upheld Tennessee's refusal to recognize same-sex marriages from other jurisdictions on November 6.

On January 16, 2015, the U.S. Supreme Court consolidated this case with three others and agreed to review the case. Oral arguments were heard on April 28, 2015.

== District court proceedings ==
On October 21, 2013, local attorneys supported by the National Center for Lesbian Rights filed a lawsuit in U.S. District Court for the Middle District of Tennessee on behalf of four Tennessee same-sex couples seeking to require Tennessee to recognize their marriages. They argued that the state's policy constitutes discrimination on the basis of sexual orientation and violates their rights to due process and equal protection, as well as their right to travel. The suit named as defendants Governor Bill Haslam and 3 other state officials. One of the couples married in New York left the case and the number of defendants was reduced by one.

=== Preliminary injunction granted ===
On March 14, 2014, U.S. District Judge Aleta Trauger granted a preliminary injunction requiring the state to recognize the marriages of the three plaintiff couples. She wrote: "At this point, all signs indicate that, in the eyes of the United States Constitution, the plaintiffs' marriages will be placed on an equal footing with those of heterosexual couples and that proscriptions against same-sex marriage will soon become a footnote in the annals of American history."

=== Stay denied ===
The state immediately filed a motion to stay this ruling, but on March 20, Judge Trauger denied the request, reasoning that unlike the stay ordered by the U.S. Supreme Court in Kitchen v. Herbert "the court's order does not open the floodgates for same-sex couples to marry in Tennessee ... [and] applies only to the three same-sex couples at issue in this case." The Tennessee Attorney General filed an interlocutory appeal in the Sixth Circuit Court of Appeals, asking the circuit court to stay the injunction that forces the state to recognize plaintiffs' marriages. The attorney general cited the stay granted by the U.S. Supreme Court in January in another same-sex marriage case, Kitchen v. Herbert.

== Court of Appeals proceedings ==
On April 25, 2014, the Sixth Circuit, in an unpublished per curiam order, issued a stay of the district court's decision in Tanco, and ordered that the case be assigned to a panel of judges on the Sixth Circuit for expedited consideration on the merits. The effect of this order is to stay the preliminary injunction awarded to plaintiffs by the district court, meaning that the state of Tennessee will no longer have to recognize the legally consummated same-sex marriages of the six named plaintiffs in the Tanco case until after the appeal is decided. The Sixth Circuit said that its decision to stay the order is based on the "unsettled" nature of the law, as well as the public interest and the interests of the parties.

The Sixth Circuit heard oral arguments on August 6. On November 6, the Sixth Circuit ruled 2–1 that Tennessee's ban on same-sex marriage does not violate the constitution. It said it was bound by the U.S. Supreme Court's 1972 action in a similar case, Baker v. Nelson, which dismissed a same-sex couple's marriage claim "for want of a substantial federal question." Writing for the majority, Judge Jeffrey Sutton also dismissed the arguments made on behalf of same-sex couples in this case: "Not one of the plaintiffs' theories, however, makes the case for constitutionalizing the definition of marriage and for removing the issue from the place it has been since the founding: in the hands of state voters." Dissenting, Judge Martha Craig Daughtrey wrote: "Because the correct result is so obvious, one is tempted to speculate that the majority has purposefully taken the contrary position to create the circuit split regarding the legality of same-sex marriage that could prompt a grant of certiorari by the Supreme Court and an end to the uncertainty of status and the interstate chaos that the current discrepancy in state laws threatens."

== Supreme Court proceedings ==
On November 14, the same-sex couples filed an application for certiorari with the U.S. Supreme Court. They asked the court to consider whether the U.S. Constitution protects a "fundamental right to marry", whether Tennessee's refusal to recognize same-sex marriages from other jurisdictions unlawfully restricts their right to travel, and whether the Supreme Court's dismissal of Baker v. Nelson (1972) is binding precedent in this case. Tennessee officials filed a brief in opposition to the plaintiffs' petition on December 15.

On January 16, 2015, the United States Supreme Court consolidated this case with three others and agreed to review the case. It set a briefing schedule to be completed April 17. The court asked the parties to address two questions: "1) Does the Fourteenth Amendment require a state to license a marriage between two people of the same sex? 2) Does the Fourteenth Amendment require a state to recognize a marriage between two people of the same sex when their marriage was lawfully licensed and performed out-of-state?" The plaintiff-petitioners told the court that Douglas Hallward-Driemeier of the law firm of Ropes & Gray would represent them at oral argument.

On June 26, 2015, the U.S. Supreme Court ruled on the case, which had been consolidated with three other cases from Michigan, Ohio, and Kentucky, in Obergefell v. Hodges. In a 5–4 decision written by Justice Kennedy and joined by Justices Ginsburg, Breyer, Sotomayor, and Kagan, the Supreme Court held that state bans on same-sex marriage are a violation of the Due Process and Equal Protection Clauses of the Fourteenth Amendment. This ruling extended the right to same-sex marriage to the entire United States and required that states recognize same-sex marriages legally performed in other states. The ruling continued Justice Anthony Kennedy's legacy as a top jurist for gay rights in America, having now written four high court opinion favoring gays and lesbians; June 26, 2015 was the 2-year anniversary of the decision in United States v. Windsor, which overturned part of the federal Defense of Marriage Act, and the 12th anniversary of the decision in Lawrence v. Texas, which overturned anti-sodomy laws in the United States. Kennedy issued his first major gay rights decision in 1996 in Romer v. Evans.

== See also ==
- Recognition of same-sex unions in Tennessee
- Same-sex marriage in the United States
- LGBT rights in Tennessee
- Tennessee Equality Project
