= History of same-sex marriage in the United States =

In the United States, the history of same-sex marriage dates from the 1800s with union of Charity Bryant and Sylvia Drake. They became more publicly discussed beginning in the early 1940s, when the first lawsuits seeking legal recognition of same-sex relationships brought the question of civil marriage rights and benefits for same-sex couples to public attention though they proved unsuccessful. However marriage wasn't a request for the LGBTQ movement until the Second National March on Washington for Lesbian and Gay Rights in Washington (1987). The subject became increasingly prominent in U.S. politics following the 1993 Hawaii Supreme Court decision in Baehr v. Miike that suggested the possibility that the state's prohibition might be unconstitutional. That decision was met by actions at both the federal and state level to restrict marriage to male-female couples, notably the enactment at the federal level of the Defense of Marriage Act.

The first legal same-sex marriage ceremony in the United States happened on February 12, 2004 between Del Martin and Phyllis Lyon, when mayor of San Francisco Gavin Newsom ordered city hall to issue marriage licenses to same-sex couples. This decision resulted in the celebration of the first gay marriage in the United States, when Martin and Lyon became the first gay couple to tie the knot and get official recognition of their fifty year relationship (Marriage Equality New York).

On May 17, 2004, Massachusetts became the first U.S. state and the sixth jurisdiction in the world to legalize same-sex marriage following the Supreme Judicial Court's decision in Goodridge v. Department of Public Health six months earlier. Just as with the Hawaii decision, the legalization of same-sex marriage in Massachusetts provoked a reaction from opponents of same-sex marriage that resulted in further legal restrictions being written into state statutes and constitutions. On August 4, 2004, a Washington court ruled for the plaintiffs in a suit challenging that state's defense of marriage act. King County Superior Court Judge William L. Downing became the first trial judge in the nation to rule that a state law prohibiting same-sex marriages, or DOMA, was unconstitutional; the ruling was narrowly overturned on appeal in 2006. The movement to obtain marriage rights for same-sex couples expanded steadily from that time until in late 2014 lawsuits had been brought in every state that still denied marriage licenses to same-sex couples.

By late 2014, same-sex marriage had become legal in states that contained more than 70% of the United States population. In some jurisdictions legalization came through the action of state courts or the enactment of state legislation. More frequently it came as the result of the decisions of federal courts. On November 6, 2012, Maine, Maryland, and Washington became the first states to legalize same-sex marriage through popular vote. Same-sex marriage has been legalized in the District of Columbia and 21 Native American tribal nations as well.

The June 2013 decision of the U.S. Supreme Court in United States v. Windsor striking down the law barring federal recognition of same-sex marriage gave significant impetus to the progress of lawsuits that challenged state bans on same-sex marriage in federal court. Since that decision, with only a few exceptions, U.S. District Courts and Courts of Appeals have found state bans on same-sex marriage unconstitutional, as have several state courts. The exceptions have been a state court in Tennessee, U.S. district courts in Louisiana and Puerto Rico, and the U.S. Court of Appeals for the Sixth Circuit. The U.S. Supreme Court agreed to hear appeals from that circuit's decision.

On June 26, 2015, the U.S. Supreme Court struck down all state bans on same-sex marriage, legalized it in all fifty states, and required states to honor out-of-state same-sex marriage licenses in the case Obergefell v. Hodges.

== Early years ==
Historical documents do record numerous examples of same-sex couples living in relationships that functioned as marriages even if they could not be legally sanctified as such. Historian Rachel Hope Cleves documents one such relationship, that of 19th-century Vermont residents Charity Bryant and Sylvia Drake, in her 2014 book Charity and Sylvia: A Same-Sex Marriage in Early America.

Same-sex marriage was, however, rarely mentioned or recognized as a political issue before the 1970s. In August 1953, officials of the U.S Post Office delayed delivery of that month's issue of ONE magazine, with the cover story "Homosexual Marriage?", for three weeks while they tried to determine whether its contents were obscene. Few mentions of the subject have been documented in the decades that followed. In June 1971, members of the Gay Activists Alliance demanded marriage rights for same-sex couples at New York City's Marriage License Bureau.

The Minnesota Supreme Court ruled in October 1971 that Minnesota's laws prohibiting marriages between same-sex partners did not violate the federal constitution. In October 1972, the U.S. Supreme Court declined to consider the case, Baker v. Nelson, "for want of a substantial federal question." Baker set federal precedent that blocked federal courts from ruling on the constitutionality of same-sex marriage for decades. The next year, the National Coalition of Gay Organizations called for the repeal of all statutes limiting marriage to different-sex couples and for extending the legal benefits of marriage to all cohabiting couples.

Several states enacted bans on same-sex marriage in the late 1970s as well, including Virginia in 1975, and Florida, California, and Wyoming in 1977.

=== Activist debate ===
In the late 1980s, activists debated whether marriage rights should be at the forefront of the broader campaign for LGBT equality. Some of the oldest groups saw marriage as a contradiction of the radical origins of the gay rights movement in the sexual liberation movement of the 1960s. Others raised the tactical objection that a step-by step campaign that focused on near-term potential victories like anti-discrimination statutes stood a greater chance of long term success. In 1989, as a contribution to this debate, Andrew Sullivan's essay "Here Comes the Groom: A (Conservative) Case for Gay Marriage" appeared in The New Republic. In late 1993, Bruce Bawer in A Place at the Table contended using traditional moral arguments that same-sex relationships merit legal and religious recognition as marriages. He identified himself as part of a "silent majority" of non-radicals unrepresented in media depictions of gay and lesbian life and criticized the gay community for identifying homosexuality with sexual behavior.

The issue of marriage had enough appeal within the gay and lesbian community that in April 1993, as part of the demonstrations surrounding the gay rights march in Washington, D.C., about 1,500 same-sex couples staged a mass wedding ceremony with "a dozen ministers, organ music, photographers and rice" at the National Museum of Natural History to call for marriage rights for gays and lesbians.

=== Hawaii and reaction ===
The Hawaii case of Baehr v. Miike attracted national attention when the Hawaii Supreme Court on May 5, 1993, ordered a trial court to consider whether the state could demonstrate that denying marriage licenses to same-sex couples "furthers compelling state interests and is narrowly drawn to avoid unnecessary abridgments of constitutional rights."

Congressional reaction to that ruling, partly in anticipation of the approaching presidential election, resulted in the enactment of the Defense of Marriage Act (DOMA), which denied federal recognition of same-sex marriages. President Bill Clinton signed it into law on September 21, 1996. In November 1998, Hawaii voters approved a state constitutional amendment allowing their legislature to ban same-sex marriage, (Note: Unlike similar state constitutional amendments, Hawaii's did not explicitly ban same-sex marriage. Instead it allowed the legislature the option of doing so.) and Alaska voters approved a state constitutional amendment defining marriage as the union of one man and one woman.

=== Lawrence v. Texas ===
In parallel with the campaign for same-sex marriage, LGBT civil rights gained legal recognition. In 2003, the U.S. Supreme Court struck down Texas' "Homosexual Conduct" law in Lawrence v. Texas. The ruling rendered same-sex sodomy laws in Kansas, Oklahoma and Missouri and broader sodomy laws in nine other states unenforceable.

=== Baker v. Vermont ===
In 1999, the Supreme Court of Vermont ruled that denying the benefits of marriage to same-sex couples was against the state constitution.

== Massachusetts and reactions ==
On November 18, 2003, the Massachusetts Supreme Judicial Court ruled in Goodridge v. Department of Public Health that denying marriage rights to same-sex couples violated the Massachusetts Constitution. Massachusetts became the first United States jurisdiction to license and recognize same-sex marriages beginning May 17, 2004 after Chief Justice Margaret Marshall wrote the majority opinion in the court ruling.

In February and March 2004, city officials in San Francisco issued marriage licenses to about 4000 same-sex couples before being ordered to stop by the California Supreme Court. On February 20, 2004, the clerk in Sandoval County, New Mexico, issued marriage licenses to same-sex couples for a day until the state attorney general issued an opinion that they were "invalid under state law". Similar actions occurred in New Paltz, New York (February 27); Multnomah County, Oregon (March 3); and Asbury Park, New Jersey (March 8).

On August 4, 2004, a Washington court ruled for the plaintiffs in a suit challenging that state's defense of marriage act. King County Superior Court Judge William L. Downing became the first trial judge in the nation to rule that a state law prohibiting same-sex marriages, or DOMA, was unconstitutional, a finding for the plaintiffs in an opinion hailed as poetic and controversial. The trial court ruling in Andersen v. King County was narrowly overturned by the Washington Supreme Court in 2006.

On November 2, 2004, voters in eleven states—Arkansas, Georgia, Kentucky, Michigan, Mississippi, Montana, North Dakota, Ohio, Oklahoma, Oregon, and Utah—approved state constitutional amendments defining marriage as the union of one man and one woman. Kansas did so on April 5, 2005, as did Texas voters on November 8 of that year.

The adverse reactions continued in 2006. Alabama voters approved a state constitutional amendment defining marriage as the union of one man and one woman on June 6. Voters in Colorado, Idaho, South Carolina, South Dakota, Tennessee, Virginia, and Wisconsin adopted similar amendments on election day, November 7. The only exception that day was Arizona, where voters rejected an initiative banning the recognition same-sex marriages and civil unions.

California Governor Arnold Schwarzenegger twice vetoed legislation that would have made same-sex marriage legal there, in September 2005 and October 2007.

== 2008 ==
=== Decision and reversal in California ===
On May 15, 2008, the Supreme Court of California issued a decision that legalized same-sex marriage in California, holding that California's existing opposite-sex definition of marriage violated the constitutional rights of same-sex couples. To overturn the decision, opponents of same-sex marriage placed a state constitutional amendment on the November ballot. Known as Proposition 8, it passed in November 2008, ending the licensing and recognition of same-sex marriages in California after less than six months.

In two more states, Arizona and Florida, voters approved constitutional amendments defining marriage as the union of one man and one woman.

=== Court ruling: Connecticut ===
On October 10, 2008, the Connecticut Supreme Court ruled that the state's civil unions statute discriminated against same-sex couples and required the state to recognize same-sex marriages. On November 12, 2008, the first marriage licenses to same-sex couples were issued and the following year, the state enacted gender-neutral marriage legislation.

=== National political parties ===
In August and September, the national political parties addressed same-sex marriage in their party platforms. The Democratic National Convention adopted a platform that "oppose[s] the Defense of Marriage Act and all attempts to use this issue to divide us" and suggested support for same-sex marriage: "We support the full inclusion of all families, including same-sex couples, in the life of our nation, and support equal responsibility, benefits, and protections." The Republican National Convention platform said that judges are "undermining traditional marriage laws", endorsed the Federal Marriage Amendment and state initiatives that support "traditional marriage", and referenced "the right of states not to recognize same-sex 'marriages'".

== 2009 ==
=== Court decision: Iowa ===
On April 3, 2009, a unanimous Iowa Supreme Court ruling upheld a lower court ruling in Varnum v. Brien that denying marriage rights to same-sex couples violated the state constitution, and licenses became available on April 27. In the next judicial retention elections in November 2010, Iowa voters removed three of the justices that participated in the Varnum decision, following a campaign by groups, largely out-of-state, opposed to same-sex marriage including the National Organization for Marriage. The ruling, nonetheless, remained in place.

=== Legislation: Vermont, New Hampshire, District of Columbia ===
On April 7, 2009, Vermont legalized same-sex marriage through legislation. The Governor of Vermont had previously vetoed the measure, but the veto was overridden by the Legislature. Vermont was the first state in the United States to legalize same-sex marriage through legislative means rather than litigation.

On June 3, 2009, New Hampshire by enacting legislation became the sixth state to legalize same-sex marriage, effective January 1, 2010.

On December 18, 2009, the Council of the District of Columbia enacted legislation legalizing same-sex marriage and same-sex marriage licenses became available on March 3, 2010.

=== Enactment and reversal in Maine ===
On May 6, 2009, Maine Governor John Baldacci signed a law legalizing same-sex marriage, becoming the first state governor to do so. Nonetheless, the legislation was stayed pending a vote and never went into effect. It was repealed by referendum in November 2009.

=== Respect for Marriage Act ===
In September 2009, several Democratic members of Congress proposed legislation to repeal DOMA. Barney Frank opposed the move because he thought its enactment impossible. Nancy Pelosi had warned earlier in the year that the legislative calendar had no room for the issue.

== 2010 ==
As of January 2010, 29 states had constitutional provisions restricting marriage to one man and one woman, while 12 others had statutes that did so. Nineteen states banned any legal recognition of same-sex unions that would be equivalent to civil marriage. Voters had approved 28 out of 30 popular referendums in which states asked voters to adopt a constitutional amendment or initiative defining marriage as the union of a man and a woman. (Note: Alabama, Alaska, Arkansas, California, Colorado, Florida, Georgia, Idaho, Kansas, Kentucky, Louisiana, Michigan, Mississippi, Missouri, Montana, Nebraska, Nevada, North Dakota, Ohio, Oklahoma, Oregon, South Carolina, South Dakota, Tennessee, Texas, Utah, Virginia, Wisconsin. See Attempts to establish same-sex unions via initiative or statewide referendum) Arizonans voted down one such amendment in 2006, but approved a different amendment to that effect in 2008.

== 2011 ==
=== Legislation: New York ===
On June 24, 2011, New York Governor Andrew Cuomo signed the state's Marriage Equality Act into law. (Note: New York courts had previously mandated the recognition of same-sex marriages established elsewhere.) It took effect a month later.

== 2012 ==
=== Legislation: Washington, Maryland ===
Washington Governor Christine Gregoire signed same-sex marriage legislation into law on February 13, 2012. Maryland Governor Martin O'Malley did the same on March 1.

=== National politics ===
The Republican National Convention approved a platform that asserts the right of the federal government and each state to deny legal recognition to same-sex marriages and endorsed a constitutional amendment defining marriage as the union of one man and one woman. The Democratic National Convention adopted a political platform that supported marriage equality for the first time in its history and opposed all constitutional amendments that would exclude same-sex couples from marriage.

=== Balloting results ===
On May 8, 2012, North Carolina voters approved a constitutional amendment banning same-sex marriage as well as all other types of same-sex unions. (Note: North Carolina already prohibited same-sex marriages by statute.)

In the regular November 2012 elections, voters for the first time approved the legalization of same-sex marriage by popular vote in three states: Maine, Maryland, and Washington. Maine's law took effect on December 29, 2012. Maryland started allowing same-sex marriages on January 1, 2013, (Note: Maryland had previously recognized same-sex marriages formed in other jurisdictions.) In Washington state, the first licenses were distributed on December 6, with the first marriages on December 9 following the mandatory three-day waiting period. In the same election, Minnesota rejected a constitutional ban on same-sex marriage. (Note: In 2006, Arizona had rejected an amendment that banned same-sex marriage and all other forms of same-sex unions. The amendment rejected in Minnesota banned only same-sex marriage.)

== 2013 ==
=== United States v. Windsor ===
On June 26, 2013, the U.S. Supreme Court issued a 5–4 decision in United States v. Windsor, ruling Section 3 of DOMA unconstitutional "as a deprivation of the equal liberty ... protected by the Fifth Amendment." The decision was widely quoted by both sides in same-sex marriage lawsuits.

=== Court rulings: California, New Jersey, New Mexico ===
On August 4, 2010, a decision by a U.S. District Court in Perry v. Schwarzenegger ruled that California's Proposition 8 was unconstitutional. The Supreme Court dismissed the case for lack of standing on June 26, 2013, after which the issuance of marriage licenses to same-sex couples resumed on June 28, 2013.

New Jersey began issuing same-sex marriage licenses on October 21, 2013, following a September 27 state superior court decision that found an equal protection right of same-sex couples to marry. It reasoned that with the U.S. Supreme Court's recent action in United States v. Windsor, couples in New Jersey civil unions lacked access to federal benefits they could now receive if married. (Note: In 2006, the New Jersey Supreme Court had required the state legislature to amend the state's marriage laws or create civil unions.) Governor Chris Christie, who had vetoed legislation legalizing same-sex marriage in February 2012, filed an appeal to the New Jersey Supreme Court, but withdrew it after the court refused to stay the lower court's ruling.

Eight New Mexico counties, either on the basis of a court decision or their clerks' own volition, began issuing marriage licenses to same-sex couples in August 2013. On December 19, 2013, the New Mexico Supreme Court ruled unanimously that same-sex marriage would be permitted throughout the state, effective immediately.

=== State legislation: Rhode Island, Delaware, Minnesota, Hawaii, Illinois ===
Several jurisdictions enacted same-sex marriage in 2013. Rhode Island enacted legislation on May 2, which took effect August 1; Delaware enacted legislation on May 7, which took effect July 1; and Minnesota enacted legislation on May 14, which took effect August 1. In October and November 2013, the Hawaii legislature enacted legislation legalizing same-sex marriage, which Governor Neil Abercrombie signed on November 13. The law took effect on December 2, 2013. Illinois Governor Pat Quinn signed legislation legalizing same-sex marriage on November 20, effective June 1, 2014, though in practice marriage licenses became widely available to same-sex couples in March. (Note: On February 21, 2014 U.S District Judge Sharon Johnson Coleman ruled that same-sex couples in Cook County, which includes Illinois' largest city Chicago, could obtain marriage licenses immediately and need not wait until the law's June 1 effective date. On February 26, 2014, a Champaign County clerk began issuing same-sex marriage licenses after consulting the State's Attorney and concluding that the Cook County order was applicable. On March 4, Illinois Attorney General Lisa Madigan issued an opinion that a recent court decision ordering Cook County to issue marriage licenses immediately did not apply to all county clerks, but advised clerks that they should find the decision "persuasive as you evaluate whether to issue marriage licenses to same-sex couples." Governor Pat Quinn then announced that the Illinois Department of Public Health would record marriages issued by any county clerk. Several of the state's 102 county clerks began, or announced plans to begin, issuing marriage licenses to same-sex couples in March.)

=== Utah court ruling and subsequent stay ===
On December 20, 2013, U.S. District Court Judge Robert J. Shelby found Utah's same-sex marriage ban unconstitutional in Kitchen v. Herbert. Salt Lake County began issuing marriage licenses immediately, followed by other counties, until the state obtained a stay from the U.S. Supreme Court on January 6, 2014.

== 2014 ==
On January 10, U.S. Attorney General Eric Holder announced that the federal government would recognize the marriages of same-sex couples who married in Utah between December 20, 2013, and January 6, 2014.

=== Court decisions: Oregon and Pennsylvania ===
On May 19, 2014, U.S. District Judge Michael J. McShane ruled in Geiger v. Kitzhaber that Oregon's voter-approved constitutional amendment banning same-sex marriage was unconstitutional. He ordered marriages to begin immediately and Governor John Kitzhaber applauded the decision. The National Organization for Marriage sought without success to intervene to seek a stay and appeal the decision.

On May 20, 2014, U.S. District Judge John E. Jones III struck down Pennsylvania's same-sex marriage ban in his ruling in Whitewood v. Wolf. (Note: In July 2013, a court clerk in Montgomery County, Pennsylvania, began issuing marriage licenses to same-sex couples, with the rationale that the state marriage statutes were unconstitutional, but his action was overruled by a state intermediate appellate court in September and he was ordered to cease issuing the licenses.) Governor Tom Corbett said he would not appeal the court decision, allowing same-sex marriages to be licensed in Pennsylvania. One county clerk has tried repeatedly to intervene in the lawsuit until U.S. Supreme Court Justice Samuel Alito, Circuit Justice for the Third Circuit, denied the clerk's application for a stay on July 8, 2014, and the Third Circuit denied the clerk's petition to rehear her case for intervention on August 4, 2014.

=== Louisiana ban upheld ===
On September 3, District Judge Martin Feldman ruled against the plaintiff same-sex couples in Robicheaux v. Caldwell, upholding Louisiana's ban on same-sex marriage. It was the first decision of a federal court since the U.S. Supreme Court ruling in Windsor in June 2013 to uphold the constitutionality of a state ban on same-sex marriage.

=== U.S. Supreme Court declines cases ===
On October 6, 2014, the U.S. Supreme Court declined to take action on all five cases it had been asked to consider from appellate courts in the Fourth, Seventh, and Tenth Circuits, allowing the circuit court decisions striking down marriage bans to stand.

==== States with cases at issue: Virginia, Indiana, Wisconsin, Oklahoma, Utah ====
The Supreme Court's action allowed the decisions of the lower courts to take effect. It resulted in the prompt legalization of same-sex marriage in several states with cases at issue:

- Fourth Circuit: Virginia (Note: On July 28, 2014, the Fourth Circuit affirmed the unconstitutionality of Virginia's ban on same-sex marriage in Bostic v. Schaefer. On February 13, 2014, U.S. District Court Judge Arenda Wright Allen ruled that the state's ban on same-sex marriage was unconstitutional. She stayed enforcement of her ruling in Bostic v. Rainey pending appeal. The U.S. Supreme Court issued a stay on August 20, 2014, one day before the Fourth Circuit's mandate was to go into effect.)
- Seventh Circuit: (Note: On September 4, 2014, a three-judge panel of the Seventh Circuit Court of Appeals unanimously affirmed the unconstitutionality of Indiana and Wisconsin's bans on same-sex marriage in Baskin v. Bogan. The Court stayed its decision before it took effect, pending action by U.S. Supreme Court.) Indiana (Note: On June 25, 2014, U.S. District Court Judge Richard L. Young ruled that Indiana's ban on same-sex marriage unconstitutional. He did not issue a stay on his ruling and instructed all state agencies to provide marital benefits to same-sex couples. Two days later, the Seventh Circuit Court of Appeals issued a stay pending appeal.) and Wisconsin (Note: On June 6, 2014, U.S. District Court Judge Barbara Bandriff Crabb struck down Wisconsin's same-sex marriage ban in Wolf v. Walker. She issued no order forbidding enforcement of the state's ban, and county clerks in at least 60 counties began issuing marriage licenses to same-sex couples. After Judge Barbara Crabb refused to stay her ruling, Wisconsin's attorney general J. B. Van Hollen requested a stay from the Seventh Circuit Court of Appeals in Chicago. On June 13, the judge put the ruling on hold, pending appeal.)
- Tenth Circuit: Oklahoma (Note: On January 14, 2014, U.S. District Court Judge Terence C. Kern ruled in Bishop v. Oklahoma that Oklahoma's ban on same-sex marriage is unconstitutional. He stayed his ruling pending appeal.) and Utah (Note: On June 25, 2014, the Tenth Circuit Court affirmed Judge Robert Shelby's ruling striking Utah's same-sex marriage ban. It was the first time a federal appeals court recognized that same-sex couples have a fundamental right to marry. The judgment was stayed pending review from the Supreme Court.)

==== Other states in the affected circuits: Colorado, West Virginia, North Carolina, Wyoming, South Carolina, Kansas ====
Same-sex marriage bans were expected to end in six other states in the three circuits affected by the Supreme Court's action.–Colorado, Kansas, North Carolina, South Carolina, West Virginia, and Wyoming–but at first officials in South Carolina, Wyoming, and Kansas said they would continue to defend their states' bans.

In Colorado, Attorney General John Suthers asked the Tenth Circuit to dismiss his appeal and lift its stay in Burns v. Hickenlooper. He asked the State Supreme Court to lift a stay preventing certain clerks from issuing marriage licenses to same-sex couples. Both courts lifted their stays on October 7, 2014, and Suthers ordered all county clerks to issue marriage licenses to same-sex couples. (Note: On July 9, 2014, a state judge struck down Colorado's same-sex marriage ban in Brinkman v. Long, staying the decision pending appeal. A number of county clerks issued marriage licenses to same-sex couples on July 29, 2014, before an order from the Colorado Supreme Court halted the practice. On July 23, in Burns v. Hickenlooper, U.S. District Judge Raymond P. Moore also ruled that Colorado's ban against same-sex marriage is unconstitutional. On August 21, the Tenth Circuit Court of Appeals stayed the enforcement of Burns pending action by the U.S. Supreme Court on petitions for certiorari in similar cases.)

In West Virginia, on October 9, Governor Ray Tomblin announced he was ordering state agencies to act in compliance with the decision of the Fourth Circuit Court of Appeals in ''Bostic v Schaefer'' on the unconstitutionality of same-sex marriage bans.

In North Carolina, District Court Judge Max O. Cogburn, Jr., ruling in General Synod of the United Church of Christ v. Cooper on October 10, 2014, struck down North Carolina's ban on same-sex marriage, citing the Fourth Circuit's ruling in Bostic v. Schaefer. Some North Carolina clerks began issuing marriage license to same-sex couple immediately.

In Wyoming, on October 17, U.S. District Judge Scott Skavdahl ruled for the plaintiff same-sex couples in Guzzo v. Mead, but stayed enforcement of his ruling until October 23 or until the defendants informed the court that they will not appeal to the Tenth Circuit. The stay was lifted on October 21 when the state notified the court it would not appeal, ending enforcement of Wyoming's ban on same-sex marriage.

In South Carolina, on November 12, U.S. District Court Judge Richard Gergel ruled South Carolina's ban on same-sex marriage unconstitutional in Condon v. Haley. He issued a temporary stay of his ruling, which took effect on November 20 after the U.S. Supreme Court refused to extend it. (Note: Earlier, on October 8, 2014, some same-sex couples obtained marriage licenses in South Carolina, but the South Carolina Supreme Court ordered a halt to their issuance the next day.)

As of February 2015, Kansas remains the only state in the circuits affected by the Supreme Court's October 6 refusal to grant cert to continue to enforce in large measure its denial of marriage rights to same-sex couples. Many judges of the state's district courts issue marriage licenses to same-sex couples. Some began doing so based on their reading of Tenth Circuit precedent, others a few weeks later on the basis on a ruling against Kansas' ban on same-sex marriage issued on November 4, 2014, by U.S. District Judge Daniel D. Crabtree in Marie v. Moser, following Kansas Attorney General Derek Schmidt's failure to win a stay of that ruling from the Tenth Circuit and the U.S. Supreme Court. A Kansas Supreme Court decision in a state case, State v. Moriarty, affirmed the right of a circuit judge to determine the validity of the state's ban. The state contends that it need only recognize licenses issued in the two counties whose officials were named in the federal lawsuit and subject to the order issued in that case.

=== Ninth Circuit decision ===
==== States with cases at issue ====
On October 7, 2014, the Ninth Circuit Court of Appeals ruled in two cases, overturning a district court in Nevada that had found that state's ban on same-sex marriage constitutional and affirming the decision of a district court in Idaho that had found that state's ban unconstitutional. (Note: On May 13, 2014, U.S. District Magistrate Judge Candy Dale in Latta v. Otter issued a ruling striking down Idaho's ban on marriage for same-sex couples. On May 20, a three-judge panel of the Ninth Circuit Court of Appeals issued a stay pending appeal.) Following precedent in that circuit, it reviewed the states' bans against a higher standard than used by other courts, "heightened scrutiny". (Note: On January 21, a three-judge panel of the Ninth Circuit, considering issues unrelated to marriage in SmithKline Beecham Corporation v. Abbott Laboratories, ruled that distinctions based on sexual orientation are subject to the "heightened scrutiny" standard of review. In response to that decision, on February 10, Nevada State Attorney General Catherine Cortez Masto withdrew the state's brief in Sevcik v. Sandoval, ending its defense of the state's ban on same-sex marriage.) Idaho Governor Butch Otter announced the state would no longer attempt to preserve the state's denial of marriage rights to same-sex couples, though he continued without success to seek review by the U.S. Supreme Court. On October 13, 2014, the Ninth Circuit lifted the stay it had imposed in Latta v. Otter, allowing the district court decision to take effect, preventing further enforcement of Idaho's ban on same-sex marriage as of October 15, 2014.

==== Other states in the Ninth Circuit: Alaska, Arizona, and Montana ====
- Alaska. On October 12, 2014, Judge Timothy M. Burgess ruled that Alaska's denial of marriage rights to same-sex couples was unconstitutional and issued an injunction to prevent state officials from continuing to enforce it. The head of the state Bureau of Vital Statistics said, "We expect our office will be busy tomorrow, (October 13) but we will make every effort to help customers as quickly as possible."
- Arizona. On October 17, 2014, U.S. District Judge John W. Sedwick declared Arizona's ban on same-sex marriage unconstitutional and enjoined the state from enforcing its ban, effective immediately. Arizona Attorney General Tom Horne said the state would not appeal the ruling and instructed county clerks to issue marriage licenses to same-sex couples.
- Montana. On November 19, 2014, U.S. District Court Judge Brian Morris ruled Montana's ban on same-sex marriage unconstitutional in Rolando v. Fox, immediately legalizing same-sex marriage there

=== Sixth Circuit decision ===
On November 6, 2014, the Court of Appeals for the Sixth Circuit, in a 2-1 decision, upheld the same-sex marriage bans in Kentucky, Michigan, Ohio, and Tennessee. The cases were:

In Kentucky, on February 12, U.S. District Judge John G. Heyburn declared Kentucky's refusal to recognize same-sex marriages from other jurisdictions unconstitutional. On February 27, he ordered the state to recognize same-sex marriages performed in other jurisdictions, but the next day he stayed that order until March 20, and on March 19, he stayed it pending action by the Sixth Circuit. On July 1, a judge ruled in Love v. Beshear that Kentucky's refusal to license same-sex marriages was unconstitutional and stayed that ruling.

In Michigan, on March 21, U.S. District Court Judge Bernard A. Friedman found Michigan's ban on same-sex marriage unconstitutional. He did not stay enforcement of his decision. Michigan Attorney General Bill Schuette filed an emergency request with the Sixth Circuit Court of Appeals for a stay pending appeal. Hundreds of same-sex couples obtained marriage licenses and some married in Michigan on the morning of March 22 before the appeals court temporarily stayed enforcement of the ruling. On March 26, Michigan Governor Rick Snyder said the Sixth Circuit's stay meant that "the rights tied to these marriages are suspended". On January 15, 2015, U.S. District Judge Mark A. Goldsmith ruled in Caspar v. Snyder that Michigan must recognize the validity of more than 300 marriages of same-sex couples married the previous March in the time between a district court found the state's ban on same-sex marriage unconstitutional and the Sixth Circuit Court of Appeals stayed that ruling.

The same-sex couples in all these cases asked the U.S. Supreme Court to review them, and the state officials in Kentucky, Michigan, and Ohio who had won in the Sixth Circuit endorsed those requests in order to have a Supreme Court ruling on the subject of same-sex marriage.

=== Decisions being appealed: Arkansas, Mississippi, and Missouri ===
In Missouri, on November 5, 2014, a state judge in St. Louis ruled Missouri's ban unconstitutional. Missouri Attorney General Chris Koster announced plans to appeal the ruling to the Missouri Supreme Court, but not to seek a stay of the ruling's implementation because "[f]ollowing decisions in Idaho and Alaska, the United States Supreme Court has refused to grant stays on identical facts." The ruling directed St. Louis to issue marriage licenses to same-sex couples and the city's marriage license department immediately complied. St. Louis County, where an official said "We believe it's a county-by-county decision", began issuing marriage licenses to same-sex couples the next day. Koster and the Recorders' Association of Missouri said the decision only applied to the city of St. Louis. On November 7, a U.S. District Court judge ruled in Lawson v. Jackson County that Missouri's ban on same-sex marriage was unconstitutional. He stayed enforcement of his ruling pending appeal, and the Attorney General announced plans to appeal to the Eighth Circuit. In Jackson County, which includes Kansas City, officials began issuing marriage licenses to same-sex couples the same day.

On November 25, 2014, U.S. District Judge Kristine Baker struck down Arkansas' ban on same-sex marriage in Jernigan v. Crane, and she stayed enforcement of her ruling pending appeal.

On November 25, 2014, in Campaign for Southern Equality v. Bryant, U.S. District Judge Carlton W. Reeves found Mississippi's ban on same-sex marriage unconstitutional and issued a 14-day stay, and the Fifth Circuit Court of Appeals issued a stay pending appeal on December 4.

== 2014–2015 ==
=== Florida ===
U.S. District Judge Robert L. Hinkle, ruling in Brenner v. Scott, had found Florida's ban on same-sex marriage unconstitutional on August 21, 2014, and stayed enforcement pending further appeals. (Note: In July and August 2014, several state judges in Florida found the state constitution's ban on same-sex marriage unconstitutional; their jurisdiction was limited and all their orders were stayed.) On December 19, the U.S. Supreme Court refused to extend his stay, the first time that the Supreme Court refused to stay a marriage equality ruling by a district court in a circuit that had not yet ruled on the issue of same-sex marriage.

On January 1, 2015, after he had been challenged by some court clerks who believed he could not use the case to require them to license same-sex marriages, Judge Hinkle explained the scope of his injunction in Brenner v. Scott, writing that the Constitution rather than his order authorizes all Florida clerks to issue licenses to same-sex couples and that while clerks are free to interpret his ruling differently they should anticipate lawsuits if they fail to issue such licenses. In response, the law firm advising the Florida Association of Court Clerks reversed its earlier position and recommended that all clerks issue marriage licenses to same-sex couples. (Note: A state court ruling in Pareto v. Ruvin on January 5 allowed same-sex couples to obtain marriage licenses in Miami-Dade County that afternoon,) Same-sex marriage became legal throughout Florida when Hinkle's injunction took effect on January 6.

=== U.S. Supreme Court accepts cases ===
On January 16, the U.S. Supreme Court agreed to hear four cases on appeal from the Sixth Circuit, consolidating them as one and setting a briefing schedule to be completed April 17. The cases were: Obergefell v. Hodges (Ohio), Tanco v. Haslam (Tennessee), DeBoer v. Snyder (Michigan), and Bourke v. Beshear (Kentucky). Attorney General Eric Holder announced that the Department of Justice would file an amicus brief in the case asking the court to "make marriage equality a reality for all Americans". The Court refused a request for certiorari before judgment in a Louisiana case, Robicheaux v. Caldwell, on January 12.

In the weeks that followed, some federal courts suspended proceedings while awaiting a decision from the U.S. Supreme Court. The Eleventh Circuit Court of Appeals did so in cases from Florida case, Brenner v. Scott, Georgia, Inniss v. Aderhold, and Alabama, Searcy v. Strange. A U.S. district court did so in North Dakota, Ramsay v. Dalrymple.

=== Alabama ===
On January 23, 2015 U.S. District Judge Callie V.S. Granade ruled in Searcy v. Strange that Alabama's ban on same-sex marriage was unconstitutional. On January 25, Judge Granade stayed her ruling for 14 days to allow the state to seek a longer stay from the Eleventh Circuit Court of Appeals. A stay was denied by both the Eleventh Circuit Court of Appeals and the U.S. Supreme Court. On January 27, Judge Granade ruled in a second lawsuit, Strawser v. Strange in favor of a male couple seeking the right to marry on Alabama. She stayed her ruling to coincide with her stay in Searcy. With a conflicting order from the Alabama Supreme Court Chief Justice Roy Moore ordering county clerks to not comply with the federal rulings, the Probate Judges Association acknowledged that the order in Searcy, if lifted, requires them to issue marriage licenses to same-sex couples and said it would encourage its members to comply. A week after the rulings went into effect, the majority of counties began issuing marriage licenses to same-sex couples.

On March 3, 2015, the Alabama Supreme Court ordered all counties in the state to stop issuing marriage licenses to same-sex couples. Granade issued an injunction on May 21, 2015, clarifying that her order for same-sex marriage applied statewide. However, she stayed the ruling pending the outcome of Obergefell v. Hodges at the U.S. Supreme Court.

=== Guam ===
The Pacific island of Guam was set to be the first U.S. territory to offer legal same-sex marriage after Elizabeth Barrett-Anderson, Guam's attorney general, directed the territorial Department of Public Health and Social Services to begin processing same-sex marriage licenses on April 15, 2015. However, the department director and Governor Eddie Calvo pushed back on Barrett-Anderson's directive, which they said was not binding. In May, the Guam District Court denied territorial officials' request to delay the case until the Supreme Court ruled in Obergefell.

== Obergefell v. Hodges ==
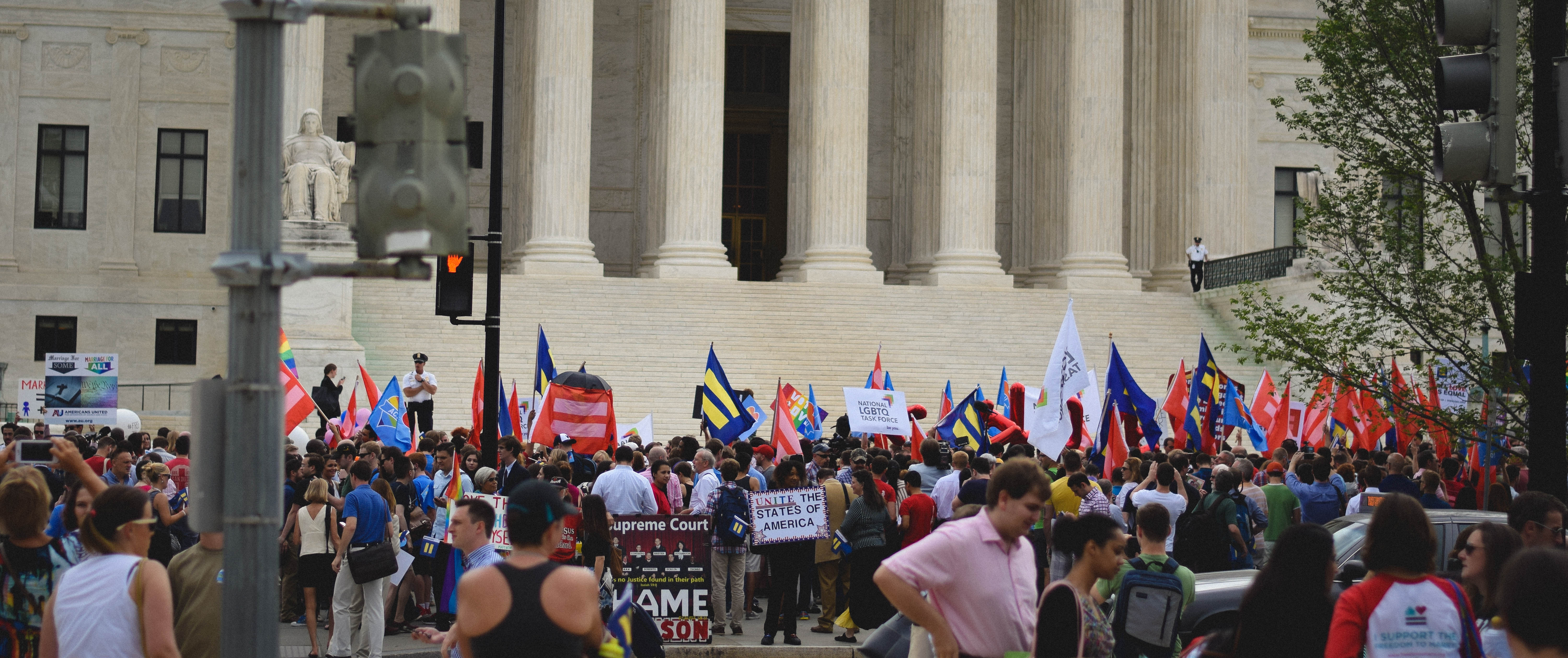
The crowd assembled in front of the Supreme Court shortly before the Court handed down its decision in Obergefell v. Hodges.

Decided on June 26, 2015 in a 5–4 decision, Obergefell requires all states to issue marriage licenses to same-sex couples and to recognize same-sex marriages validly performed in other jurisdictions. This held all state same-sex marriage bans to be unconstitutional and legalized same-sex marriage in all remaining states.

The decision came on the second anniversary of the United States v. Windsor ruling that struck down Section 3 of the Defense of Marriage Act (DOMA), which denied federal recognition of same-sex marriages. It also came on the twelfth anniversary of Lawrence v. Texas which struck down sodomy laws in 13 states. Each justice's opinion on Obergefell was consistent with their opinion in Windsor. In both cases, Justice Kennedy authored the majority opinion and was considered the "swing vote".

== Respect for Marriage Act ==
In December 2022, the final version of the bill Respect for Marriage Act divided American religious groups morally opposed to same-sex marriage; it was supported by some as a suitable compromise between the rights of LGBT couples and religious liberty, a position that was taken by the Church of Jesus Christ of Latter-day Saints, but was prominently opposed by the U.S. Conference of Catholic Bishops and the Southern Baptist Convention due to their views on sexual ethics. Religious groups that supported the bill in support of their LGBT parishioners include the Episcopal Church, the Evangelical Lutheran Church in America, the Union for Reform Judaism, the Reformed Church in America, the United Church of Christ, and the Presbyterian Church (USA).

== See also ==
- Same-sex marriage in the United States
- Timeline of same-sex marriage in the United States
