= Monty Fritts =

American politician (born 1963)

Member of the Tennessee House of Representatives from the 32nd district
- In office January 10, 2023 – November 3, 2026
- Preceded by: Kent Calfee
- Succeeded by: Jack Stockton

Personal details
- Born: December 10, 1963 (age 62) Rockwood, Tennessee, U.S.
- Party: Republican
- Education: Liberty University (BS, MA); University of Tennessee (MBA)
- Website: House website Campaign website

Monty Fritts (born December 10, 1963) is an American politician. A member of the Republican Party, he represented the 32nd district in the Tennessee House of Representatives.

== Education ==
Fritts graduated from Roane County High School in 1982. He holds a BS in business and chemistry and an MA in theological studies from Liberty University. He also has an MBA from the University of Tennessee.

== Career ==
Fritts is an Army veteran and worked in the nuclear industry.

=== Political service ===
In August 2022, Fritts defeated Teresa Pesterfield Kirkham, Keaton Bowman, Donnie Hall and Randy Childs in the Republican primary election for the 32nd district of the Tennessee House of Representatives. In November 2022, he defeated Jan Hahn in the general election. He succeeded Kent Calfee.

On April 5, 2023, weeks after the 2023 Nashville school shooting, he voted to move a bill forward to arm teachers.

On April 11, 2024, Fritts was one of only two house members who voted against bills SB 1917 and HB 2041 that would ban marriage between biological first cousins, calling it a Democratic insult to Tennesseans. The bills were subsequently approved by the House and Senate.

In 2024, Fritts sponsored a state bill (SB 2691) banning geoengineering, which was widely criticised as being influenced by the chemtrails conspiracy theory.

In 2025, Fritts authored HJR 51, which encouraged Tennesseans to join in a non-mandatory time of prayer and intermittent fasting from July 1 to July 31 each year to heal society in response to violence, drug addiction, and family breakdowns.

On September 8, 2025, Fritts announced his candidacy for the Republican nomination in the 2026 Tennessee gubernatorial election.

=== Political positions ===
Fritts advocates for shrinking state government, cutting spending, and ending "corporate welfare". He was one of the several Republicans from rural districts that voted against the private-school voucher program championed by governor Bill Lee in 2025 and 2026. He has pledged to eliminate the program if elected governor.

Fritts criticized state officials for appealing court rulings that could overturn restrictions like the "intent to go armed" law and guns-in-parks prohibition. He supports legal protections for firearms manufacturers to protect them from lawsuits, describing this as a means to boost Tennessee's role as an "arsenal of the Republic".

Fritts has been very critical of the Tennessee Department of Transportation's management of the state highway system, particularly the slow pace of road projects. He also believes that corporate welfare deals in Tennessee have severely siphoned off resources from the state's roads, leading to a decline in their quality.

Fritts campaigns against what he describes as "celebrity politicians" and D.C. elites. He promotes "Godly values" and "creationist worldview". He led the passage of House Joint Resolution 51, encouraging Tennesseans to join in a time of prayer and intermittent fasting from July 1 to July 31 each year.

In January 2026, Fritts gained national attention for calling for the execution of the parents of transgender children. Fritts stated: "I think that anyone who would try to disfigure a child through hormones or surgery, you might be eligible to capital punishment."

Fritts self-identifies as a Christian nationalist. In May 2026, Fritts again gained attention for saying he would like to ban the beliefs of Islam, along with Buddhism, Hinduism, and "other pagan religions," from being practiced in the state of Tennessee. He also stated he would outlaw same-sex marriage and criminalize some sexual acts between consenting adults of the same sex. Fritts additionally said he would criminalize abortion in all cases, including pregnancies resulting from rape, and compared the punishment to that given to murderers. He also said he opposes allowing rape victims access to the morning-after pill. In late July 2026, he stood by his previous statements and pledged to ban mosques and "other non-Christian religions" if elected governor. He also argued that the First Amendment does not apply to state governments.
