= Kent Calfee =

American politician (born 1949)

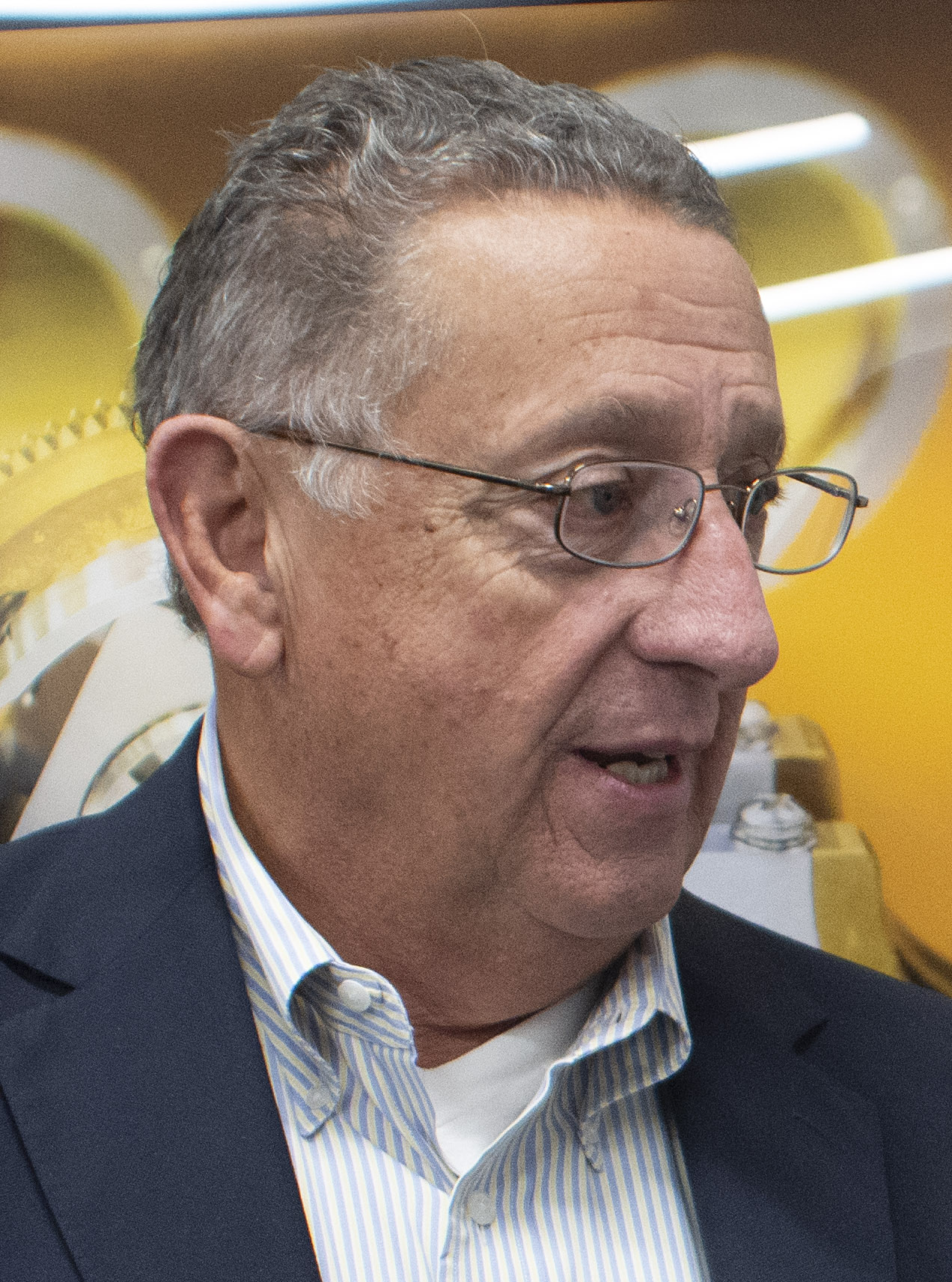
- Calfee in 2018

Member of the Tennessee House of Representatives from the 32nd district
- In office January 8, 2013 – January 10, 2023
- Preceded by: Julia Hurley
- Succeeded by: Monty Fritts

Personal details
- Born: May 15, 1949 (age 77)
- Party: Republican
- Children: 4
- Education: East Tennessee State University
- Website: House website

Kent Calfee (born May 15, 1949) is an American politician and former Republican member of the Tennessee House of Representatives representing District 32 from 2013 to 2023.

A picture of him drinking water out of a Hershey's Syrup bottle went viral in 2020. When asked about it, he said he wasn't going to pay for a water bottle that he would probably end up losing.

== Education ==
Calfee attended East Tennessee State University.

== Elections ==
2012 Calfee challenged District 32 Representative Julia Hurley in the August 2, 2012 Republican Primary, winning with 4,611 votes (55.4%), and won the November 6, 2012 General election with 16,447 votes (69.5%) against Democratic nominee Jack McNew and Independent candidate Allen Cole.
