= Dennis Ferguson (politician) =

American politician (born 1961)

Member of the Tennessee House of Representatives from the 32nd district
- In office 1991–2010
- Preceded by: Jim Henry
- Succeeded by: Julia Hurley

Personal details
- Born: October 2, 1961 (age 65)
- Party: Democratic

Dennis J. Ferguson (born October 2, 1961) is a former Democratic member of the Tennessee House of Representatives. He represented the 32nd District including Roane County and Lenoir City, Tennessee. Ferguson was first elected to the Tennessee State House of Representatives in 1991. He served as Minority Floor Leader and Democratic Whip. Ferguson built and then later sold All-Star Promotions, which is still in business today. Ferguson graduated from the Harriman School System in 1980. Ferguson was unseated by newcomer Julia Hurley in 2010 by a vote of 8,833 to 7,834. During the campaign, Hurley's previous employment as a Hooters waitress was criticized, but she defended herself by stating that she wouldn't be the same person without that experience. In a September 2010 debate against Hurley, Ferguson claimed that "during that time as your state representative, I've never missed a day. I've got a 100-percent attendance record. I'm proud of that." Ferguson operates a non-profit under his name sake "DENNIS FERGUSON FISHING RODEO FOR KIDS, INC."
