= Julia Hurley (politician) =

American politician (born 1981)

Julia C. Hurley
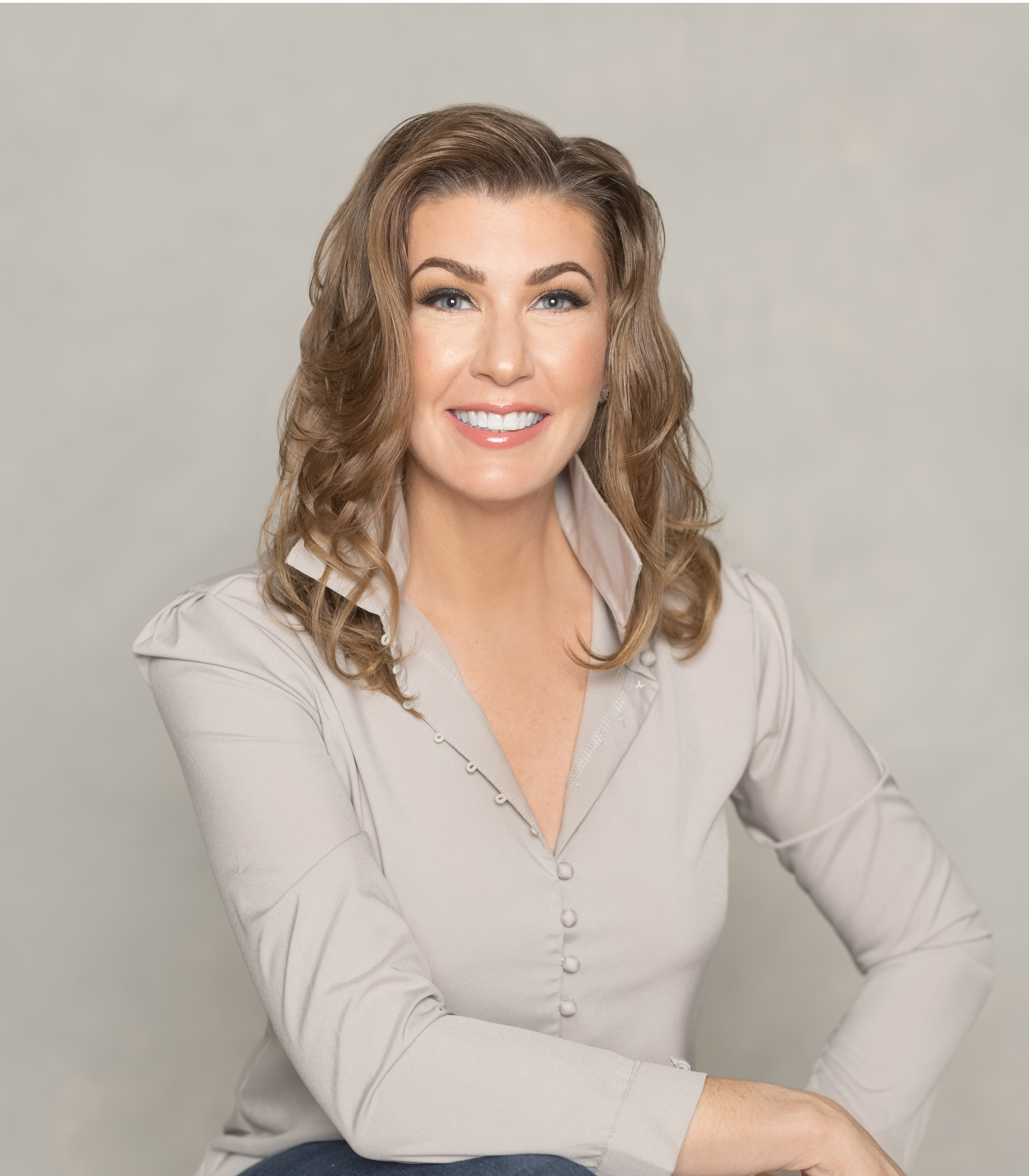
- Hurley in 2021

Member of the Tennessee House of Representatives from the 32nd district
- In office January 11, 2011 – January 8, 2013
- Preceded by: Dennis Ferguson
- Succeeded by: Kent Calfee

Personal details
- Born: September 28, 1981 (age 45) Knoxville, Tennessee, U.S.
- Party: Republican
- Spouse: Joe Hutchison
- Children: 1
- Education: Maryville College
- Website: House website

Julia Cheyanne Hurley (born September 28, 1981) is an American politician, real estate agent, and businesswoman who served as the former member of the Tennessee House of Representatives representing the 32nd district from 2010 to 2012.

== Biography ==
Hurley is a Lenoir City native. She went to college at Maryville College where she founded the Maryville College Republicans Club along with Congressman Jimmy Duncan Jr., graduating in 2003.

Hurley previously owned The JaCy Company, which housed SECGrillToppers, a sports licensing/product company. Hurley also worked for the RMD Corporation, owners of Hooters in Alcoa, Tennessee, before transferring to the Knoxville Hooters store on Kingston Pike from 2001 to 2004.

During her campaign for the Tennessee House, Hurley's Hooters experience was criticized, but she defended herself by stating that she wouldn't be the same person without that experience.

Hurley was the Influencing investor at the Lenoir City, TN Keller Williams Real Estate offices. Hurley is the CEO of JustHomesGroup, founded in 2014.

== Political career ==
Hurley defeated 18-year Democratic incumbent Dennis Ferguson in 2010 by a vote of 8,833 to 7,834.

In the General Assembly in 2012, Hurley joined with Tennessee Senator Stacey Campfield in sponsoring successful Drug Testing for TANF legislation, commonly known as drug testing for welfare. Hurley opposed Amendment No. 6 to HB2725 by Rep. Johnny Shaw that would have established drug testing of the elected members of the Tennessee General Assembly.

Hurley sought re-election in 2012, but lost the August 2, 2012, Republican primary to Kent Calfee. Calfee received 4,609 votes to Hurley's 3,704 votes. He went on to win the general election in November 2012. Since leaving the state legislature, Hurley has contributed some columns to the Knoxville News Sentinel.

Hurley went on to be elected to the Tennessee State Executive Committee in 2014, serving in State Senate District five until 2018. Hurley was unopposed and received 5,670 votes. Hurley proposed a State Party rules change that was adopted in 2018.

In 2018, Hurley defeated 32-year Democratic Incumbent, Earlena Maples for Loudon County Commission District 2, Seat A, winning with 643 votes against Maples with 615. In 2020, she announced moving out of the Loudon County, which led to legal actions aiming to remove her from office. The case was dismissed in December 2021.

During her legislation, Hurley sponsored 36 bills and co-sponsored 121 bills, being Victims' Rights (HB0396) and Education (HB2229) the most important bills.

== Personal life ==
Hurley is the mother of one child, a daughter, who was born circa 1997, when Hurley was a teenager. Hurley opposes abortion and has stated that she "was faced with the choice of abortion or birth" and "chose life".
