= Fair Wisconsin =

US political advocacy organization

- Predecessor: Equality Wisconsin Center Advocates
- Formation: 1994
- Type: 501(c)() nonprofit
- Headquarters: Madison, Wisconsin
- Executive Director: Abigail Swetz
- Key people: U.S. Senator Tammy Baldwin R. Richard Wagner
- Affiliations: Fair Wisconsin Education Fund Fair Wisconsin Political Action Committee (PAC)
- Website: https://fairwisconsin.com

Fair Wisconsin, previously called Equality Wisconsin is a 501(c)(4) nonprofit civil rights political advocacy organization dedicated to securing equal rights under the law for Wisconsin's LGBTQ+, transgender and non-binary community. The organization focuses on expanding rights for LGBTQ+ and transgender Wisconsinites, most notably working to enshrine same sex marriage protections, HIV/Aids Advocacy and adding gender identity to the states non-discrimination laws. The organization was founded in 1994 as LGBT Center Advocates, consolidating elements of the Domestic Partnership Task Force, the Human Rights League, and the LGBT Alliance for Equality. The organization claims several accomplishments in areas of domestic partner recognition, non-discrimination protections, and securing greater resources for LGBTQ+ social services.

== Structure ==
Fair Wisconsin comprises three organizations: Fair Wisconsin Inc. is a 501c4 organization and handles their lobbying and legislative advocacy. Fair Wisconsin Political Action Committee (PAC), is their state political action committee and endorses champions for LGBTQ+ equality. The Fair Wisconsin Education Fund is a 501c3 nonprofit dedicated to education surrounding LGBTQ+ issues in Wisconsin.

Fair Wisconsin is a member of Community Shares of Wisconsin and the Equality Federation.

== History ==
During the first years of its existence, the organization was affiliated with the Milwaukee LGBT Community Center. It grew dramatically from 2004 to 2005 in preparation to oppose a constitutional ban on civil unions and marriages for same-sex partners, with efforts to organize clergy against the ban and persuade voters in door-to-door canvassing. Center Advocates worked with Madison-based Action Wisconsin to organize against the ban from 2004 to 2005, formalizing one unified campaign known as Fair Wisconsin in early 2006. However, the constitutional ban passed in November 2006.

In 2007, Center Advocates advocated for domestic partner benefits for Milwaukee Public Schools employees, and additional nondiscrimination protections for transgender people in the City of Milwaukee.

Center Advocates became an independent advocacy organization in 2008, and in June 2009 its members voted to change the agency's name to Equality Wisconsin. A charitable arm, Equality Wisconsin Fund, was established in 2008.

In 2009, Equality Wisconsin supported Governor Jim Doyle's domestic partner proposals in the state budget, and sought to educate the public about the new provisions available to gay and lesbian couples. Educational efforts in religious communities and Milwaukee's Latino community were also ongoing in 2009.

In 2013 Equality Wisconsin merged with its Madison counterpart, Fair Wisconsin. The organization is now called Fair Wisconsin and is based in Madison.

From 2018-2022 Fair Wisconsin Worked with Governor Tony Evers admonition to draft several executive orders, including Executive Order #1 to include nondiscrimination protections for state employees and contractors on the basis of sexual orientation and gender identity. As well as Executive Order #121 and #122 which prohibit the use of federal and state funds for the purpose of conversion therapy and require the use of gender neutral language in state documents.

In 2024, Fair Wisconsin's long time Executive Director Megin McDonell stepped down and the Boards of Directors conduced a national search, hiring the former Communications Director of the Department of Public Instruction, Abigail Swetz.

== Programs ==
=== Legislative advocacy ===
Fair Wisconsin works to advance, achieve and protect the civil rights of LGBTQ+ Wisconsinites though a wide range of legislative advocacy. Fair Wisconsin is a registered lobbyist. Since 2021 Fair Wisconsin has been working to oppose the growing anti-LGBTQ+ movement in Wisconsin. In 2023 Fair Wisconsin submitted more than 15,000 pages of testimony in opposition a transgender medical care ban introduced by republicans in the state legislature. The transgender medical care ban was vetoed by Wisconsin Governor Tony Evers on December 6, 2023.

In 2024 Fair Wisconsin and other advocacy organizations filed complaints against several schools alleging violation of Title IX regulations.

=== Electoral advocacy ===
Fair Wisconsin has run significant independent expenditures on behalf of candidates since its founding. Fair Wisconsin's most notable electoral involvement occurred during the 2004 marriage amendment campaign in Wisconsin. Since the 2020 presidential election, Fair Wisconsin has expanded their electoral advocacy programs. The Fair Wisconsin Political Action Committee (PAC) endorses both LGBTQ+ candidates and their allies, Fair Wisconsin PAC's notable endorsements include, Vice President Kamala Harris and Governor Tim Walz, U.S. Senator Tammy Baldwin, U.S. Congressman Mark Pocan, Governor Tony Evers, Mandela Barnes for U.S. Senate and Dina Nina Martinez Rutherford.

== See also ==
- Recognition of same-sex unions in Wisconsin
- LGBTQ Rights in Wisconsin
