= Same-sex marriage in Wisconsin =

Same-sex marriage has been legally recognized in Wisconsin since October 6, 2014, upon the resolution of a lawsuit challenging the state's ban on same-sex marriage. On October 6, the U.S. Supreme Court refused to hear an appeal of an appellate court ruling in Wolf v. Walker that had found Wisconsin's ban on same-sex marriage unconstitutional. The appellate court issued its order prohibiting enforcement of the state's ban on same-sex marriage the next day, and counties began issuing marriage licenses to same-sex couples immediately. Polling suggests that a majority of Wisconsin residents support the legal recognition of same-sex marriage, with a 2022 poll showing that 72% of respondents supported same-sex marriage. Wisconsin had previously recognized domestic partnerships, which afforded limited legal rights to same-sex couples, from August 2009 until they were discontinued in April 2018.

The Constitution of Wisconsin had precluded state recognition of same-sex marriages and prohibited the establishment of any similar legal status under another name since 2006, when 59% of voters ratified a constitutional amendment defining marriage so as to exclude same-sex couples. A federal lawsuit filed in February 2014, Wolf v. Walker, challenged Wisconsin's refusal to grant marriage licenses to same-sex couples, its refusal to recognize same-sex marriages established in other jurisdictions, and related statutes. In June 2014, Judge Barbara Brandriff Crabb of the U.S. District Court for the Western District of Wisconsin ruled for the plaintiffs and in the week before she stayed her decision county clerks in 60 of the state's 72 counties issued marriage licenses to same-sex couples and some performed marriage ceremonies for them. The state appealed her decision to the Seventh Circuit Court of Appeals, which affirmed it on September 4 but later stayed implementation of its ruling until the U.S. Supreme Court decided whether to consider the case.

== Domestic partnerships ==
Domestic partnerships in Wisconsin afforded limited rights to same-sex couples. A domestic partnership law took effect on August 3, 2009, and provided select rights, such as the ability to inherit a partner's estate in the absence of a will, hospital and jail visitation, and the ability to access family medical leave to care for a sick partner. The law was upheld by the Wisconsin Supreme Court in Appling v. Walker on July 31, 2014. Domestic partnerships were discontinued on April 1, 2018 following the legalization of same-sex marriage in Wisconsin.

By June 2017, about 4,400 couples had registered a domestic partnership in Wisconsin, with 78% of these being opposite-sex couples.

== Same-sex marriage ==
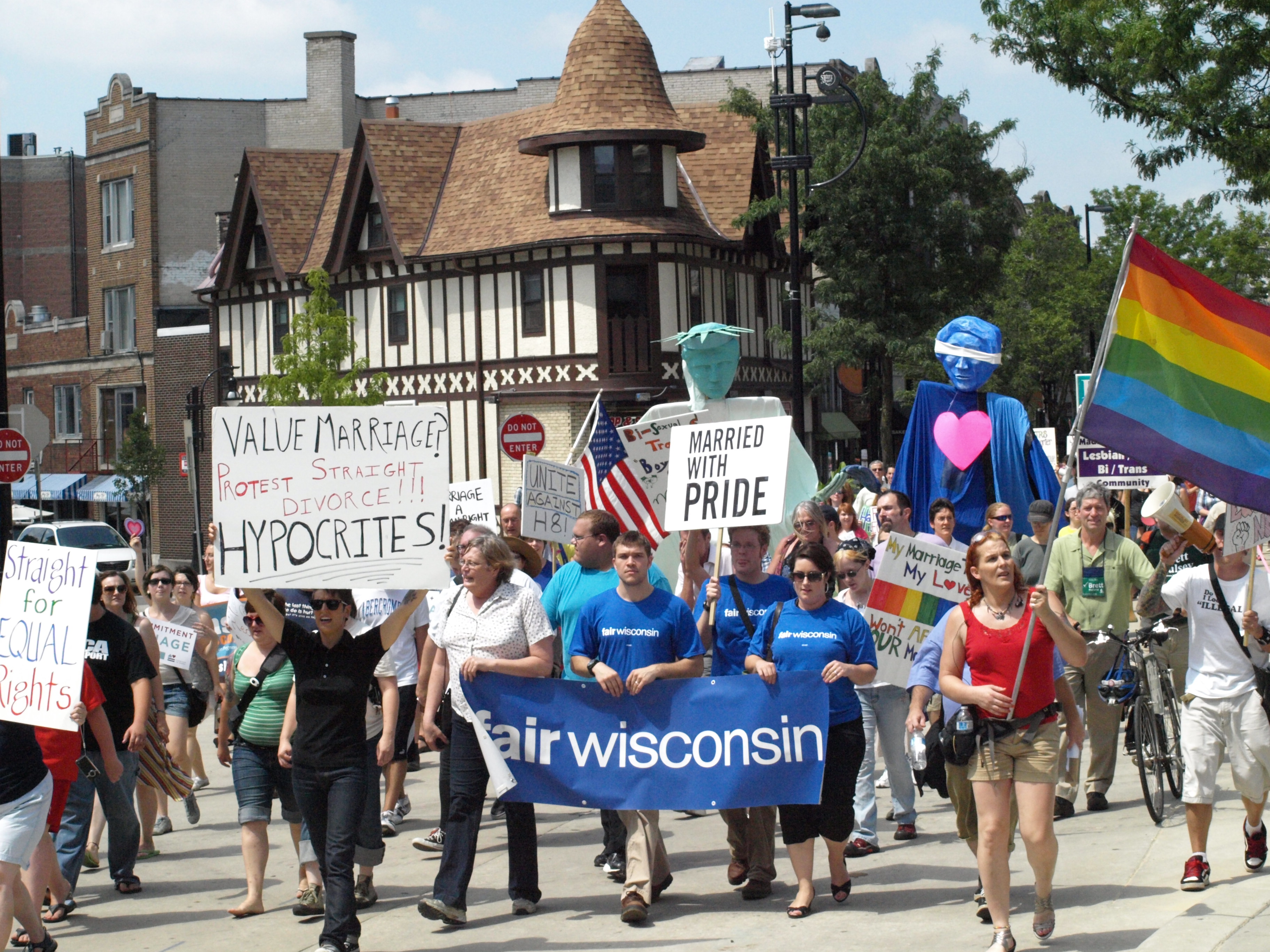
Protest in favor of same-sex marriage in Madison, July 2010

=== Statutes ===
Prior to July 20, 1979, same-sex marriage was neither recognized nor prohibited in Wisconsin. In 1979, the Wisconsin Senate and State Assembly passed a bill that defined marriage as "a civil contract, to which the consent of the parties capable in law of contracting is essential, and which creates the legal status of husband and wife." The bill was signed into law by Governor Lee S. Dreyfus, and took effect on July 20, 1979. A bill that the Family Research Institute (FRI) called a "statutory endorsement of traditional marriage" was proposed in the Wisconsin Legislature in 1997, one year after passage of the federal Defense of Marriage Act (DOMA), which banned federal recognition of same-sex marriages. The proposal passed the Assembly on a 78–20 vote, but the Senate took no action before adjourning sine die. Legislation in support of same-sex marriage was also proposed that year, but was not voted on by either chamber.

A bill banning same-sex marriage was introduced to the Assembly on August 17, 2003, and approved on a vote of 68–29 on October 23. The Senate passed the bill by a vote of 22–10 on November 5. Governor Jim Doyle vetoed the legislation on November 10, and the Assembly failed to override Doyle's veto by one vote, 63–33, on November 12. Wisconsin also has a marriage evasion law, which established criminal penalties of up to nine months' imprisonment and a fine up to $10,000 for leaving the state to contract a marriage that would not be valid in the state. According to a spokesperson for Lambda Legal in 2008, several states had similar laws, but Wisconsin's provided the harshest penalties. The applicability of the law to same-sex marriages was disputed, since it was designed to prevent fraud on the part of someone too young to marry legally in Wisconsin.

A bill to repeal the statutory ban on same-sex marriage and incorporate gender-neutral language throughout Wisconsin statutes failed to pass in March 2026.

=== Constitutional amendment ===
On March 5, 2004, the Assembly approved a state constitutional amendment to the Constitution of Wisconsin by a vote of 68–27, that read:

Only a marriage between one man and one woman shall be valid or recognized as a marriage in this state. A legal status identical or substantially similar to that of marriage for unmarried individuals shall not be valid or recognized in this state.

The Senate approved the same language by a 20–13 vote on March 12, completing the first of two legislative approvals required to place the amendment on the ballot. The Senate approved the proposed amendment again on December 6, 2005, voting 19–14 along party lines. The Assembly did the same on February 28, 2006, by a vote of 62–31. The question appeared as a referendum on the statewide ballot for the 2006 general election on November 7, 2006, and voters approved it by a margin of 59.4% to 40.6%. Subsequently, William McConkey, a political science instructor, filed a lawsuit, McConkey v. Van Hollen, on April 9, 2009, with the Wisconsin Supreme Court, charging that the 2006 referendum, violated the State Constitution because it proposed more than one question in a single ballot proposal, which is illegal under Wisconsin law. On May 14, the court agreed to hear the case, specifying two questions, whether McConkey, as an individual voter, had standing to sue and whether the ballot initiative presented two questions. Attorney General J. B. Van Hollen challenged McConkey's standing. The court heard oral arguments on November 3. On June 30, 2010, the Wisconsin Supreme Court ruled 7–0 in McConkey that the ballot measure was proper.

In December 2023, senators Tim Carpenter and Mark Spreitzer announced their intention to file a constitutional amendment to repeal the ban and make appropriate changes in statutory law. "One of the worst days in the Legislature was when that constitutional amendment passed in 2006, and some of my colleagues came up to me afterwards and said, 'Don't take it personal'. It's been personal, and it's been in our constitution for about 17 years and it's time to repeal it. It's time to pass a constitutional amendment that brings back a person's civil rights", said Carpenter. A similar measure was introduced in June 2025, though died in the Assembly in March 2026.

=== Lawsuits ===
Same-sex marriage in the United States

==== Early cases ====
In 1971, Donna Burkett and Manonia Evans, an African American lesbian couple from Milwaukee, filed a lawsuit in the U.S. District Court for the Eastern District of Wisconsin against the Milwaukee County Clerk, Thomas Zablocki, for refusing to issue them a marriage license. The couple sought "an order compelling the clerk of Milwaukee County to issue them an application for a marriage license." Zablocki moved to dismiss the suit. The plaintiffs failed to submit timely briefs in response to the clerk's motion, and the court dismissed the case in 1972.

On April 16, 2014, a lesbian couple married in California sought original jurisdiction in the Wisconsin Supreme Court. They claimed the state's "parallel civil marriage and domestic partnership structure" denied them access to federal benefits. They also challenged Wisconsin's statute imposing criminal penalties on residents who contracted in other jurisdictions a marriage that was not recognized by the state. On May 27, 2014, the Wisconsin Supreme Court, on a 5–2 vote, declined to hear the case.

==== Wolf v. Walker ====
On February 3, 2014, the American Civil Liberties Union (ACLU) and the law firm Mayer Brown filed a lawsuit in the U.S. District Court for the Western District of Wisconsin on behalf of four same-sex couples, including a lesbian couple married in Minnesota in 2013. It challenged the State Constitution's denial of marriage rights to same-sex couples and the state statute that provided criminal penalties for leaving the state to establish a marriage that was not valid in Wisconsin. The suit named Governor Scott Walker, several state officials, and two county clerks as defendants. The case was assigned to U.S. District Judge Barbara Brandriff Crabb, who ruled on June 6, 2014 that the state's constitutional and statutory restrictions on same-sex marriage interfered with the fundamental right to marry, violating the Due Process Clause of the U.S. Constitution, and discriminated on the basis of sexual orientation, violating the Equal Protection Clause. In response to the decision, though Crabb had yet to issue any order enforcing it, county clerks in increasing numbers began issuing marriage licenses to same-sex couples and in some cases performing marriage ceremonies for them. Renee Currie and Shari Roll were the first couple to be issued a license in Madison, and were married minutes later just a few blocks away from the Wisconsin State Capitol. The Milwaukee County Executive, Chris Abele, said he would keep the courthouse open until 9 p.m. so same-sex couples could be issued marriage licenses. On June 13, after a week of legal maneuvering and a threat of legal action against the clerks on the part of Attorney General J. B. Van Hollen, Crabb stayed enforcement of her decision while expressing disappointment that recent action by the U.S. Supreme Court in the Utah case of Kitchen v. Herbert compelled her to do so.

On July 10, the state appealed the decision to the Seventh Circuit Court of Appeals, which combined the case for briefing with a similar Indiana case, Baskin v. Bogan, and scheduled oral arguments for August 26. On September 4, the Seventh Circuit, in a unanimous opinion authored by Judge Richard Posner, upheld the district court decision. Posner wrote:

The challenged laws discriminate against a minority defined by an immutable characteristic, and the only rationale that the states put forth with any conviction–that same-sex couples and their children don't need marriage because same-sex couples can't produce children, intended or unintended–is so full of holes that it cannot be taken seriously. To the extent that children are better off in families in which the parents are married, they are better off whether they are raised by their biological parents or by adoptive parents.

On September 9, Van Hollen asked the U.S. Supreme Court to consider the case. The Seventh Circuit stayed enforcement of its ruling on September 18. On October 6, 2014, the Supreme Court denied review of this case, allowing the Seventh Circuit's ruling to take effect. Van Hollen responded by stating, "the Seventh Circuit affirmed the District Court's decision holding Wisconsin's Marriage Protection Amendment unconstitutional, and the Supreme Court has declined the opportunity to examine that decision. It is now our obligation to comply with those court decisions." Governor Walker also instructed county clerks to comply and issue marriage licenses to same-sex couples. Same-sex couples began marrying in Wisconsin the following day, Tuesday, October 7, 2014, after the Seventh Circuit and the District Court issued their mandates.

On June 26, 2015, the U.S. Supreme Court ruled 5–4 in Obergefell v. Hodges that state bans on same-sex marriage violate the Fourteenth Amendment, thus invalidating all remaining state same-sex marriage bans in the United States. Governor Walker said the ruling was a "grave mistake" and called for a federal constitutional amendment banning same-sex marriage, "The only alternative left for the American people is to support an amendment to the U.S. Constitution to reaffirm the ability of the states to continue to define marriage." Jerome E. Listecki, the Archbishop of Milwaukee, called it "a sad day for the sacrament of marriage". Karen Gotzler, the executive director of the Milwaukee LGBT Community Center, welcomed the court decision, "It's really a joyous day for us." Joseph Czarnezki, the Milwaukee County Clerk, said "We're expecting an influx of people, same-sex couples, who desire to get married. I've talked to people in the community who said they are specifically waiting for the Supreme Court ruling so that their marriage would be legal in all 50 states."

=== Native American nations ===
The Indian Civil Rights Act primarily aims to protect the rights of Native Americans but also reinforces the principle of tribal self-governance. While it does not grant sovereignty, the Act affirms the authority of tribes to govern their own legal affairs. Consequently, many tribes have enacted their own marriage and family laws. As a result, the Wolf ruling and the Supreme Court's Obergefell ruling did not automatically apply to tribal jurisdictions. Same-sex marriage is legal on the reservations of the Ho-Chunk Nation of Wisconsin, which legalized same-sex marriage when the Ho-Chunk Nation Legislature voted 13–0 on June 5, 2017 to approve a bill allowing same-sex couples to marry, the Lac du Flambeau Band of Lake Superior Chippewa, where state law governs marriage relations, the Menominee Indian Tribe of Wisconsin, the Oneida Nation of Wisconsin, and the Stockbridge–Munsee Community. The Menominee Tribal Council voted 6–0 on November 3, 2016 to legalize same-sex marriage. The Tribal Code now reads: "'Marriage' is a civil contract between two (2) persons, regardless of their sex, creating a union to the exclusion of all others." The tribal Licensing and Permit Department will issue a marriage license (Menominee: ni wāwīhtamatwan) "upon receiving a completed application form from two unmarried persons, regardless of sex (or gender), and in the absence of any showing that the proposed marriage would be invalid under any provisions of this code." The General Tribal Council of the Oneida Nation modified its code of laws, effective on June 10, 2015, to define marriage as "the civil contract to which the consent of the parties capable in law of contracting is essential, and which creates the legal status of spouses". Similarly, the Stockbridge-Munsee Marriage Code has defined marriage as "a civil contract between two (2) persons, regardless of their sex, creating a union to the exclusion of all others" since February 22, 2016. Marriage licenses are issued by the Tribal Court, located at the Council Building (Mohican: Peʔpootuwothut; Delaware: Aachimulsikaon).

Native Americans have deep-rooted marriage traditions, placing a strong emphasis on community, family and spiritual connections. Traditional Native American law does not address same-sex unions. For instance, the Great Law of Peace (Oneida: Kayanlʌhslaˀkó) is silent on the issue, only stating that members of the same clan are forbidden to marry. While there are no records of same-sex marriages being performed in Native American cultures in the way they are commonly defined in Western legal systems, many Indigenous communities recognize identities and relationships that may be placed on the LGBT spectrum. Among these are two-spirit individuals—people who embody both masculine and feminine qualities. In some cultures, two-spirit individuals assigned male at birth wear women's clothing and engage in household and artistic work associated with the feminine sphere. Historically, this identity sometimes allowed for unions between two people of the same biological sex. Among the Ho-Chunk, two-spirit people—known as teją́cowįga (pronounced [teˈdʒãtʃowĩga])—are believed to have been blessed by the spirit of the Moon, and are "holy and highly respected for special gifts such as prophesy, healing, artistry, and excelling at women's tasks". Many teją́cowįga married cisgender men without indication of polygyny. Other nations also have distinct terms and respected roles for two-spirit people. The Ojibwe refer to them as niizh manidoowag (pronounced [niːʒ maˈnɪˌdoːˌwak]), many of whom were wives in polygynous households. The Potawatomi use the term mnedokwé (pronounced [mnədoˈkʷɛ], plural: mnedokwék). Traditionally, they "sought out female company" from an early age, possessed the "work skills" of both sexes, "talked like women", and were regarded as "esteemed persons with special spiritual powers". Ruth Landes reported in 1970 that they were "said to possess visions…but not to practice sorcery. [Mnedokwék] exemplified a distinct category of 'power'."

=== Demographics and marriage statistics ===
Data from the 2000 U.S. census showed that 8,232 same-sex couples were living in Wisconsin. By 2005, this had increased to 14,894 couples, likely attributed to same-sex couples' growing willingness to disclose their partnerships on government surveys. Same-sex couples lived in all counties of the state, and constituted 0.7% of coupled households and 0.4% of all households in the state. Most couples lived in Milwaukee, Dane and Waukesha counties, but the counties with the highest percentage of same-sex couples were Dane (0.80% of all county households) and Sawyer (0.78%). Same-sex partners in Wisconsin were on average younger than opposite-sex partners, and more likely to be employed. However, the average and median household incomes of same-sex couples were lower than different-sex couples, and same-sex couples were also far less likely to own a home than opposite-sex partners. 16% of same-sex couples in Wisconsin were raising children under the age of 18, with an estimated 3,783 children living in households headed by same-sex couples in 2005.

The 2020 U.S. census showed that there were 8,310 married same-sex couple households (3,251 male couples and 5,059 female couples) and 7,800 unmarried same-sex couple households in Wisconsin.

== Public opinion ==
Public opinion for same-sex marriage in Wisconsin
Poll source	Dates administered	Sample size	Margin of error	Support	Opposition	Do not know / refused
Public Religion Research Institute	February 28 – December 8, 2025	456 adults	?	70%	28%	2%
Public Religion Research Institute	March 13 – December 2, 2024	574 adults	?	75%	23%	2%
Public Religion Research Institute	March 9 – December 7, 2023	494 adults	?	73%	25%	2%
Public Religion Research Institute	March 11 – December 14, 2022	?	?	72%	26%	2%
Marquette University	April 19–24, 2022	805 registered voters	± 4.1%	72%	19%	9%
Public Religion Research Institute	March 8 – November 9, 2021	?	?	73%	26%	1%
Public Religion Research Institute	January 7 – December 20, 2020	823 adults	?	71%	27%	2%
Marquette University	February 19–23, 2020	1,000 registered voters	± 3.6%	68%	25%	7%
Public Religion Research Institute	January 4 – December 30, 2017	1,522 adults	?	66%	26%	8%
Public Religion Research Institute	May 18, 2016 – January 10, 2017	784 adults	?	63%	29%	8%
Marquette University	June 9–12, 2016	800 registered voters	± 4.4%	64%	28%	8%
Public Religion Research Institute	April 29, 2015 – January 7, 2016	640 adults	?	55%	36%	9%
Public Religion Research Institute	April 2, 2014 – January 4, 2015	1,201 adults	?	59%	33%	8%
Marquette University	October 23–26, 2014	1,164 likely voters	± 3.0%	55%	35%	10%
Marquette University	October 23–26, 2014	1,409 registered voters	± 2.7%	56%	34%	10%
Marquette University	October 9–12, 2014	803 likely voters	± 3.5%	63%	30%	7%
Marquette University	October 9–12, 2014	1,004 registered voters	± 3.2%	64%	30%	6%
Marquette University	May 15–18, 2014	805 registered voters	± 3.5%	55%	37%	8%
Public Policy Polling	April 17–20, 2014	1,144 registered voters	± 2.9%	47%	45%	8%
Marquette University	October 21–24, 2013	400 registered voters	± 5.0%	53%	43%	4%
Public Policy Polling	February 21–24, 2013	1,799 voters	± 2.3%	44%	46%	10%
Marquette University	October 25–28, 2012	1,243 likely voters	± 2.8%	44%	51%	5%
Marquette University	October 25–28, 2012	1,404 registered voters	± 2.7%	44%	51%	5%
Public Policy Polling	July 5–8, 2012	1,057 voters	± 3.0%	43%	47%	10%
Public Policy Polling	August 12–14, 2011	830 voters	± 3.4%	39%	50%	11%

The April 2014 Public Policy Polling (PPP) survey found that 47% of Wisconsin voters thought same-sex marriage should be legal, while 45% thought it should be illegal and 8% were not sure. A separate question on the same survey found that 71% of Wisconsin voters supported the legal recognition of same-sex couples, with 43% supporting same-sex marriage, 28% supporting civil unions but not marriage, 26% favoring no legal recognition and 3% being unsure. In August 2011, the PPP placed support for same-sex marriage at 34%, civil unions but not marriage at 33%, no legal recognition at 31%, and no opinion at 2%. In July 2012, it placed support for same-sex marriage at 39%, civil unions but not marriage at 30%, no legal recognition at 28%, and no opinion at 3%.

== See also ==
- LGBT rights in Wisconsin
- Domestic partnerships in Wisconsin
- Same-sex marriage in the United States
