= Wolf v. Walker =

US federal case on same-sex marriage

- No. 14-2526
- Court: United States Court of Appeals for the Seventh Circuit
- Full case name: Virginia Wolf, et al., Plaintiffs, v. Scott Walker, et al., Defendants.
- Argued: August 26, 2014
- Decided: September 4, 2014
- Citation: 766 F.3d 648

Case history
- Prior actions: District Court (W.D. Wis) June 13, 2014: Stay ordered, 2014 WL 2693963. June 6, 2014: Plaintiff same-sex couples' motion for declaratory and injunctive relief granted, 986 F. Supp. 2d 982.
- Subsequent actions: U.S. Supreme Court October 6, 2014: Petition for writ of certiorari denied, 2014 WL 4425163, 83 USLW 3102.
- Related actions: Court of Appeals (7th Cir.) July 11, 2014: Consolidated for argument with Baskin v. Bogan, No. 14-2386.

Holding
- The district court's decision invalidating Wisconsin's same-sex marriage ban is affirmed.

Court membership
- Judges sitting: Richard Posner, David Hamilton, Ann Claire Williams.

Keywords
- Same-sex marriage

Wolf v. Walker is a federal lawsuit filed in February 2014 that challenged Wisconsin's refusal to grant marriage licenses to same-sex couples, its refusal to recognize same-sex marriages established in other jurisdictions, and related statutes. In June 2014, Judge Barbara Crabb of the U.S. District Court for the Western District of Wisconsin ruled for the plaintiffs. In the week before she stayed her decision, county clerks in 60 of the state's 72 counties issued marriage licenses to same-sex couples and some performed marriage ceremonies for them. The state appealed her decision to the Seventh Circuit Court of Appeals, which affirmed her opinion in a unanimous decision on September 4. The state requested a writ of certiorari from the U.S. Supreme Court, which was denied on October 6. Same-sex marriages resumed after the Seventh Circuit issued its mandate the next day.

== Filing ==
On February 3, 2014, the American Civil Liberties Union (ACLU) and the law firm of Mayer Brown filed a lawsuit in U.S. District Court for the Western District of Wisconsin on behalf of four same-sex couples, including a lesbian couple married in Minnesota in 2013. It challenged the state constitution's ban on same-sex marriage as well as Wisconsin's marriage evasion law, which makes it a crime to leave the state to establish a marriage that is not valid in Wisconsin punishable with up to nine months in jail and a fine of as much as $10,000. The suit named Governor Scott Walker, several state officials, and two county clerks as defendants.

The case was assigned to U.S. District Judge Barbara Brandriff Crabb, who scheduled a hearing for March 27. The two county clerks named as defendants supported the plaintiffs' position. District attorneys in Milwaukee and Eau Claire counties agreed not to prosecute the plaintiffs under the marriage evasion law. Prompted by Judge Crabb, who noted that several rulings against state bans of same-sex marriage in other jurisdictions had been stayed, on March 12 the plaintiffs withdrew their request for injunctions against the state's enforcement of both its ban on same-sex marriage and the marriage evasion law, and asked the court to set an expedited schedule.

== District court ruling ==
On June 6, 2014, Crabb concluded that the state's constitutional and legislative ban on same-sex marriage interferes with the fundamental right to marry, violating the Due Process Clause of the Constitution of the United States, and discriminates on the basis of sexual orientation, violating the Equal Protection Clause.

Crabb concluded that "sexual-orientation discrimination is subject to heightened scrutiny" under the equal protection clause based on four factors used by the United States Supreme Court: (1) a history of discrimination, (2) an ability to "contribute to society to the same extent as others", (3) sexual orientation is immutable in the sense that "the law may not require someone to change his or her sexual orientation" and that it is "fundamental to a person's identity", and (4) being politically powerless in the sense of an "inherent vulnerab[ility] in the context of the ordinary political process, either because of...size or history of disenfranchisement." Crabb stated that the state's same-sex marriage ban must be substantially related to an important governmental objective to survive heightened scrutiny, specifically intermediate scrutiny.

The important government interests argued by the state were: "(1) preserving tradition; (2) encouraging procreation generally and 'responsible' procreation in particular; (3) providing an environment for 'optimal child rearing'; (4) protecting the institution of marriage; (5) proceeding with caution; and (6) helping to maintain other legal restrictions on marriage."

The state had argued that, "[t]he traditional view of marriage—between a man and woman...—has been recognized for millennia." Crabb stated, "the most 'traditional' form of marriage has not been between one man and one woman, but between one man and multiple women, which presumably is not a tradition that defendants and amici would like to continue...Similarly, women were deprived of many opportunities, including the right to vote, for much of this country's history, often because of 'traditional' beliefs about women's abilities...With respect to marriage in particular, there was a time when 'the very being or legal existence of [a] woman [was] suspended' when she married," referring to coverture.

== Reaction ==
Although the ruling did not immediately issue an injunction directing state officials to stop enforcing the ban, clerks in the state's largest two counties, Milwaukee and Dane, began marrying same-sex couples on their own volition based on Judge Crabb's declaration. By the following business day, June 9, forty-two counties were issuing licenses. Wisconsin Attorney General J. B. Van Hollen filed for an emergency stay from Crabb to stop further marriages and also requested a stay from the Seventh Circuit Court of Appeals in Chicago. Crabb denied the emergency stay because she had not yet issued an injunction that could be stayed. She said that she had yet to decide whether county clerks can issue marriage licenses and that it was for state courts to decide if county clerks were issuing licenses in violation of state law. The Seventh Circuit also denied a stay because Crabb had not yet issued a final ruling. After consultations with the state's department of vital records, Brown and Sheboygan counties began performing same-sex marriages on June 9, though Outagamie and Door counties placed a five-day waiting period on applicants before performing ceremonies. In the case of counties performing ceremonies, the waiting period was waived with a payment of $25 in addition to the license fee to the county clerk. Sixty of Wisconsin's seventy-two counties were issuing licenses during the eight-day window.

On June 12, Attorney General Van Hollen suggested that county clerks issuing same-sex marriage licenses could be prosecuted by their county's individual district attorneys for issuing them against the advice of the attorney general's office.

== Hearing on injunctive relief ==
The ACLU, representing the plaintiffs, submitted proposed language for injunctive relief, as directed by Judge Crabb in her original ruling. The state Office of the Attorney General, while requesting that the court "expedite its ruling and enter final judgment without further hearing or oral argument," has filed an objection to it. On one hand, attorneys for the defendants stated that the proposed injunction "is not sufficiently specific" and "hopelessly vague," and on the other hand, objected to it as "expansive in scope" and described it as "judicial legislation."

On June 13, 2014, Crabb adopted the injunction proposed by the plaintiffs, rewording it to address the concerns of vagueness expressed by the state defendants. She enjoined the defendants from enforcing the ban but stayed "all relief in this case", meaning the injunction and declaration of unconstitutionality (despite her previous finding that defendants could not cite authority to stay a declaration); this effectively ended same-sex marriage even under county clerks' own volition in Wisconsin, pending appeal. The judge expressed the view that she was bound by Supreme Court precedent to enter the stay:

After seeing the expressions of joy on the faces of so many newly wedded couples featured in media reports, I find it difficult to impose a stay on the event that is responsible for eliciting that emotion, even if the stay is only temporary. Same-sex couples have waited many years to receive equal treatment under the law, so it is understandable that they do not want to wait any longer.

== Appeal ==
The state appealed the decision to the Seventh Circuit Court of Appeals on July 10. In response to a request by the original plaintiffs, the Court has combined the case for the purposes of briefing and oral argument with a similar Indiana case, Baskin v. Bogan. Judges Richard Posner, David Hamilton, and Ann Claire Williams heard arguments on August 26 in this case and Baskin v. Bogan.

On September 4, the Seventh Circuit, in a unanimous opinion authored by Judge Richard Posner, upheld the district court decision. He wrote:

The challenged laws discriminate against a minority defined by an immutable characteristic, and the only rationale that the states put forth with any conviction–that same-sex couples and their children don't need marriage because same-sex couples can't produce children, intended or unintended–is so full of holes that it cannot be taken seriously. To the extent that children are better off in families in which the parents are married, they are better off whether they are raised by their biological parents or by adoptive parents.

On September 9, Wisconsin Attorney General Van Hollen asked the U.S. Supreme Court to review the decision. The court stayed its decision before it could take effect. On October 6, 2014, the Supreme Court denied a writ of certiorari to the combined appeal, letting the circuit court decision stand. Attorney General Van Hollen subsequently issued a statement saying that, "the Seventh Circuit affirmed the District Court's decision holding Wisconsin's Marriage Protection Amendment unconstitutional, and the Supreme Court has declined the opportunity to examine that decision. It is now our obligation to comply with those court decisions."

Same-sex marriages resumed after the Seventh Circuit issued its mandate the next day.

== See also ==
- LGBT rights in Wisconsin
- Domestic partnerships in Wisconsin
- Same-sex marriage in Wisconsin
