= Baskin v. Bogan =

Indiana legal case for marriage equality

- No. 14-2386
- Court: United States Court of Appeals for the Seventh Circuit
- Full case name: Marilyn Baskin, et al., Plaintiffs, v. Penny Bogan, et al., Defendants.
- Argued: August 26, 2014
- Decided: September 4, 2014
- Citation: 766 F.3d 648

Case history
- Prior actions: Court of Appeals (7th Cir.): June 30, 2014: Expedited review ordered. June 2, 2014: Emergency stay pending appeal ordered. District Court (S.D. Ind.): June 25, 2014: Judgment for plaintiffs entered, 12 F. Supp. 3d 1144. May 8, 2014: Preliminary injunction granted, 2014 WL 1814064. April 10, 2014: Temporary restraining order granted, 2014 U.S. Dist. LEXIS 54036.
- Subsequent actions: U.S. Supreme Court October 6, 2014: Petition for certiorari denied, 135 S.Ct. 316, 190 L. Ed. 2d 142.

Holding
- The district court's decision is affirmed.

Court membership
- Judges sitting: Richard Posner, David Hamilton, Ann Claire Williams

Keywords
- Same-sex marriage

Baskin v. Bogan, the lead Indiana case challenging that state's denial of marriage rights to same-sex couples, was filed in federal district court on March 12, 2014, naming several government officials as defendants. Chief Judge Richard L. Young found for the plaintiffs on June 25. A three-judge panel of the U.S. Court of Appeals for the Seventh Circuit upheld the district court ruling in a unanimous decision on September 4.

== District court proceedings ==
Lambda Legal filed Baskin v. Bogan in the U.S. District Court for the Southern District of Indiana on March 12, 2014, on behalf of three same-sex couples, all women. Their complaint named as defendants Indiana Attorney General Greg Zoeller and three county clerks, with one of the county clerks, Penny Bogan, in her official capacity, as the first-named defendant.

=== Emergency order ===
Baskin took precedence over the other Indiana marriage cases because one of the plaintiffs, Nikole Quasney, was terminally ill with ovarian cancer. As to her and her partner, U.S. District Judge Richard L. Young granted immediate relief, issuing a 28-day duration emergency order on April 10 and, after oral arguments on May 8 on a motion for summary judgment, a preliminary injunction directing the state parties to recognize the validity of the Quasney's Massachusetts marriage. In doing so, the court temporarily withdrew the motion for as to the rest of the plaintiffs, with Judge Young reasoning it makes a stronger case for the terminally ill couple while also allowing the rest a resolution on the merits without causing undue confusion in case of an appeal.

The state filed an interlocutory appeal of this limited injunction on May 9, 2014, and that portion of the case was briefed in the U.S. Court of Appeals for the Seventh Circuit under the name of Baskin v. Zoeller, where it was docketed as No. 14-2037. Since the plaintiffs have since received a favorable ruling as to the broader issue of same-sex marriage in general, and that issue was appealed as well (see below), this more limited appeal was dismissed by the circuit court on July 14, 2014; with the emergency order remaining in place.

=== District court ruling ===
On June 25, 2014, the U.S. district court ruled as to the case of the remaining plaintiffs in Baskin, as well as the cases of Fujii and Lee. District Judge Richard L. Young found in favor of the plaintiff couples, granting them summary judgment and striking down Indiana's ban on same-sex marriage, while removing Indiana Governor Mike Pence from the lawsuit. Judge Young commented:

In less than a year, every Federal District Court to consider the issue has reached the same conclusion in thoughtful and thorough opinions–laws prohibiting the celebration and recognition of same-sex marriages are unconstitutional ... It is clear that the fundamental right to marry shall not be deprived to some individuals based solely on the person they choose to love. In time, Americans will look at the marriage of couples such as plaintiffs, and refer to it simply as a marriage–not a same-sex marriage. These couples, when gender and sexual orientation are taken away, are in all respects like the family down the street. The Constitution demands that we treat them as such.

The judge found that Indiana's ban violated the Fourteenth Amendment under both due process and equal protection theories and that the state had no rational basis for instituting its ban:

Defendants point to the one extremely limited difference between opposite-sex and same-sex couples, the ability of the couple to naturally and unintentionally procreate, as justification to deny same-sex couples a vast array of rights. The connection between these rights and responsibilities and the ability to conceive unintentionally is too attenuated to support such a broad prohibition.

=== Absence of stay ===
The district court did not issue a stay, and as a result, Indiana clerks began issuing marriage licenses to same-sex couples the day of the ruling. As many as 800 to 1,000 marriage licenses may have been issued in Indiana before the Seventh Circuit brought license issuance to a halt two days later.

== Court of Appeals proceedings ==
Indiana Attorney General Greg Zoeller appealed the District Court's decisions in Baskin v. Bogan, Fujii (appealed sub nom. Fujii v. Commissioner of the Indiana State Dep't of Revenue), and Lee (appealed sub nom. Abbott v. Lee.) On June 27, the Seventh Circuit sua sponte consolidated the cases for briefing and disposition. On the same day, a three-judge panel of the Seventh Circuit, U.S. Circuit Judges Richard Posner, Ann Claire Williams, and David F. Hamilton, granted an emergency stay of the prevailing same-sex marriage cases for the duration of their appeal. On July 2, the same panel granted a motion for one couple's marriage to be recognized immediately because one plaintiff's terminal illness, allowing Amy Sandler and Niki Quasney to become the first same-sex couple legally married in Indiana. The Seventh Circuit set a briefing schedule to be completed on September 19.

=== Dismissal of interlocutory appeal ===
As the Baskin plaintiffs had received a favorable final ruling in U.S. district court that was appealed to the Seventh Circuit (No. 14-2386), the previous interlocutory appeal pending there (No. 14-2037) was in essence duplicate litigation. On a joint motion from the plaintiffs and defendants, on July 14, 2014, the circuit court dismissed this appeal.

=== Consolidation of cases ===
On motion from the plaintiffs, the Seventh Circuit combined Baskin and its companion cases with a similar case on appeal from the Western District of Wisconsin, Wolf v. Walker. The circuit court also expedited proceedings by ordering completion of briefings by August 5. On July 11, the state defendants filed a motion in the circuit court to have the case heard en banc. Without responding to that motion, on July 14, the Seventh Circuit scheduled oral arguments before a three-judge panel. Judges Richard Posner, David Hamilton, and Ann Claire Williams heard arguments on August 26 in this case and Wolf v. Walker.

=== Court of Appeals ruling ===
On September 4, the Seventh Circuit, in a unanimous opinion authored by Judge Richard Posner, upheld the district court decision. He wrote:

The challenged laws discriminate against a minority defined by an immutable characteristic, and the only rationale that the states put forth with any conviction–that same-sex couples and their children don't need marriage because same-sex couples can't produce children, intended or unintended–is so full of holes that it cannot be taken seriously. To the extent that children are better off in families in which the parents are married, they are better off whether they are raised by their biological parents or by adoptive parents.

=== Court of Appeals stay of ruling ===
On September 15, the Seventh Circuit granted a motion for a stay of ruling, to be in effect until this case or one like it is resolved at the Supreme Court.

=== Supreme Court denial of appeal ===
On October 6, 2014, the Supreme Court denied a writ of certiorari to the combined appeal with Wisconsin, letting the circuit court decision stand.
