= Biostatistics Center =

Biostatistics Center may refer to:

- George Washington University Biostatistics Center
- Center for Biostatistics at the Ohio State University
- Biostatistics Center at Massachusetts General Hospital
- Johns Hopkins Biostatistics Center at the Johns Hopkins Bloomberg School of Public Health
