= Tom Novak (professor) =

American academic

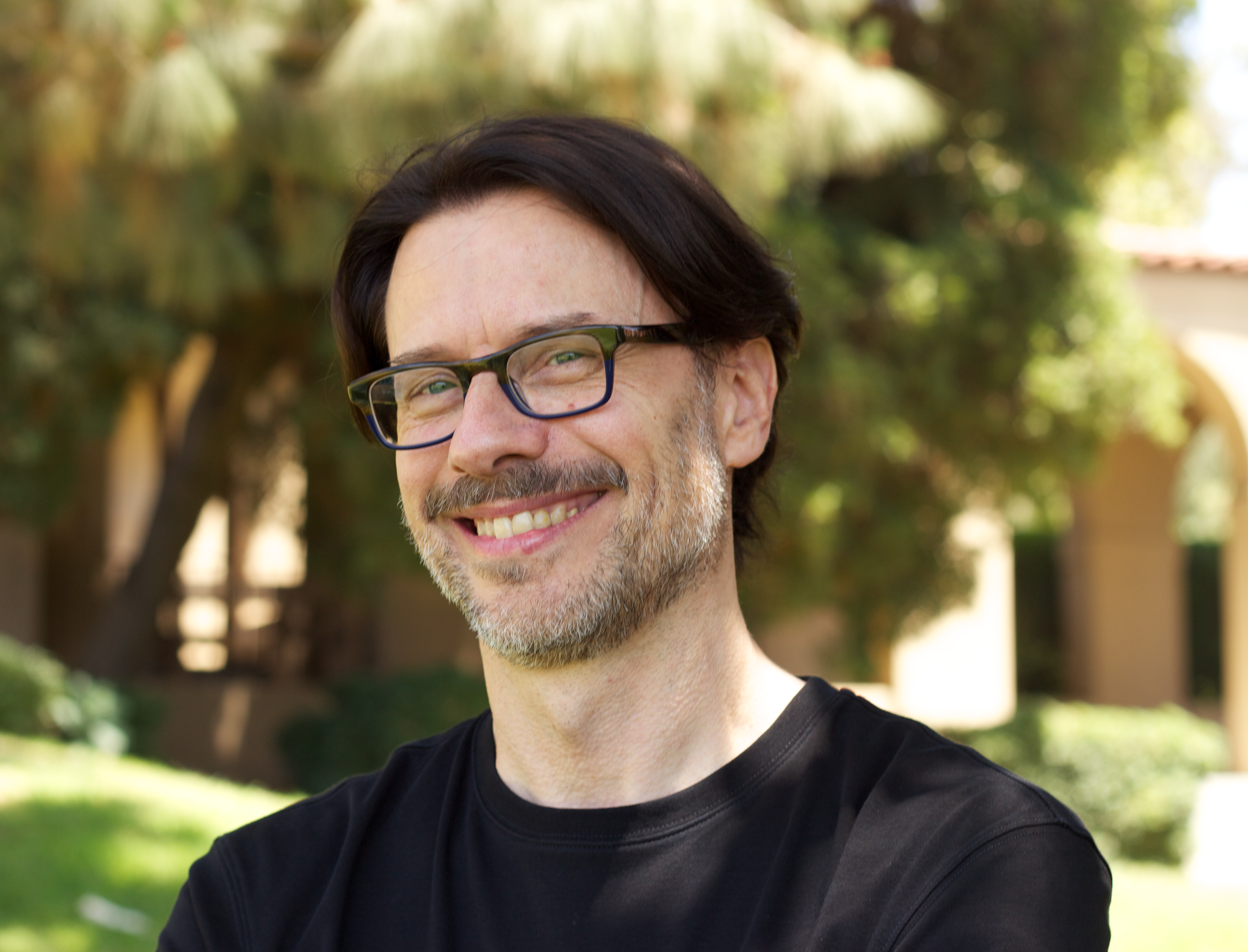

Academic background
- Education: Oberlin College; University of North Carolina

Academic work
- Discipline: Center for the Connected Consumer
- Institutions: The George Washington University

Thomas P. Novak is the Denit Trust Distinguished Scholar and Professor of Marketing at The George Washington University School of Business, where he co-directs the Center for the Connected Consumer and the Connected Consumer Panel. Professor Novak’s research since 1993 has focused exclusively on consumer behavior in online environments and digital marketing. His current research interests deal with consumer motivations for using social media, the impact of the social web on consumer well-being, and post-social media marketing including the gamification of marketing, the Internet of Things, and the connected consumer.

Over the past two decades, Novak and his wife, Donna Hoffman co-founded and co-directed a series of research centers (Project 2000, eLab, the Sloan Center for Internet Retailing, and the Center for the Connected Consumer) with support from the Alfred P. Sloan Foundation, the National Science Foundation, Paul Allen’s Interval Research Corporation and 40 other corporate sponsors including Walmart.com, Netscape, Procter & Gamble, and Hershey’s.

== Research ==
An internationally recognized academic researcher in Web-based commerce, Novak has published extensively on the subject in top academic journals in a range of scholarly disciplines. His work has had global impact with over 14,000 citations in Google Scholar. He has been awarded numerous prestigious research awards, including the Sheth Foundation/Journal of Marketing Award for long-term contributions to the discipline of marketing, the Stellner Distinguished Scholar Award from the University of Illinois, the Robert D. Buzzell Marketing Science Institute Best Paper Award Honorable Mention. He has won research proposal competitions from the Marketing Science Institute, Google, and the University of Pennsylvania, and was named a finalist for the Paul D. Converse Award, for his lasting contributions to the marketing field.

== Academic career ==
Prior to joining the faculty at "the George Washington University" in 2013, Novak served on the faculties of the "University of California", "Vanderbilt University", and Southern Methodist University. From 1995 through 1999, he spent summers as a visiting scholar at Paul Allen’s Interval Research Corporation, Palo Alto California, was a visiting scholar at Stanford University in the summers of 1997 and 2000, was a visiting scholar at the USC Annenberg School for Communication and Journalism in Fall 2010, and visited at New York University and Columbia University in the late 1980s. Prior to joining academia he spent five years at Young & Rubicam, New York.

Novak received his A.B. in Psychology from Oberlin College in 1977 and his M.A. (1980) and Ph.D. (1984, in quantitative psychology with a formal minor in Biostatistics) from the L. L. Thurstone Psychometric Laboratory at the University of North Carolina, Chapel Hill. He was recognized as a University of North Carolina Distinguished Graduate Alumni in 2002.
