= Wisconsin Assembly Bill 377 =

Failed 2023–24 law in U.S. state

Assembly Bill 377

Wisconsin Legislature
- Long title: An Act to amend 118.13 (1); and to create 118.132 of the statutes; Relating to: designating athletic sports and teams operated or sponsored by public schools or private schools participating in a parental choice program based on the sex of the participants.
- Territorial extent: Wisconsin
- Considered by: Wisconsin State Assembly
- Considered by: Wisconsin Senate
- Vetoed by: Tony Evers
- Vetoed: April 2, 2024

Legislative history

Initiating chamber: Wisconsin State Assembly
- Introduced: August 11, 2023
- First reading: August 11, 2023
- Second reading: October 12, 2023
- Third reading: October 12, 2023
- Voting summary: 63 voted for; 35 voted against; 1 absent

Revising chamber: Wisconsin Senate
- Received from the Wisconsin State Assembly: October 12, 2023
- First reading: October 13, 2023
- Second reading: March 12, 2024
- Third reading: March 12, 2024
- Voting summary: 21 voted for; 11 voted against

Summary
- Prohibits anybody in Wisconsin from competing in K-12 sports that do not align with their biological sex.
- Status: Veto override failed

Wisconsin Assembly Bill 377 (AB 377), also known as the Save Women's Sports Act, was a proposed law in the state of Wisconsin that would have restricted interscholastic sport competitions and leagues in K-12 schools to biological sex and not gender identity. It was vetoed by Governor Tony Evers on April 2, 2024, and never became law due to Republicans not having enough votes to override his veto.

The bill was generally targeted towards transgender women and sought to prohibit them from competing in women's sports, though it applied to all genders and sexes. The Wisconsin Interscholastic Athletic Association already had regulations dating back to 2015 regarding transgender people competing in school sports, mandating at least one year of hormone replacement therapy (HRT) before being allowed to compete.

== Provisions ==
Assembly Bill 377 bars transgender Wisconsinites from playing in school sports that align with their gender identity and instead restricts it to biological sex. It would have been based on the sex listed on someone's birth certificate. Assembly Bill 377 differs from Assembly Bill 378, a very similar bill, in that it targets K-12 public and private schools instead of colleges.

== Reactions ==
=== Support ===
Riley Gaines, a conservative activist prominent for opposing transgender women competing in women's sports, criticized Governor Evers for vetoing the law.

=== Opposition ===
Governor Evers, who vetoed the law, stated that he would never abandon LGBTQ+ people in Wisconsin nor their rights. Fair Wisconsin, the state's only LGBTQ+ advocacy group, also opposed AB 377.

== See also ==
- LGBTQ rights in Wisconsin
