= Appling v. Walker =

- Court: Wisconsin Supreme Court
- Full case name: Julaine K. Appling, Jo Egelhoff, Jaren E. Hiller, Richard Kessenich and Edmund L. Webster, Plaintiffs-Appellants-Petitioners v. Scott Walker, Kitty Rhoades and Oskar Anderson, Defendants-Respondents, Fair Wisconsin, Inc., Glenn Carlson, Michael Childers, Crystal Hyslop, Janice Czyscon, Kathy Flores, Ann Kendzierski, David Kopitzke, Paul Klawiter, Chad Wege and Andrew Topcik (Wege), Intervening Defendants-Respondents
- Decided: July 31, 2014
- Citation: 2014 WI 96; 358 Wis. 2d 132; 853 N.W.2d 888

Case history
- Appealed from: Appling v. Doyle, 2013 WI App 3, 345 Wis. 2d 762, 826 N.W.2d 666

Court membership
- Judges sitting: N. Patrick Crooks, Shirley S. Abrahamson, Patience D. Roggensack

Case opinions
- Decision by: Crooks
- Concurrence: Abrahamson, Roggensack

Appling v. Walker was a state court lawsuit that challenged the constitutionality of Wisconsin's domestic partnership registry. The action began as a petition for original action before the Wisconsin Supreme Court asking the Court for a declaration that the registry is unconstitutional and for a permanent injunction against the registry, which began registering couples on August 3, 2009. On November 4, 2009, the Court declined to take the case. Petitioners then refiled in state circuit court and the court ruled in June 2011 that the registry is constitutional. That decision was affirmed by a state appeals court in December 2012, and by the Wisconsin Supreme Court in July 2014.

== History ==
On June 29, 2009, Wisconsin Governor Jim Doyle signed the same-sex domestic partnership registry into law as a provision of the 2010-11 state budget. The registry created a legal recognition of same-sex unions in Wisconsin, enumerating 43 rights and benefits for registered couples.

On July 23, 2009, Julaine Appling, President of Wisconsin Family Action, through attorneys at the Alliance Defense Fund (ADF) and ADF-allied attorneys in Wisconsin, filed an original action with the Wisconsin Supreme Court asking it to declare the same-sex domestic partnership registry unconstitutional and permanently enjoin the defendants from the enactment of the registry. Wisconsin Attorney General J. B. Van Hollen refused to defend the suit, then titled Appling v. Doyle, agreeing that the registry violated the state constitution. Doyle hired outside counsel to defend it.

The petition asserted that the registry violates Wisconsin's Marriage Protection Amendment, ratified by Wisconsin voters on November 7, 2006. The amendment states:

Only a marriage between one man and one woman shall be valid or recognized as a marriage in this state. A legal status identical or substantially similar to that of marriage for unmarried individuals shall not be valid or recognized in this state. Wisconsin Constitution; Article XIII, Section 13.

On September 22, 2009, Fair Wisconsin and its members, represented by Lambda Legal, filed a motion to intervene in the case. Five same-sex Wisconsin couples, who have registered as domestic partners and are being represented by the American Civil Liberties Union, also filed a motion to intervene. In a motion filed the same day, the ACLU asked the Wisconsin Supreme Court to deny the petitioners' request for the court to hear the case directly and to send the case to a trial court to develop a factual record. On November 4, the Supreme Court denied the petition. Petitioners refiled the lawsuit in Dane County District Court in 2010.

In 2011, Scott Walker became the Governor of Wisconsin, and in March, he fired the lawyer representing the state. On May 13, Walker petitioned the trial court to allow the state to withdraw from the case, citing his belief that the registry is unconstitutional.

== Argument ==
The petitioners claimed:

The form of domestic partnership created by the domestic partnership registry is prohibited by Art. XIII, sec. 13 of the Wisconsin Constitution by creating and requiring recognition of a legal status substantially similar to that of marriage...Such domestic partnerships are entered into by same-sex partners and are officially created and acknowledged in essentially the identical way that marriages are entered into by a man and woman and are officially created and acknowledged.

The petitioners believed the registry violated the Wisconsin Marriage Protection Amendment because it creates a new legal status for domestic partners. The requirements for obtaining a domestic partnership certificate are the same as those required for obtaining a marriage license. The price for a certificate is the same as for a marriage license.

The petitioners asked the Court to accept the case as an original action before the Court (instead of working the case up from the trial court level), to declare the same-sex domestic partnership registry unconstitutional, and to stop the enactment of the same-sex domestic partnership registry.

== Parties ==
=== Petitioners ===
The petitioners in the case are Wisconsin residents and taxpayers and members of the board of directors of Wisconsin Family Action.

- Julaine Appling, Wisconsin Family Action President
- Jaren E. Hiller, Wisconsin Family Action board member
- Edmund L. Webster, Wisconsin Family Action board member

=== Respondents ===
- Scott Walker, in his official capacity as Governor of the State of Wisconsin
- Karen Timberlake, in her official capacity as Secretary of the Wisconsin Department of Health Services
- John Kiesow, in his official capacity as State Registrar of Vital Statistics

=== Intervening defendants ===
- Fair Wisconsin and its members
- Five same-sex Wisconsin couples who have registered as domestic partners since the law came into effect

=== Legal representation ===
Attorney Richard M. Esenberg, Michael D. Dean for the First Freedoms Foundation and attorneys Austin Nimocks and Brian Raum from the Alliance Defense Fund represented the Wisconsin Family Action board members. Madison attorney Lester Pine defended the state until being dismissed by Walker in March 2011. Brian Hagedorn filed the petition on behalf of Walker to withdraw from the case. Christopher Clark represented Fair Wisconsin.

== Decisions ==
June 20, 2011: Circuit court Judge Dan Moeser ruled that the domestic partnership registry did not violate the state constitution, finding that the state "does not recognize domestic partnership in a way that even remotely resembles how the state recognizes marriage".

December 21, 2012: The District 4 Court of Appeals affirmed Judge Moeser's decision in a unanimous ruling.

July 31, 2014: The Wisconsin Supreme Court ruled unanimously that the registry is constitutional, citing statements made by proponents of the constitutional amendment at issue "that the Amendment simply would not preclude a mechanism for legislative grants of certain rights to same-sex couples".

== See also ==
- LGBT rights in Wisconsin
- Domestic partnerships in Wisconsin
