= LGBTQ rights in Wisconsin =

- Wisconsin (US)
- Legal status: Legal since 1983
- Gender identity: Sex change legal, but requires sex reassignment surgery
- Discrimination protections: Sexual orientation in all areas (but gender identity only within government employment)

Family rights
- Recognition of relationships: Same-sex marriage since 2014; Domestic partnerships legal from 2009 to 2018
- Adoption: Same-sex couples allowed to adopt

Lesbian, gay, bisexual, transgender, and queer (LGBTQ) people in the U.S. state of Wisconsin enjoy most of the same rights as non-LGBTQ people. However, the transgender community may face some legal issues not experienced by cisgender residents, due in part to discrimination based on gender identity not being included in Wisconsin's anti-discrimination laws, nor is it covered in the state's hate crime law. Same-sex marriage has been legal in Wisconsin since October 6, 2014, when the U.S. Supreme Court refused to consider an appeal in the case of Wolf v. Walker. Discrimination based on sexual orientation is banned statewide in Wisconsin, and sexual orientation is a protected class in the state's hate crime laws. It approved such protections in 1982, making it the first state in the United States to do so.

Wisconsin is also the first state to have elected an LGBT U.S. senator, Democrat Tammy Baldwin. As of 2021, polls have found that about two-thirds of Wisconsinites support same-sex marriage.

== Legality of same-sex sexual activity ==
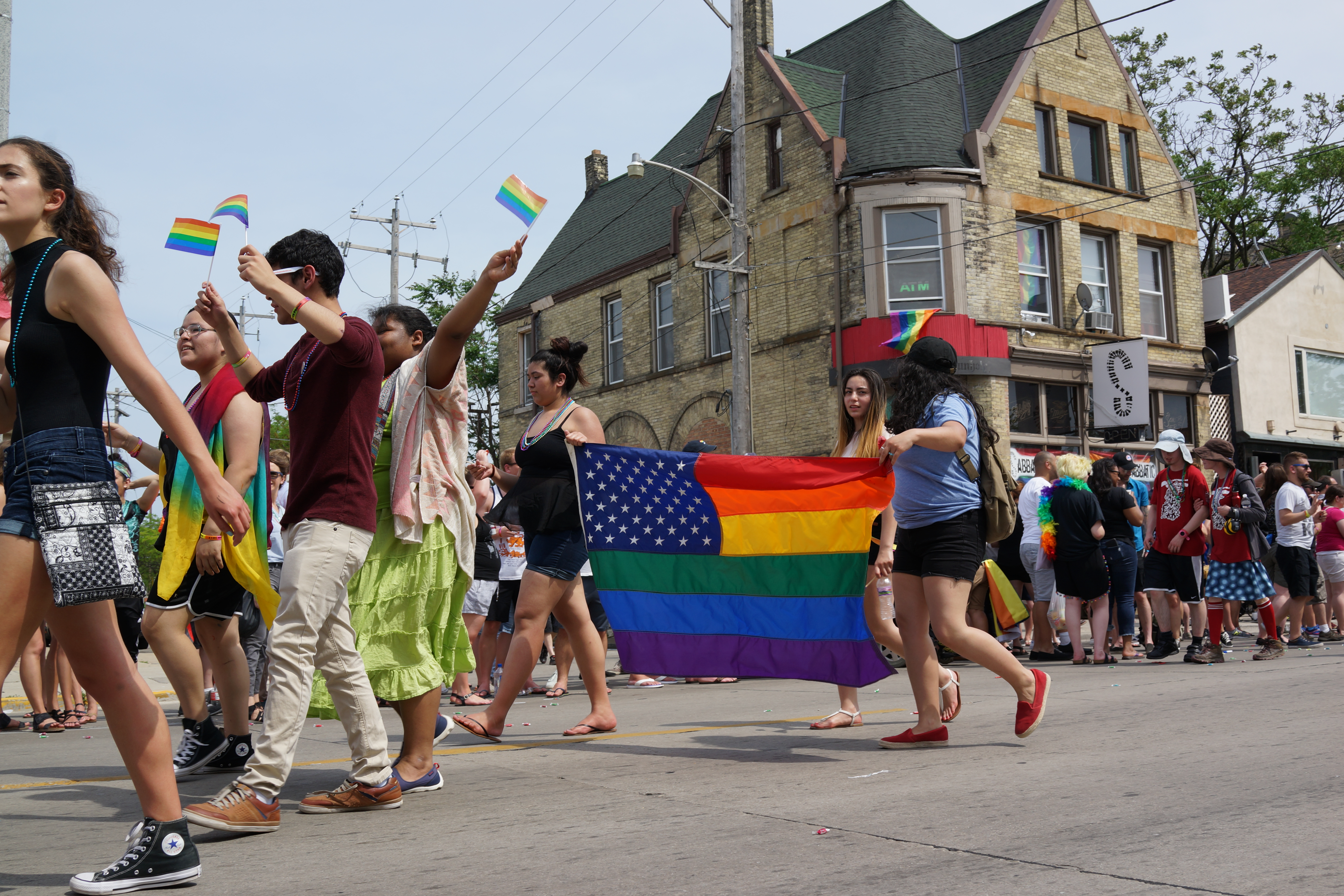
Milwaukee Pride parade in 2017

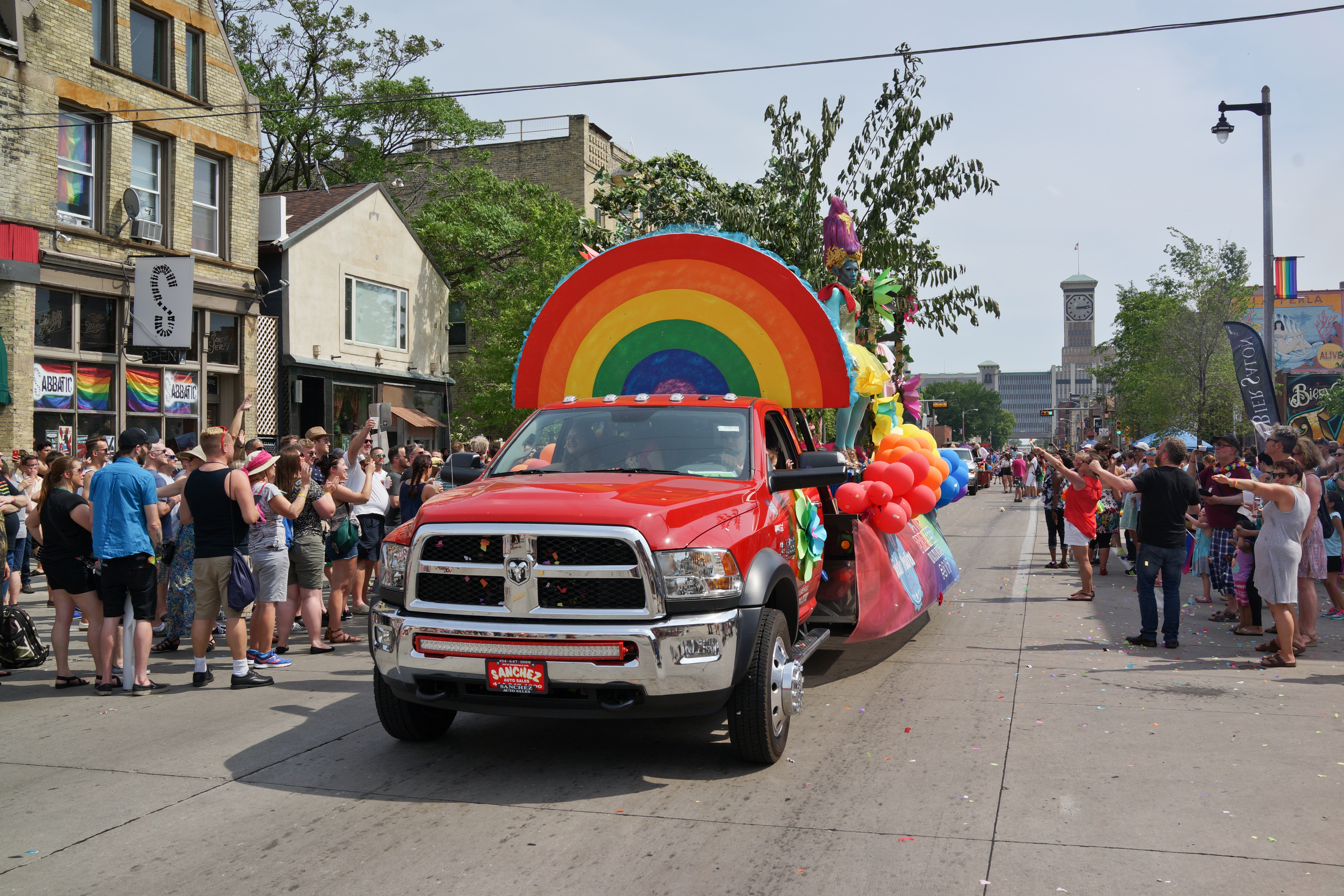
Milwaukee Pride parade in 2017. The Allen-Bradley Clock Tower can be seen in the background.

Before the arrival of the Europeans, there were no known legal or social punishments for engaging in homosexual activity. Several Native American tribes recognized individuals who would act, behave and live as the opposite biological sex, nowadays also called "two-spirit". The Potawatomi refer to male-bodied individuals who act as female as m'netokwe. They are ikwekaazo (literally "men who chose to function as women") among the Ojibwe. Likewise, female-bodied individuals who act and live as male are ininiikaazo (literally "women who choose to function as men").

Wisconsin was part of the Michigan Territory in 1836, when it adopted a prohibition on sodomy that applied to both heterosexual and homosexual sexual activities, excluding cunnilingus. The criminal prohibition was retained when Wisconsin became a state in 1848. The law applied to private consensual activity as well. The definition was expanded to include fellatio in 1897 as well as the new crime of "taking improper liberties" with a minor. In the 1950s, following a series of high-profile sex crimes, Wisconsin criminalized cunnilingus and increased the penalties for "sexual perversion" to five years' imprisonment. In 1959, the state barred persons convicted of "sexual perversion" from using an automobile or any vehicle requiring a license.

In 1913, the Wisconsin Legislature passed a law providing for the possible sterilization of criminals in state institutions, including those convicted under the sodomy statute. Through the end of 1934, 645 Wisconsinites had been sterilized under the law, all of them "insane or mentally retarded". The extent of the law's application on gay men and lesbians is unknown. The statute was repealed in 1978.

In 1966, the Wisconsin Young Democrats approved a resolution urging "the abolition of all legal restriction on sexual relations between consenting adults which do not violate the rights of others", one of the first major political organizations in the United States to do so. Republican Governor Warren P. Knowles referred to supporters of the resolution as "homocrats" and some Democrats of various ages distanced themselves from the language.

Lloyd Barbee, Milwaukee legislature and civil rights activist, introduced a bill to the State Assembly in 1967 that would "decriminalize homosexuality and all consenting sexual practices." He followed it up with introducing an anti-discrimination bill in 1971. Neither one passed while Barbee was in office, but both were taken up by freshman lawmaker David Clarenbach in 1976.

In the 1970s, court challenges to the sodomy law on privacy grounds failed, but the Wisconsin Supreme Court ruled that the law should not apply to private and consensual acts between a husband and wife. In 1976, the state repealed its ban on newspapers' covering sodomy trials. In 1977, the state reclassified consensual sodomy as a misdemeanor, punishable with nine months in jail and/or a fine of 10,000 U.S. dollars. Also in 1977, Milwaukee college student Leon Rouse started campaigning for gay rights in response to Anita Bryant allying herself with Christian fundamentalists. Rouse was able to organize Christian and Jewish clergy to join the board of Committee for Fundamental Judeo-Christian Human Rights, which in turn lobbied and testified for the gay rights bill.

In 1983, Wisconsin legalized private, non-commercial acts of sodomy between consenting adults. In order to obtain sufficient votes among legislators, the bill stated that Wisconsin did not approve of "any sexual conduct outside of the institution of marriage."

== Recognition of same-sex relationships ==
=== Marriage ===
In 2006, Fair Wisconsin organized a statewide campaign to oppose Wisconsin's constitutional amendment banning marriage equality and civil unions. Fair Wisconsin spent $4,285,746 fighting this campaign. Ultimately the constitutional amendment passed and became law.

On June 6, 2014, Judge Barbara Brandriff Crabb of the United States District Court for the Western District of Wisconsin, ruling in Wolf v. Walker, struck down the state's constitutional and legislative ban on same-sex marriage as a violation of the Fourteenth Amendment of the U.S. Constitution. Crabb halted her own ruling until October 6, 2014, saying "A federal district court is required to follow the guidance provided by the Supreme Court. Because I see no way to distinguish this case from Herbert, I conclude that I must stay any injunctive relief pending appeal". In October, the U.S. Supreme Court declined to hear an appeal in the case, allowing her ruling to take effect and ending Wisconsin's denial of marriage rights to same-sex couples.

=== Domestic partnerships ===
Wisconsin also had a registry of domestic partnerships that provided same-sex couples with limited rights, specifically 43 of the more than 200 spousal rights afforded to different-sex couples. The registry, Chapter 770, was established in 2009 by a provision included in the state's biennial budget bill and signed into law by Democratic Governor Jim Doyle. Wisconsin's domestic partnership registry for same-sex couples did not grant stepchild adoptions. Wisconsin was the first state in the Midwest to enact a form of recognition for same-sex unions. Out of the several states that had bans on same-sex marriage and/or civil unions, Wisconsin was the first and only one to enact limited domestic partnerships.

In 2010 Wisconsin Family Action and the Alliance Defense Fund asserted that the registry violated Wisconsin's state’s constitutional ban on marriage equality and civil unions. Fair Wisconsin was the sole intervening party in the lawsuit. The registry survived the court challenge, originally Appling v. Doyle On July 31, 2014, the Wisconsin Supreme Court ruled unanimously in the case, now known as Appling v. Walker, that the registry was constitutional, citing statements made by proponents of the constitutional amendment at issue "that the Amendment simply would not preclude a mechanism for legislative grants of certain rights to same-sex couples".

Wisconsin has provided benefits to same-sex partners of state employees since 2009. In some jurisdictions, domestic partnership benefits for state employees had been expanded beyond those rights provided to other employees under the state's domestic partnership registry. Domestic partner benefits for state employees ensures that the dependents of one partner are covered by the other partner's health insurance.

Wisconsin ended the domestic partnership registry on April 1, 2018.

== Adoption and parenting ==
Wisconsin's domestic partner registry did not grant parental rights, but same-sex couples could obtain limited rights through a co-parenting agreement, which may not have always been enforced, or another legal arrangement granted by state courts.

Residents in Wisconsin may adopt as individuals without respect to sexual orientation. Married same-sex couples are permitted to adopt. Adoption agencies in Wisconsin will ensure that once a spouse in a same-sex relationship attains parental rights the other spouse receives comparable parental rights or full guardianship.

Additionally, lesbian couples can access in vitro fertilization (IVF) and artificial insemination treatment. State law recognizes the non-genetic, non-gestational mother as a legal parent to a child born via donor inseminmnation, but only if the parents are married.

In September 2016, a federal judge ruled that the state must record the names of both same-sex parents on the birth certificates of their children. The ruling came as a result of a lesbian couple who sued the Wisconsin Department of Health Services in 2015 after it refused to register both their names on the birth certificate of their son.

=== Gender-neutral birth certificate options ===
From July 1, 2021 birth certificates of children from same-sex couples within Wisconsin will have gender-neutral options of "spouse and spouse" or "parent 1 and parent 2".

== Discrimination protections ==
Map of Wisconsin counties and cities that have sexual orientation and/or gender identity anti–employment discrimination ordinances Sexual orientation and gender identity with anti–employment discrimination ordinance Sexual orientation with anti–employment discrimination ordinance and gender identity solely in state employment

In 1982, Wisconsin was the first state to ban discrimination based on sexual orientation in employment, housing, education, credit and all public accommodations. When Republican Governor Lee S. Dreyfus signed the law, he said that "It is a fundamental tenet of the Republican Party that government ought not intrude in the private lives of individuals where no state purpose is served, and there is nothing more private or intimate than who you live with and who you love."

There are no state-level laws against discrimination based on gender identity. However, in January 2019, Governor Tony Evers in coordination with Fair Wisconsin issued Executive Order #1 which prohibiting discrimination on the basis of gender identity in government employment.

In addition, the counties of Dane, and Milwaukee, along with the cities of Appleton, Cudahy, De Pere, Janesville, Madison, Milwaukee, and Racine ban discrimination based on gender identity. The cities of Oshkosh and Stevens Point have policies banning discrimination against transgender city employees only.

=== Hate crime law ===
Wisconsin law punishes hate crimes based on sexual orientation, but not gender identity.

Although gender identity is not explicitly included in Wisconsin's hate crime legislation, perceived sexual orientation is often used as a medium to prosecute individuals who commit a crime based on the victim's gender identity.

=== Anti-bullying laws and policies ===
In 2001, Wisconsin legislators passed a law that prohibits discrimination based on sexual orientation in any school setting.

Any school in the state of Wisconsin that receives federal funding (regardless of being public or private) "are required by federal law to address discrimination on a number of different personal characteristics."

== Gender identity and expression ==
Wisconsin allows a person born in the state who has completed sex reassignment surgery to amend their birth certificate once documentation of the surgery and of a change of name is provided.

Since January 2019, sex reassignment surgery has to be explicitly included within Wisconsin Medicaid programs for government employees. In May 2019, a federal judge ordered the program to be immediately extended to non-government employees as well, under the Equal Protection Clause of the 14th Amendment of the United States Constitution. In June 2023, an "extensive and comprehensive budget" bill passed both houses of the Wisconsin Legislature that bans Medicaid (state based health insurance) coverage of sexual reassignment surgery and other gender-affirming healthcare to all individuals, regardless of age. The Governor of Wisconsin vetoed the bill formally "as under a line item veto power provision". In October 2023, Governor Evers said he would "veto any bill that makes Wisconsin a less welcoming, less inclusive, and less safe place for you to be who you are”, speaking to "LGBTQ folks — especially our trans kids". In December 2023, the Governor vetoed a bill passed by the legislature that would explicitly ban gender-affirming healthcare to individuals under 18.

=== People involved in the justice system ===
People in prison are entitled to hormone therapy. A 2005 Wisconsin statute denying hormone therapy to prisoners undergoing sex reassignment surgery, the Inmate Sex Change Prevention Act, was ruled unconstitutional in a unanimous opinion in the case of Fields v. Smith by a three-judge panel of United States Court of Appeals for the Seventh Circuit on August 5, 2011. The U.S. Supreme Court declined to hear the state's appeal of that decision on March 26, 2012.

People on Wisconsin's sex offender registry are not allowed to change their names. There is no exception if the person is transgender.

=== Milwaukee police department ===
Since September 2023, the Milwaukee Police Department no longer lists gender (as well as race) of victims to avoid misgendering transgender individuals in the future.

== Anti-LGBTQ+ & Anti-Trans Legislation 2021-Present ==
=== Sports ===
In 2021, Republicans in the Wisconsin state legislature introduced the first transgender athlete ban in Wisconsin. This bill would have banned transgender women from playing on sports teams that aligned with their gender. The state assembly passed this bill on party lines, however the state senate never voted on it and it failed to reach Governor Tony Evers's desk. The transgender athlete bans were re-introduced in 2023.

Both of the introductions of these bill sparked significant backlash from organizational and community advocates, including Fair Wisconsin, GSAFE, and the ACLU of Wisconsin.

In 2024, the Wisconsin Legislature passed a bill banning transgender individuals from female sports and athletics teams. The Governor of Wisconsin vetoed the bill.

=== Transgender Medical Care Ban ===
In 2021, Republicans introduced a bill which would have prohibited insurance companies from covering procedures related to gender affirming care for minors. This bill ultimately failed to pass out of committee and never reached the Governor's desk. In 2023, Republicans re-introduced this bill again, sparking significant community backlash. This bill was passed by the state assembly on October 12th, 2023, and then by the state senate on October 17th, 2023. This bill was vetoed by Governor Tony Evers on December 6th 2023.

== Conversion therapy ==
In March 2018, Milwaukee became the first city in Wisconsin to approve a conversion therapy ban on minors. The ordinance was signed into law by Mayor Tom Barrett on April 4, and it went into effect 10 days later. In July 2018, Madison, the state capital, similarly approved a conversion therapy ban. The city of Eau Claire followed suit in October 2018.

In September 2018, the Eau Claire School Board became the first school district in Wisconsin, and in the United States, to ban school-based health center agreements with health clinics and/or providers that "endorse or engage in the practice of conversion therapy."

In January 2019, Cudahy became the fourth city in Wisconsin to legally ban conversion therapy on LGBT minors. Shorewood and Racine followed suit in June and July 2019, and Glendale, Sheboygan and Superior passed similar ordinances in August 2019.

In June 2020, the Wisconsin GOP party blocked a regulation to ban conversion therapy on minors state-wide.

In September 2020, West Allis by a vote of 6-3 passed an ordinance banning conversion therapy on minors.

In October 2020, by a vote of 14-1 Kenosha passed an ordinance that banned conversion therapy on minors. Violators can be fined a maximum of $1,000, plus the cost of courts, prosecution, assessments, among other fees and 90 days maximum in the Kenosha County Jail. The court may also suspend driving privileges for up to five years until costs are paid, a legal first for the United States.

In May 2021, Sun Prairie unanimously approved a ban on conversion therapy on minors, with mayor Paul Esser expressing support for the ban, citing that his eldest son is gay.

Currently 14 communities in Wisconsin ban conversion therapy: Appleton, Cudahy, Eau Claire, Glendale, Kenosha, La Crosse, Madison, Milwaukee, Racine, Sheboygan, Shorewood, Sun Prairie, Superior and West Allis.

In July 2025, the Supreme Court of Wisconsin ruled 4-3 that conversion therapy bans can be enacted by regulation and executive order, bypassing the state legislature in the absence of legislation.

=== Wisconsin executive order ===
In June 2021 during pride month, an executive order was written and signed by the Governor of Wisconsin to legally ban "any state taxpayers dollars within Wisconsin funding conversion therapy on LGBT minors". Various counties and cities within Wisconsin already legally ban conversion therapy by local ordinances.

=== GOP blocks regulations ===
In January 2023, the GOP blocked regulations within the Wisconsin Legislature to make conversion therapy a code of conduct violation for marriage and family therapists, professional counselors and social workers.

== Public opinion ==
A 2017 Public Religion Research Institute (PRRI) opinion poll found that 66% of Wisconsin residents supported same-sex marriage, while 26% opposed it and 8% were unsure. Additionally, 73% supported an anti-discrimination law covering sexual orientation and gender identity. 20% were opposed.

Public opinion for LGBTQ anti-discrimination laws in Wisconsin
Poll source	Date(s) administered	Sample size	Margin of error	% support	% opposition	% no opinion
Public Religion Research Institute	January 3-December 30, 2018	1,079	?	67%	26%	7%
Public Religion Research Institute	April 5-December 23, 2017	1,522	?	73%	20%	1%
Public Religion Research Institute	April 29, 2015-January 7, 2016	1,900	?	73%	23%	4%

== Summary table ==
Same-sex sexual activity legal	Yes (Since 1983)
Equal age of consent	Yes
Anti-discrimination laws for sexual orientation	Yes (Since 1982)
Anti-discrimination laws for gender identity and expression	No / Yes (Varies by county and city; discrimination against government employees outlawed since 2019)
Hate crime laws include sexual orientation	Yes (Since 1988)
Hate crime laws include gender identity	No
Bullying in schools prohibited	Yes / No (Only on the basis of sexual orientation)
Same-sex marriage	Yes (Since 2014)
Stepchild adoption by same-sex couples	Yes (Since 2014)
Joint adoption by same-sex couples	Yes (Since 2014)
Gays, lesbians and bisexuals allowed to serve openly in the military	Yes (Since 2011)
Transgender people allowed to serve openly in the military	No (Since 2025)
Cross-dressers allowed to serve openly in the military	No
Intersex people allowed to serve openly in the military	/ Yes (Current DoD policy bans "Hermaphrodites" from serving or enlisting in the military)
Right to change legal gender	Yes (Requires sex reassignment surgery)
Conversion therapy practices banned on minors enacted	Yes (Since 2025)
MSMs allowed to donate blood	Yes (Since 2023)

== See also ==
- Equality Wisconsin
