= School-Based Health Alliance =

- Formation: 1995
- Type: nonprofit organization
- Purpose: school-based health centers
- Key people: Robert Boyd, CEO

The School-Based Health Alliance is a nonprofit organization that promotes and supports school-based health centers in the United States.

== About ==
The School-Based Health Alliance was founded in 1995. The School-Based Health Alliance advocates for national policies, programs, and funding to expand and strengthen centers, while also supporting the movement with training and technical assistance. They establish and advocate for national policy priorities, promote high-quality clinical practices and standards, support data collection and reporting, evaluation, and research, and provide training, technical assistance, and consultation. We believe that all children and adolescents deserve to thrive. But too many struggle because they lack equitable access to health care services. School-based health care is the solution, bringing health care to where students already spend the majority of their time: in school. When schools, families, students, and the community work together, students win!

School-based health centers (SBHCs) located in or near schools, provide the nation's vulnerable children and youth with access to primary care, behavioral health, oral health, and vision care where they spend the majority of their time – at school. Working at the intersection of health and education, SBHCs collaborate with school districts, school principals, teachers, school staff, families, and students. This collaboration, care coordination, and youth engagement results in not only improved student, school staff, and community health literacy and outcomes, but also contributes to positive educational outcomes including reduced absenteeism, decreased disciplinary actions and suspensions, and improved graduation rates. SBHCs advocate for the needs of low-income children, youth, and families, provide them with a safe haven, and serve as a protective factor that reduces poor health and education outcomes.
