= 2006 Wisconsin Referendum 1 =

Referendum to ban same-sex marriage

Referendum 1
- Only a marriage between one man and one woman shall be valid or recognized as a marriage in this state. A legal status identical or substantially similar to that of marriage for unmarried individuals shall not be valid or recognized in this state.

Results
Choice	Votes	%
Yes	1,264,310	59.43%
No	862,924	40.57%
Valid votes	2,127,234	97.44%
Invalid or blank votes	55,921	2.56%
Total votes	2,183,155	100.00%
Registered voters/turnout	4,256,721	49.97%

Yes
90–100%
80–90%
70–80%
60–70%
50–60%
No
90–100%
80–90%
70–80%
60–70%
50–60%
Other
Tie
No data

Wisconsin Referendum 1 of 2006 was a referendum on an amendment to the Wisconsin Constitution that would invalidate same-sex marriages or any substantially similar legal status. The referendum was approved by 59% of voters during the general elections in November 2006. All counties in the state voted for the amendment except Dane County (home of the state capital, Madison, and the University of Wisconsin), which opposed it. The constitutional amendment created by Referendum 1 was invalidated by the United States Court of Appeals for the Seventh Circuit in Wolf v. Walker in 2014, and has been effectively nullified since June 26, 2015, when the United States Supreme Court ruled in Obergefell v. Hodges that state-level bans on same-sex marriage are unconstitutional.

== Amendment ==
The text of the adopted amendment, which became Article XIII, Section 13 of the state constitution, reads:

Only a marriage between one man and one woman shall be valid or recognized as a marriage in this state. A legal status identical or substantially similar to that of marriage for unmarried individuals shall not be valid or recognized in this state.

As required by the constitution, the amendment was approved by both houses of the legislature, in two consecutive sessions. The legislative history of the amendment is as follows:

- March 5, 2004: Approved by Wisconsin State Assembly by a vote of 68–27.
- March 12, 2004: Approved by Wisconsin State Senate by a vote of 20–13.
- December 6, 2005: Approved by the State Senate a second time, by a vote of 19–14.
- February 28, 2006: Approved by the State Assembly a second time.
- November 7, 2006: Approved by referendum, by a margin of 59.4%–40.6%.

County	Yes		No		Total votes
County	#	%	#	%	#
Adams	5,142	65.2%	2,741	34.8%	7,883
Ashland	3,566	59.9%	2,392	40.1%	5,958
Barron	10,958	68.8%	4,962	31.2%	15,920
Bayfield	4,132	57.9%	3,010	42.1%	7,142
Brown	55,780	60.6%	36,305	39.4%	92,085
Buffalo	3,428	64.1%	1,921	35.9%	5,349
Burnett	4,418	72.4%	1,686	27.6%	6,104
Calumet	13,338	69.0%	5,986	31.0%	19,324
Chippewa	13,993	65.4%	7,408	34.6%	21,401
Clark	7,737	69.2%	3,436	30.8%	11,173
Columbia	13,023	59.5%	8,866	40.5%	21,889
Crawford	3,980	62.1%	2,427	37.9%	6,407
Dane	70,377	33.1%	142,491	66.9%	212,868
Dodge	22,552	73.4%	8,154	26.6%	30,706
Door	8,412	59.2%	5,790	40.8%	14,202
Douglas	9,316	59.9%	6,241	40.1%	15,557
Dunn	8,520	58.9%	5,939	41.1%	14,459
Eau Claire	19,595	51.7%	18,297	48.3%	37,892
Florence	1,515	75.9%	481	24.1%	1,996
Fond du Lac	25,745	68.7%	11,731	31.3%	37,476
Forest	2,407	67.1%	1,180	32.9%	3,587
Grant	10,546	62.5%	6,321	37.5%	16,867
Green	7,074	54.1%	6,011	45.9%	13,085
Green Lake	5,850	74.0%	2,051	26.0%	7,901
Iowa	4,553	50.7%	4,424	49.3%	8,977
Iron	1,743	65.1%	935	34.9%	2,678
Jackson	4,418	63.8%	2,504	36.2%	6,922
Jefferson	19,918	65.1%	10,687	34.9%	30,605
Juneau	5,717	68.5%	2,625	31.5%	8,342
Kenosha	29,676	59.2%	20,490	40.8%	50,166
Kewaunee	6,450	72.9%	2,399	27.1%	8,849
La Crosse	21,327	50.2%	21,175	49.8%	42,502
Lafayette	3,624	62.8%	2,149	37.2%	5,773
Langlade	5,856	68.3%	2,724	31.7%	8,580
Lincoln	7,129	66.1%	3,661	33.9%	10,790
Manitowoc	22,442	70.1%	9,572	29.9%	32,014
Marathon	31,675	65.0%	17,054	35.0%	48,729
Marinette	12,192	72.8%	4,554	27.2%	16,746
Marquette	4,152	67.5%	2,003	32.5%	6,155
Menominee	507	53.1%	448	46.9%	955
Milwaukee	172,548	55.0%	141,453	45.0%	314,001
Monroe	8,871	66.2%	4,525	33.8%	13,396
Oconto	10,222	71.1%	4,165	28.9%	14,387
Oneida	9,356	59.1%	6,478	40.9%	15,834
Outagamie	42,849	62.6%	25,631	37.4%	68,480
Ozaukee	25,914	63.5%	14,916	36.5%	40,830
Pepin	2,106	70.3%	889	29.7%	2,995
Pierce	8,350	59.5%	5,673	40.5%	14,023
Polk	10,619	69.2%	4,733	30.8%	15,352
Portage	15,409	53.7%	13,285	46.3%	28,694
Price	3,944	63.6%	2,259	36.4%	6,203
Racine	43,869	63.8%	24,868	36.2%	68,737
Richland	3,939	61.6%	2,454	38.4%	6,393
Rock	30,220	55.6%	24,087	44.4%	54,307
Rusk	3,848	66.8%	1,916	33.2%	5,764
St. Croix	16,668	63.1%	9,749	36.9%	26,417
Sauk	12,394	57.1%	9,310	42.9%	21,704
Sawyer	4,245	67.1%	2,082	32.9%	6,327
Shawano	11,333	72.6%	4,279	27.4%	15,612
Sheboygan	32,908	70.3%	13,895	29.7%	46,803
Taylor	4,741	66.3%	2,414	33.7%	7,155
Trempealeau	5,996	63.4%	3,466	36.6%	9,462
Vernon	6,253	61.6%	3,901	38.4%	10,154
Vilas	6,386	61.8%	3,953	38.2%	10,339
Walworth	20,501	61.8%	12,652	38.2%	33,153
Washburn	4,465	68.0%	2,097	32.0%	6,562
Washington	38,759	73.7%	13,804	26.3%	52,563
Waukesha	118,736	68.3%	55,165	31.7%	173,901
Waupaca	13,281	69.6%	5,810	30.4%	19,091
Waushara	6,168	68.5%	2,833	31.5%	9,001
Winnebago	37,188	57.7%	27,228	42.3%	64,416
Wood	19,441	66.7%	9,723	33.3%	29,164
Totals	1,264,310	59.4%	862,924	40.6%	2,127,234

== Effects ==
The amendment, which took effect on November 7, 2006, constitutionally banned same-sex marriages, which were never recognized by the state and was statutorily banned since 1979, and civil unions or civil union equivalents, which were never recognized by the state. Wisconsin became the 21st US state to ban same-sex marriage in its constitution and 14th US state to ban civil unions or civil union equivalents in its constitution. This preempted the state judiciary from requiring the state to legally recognize same-sex marriages or civil unions or civil union equivalents and preempted the Wisconsin Legislature from enacting a statute legalizing same-sex marriages or civil unions or civil union equivalents. Domestic partnerships in Wisconsin, legal statewide for state employees only and 1 county and 3 municipalities at the time, were unaffected by the amendment. In 2009, Wisconsin would enact statewide domestic partnerships for everyone, which would later be repealed in 2018.

== Legal challenge ==
In April 2009 the Wisconsin Supreme Court was asked in McConkey v. Van Hollen to rule on whether the 2006 Referendum 1 was constitutional. William McConkey, a political science instructor, claimed that the measure violated the state's constitution because it proposed more than one question in a single ballot proposal, which is impermissible under Wisconsin law. On June 30, 2010, the Court ruled that the amendment referendum question was permissible and thus the amendment had been properly passed. In 2014, the ACLU filed a lawsuit, Wolf v. Walker, to challenge the amendment and a federal judge agreed. On June 6, 2014, the United States District Court for the Western District of Wisconsin overturned all bans on same-sex marriage in the state. On October 6, 2014, same sex marriage was legalized in Wisconsin.

== Pre-decision opinion polls ==
Date of opinion poll	Conducted by	Sample size	In favor	Against	Undecided	Margin	Margin of Error	Source
October 2006	St. Norbert College	?	51%	44%	?	7% pro	?	
September 2006	Diversified Research for wispolitics.com	?	53%	39%	?	14% pro	?	
