= Donna Hoffman =

American academic administrator

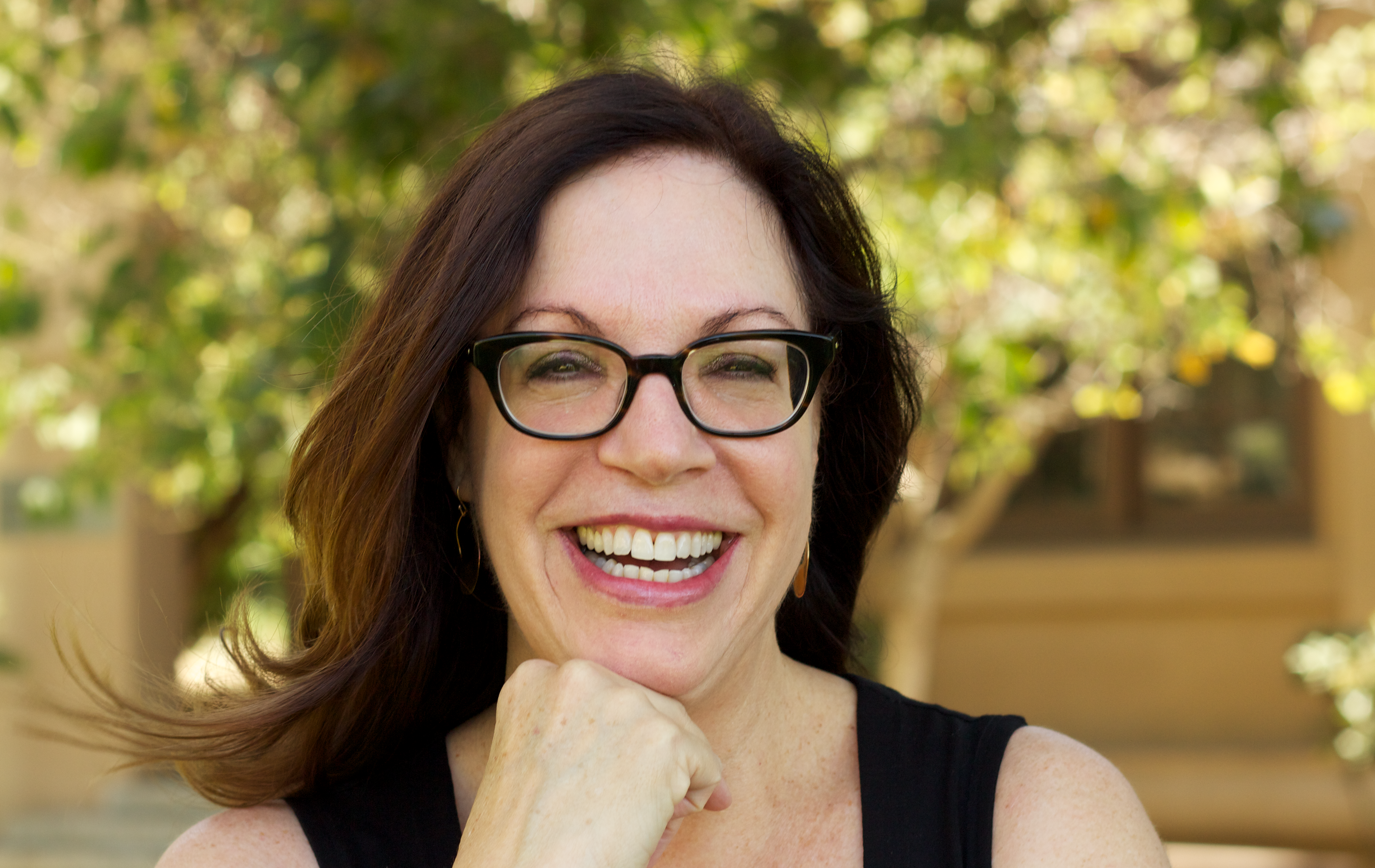

Academic background
- Education: University of California, Davis; University of North Carolina

Academic work
- Discipline: Center for the Connected Consumer
- Institutions: The George Washington University

Donna Hoffman is the Louis Rosenfeld Distinguished Scholar and Professor of Marketing at the School of Business at The George Washington University. She is the co–founder of eLab, an online laboratory for consumer behavior research and the Co–Director of the Center for the Connected Consumer.

== Academic career ==
Hoffman has a B.A degree from the University of California at Davis, and an M.A. and Ph.D. from the L. L. Thurstone Psychometric Laboratory at the University of North Carolina at Chapel Hill.

== Research ==
Her award–winning research focuses on online consumer behavior, Internet marketing strategy, and consumer perceptions and implications of emerging technology including the IoT and AI. She has published widely in the top marketing and management journals and speaks frequently on the topic of online marketing strategy. Hoffman was awarded the prestigious William O'Dell Award for long-term research impact and is the recipient of the Sheth Foundation/Journal of Marketing Award for her long-term contributions to the marketing discipline.
