= School-based health centers =

School-based health centers (SBHCs) are primary care clinics based on primary and secondary school campuses in the United States. Most SBHCs provide a combination of primary care, mental health care, substance abuse counseling, case management, dental health, nutrition education, health education and health promotion. An emphasis is placed on prevention and early intervention. School-based health centers generally operate as a partnership between the school district and a community health organization, such as a community health center, hospital, or the local health department. Most SBHCs report that the majority of their student population is eligible for the National School Lunch program, a common indicator of low socioeconomic status.

== History ==
In 1894, New York City officials initiated the first school health program in the U.S. Its purpose was to assess and, if needed, exclude children with contagious diseases from the classroom. In 1902, the program expanded and employed the nation's first school nurse. As school health programs spread across the country, health screening and communicable disease control were their principal focus.

President Lyndon Johnson’s War on Poverty in the mid-1960s is credited with bringing into focus the significance of health issues among impoverished school-age children. The enactment of Medicaid in 1965 was indicative of a perception in the public policy community that there was a need to develop programs in service of better health care for low-income individuals, including children.

In 1967, Philip J. Porter, head of pediatrics at Cambridge City Hospital in Massachusetts and director of Maternal and Child Health for the city's health department, began to address this issue. He assigned a nurse practitioner to work on site in an elementary school to deliver primary medical care to enrollees. Four additional health clinics were opened in Cambridge schools in the years that followed.

The first school-based health centers opened in Cambridge, Massachusetts (1967), Dallas, Texas (1970), and St. Paul, Minnesota (1973). The first two were launched because their founders believed that school-based health care could provide accessible, affordable health care to poor children. In 1970, the West Dallas Youth Center at Pinkston High School was opened as an outreach center for a federally funded Children and Youth Program based in the University of Texas Health Sciences Center Pediatrics Department. Pinkston High School was the nation's first high school to offer comprehensive care provided by nurse practitioners, physicians, social workers, nutritionists, and health educators.

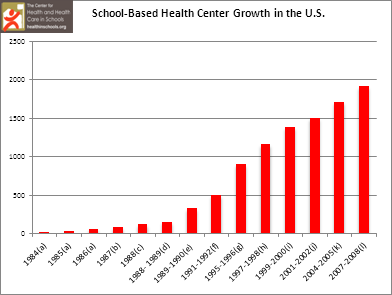
School-Based Health Center Growth in the U.S. from 1984 to 2008

In 1978, funding through the Robert Wood Johnson Foundation spurred an increase in the number of centers throughout the United States. These early centers demonstrated they were effective in increasing young people's access to care. The role of the pediatric nurse practitioner (PNP) as an advanced practice nurse with skills to provide primary health care to children began to emerge. With a seed grant of $7,000, the first school nurse practitioner certification program was established at the University of Colorado in the late 1960s in response to public dissatisfaction with the limited role of the school nurse and the recognized need for on-site school health.

== School nurses in SBHCs ==
School nurses are an essential part of SBHC's because they help prevent and reduce student absences in the educational institutions they are attending. The primary purpose of a school nurse is to ensure that students are healthy while maintaining good attendance. School nurses in SBHC's display seven different characteristics that allow them to help students excel academically. A school nurse provides direct care to students, leadership for the facility of health services, screening and referral for health conditions, promotes health, and serves as a connection between parents, students, health care professionals and the larger community. The health services offered by the schools is determined by the different school districts. School nurses should provide certain services that meet the minimum requirement according to the American Academy of Pediatrics (AAP). The minimum requirements include

1. care for students with special health care needs
2. plan for managing emergencies
3. health screening programs
4. verification of immunizations
5. infectious disease reports
6. a system to identify students chronic health care needs that can impact their educational achievement

== Current status ==
In the past 40 years, school-based health centers have grown from a handful to 1,909 in 45 states. The initial survey in 1985, conducted by the Center for Population Options (now known as Advocates for Youth), reported 35 centers nationwide. Follow-up surveys by The Center for Health and Health Care in Schools (previously known as the Making the Grade National Program Office ) continued to document SBHC growth through the 1990s and early 2000s. Since the late 1990s, the National Assembly on School-Based Health Care (NASBHC) has conducted a nationwide census of individual centers tri-annually, every 3 years.

== Demographics and characteristics ==
SBHCs serve all school-levels: in elementary schools (20%), middle/junior high schools (15%), high schools (30%) and a mix of elementary, middle, and high schools (21%). They are located in urban (59%), rural (27%), and suburban (14%) communities in all regions of the country. The centers often tailor their services and outreach specifically to the school's student population. Seventy percent of the student body in schools with SBHCs are minorities. They include Hispanic/Latino (36.8%), Black (non-Hispanic/Latino) (26.2%), Asian/Pacific Islander (4.4%), Native American/Alaskan Native (1.7%) and “other” (1.4%) youth. Facilities are staffed by one or more different types of health care providers, including nurse practitioners, physician assistants, social workers, substance abuse counselors, and mental health professionals.

== Controversy ==
Despite the growing number of school-based health care during the past three decades, the issue of providing reproductive health care at school-based health centers continues to spark controversy. Data has demonstrated how these controversies about reproductive health may frame more general concerns about school-based care. In response to these issues, in recent years SBHCs have begun requiring parents to sign written consents for their children to receive the full array of services the centers provide. Most facilities have an advisory board consisting of community representatives, parents, youth, and family organizations to provide planning and oversight.

== Funding ==
Historically, federal funding for school-based health centers came primarily from the maternal and child health block grant and the Healthy Schools/Healthy Communities program. However, as SBHCs have begun to focus on third-party reimbursement, Medicaid has also become an important source of support. The Center for Health and Health Care in Schools, a grant program of the Robert Wood Johnson Foundation, assisted states over the past two decades in developing the long-term financing policies required to sustain school-based health centers.

About 20 percent of SBHCs receive funding through the Health Resources and Services Administration (HRSA) Health Center Program, a division of the United States Department of Health and Human Services. Other funding is derived from various sources such as community-based health centers, healthcare systems, foundation grants, and state and local funds.

In July 2011, $95 million was awarded to 278 school-based health center programs nationwide, as part of the Patient Protection and Affordable Care Act(PPACA). This was the first award in a series of allocations to the School-Based Health Center Capital Program. PPACA's allocations for this program will ultimately total $200 million in funding for SBHCs over four years. The awards will enable recipients to expand their offerings and to increase their collective capacity by over 50 percent.

== Outcomes ==
Researchers have examined the impact of SBHCs across a number of health and education domains.

- Access to care: Children with the greatest unmet need, including uninsured students, benefit most from SBHC services. SBHCs appear to have a significant ability to reduce health care access disparities among African Americans and disabled students. The Bienestar Health Program has strong evidence that supports its ability to increase positive health behaviors and reduce risk factors for type 2 diabetes among Mexican-American and other at-risk youth. In Chicago, the Rush University College of Nursing operates health centers inside three public schools, providing convenient, comprehensive reproductive and sexual health services to students who are primarily African-American. Though recent research findings indicate that students with health and behavioral health needs are utilizing services, racial disparities exist; Asian students have been found to be less likely to access services than their Black and Latino peers.
- Clinical services: School-based health centers facilitate immunization services for adolescents with greater efficiency than community health centers. Children living with asthma benefit greatly from school-based health center services, as evidenced by fewer emergency room visits and reduced activity restriction. Children with asthma served also have improved attendance in school. Research has also shown SBHCs to be effective in working with adolescents who demonstrate depressive symptoms, use substances, and engage in sexual activity.
- Educational Impact: SBHCs aid in reducing school absences and promoting healthy behaviors. In Connecticut, 96.7 percent of students using school-based centers return to class the same day. In a study of youth in the San Francisco Unified School District, results suggest students' use of SBHCs is associated with positive academic outcomes, particularly through the students’ self-reported perceptions of school assets and having a caring relationship with an adult SBHC employee.
- Cost-savings: SBHCs result in cost-savings for Medicaid due to reduced emergency room use and hospitalizations.

== See also ==
- School-Based Health Alliance
