= WisPolitics =

American online magazine

Wispolitics.com
- Available in: English
- Headquarters: Madison, Wisconsin, United States
- Owner: The Capital Times Company
- Creators: Phil Prange and Jeff Mayers
- Editor: J.R. Ross
- Website: www.wispolitics.com
- Commercial: Yes
- Launched: 1999; 27 years ago

Wispolitics.com, sometimes styled as WisPolitics.com, is an online magazine and news service covering political and governmental news in Wisconsin. It issues hourly updates on daily events, political press releases, and political news.

WisPolitics Publishing, Inc., based in Madison, Wisconsin, was founded in 1999 by Phil Prange and Jeff Mayers. Mayers was the former capitol bureau chief of the Wisconsin State Journal. Prange was a political consultant and businessman, who had worked for Tommy Thompson. Mayers was the president and Prange served as publisher from 1999 until 2011. On February 3, 2011 Wispolitics announced that it had been acquired by The Capital Times. Mayers continues as president and J.R. Ross, formerly of the Associated Press, is editor-in-chief.

The core products of the service are daily political news summaries and weekly in-depth political reports delivered via e-mail, which are available by subscription. The company reports 120,000 monthly unique users on its sites.

WisPolitics.com company employs 10 people, including editors, reporters, programmers, and sales people. In 2004, the company expanded into Iowa by creating IowaPolitics.com.

WisPolitics conducts state political straw-polls at each of the Republican and Democratic party state conventions. In conjunction with the University of Wisconsin–Madison, they also conduct statewide voter polls.

== Sponsor of Wisconsin debates ==
WisPolitics has been a frequent sponsor of Wisconsin's statewide candidate debates since 2005. It has sponsored gubernatorial, attorney general, and Supreme Court debates. Monthly newsmaker luncheons are held by WisPolitics in Madison and Washington, D.C. These feature legislative leadership, constitutional officers, and U.S. Congressional Representatives and Senators. Although aimed primarily at subscribers, they are open to the public.

== Notable events in the history of WisPolitics ==
- May 1, 2000: Site is launched
- July 1, 2002: Sister site WisOpinion.com is launched
- December 1, 2002: Sister site WisBusiness.com is launched
- February 3, 2011: Wispolitics acquired by The Capital Times newspaper
