= List of centers and research institutes at George Washington University =

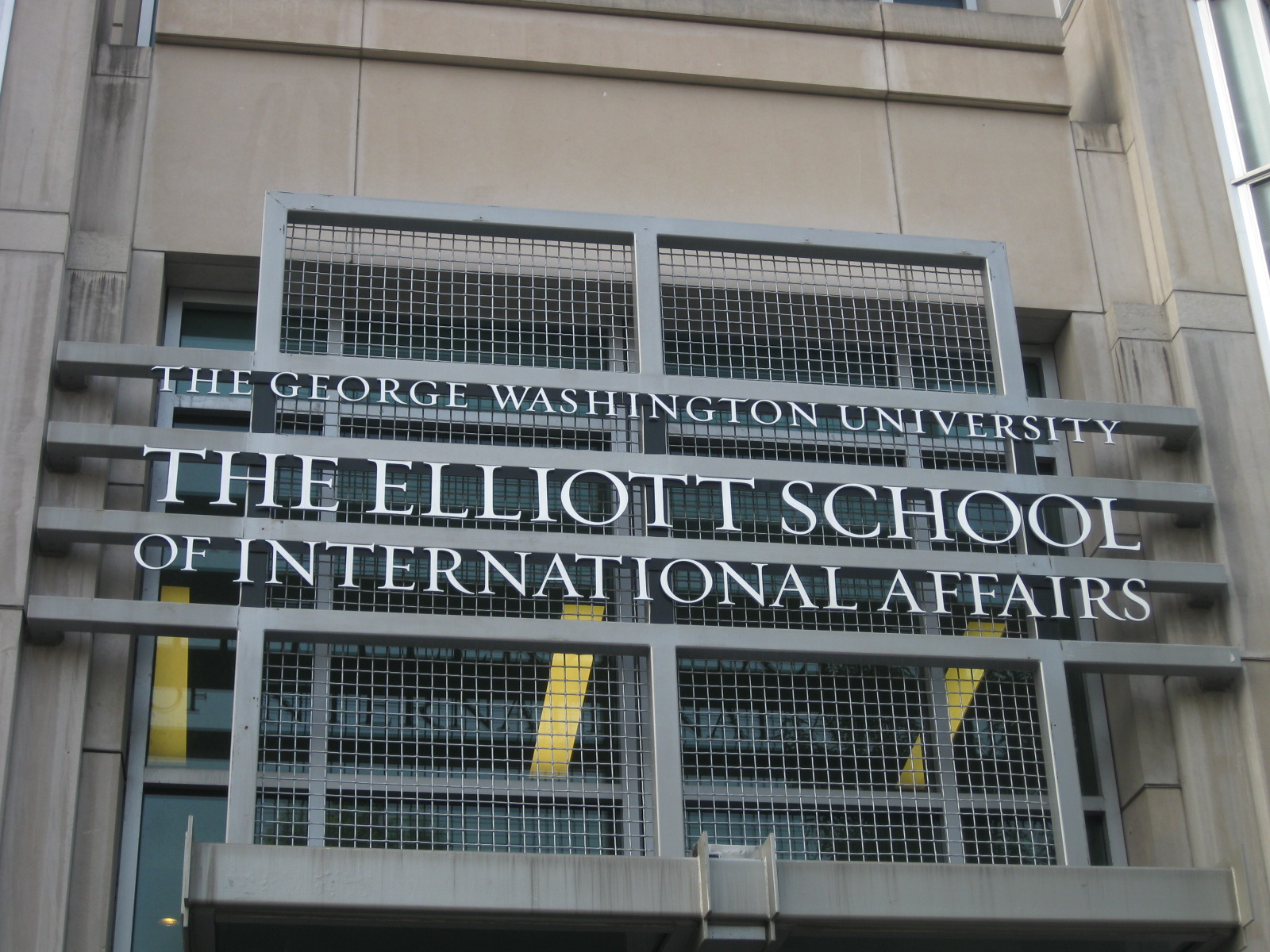
Several centers and research institutes are part of GW's Elliott School of International Affairs.

A number of research centers and institutes are based at George Washington University (GW), a university in the Washington, D.C., in the United States. Among these are:

== List of chartered centers and institutes listed by the GW's Office of the Vice President for Research ==
The following are listed by GW's Office of the Vice President for Research as listed chartered centers and institutes at GW.

Name	Associated School	Description
ACCESS, School Success for English Language Learners, Institute on	Graduate School of Education and Human Development	
Advancement of Research in Distance Education, Center for	Graduate School of Education and Human Development	
Aging, Health, and Humanities, Center for	School of Nursing	
Applied Developmental Science & Neuroeducation, Center for	Graduate School of Education and Human Development	
Asian Studies, Sigur Center for	Elliott School of International Affairs	Founded in September 1991 as an outgrowth of the Institute for Sino-Soviet Studies. It "promotes research and policy analysis on East Asia, Northeast Asia, Southeast Asia and South Asia through an active program of publishing, teaching, public events and policy engagement." The center is named for Gaston J. Sigur, Jr. (1924–1995).
Biomedical Engineering, Institute for	School of Engineering and Applied Sciences	
Biomedical Sciences, GW Institute for	School of Medicine and Health Sciences	
Biomimetics and Bioinspired Engineering, GW Center for	Columbian College of Arts and Sciences; School of Engineering and Applied Sciences	
Biostatistics Center	Milken Institute School of Public Health	Biostatistics center established in 1972 as part of the university's Department of Statistics. The center designs, executes, and analyzes multi-center clinical trials and epidemiologic medical investigations. The center is "presently funded at over $50 million per year as the statistical center for 17 research projects," almost all of them funded by the National Institutes of Health. The center has 110 employees.
Cancer Institute, GW	School of Medicine and Health Sciences	
Capitol Archaeological Institute, GW	Columbian College of Arts and Sciences	Affiliated with the Department of Classical and Near Eastern Languages and Civilizations. Its director is GWU professor of archaeology Eric H. Cline. The institute conduct fieldwork at various sites, including Megiddo and Tel Kabri in Israel; Bir Madkhur, Jordan; the Say Kah Maya center in Belize; Koobi Fora in Kenya; and Oaxaca in Mexico.
Communitarian Policy Studies, Institute for	Columbian College of Arts and Sciences	
Competition Law Center	School of Law	
Complex Litigation and Civil Procedure, James F. Humphreys Center for	School of Law	
Computational Biology Institute	Office of the Vice President for Research	
Computer Graphics, Institute for	School of Engineering and Applied Sciences	
Coregulator Biology, Institute of	School of Medicine and Health Sciences	
Corporate Responsibility, Institute for	School of Business	
Crash Analysis Center, National	School of Engineering and Applied Sciences	
Crisis, Disaster and Risk Management, Institute for	School of Engineering and Applied Sciences	
Cyber Center for National & Economic Security	Office of the Vice President for Research	
Cyber Security Policy & Research Institute	School of Engineering and Applied Sciences	
DC Metro Tobacco Research and Instruction Consortium (MeTRIC)	Milken Institute School of Public Health	
Documentary Center	Columbian College of Arts and Sciences	Part of the Center for Innovative Media within the GW's School of Media and Public Affairs. It sponsors a programs devoted to documentary education, production, and exhibition. Nina Gilden Seavey is the founder and director of the center. The center was established in 1990.
Economic Research, Center for	Columbian College of Arts and Sciences	
Education Policy, Center on	Graduate School of Education and Human Development	
Eleanor Roosevelt Papers Project	Columbian College of Arts and Sciences	
Emergency Medicine, Ronald Reagan Institute of	School of Medicine and Health Sciences	
Equity and Excellence in Education, Center for	Graduate School of Education and Human Development	
Ethnographic Research, Institute for	Columbian College of Arts and Sciences	
European, Russian, and Eurasian Studies, Institute for		
European Union Research Center	Elliott School of International Affairs; School of Business	
Evaluation Effectiveness, Midge Smith Center for	Columbian College of Arts and Sciences	
Excellence in Public Leadership, Center for	College of Professional Studies	
First Federal Congress Project	Columbian College of Arts and Sciences	
Global Health, Center for	Milken Institute School of Public Health	
Global and International Studies, Institute for	Elliott School of International Affairs	
Global Center for Political Engagement	College of Professional Studies	
Global Media Institute	Office of the Vice President for Research	
Global Women's Institute	Office of the Vice President for Research	
Health Care Quality, Center for	Milken Institute School of Public Health	
Health Policy Forum, National	Office of the Vice President for Research	
Health Policy Research, Center for	Milken Institute School of Public Health	
Health Workforce Research Center, GW	Milken Institute School of Public Health	
Homeland Security Policy Institute	Office of the Vice President for Research	
Human Paleobiology, Center for the Advanced Study of	Columbian College of Arts and Sciences	The Center for the Advanced Study of Human Paleobiology (CASHP) describes mission as "to undertake research that addresses fundamental problems in human evolution." Faculty come from multiple GW departments. CASHP also houses GW's human paleobiology graduate program. The center contains seven laboratories: Evolutionary Neuroscience, Hard Tissue Biology, Hominid Paleobiology, Primate Behavioral Ecology, Primate Genomics, Social Cognition, and Stone Age Archaeology.
Immigrants in America, Institute for	Columbian College of Arts and Sciences	
Injury Prevention and Control, Center for	School of Medicine and Health Sciences	
Innovative Media, Center for	Columbian College of Arts and Sciences	
Integrating Statistics in Decision Sciences, Institute for	School of Business	
Intellectual Property Studies, Dean Dinwoodey Center for	School of Law	
Intelligent Systems Research, Center for	School of Engineering and Applied Sciences	
International Economic Policy, Institute for	Elliott School of International Affairs	The Institute for International Economic Policy (IIEP) houses GW's master's programs in International Trade and Investment Policy (ITIP) and International Development Studies (IDS). The institute has four "signature initiatives": Climate Adaptation in Developing Countries, Ultra-poverty Initiative, Global Economic Governance for the 21st Century, and "G2 at GW" series on China's Economic Development and U.S.-China Economic Relations. Stephen C. Smith is the current director.
International Science and Technology Policy, Center for	Elliott School of International Affairs	
Latino Health Research Center	Columbian College of Arts and Sciences	
Law, Economics, and Finance, Center for (C-LEAF)	School of Law	
Magnetics Research, Institute for	School of Engineering and Applied Sciences	
Massively Parallel Applications and Computing Technology, GW Institute for (IMPACT)	Columbian College of Arts and Sciences; School of Engineering and Applied Sciences	See massively parallel (computing).
Materials Science, Institute for	Columbian College of Arts and Sciences	
Mathematical Sciences, Institute for	Columbian College of Arts and Sciences	
Medieval and Early Modern Studies Institute, GW	Columbian College of Arts and Sciences	
MEMS and VLSI Technologies, Institute for	School of Engineering and Applied Sciences	
Middle East Studies, Institute for	Columbian College of Arts and Sciences; Elliott School of International Affairs	
Mind-Brain Institute, GW	Columbian College of Arts and Sciences	
Nanotechnology, Institute for	Columbian College of Arts and Sciences; School of Engineering and Applied Sciences; School of Medicine and Health Sciences	
Neuroscience, GW Institute for	Columbian College of Arts and Sciences; School of Medicine and Health Sciences	
Nuclear Studies, GW Institute for	Columbian College of Arts and Sciences	
Preparedness & Resilience, Center for	Office of the Vice President for Research	
Proteomics Technology and Applications, W. M. Keck Institute for	Columbian College of Arts and Sciences; School of Medicine and Health Sciences	See proteomics.
Public Diplomacy & Global Communication, The Institute for	Columbian College of Arts and Sciences; Elliott School of International Affairs	
Public Policy, The George Washington Institute of	Office of the Vice President for Research	
Quantum Computing, Information, Logic & Topology, Center for	Columbian College of Arts and Sciences	
Rehabilitation Counseling Research and Education, Center for	Graduate School of Education and Human Development	
Regulatory Studies Center	Columbian College of Arts and Sciences	
Reliability and Risk Analysis, Institute for	Columbian College of Arts and Sciences	
Risk Science and Public Health, Center for	Milken Institute School of Public Health	
Security and Conflict Studies, Institute for	Elliott School of International Affairs	
Social Well-Being and Development, Center for	Milken Institute School of Public Health	
Solar Institute, The GW	Columbian College of Arts and Sciences; School of Business; School of Law; School of Engineering and Applied Sciences	
Space Policy Institute	Elliott School of International Affairs	
Spirituality and Health, GW Institute for	School of Medicine and Health Sciences	
Sustainability Research, Education and Policy, Institute for	School of Business	
Urban and Environmental Research, Center for	Columbian College of Arts and Sciences	
Washington Area Studies, Center for	Office of the Vice President for Research	

== Other GW centers and research institutes ==
- The Center for Health and Health Care in Schools (CHHCS) is a "nonpartisan policy analysis and program-development research center" at GWU's Milken Institute School of Public Health (formerly the School of Public Health and Health Services). Primarily funded by the Robert Wood Johnson Foundation, the center "has been a leader in the development of school-based health center programs for children for more than twenty years and is the current incarnation of the Making the Grade Program that began funding school-based health centers in the 1980." In addition to its research and demonstration grant programs related to school-based health centers, the center has conducted research and organized programs on school mental health programs and school oral health programs. CHHCS was previously known as the School-Based Adolescent Health Care Program National Program Office (1987–1992) and the Making the Grade National Program Office (1993–2000).
- The Center for the Connected Consumer (CCC) at the George Washington University School of Business is co-directed by Donna Hoffman and Tom Novak, both professors of marketing at GW. The CCC says that it "is dedicated to understanding how consumers interact with smart devices in post-social media environments."
- The George Washington University Heart & Vascular Institute (formerly the Richard B. and Lynne V. Cheney Cardiovascular Institute) is part of GW's School of Medicine & Health Sciences. In fiscal year 2014, the center reported slightly over $5 million in total research support. Richard J. Katz, M.D., Walter A. Bloedorn Professor of Medicine at GW, directs the center.
- The Institute for Politics, Democracy & the Internet is the research arm of GW's Graduate School of Political Management.
- The Jacobs Institute of Women's Health is part of GW's Milken Institute School of Public Health. It describes itself as "a nonprofit organization working to improve health care for women through research, dialogue, and information dissemination."
