= Domestic partnership in Wisconsin =

Domestic partnerships in Wisconsin afford limited rights to same-sex couples. They have been recognized in Wisconsin since August 3, 2009. Domestic partnerships in Wisconsin provide select rights, such as the ability to inherit a partner's estate in the absence of a will, hospital and jail visitation, and the ability to access family medical leave to care for a sick partner. Wisconsin's domestic partnership registry does not provide for two-parent adoptions by persons of the same sex, and it confers far fewer rights, duties and protections than are associated with marriage. Wisconsin ended its domestic partnership registry on April 1, 2018.

Wisconsin was the first state in the Midwest to enact any form of recognition for same-sex unions. Of the several states that had bans on same-sex marriage and civil unions, Wisconsin was the first and only one to enact limited domestic partnerships.

== Domestic partner registry ==
Wisconsin Governor Jim Doyle proposed legislation for same-sex partnerships in Wisconsin on February 17, 2009. On June 13, the Assembly passed, by vote of 50–48, a state budget that incorporated domestic partnerships for same-sex couples. The Senate passed the budget on June 17 by vote of 17–16. Doyle signed the budget legislation on June 29. The Domestic Partnership law took effect on August 3.

=== Enumerated rights ===
A domestic partnership can be registered at the county level, with couples having to sign a legal declaration of their commitment. To be eligible for a domestic partnership, two individuals must both be at least 18 years old, share a common residence, not be nearer of kin than second cousins, and neither party can be married or in another domestic partnership with anyone else.

Wisconsin's domestic partnership registry provides 43 rights and protections to same-sex couples, in contrast to more than 200 state-level rights and over 1,138 federal-level protections afforded to heterosexual couples. These rights include:

- Administration and transfer of deceased partner's estate
  - Ability to inherit partner's estate in the absence of a will
  - Priority with respect to certain personal property
  - Can be awarded the couple’s home and vehicles that are titled in the name of the deceased partner, as well as personal and household items of the deceased partner, by a probate court
  - Exempting certain property transferred to the surviving partner from creditors' claims
  - Family support during administration of a deceased individual's estate
  - Transfer of real estate titles without paying fee
  - Transfer of motor vehicle titles
- Other rights
  - Presumption of joint tenancy in real estate
  - Rights related to power of attorney for property and finances
  - Family leave for sick or dying partner
  - Hospital visitation
  - Jail and Prison visitation
  - Ability to admit incapacitated partner to nursing facility
  - Ability to access deceased or incapacitated partner's medical records
  - Ability to file suit for wrongful death
  - Right to receive death benefits if the deceased partner was killed in a workplace accident
  - Crime victim compensation
  - Immunity from testifying against partner
  - Ability to consent to autopsy for deceased partner
  - Ability to make anatomical donation in the event of partner's death

=== Lawsuit ===
On July 23, 2009, before the Domestic Partnership Law took effect, three members of Wisconsin Family Action (WFA) filed a petition for an original action in the Wisconsin Supreme Court, originally Appling v. Doyle, seeking a declaration that the domestic partner registry is unconstitutional under the state's Marriage Protection Amendment. WFA had been the primary advocate for that constitutional amendment. WFA said that the state's domestic partner registry creates a "legal status" substantially similar to marriage, while voters intended to preserve a "conjugal model" of marriage. WFA agreed that Wisconsin's domestic partner registry provides far fewer rights, duties, and protections than marriage, but contended that by granting "legal status" to same-sex couples the registry legislation violated the "intention of the voters".

When the Court declined to take the case, WFA filed its suit in Dane County District Court in 2010. The state hired outside counsel to defend the registry law, but on May 13, 2011, Governor Scott Walker asked to withdraw the state's defense of the domestic partnership registry. Fair Wisconsin, an LGBT advocacy organization, intervened to defend the registry, assisted by Lambda Legal.

On June 20, 2011, Dane County Judge Dan Moeser ruled that the domestic partnership registry does not violate the state constitution, finding that the state "does not recognize domestic partnership in a way that even remotely resembles how the state recognizes marriage". On December 20, 2012, a three-judge panel of the Fourth District Court of Appeals unanimously upheld Wisconsin's domestic partner registry, affirming Moeser's ruling. On July 31, 2014, in a unanimous decision, the Wisconsin Supreme Court upheld Wisconsin's domestic partnership registry. Their decision in the case, now known as Appling v. Walker, cited statements made by proponents of the constitutional amendment at issue "that the Amendment simply would not preclude a mechanism for legislative grants of certain rights to same-sex couples".

== See also ==
- Same-sex marriage in Wisconsin
- LGBT rights in Wisconsin
- Same-sex unions in the United States
- Domestic partnership in the United States
