= Immutable characteristic =

Physical attribute perceived as unchangeable

An immutable characteristic is any physical attribute perceived as unchangeable, entrenched, and innate. The term is often used to describe segments of the population that share such attributes and are contrasted with others by those attributes, and is used in human rights law to classify protected groups of people who should be protected from civil or criminal actions directed against those immutable characteristics.

For example, a legal debate about sexual orientation concerns whether it is a mutable or immutable characteristic. If it is immutable, then homosexuality, bisexuality, asexuality, heterosexuality, etc., are all immutable characteristics that naturally occur and cannot be changed. If it is mutable, then those characteristics can be changed.

== See also ==
- Suspect classification
- Immutability (theology)
