= Wilmington massacre =

1898 coup d'état in North Carolina, US

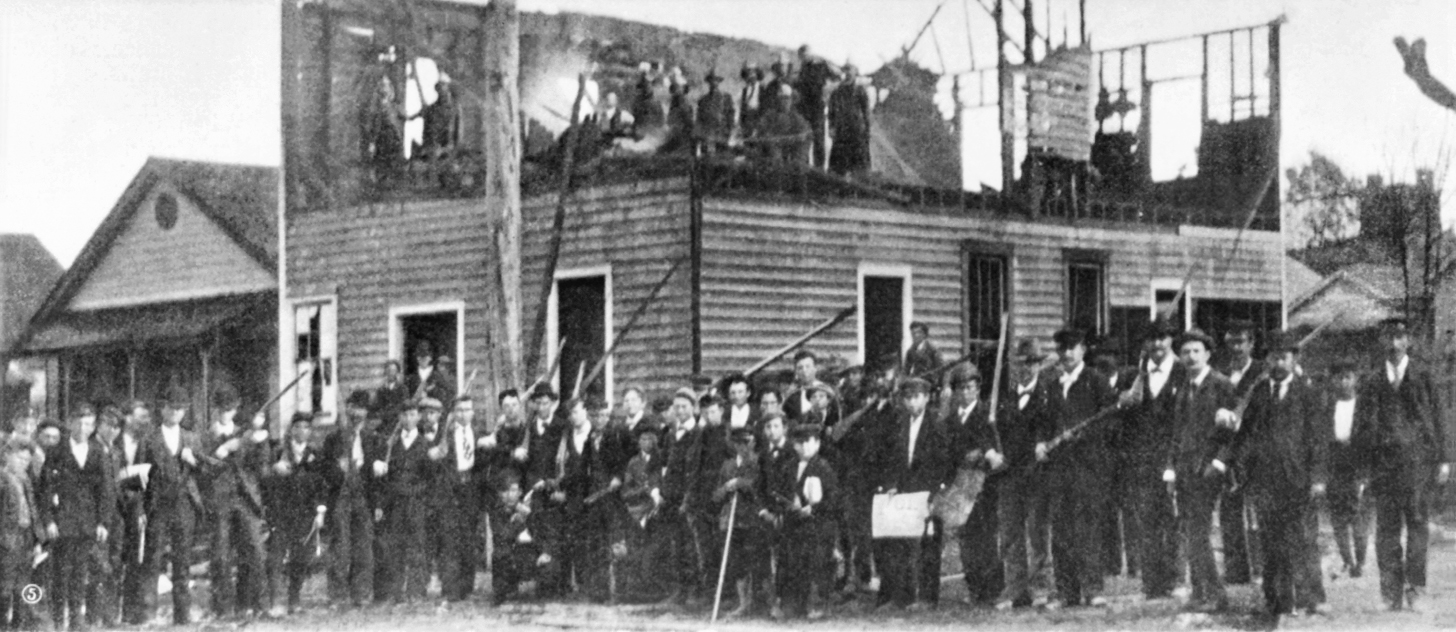
- Mob posing by the ruins of The Daily Record
- Location: Wilmington, North Carolina, US
- Date: November 10, 1898
- Target: Black residents; Black businesses; Elected Fusionists; The Daily Record newspaper
- Attack type: Arson; Assault; Murder; Political terrorism; Propaganda; Property damage/theft; Widespread intimidation
- Weapons: Gatling gun; Over 400 personal guns
- Deaths: est. 14–300 black residents killed
- Victims: est. 2,000 displaced black Americans; est. 20 Fusionists banished; Newspaper torched and gutted
- Perpetrators: "The Secret Nine," including Hugh MacRae; Charles Aycock; Josephus Daniels; William Kenan; Furnifold Simmons; Alfred M. Waddell
- Assailants: The Red Shirts; Mob of white civilians; Wilmington Light Infantry
- No. of participants: 2,000
- Motive: Shift in social, economic and political power during Reconstruction; Maintenance of Antebellum racial hierarchy; White supremacy; Government overthrow

The Wilmington massacre, also known as the Wilmington insurrection or the Wilmington coup, was a municipal-level coup d'état and a massacre that was carried out by white supremacists in Wilmington, North Carolina, United States, on November 10, 1898. The white press in Wilmington originally described the event as a race riot perpetrated by a mob of black people. In studies beginning in 2016, the event has been characterized as terrorism and a violent overthrow of a duly elected government by white supremacists.

The state's white Southern Democrats conspired to lead a mob of 2,000 white men to overthrow the legitimately elected Fusionist biracial government in Wilmington. They expelled opposition black and white political leaders from the city and destroyed the property and businesses of black citizens built since the American Civil War, including the only black newspaper in the city. At least 14 black people were killed; estimates of the actual toll run from 60 to more than 300. Many leaders of the coup remained important figures in North Carolina politics, some into the 1930s.

The Wilmington coup is considered a turning point in post-Reconstruction North Carolina politics. It was part of an era of more severe racial segregation and effective disenfranchisement of African Americans throughout the South, which had been underway since the passage of a new constitution in Mississippi in 1890 that raised barriers to the registration of black voters. Other states soon passed similar laws. Historian Laura F. Edwards writes, "What happened in Wilmington became an affirmation of white supremacy not just in that one city, but in the South and in the nation as a whole", as it affirmed that invoking "whiteness" eclipsed the legal citizenship, individual rights, and equal protection under the law that black Americans were guaranteed under the Fourteenth Amendment.

== Background ==
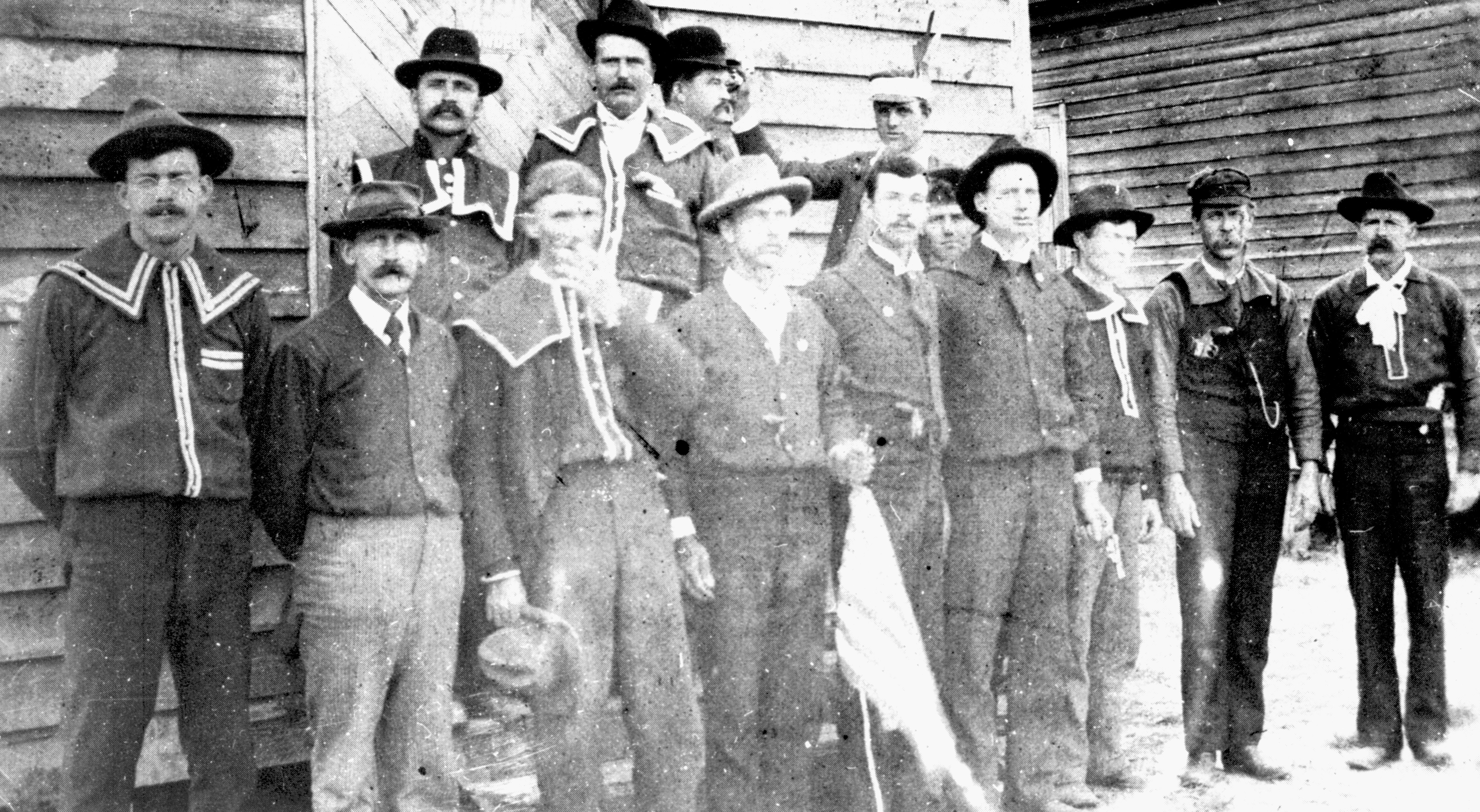
A group of "Red Shirts" at Old Hundred, North Carolina, on Election Day 1898

In 1860, just before the start of the American Civil War, Wilmington was North Carolina's largest city, with a population of nearly 10,000, most of whom were black. Numerous slaves and freedmen worked at the city's port, in households as domestic servants, and in a variety of jobs as artisans and skilled workers.

With the end of the war in 1865, freedmen who lived in many states left plantations and rural areas and moved to towns and cities to seek work, and they also attempted to gain safety by creating black communities without white supervision. Tensions grew in Wilmington and other areas because of a shortage of supplies; Confederate currency suddenly had no value and the South was impoverished following the end of the long war.

In 1868, North Carolina ratified the Fourteenth Amendment to the United States Constitution, resulting in the recognition of Reconstruction policies. The state legislature and governorship were dominated by Republican officials, with the governor a white man and the legislature made up of both white and black people. Freedmen were eager to vote and overwhelmingly supported the Republican Party that had emancipated them and given them citizenship and suffrage. However, conservative white Democrats, who had previously dominated politics in the state, greatly resented this "radical" change, which they deemed as being brought about by black residents, Unionist "carpetbaggers", and race traitors referred to as "scalawags".

Democrats developed a plan to subvert home rule, seeking to have local officials appointed by the state rather than elected by the people. They began circumventing legislation by taking over the state's judiciary and adopting 30 amendments to the state constitution, which effected widespread policy changes, including lowering the number of judges on the North Carolina Supreme Court, putting the lower courts and local governments under the control of the state legislature, rescinding the votes of certain types of criminals, mandating segregated public schools, outlawing interracial relationships, and granting the General Assembly the power to modify or nullify any local government. By adopting these elements, the Democrats became identified as would-be bastions for white Americans. However, their control was largely limited to the western part of the state, within counties where, demographically, there were relatively few black Americans.

As the Democrats chipped away at Republican rule, things came to a head with the 1876 gubernatorial campaign of Zebulon B. Vance, a former Confederate soldier and governor. Vance called the Republican Party "begotten by a scalawag out of a mulatto and born in an outhouse". Through Vance, the Democrats saw their biggest opening to begin implementing their agenda in the eastern part of the state.

However, in that region, poor white cotton farmers aligned themselves with the labor movement, with many of them joining the People's Party (also known as the Populists). In 1892, as the U.S. plunged into an economic depression, the Populists banded with black Republicans who shared their hardships, forming an interracial coalition with a platform of self-governance, free public education, and equal voting rights for black men, called the Fusion coalition. Republicans and Populists agreed jointly to support municipal candidates.

=== Wilmington ===
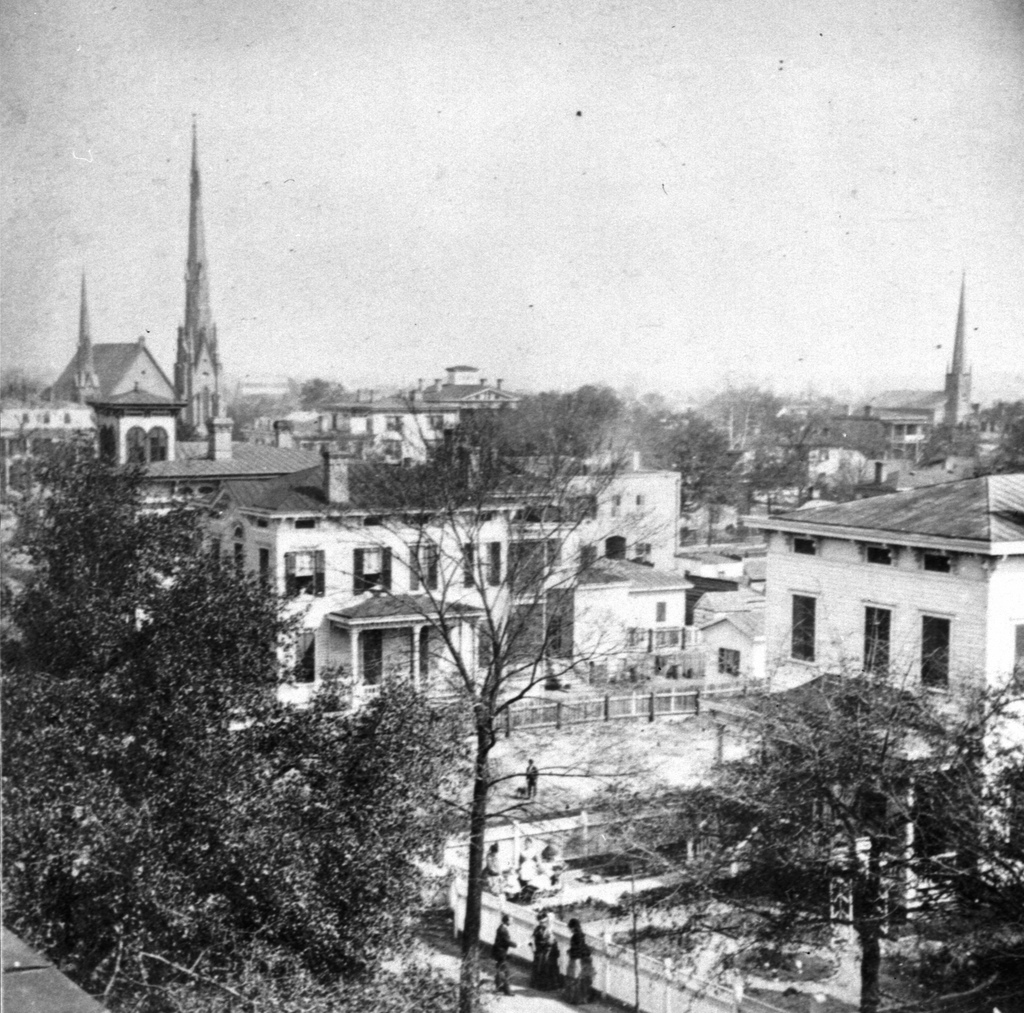
Wilmington, c. 1898

In the last decade of the 19th century, Wilmington, still the largest city in the state, continued to have a majority-black population, with 11,324 blacks and 8,731 whites in 1890. There were numerous black professionals and businessmen among them, and a rising middle class.

The Republican Party was biracial in membership. Unlike in many other jurisdictions, black people in Wilmington were elected to local office, and also gained prominent positions in the community. For example, three of the city's aldermen were black. Of the five members on the constituent board of audit and finance, one was black. Black people also served in the civic positions of justice of the peace, deputy clerk of court, and street superintendent, and as coroners, policemen, mail clerks, and mail carriers.

Blacks also held significant economic power in the city. Many former slaves had skills which they were able to use in the marketplace. For example, several became bakers, grocers, dyers, etc., making up nearly 35 percent of Wilmington's service positions.

Many black people began moving out of service jobs and into other types of employment. In Wilmington they accounted for over 30 percent of its skilled craftsmen, such as mechanics, carpenters, jewelers, watchmakers, plumbers, blacksmiths, masons, and so on. In addition, they owned ten of the city's 11 restaurants, a majority of the city's 22 barbershops, and one of the city's four fish and oyster dealerships. There were also more black bootmakers and shoemakers than white ones, one-third of the city's butchers were black, and half of the city's tailors were black. Two brothers, Alexander and Frank Manly, owned the Wilmington Daily Record, which was the only known black daily in the United States at the time. The paper described itself as "the only negro daily in the world".

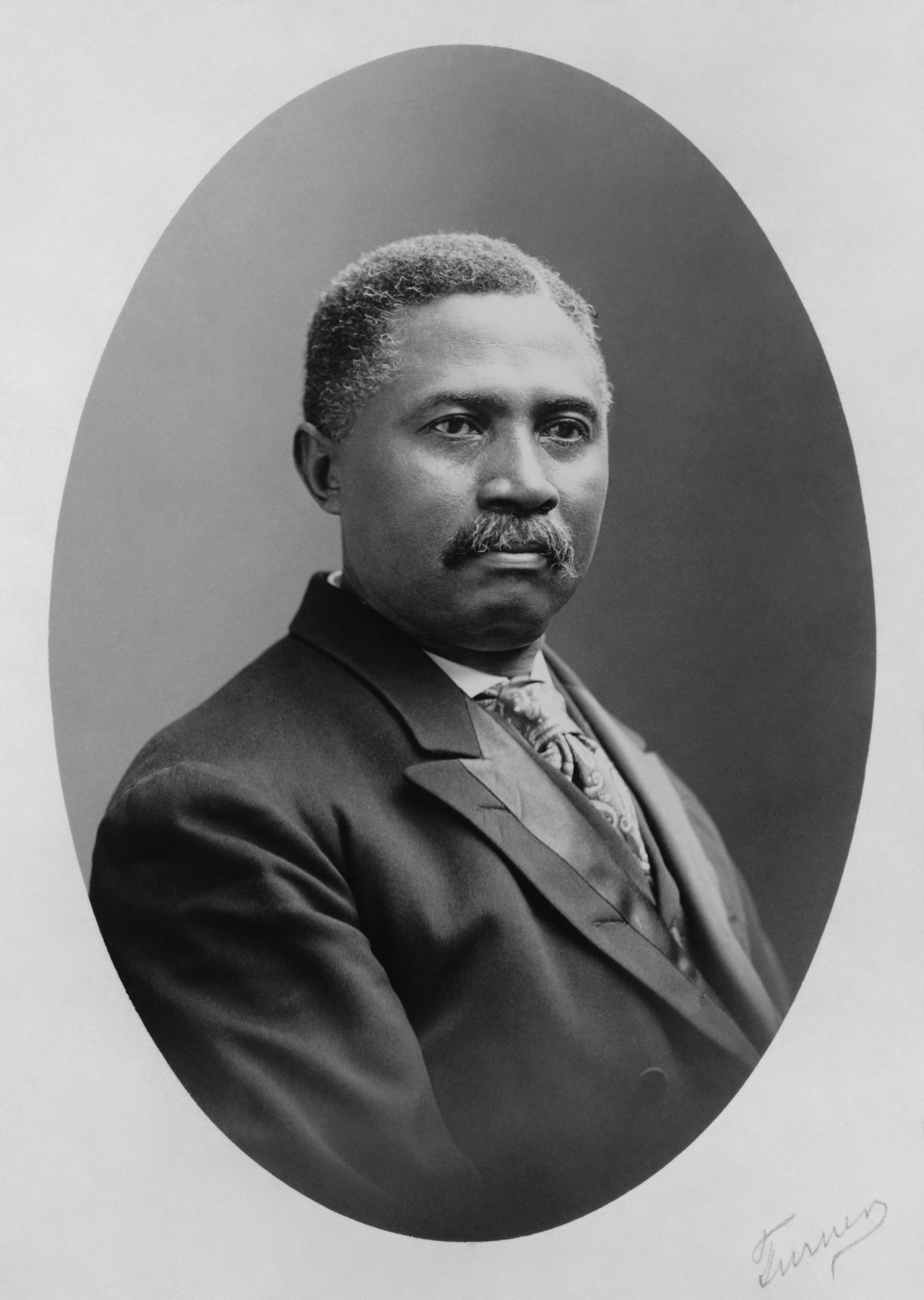
John C. Dancy

With the help of patronage and equitable hiring practices, some black people also held prominent business and leadership roles in the city, such as carpenter and school founder Frederick C. Sadgwar. Thomas C. Miller was one of the city's three real estate agents and auctioneers, and was also the only pawnbroker in the city, with many whites alleged to be indebted to him. In 1897, following the election of Republican President William McKinley, John C. Dancy was appointed to replace a prominent white Democrat as the U.S. collector of customs at the Port of Wilmington, at a salary of nearly US$4,000 (equivalent to $154,800 in 2025). The editor of the Wilmington Messenger often disparaged him by referring to Dancy as "Sambo of the Customs House". Black professionals increasingly supported each other. For example, of the more than 2,000 black professionals in North Carolina in that era, more than 95 percent were clergy or teachers, professions where they were not shut out from competing, unlike doctors and lawyers.

=== White resentment ===
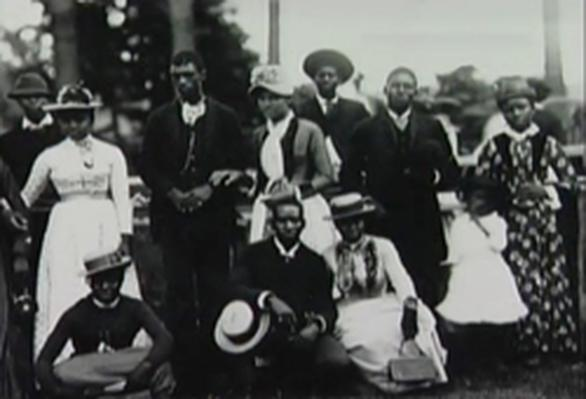
African Americans in Wilmington, 1898

As black people in the area rapidly emerged into their newfound social status and progressed economically, socially, and politically, racial tensions grew. Former slaves and their children had no inherited wealth. With the collapse of the Freedman's Bank, which had a Wilmington branch, in 1874, some black residents of Wilmington lost most of their savings and as a result, many distrusted banks. The debt-slave metaphor, well-known within the community, made many residents wary of debt. In addition, credit or loans available to them were marked up in price. The annual interest rate of credit charged to black people was nearly 15 percent, compared to under 7.5 percent for poor whites, and lenders refused to let African-Americans pay off their mortgages in installments. This practice, known as "principal or nothing", positioned lenders to take over black property and businesses through forced sales. The lack of inherited wealth, limitations of access to credit, and loss of savings through federal mismanagement and fraud, created a combined effect in which black people "could not save anything", or otherwise acquire the means to own taxable property.

Property ownership among black residents in Wilmington was rare, at less than ten per cent. Of nearly $6 million in real and personal property taxes, they paid less than $400,000 of this amount. And while the per capita wealth for whites in the city was around US$622 (equivalent to $24,071 in 2025), it was US$25.41 (equivalent to $983.37 in 2025) for black people.

Despite this, affluent whites believed that they were paying taxes in a disproportionate amount given the amount of property they owned, relative to the city's black residents, who now held the political power to prevent affluent whites from changing this ratio. Additionally, there was tension with poor, unskilled whites, who competed with African-Americans in the job market and found their services in less demand than skilled black labor. Black people were caught between not meeting the expectations of affluent whites and exceeding the expectations of poor whites, paradoxically progressing too fast and too slow at the same time in the eyes of white residents. An example of the view that blacks were "moving too slow" can be found in the following excerpt from an 1898 magazine article: "While thus numerically strong, the Negro is not a factor in the development of the city or section. With thirty years of freedom behind him and with an absolute equality of educational advantages with the whites, there is not today in Wilmington a single Negro savings bank or any other distinctively Negro educational or charitable institution; while the race has not produced a physician or lawyer of note. ... The Negro in North Carolina, ... is thriftless, improvident, does not accumulate money, and is not accounted a desirable citizen."

This sentiment was echoed even among whites who aligned politically with African-Americans, such as Republican governor Daniel L. Russell "An impression prevails that these colored people have grown greatly in wealth, that they have acquired homesteads, have become tax-payers and given great promise along these lines. It is not true. ... True, they may claim that this is all net gain as they started with no property. But they did not start with nothing. They started with enormous advantages over whites. They were accustomed to labor. The whites were not. They had been for generations the producers of the State and the whites the consumers. They were accustomed to hardship and privation and patient industry. They had the muscle. ...

Throughout the South, violence was perpetrated by portions of the white population against black citizens. This intimidation occurred after the Civil War and during Reconstruction in the midst of the post-war economic upheaval, when former slaves were competing with poorer white laborers.

=== Fusionist dominance ===
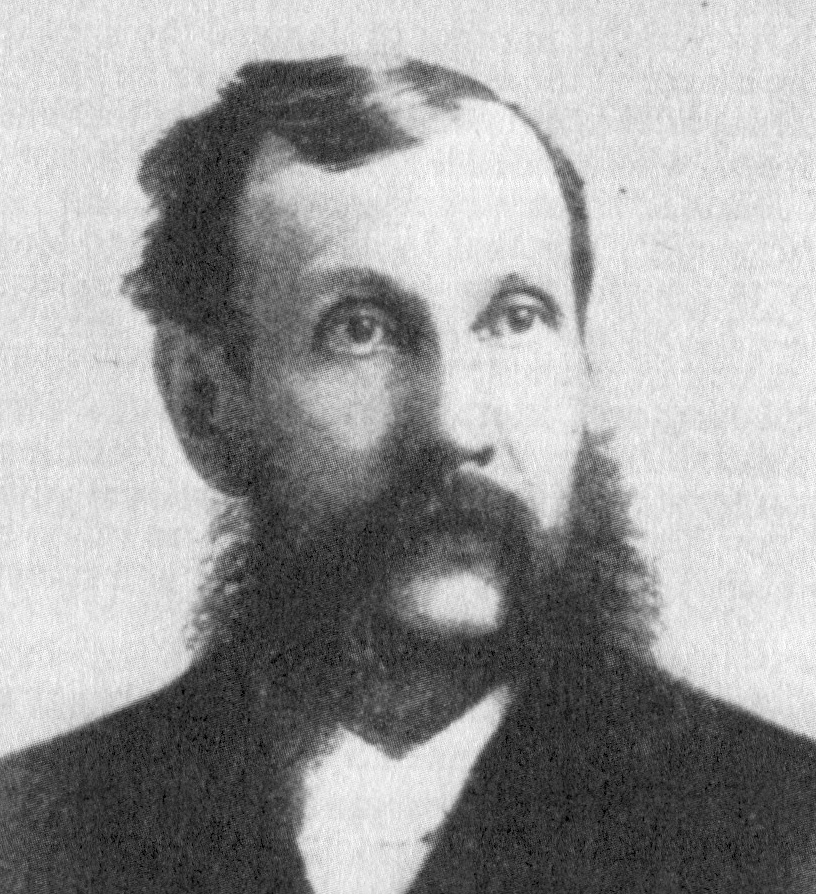
Mayor Silas P. Wright, 1890s

These dynamics continued with the elections of 1894 and 1896, in which the Republican-Populist Fusion ticket won every statewide office, including the governorship in the latter election, won by Daniel L. Russell. The Fusionists began dismantling the Democrats' political infrastructure, namely by reverting their appointed positions in local offices back to offices subject to popular elections. They also began trying to dismantle the Democratic stronghold in the less-populated western part of the state, which allowed the Democrats more political power through gerrymandering. The Fusionists also encouraged black citizens to vote, who constituted an estimated 120,000 Republican sympathizers.

By 1898, Wilmington's key political power was in the hands of "The Big Four", who were representative of the Fusion ticket: the mayor Dr. Silas P. Wright; the acting sheriff of New Hanover County, George Z. French; the postmaster, W. H. Chadbourn; and businessman, Flaviel W. Fosters, who wielded substantial support and influence with black voters. The "Big Four" worked in concert with a circle of patrons—made up of about 2,000 black voters and about 150 whites—known as "the Ring". The Ring included about 20 prominent businessmen, about six first- and second-generation New Englanders from families that had settled in the Cape Fear region before the War, and influential black families such as the Sampsons and the Howes. The Ring wielded political power using patronage, monetary support, and an effective press through the Wilmington Post and The Daily Record.

The Populists and Republicans in North Carolina did not get along completely, especially after the Populists actually fused with the Democrats at the presidential level in 1896 and endorsed liberal Democrat William Jennings Bryan for president. The Populists and Republicans disagreed on many national issues such as tariffs, the gold standard, and silver coinage; but the Republicans and Populists agreed on most state issues, such as voting rights and education spending.

This shift and consolidation of power horrified white Democrats, who contested the new laws, taking their grievances to the state Supreme Court, which did not rule in their favor. Defeated at the polls and in the courtroom, the Democrats, desperate to avoid another loss, became aware of discord between the Fusion alliance of black Republicans and white Populists, although it appeared that the Fusionists would sweep the upcoming elections of 1898, if voters voted on free coinage, railroad bonds scandal, and debt relief.

==== Issues ====
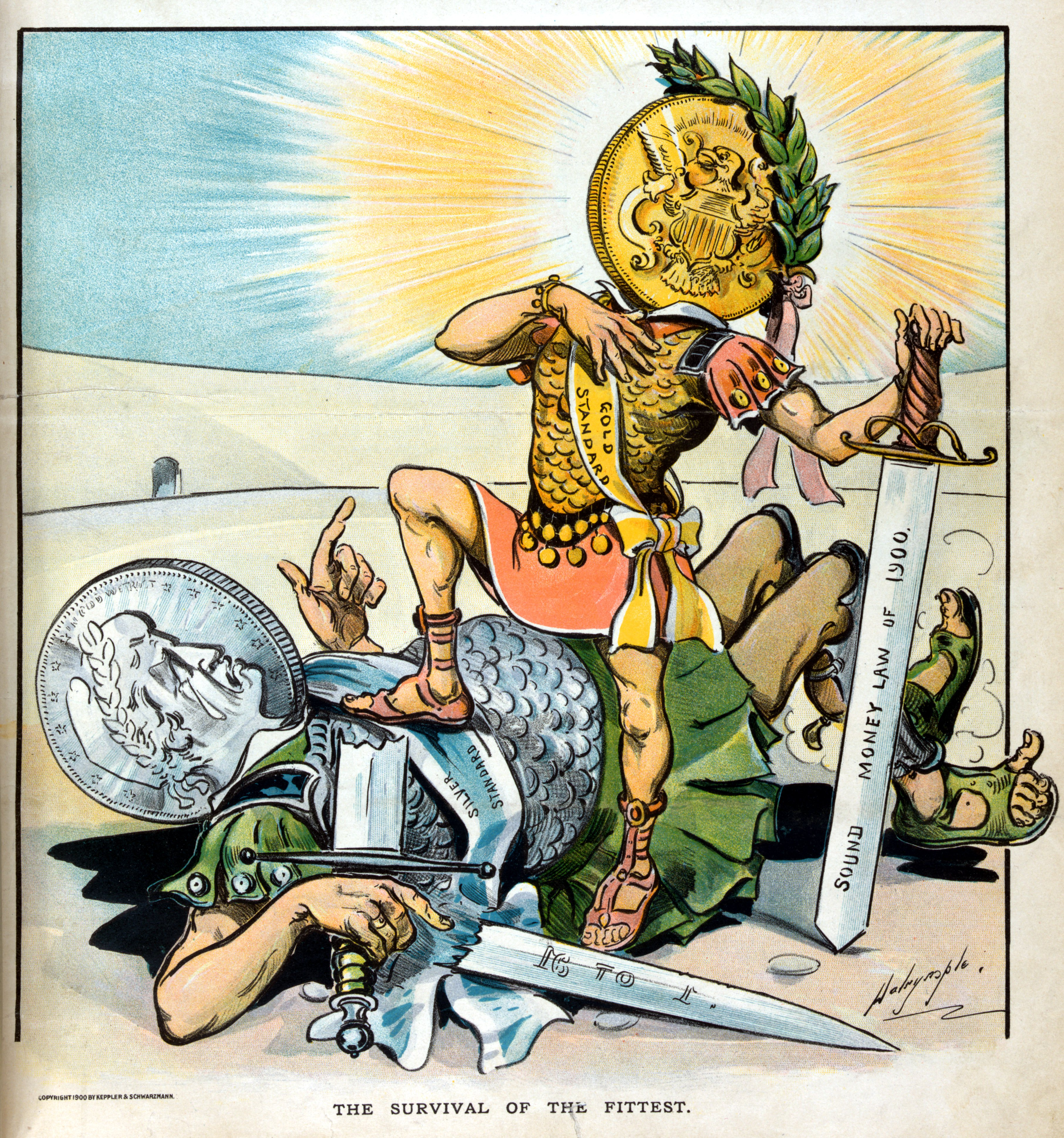
The gold standard triumphant, Puck magazine

The economic issues, on which the Fusion coalition built its alliance, included:

1. Free coinage: Currency reform was an emotional issue, and the Fusionists built a pragmatic political coalition around it. The U.S. Coinage Act of 1834 had increased the silver-to-gold weight ratio from its 1792 level of 15:1 to 16:1, which brought the minting price for silver below its international market price, a move favorable to holders of silver bullion. In 1873, due to a change in market dynamics and currency circulation, the Treasury revised the law, abolishing the right of holders of silver bullion to have their metal struck into fully legal tender dollar coins, ending bimetallism in the United States and placing the nation firmly on the gold standard. Because of this, the act became contentious in later years, and it was denounced by people who wanted inflation as the "Crime of '73". The appearance of the revision was that it hurt poor people, as silver was known as "the poor man's money" given its use and circulation among the poor. While state Populist leadership believed its party was more ideologically aligned with the Democrats, some Populists refused to align with a party that did not support increased coinage of silver.
2. 1868 North Carolina railroad bonds scandal: Since before the American Civil War, the state had been trying to expand the Western North Carolina Railroad, which was incorporated in 1855. The railroad, which was supposed to link Asheville to both Paint Rock, Alabama, and Ducktown, Tennessee, saw its construction stalled at Henry Station, a few miles from Old Fort, around 1872, plagued with construction problems in the Blue Ridge Mountains. The railroad became insolvent due to underfunding, misappropriation of bonds, and poor management. The state purchased the railroad in June 1875 for $825,000. However, the purchase also made the state liable for the railroad's debts—a substantial amount of that due to fraud because, in 1868, two men had defrauded the state legislature into issuing bonds for the railroad's western expansion. Controversy mounted when Zebulon Vance was re-elected as Governor in 1877 and made the railroad's completion a personal crusade. Many Democrats blamed Republicans for running up the debt to pay for the railroads.
3. Debt relief: Whites and blacks had differing experiences with debt after the American Civil War. For whites, before the war, being in debt invoked undertones of personal moral failings. However, after the war, the fact that most Southern whites were in debt created a sense of community. That community banded together to push for political and economic reforms and negotiate favorable interest rates. Conversely, black people deemed debt another form of slavery, one that was immoral, and sought to avoid it. They were often subject to high, non-negotiable interest rates. Recognizing that poor whites—who advocated doing away with credit systems altogether, in favor of a "pure-cash" system—had an incentive to keep debt low, and that poor black people were less well off than poor whites, Fusionists sought a platform to align their interests. By 1892, poor whites were incensed at Zebulon Vance and the Democrats, who had pledged to stand with the Farmers' Alliance (a precursor to the Populist party) on the issue of debt but had failed to do anything about the issue. In July 1890, Eugene Beddingfield, an influential member of the North Carolina State Farmers' Alliance, warned Vance about the extent of their anger, saying "The people are very restless. We are on the verge of a revolution. God grant it may be bloodless ... You cannot stand before the tide if it turns in your direction. No living power can withstand it."

With 90 percent of North Carolinians in debt, the Fusionist platform restricted interest rates to 6 percent. In 1895, once in office, the Fusionists successfully passed the measure with about 95 percent of black Republicans and white Populists supporting it; however, 86 percent of Democrats, who accounted for most of the lending class, opposed it.

== 1898 white supremacy campaign ==
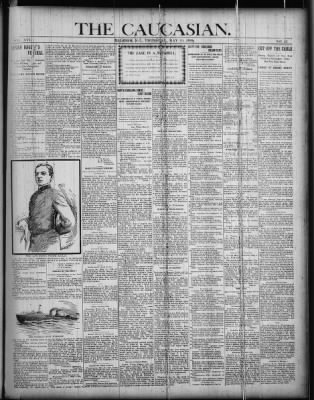
The Caucasian May 19, 1898

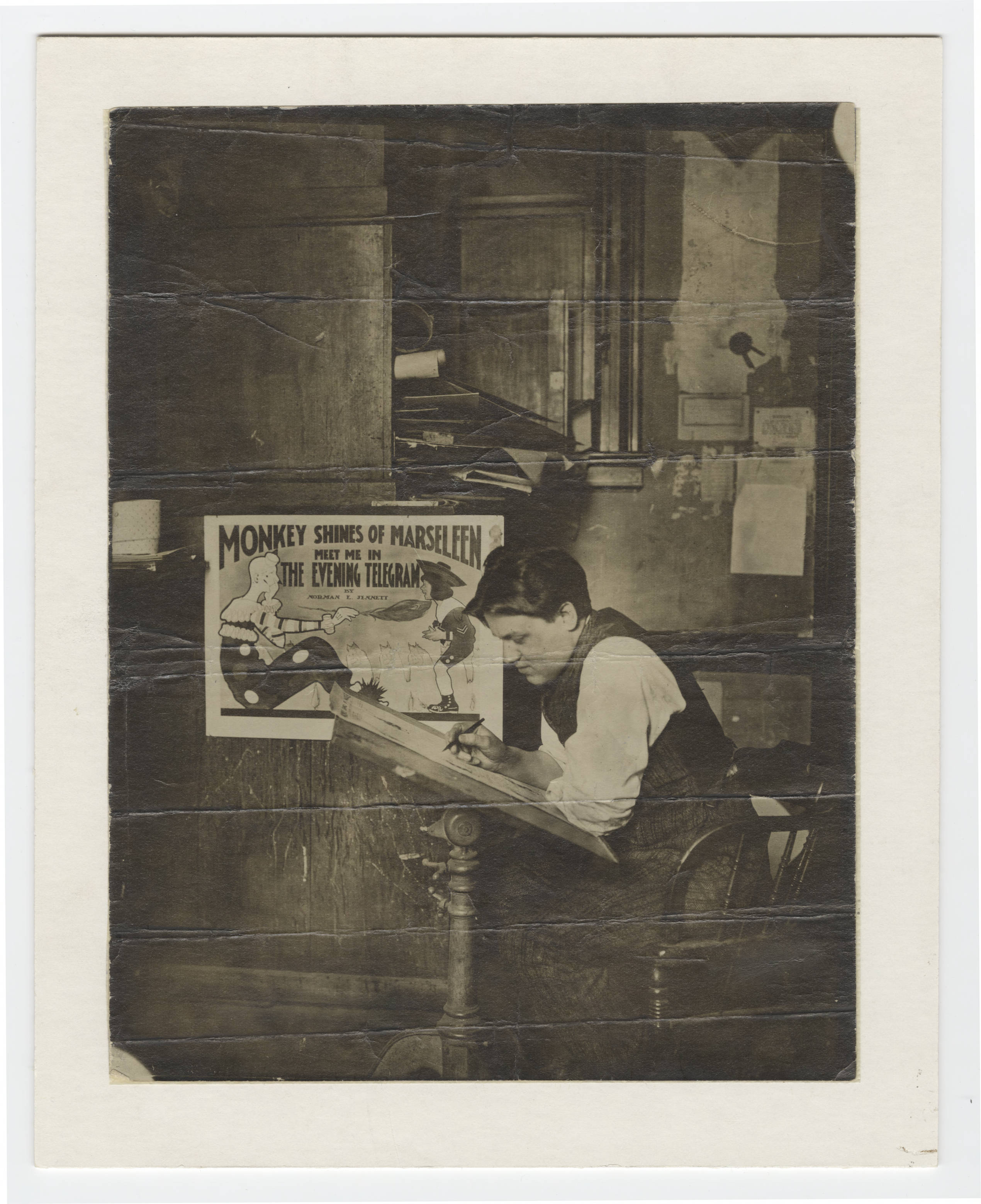
Norman E. Jennett, c. 1900

In late 1897, nine prominent Wilmington men were unhappy with what they called "Negro Rule" in the city hall. As well, they were anxious of black success in the 1898 U.S. Congressional election. An editorial in a black newspaper merely expressing that some white women voluntarily chose sexual relations with black individuals ignited the racist social culture in Wilmington.

White supremacists were aggrieved about Fusion government reforms that affected their ability to manage and "game" (i.e., fix to their advantage) the city's affairs. Interest rates were lowered, which decreased banking revenue. Tax laws were adjusted, directly affecting stockholders and property owners who now had to pay a "like proportion" of taxes on the property they owned. Railroad regulations were tightened, making it more difficult for those who had railroad holdings to capitalize on them. Many Wilmington Democrats thought these reforms were directed at them, the city's economic leaders.

These men, the "Secret Nine" —Hugh MacRae, J. Allan Taylor, Hardy L. Fennell, W. A. Johnson, L. B. Sasser, William Gilchrist, P. B. Manning, E. S. Lathrop, and Walter L. Parsley—banded together and began conspiring to re-take control of the city government.

=== Democrats prepared for the 1898 elections ===
Around the same time, the newly elected Democratic State Party Chairman, Furnifold Simmons, was tasked with developing a strategy for the Democrats' 1898 campaign. Both the North Carolina U.S. House of Representatives seat and seats in the North Carolina Senate were to be up for grabs. Wilmington and the adjacent New Hanover County were important in these fights.

Simmons believed that in order to win, he needed an issue that would cut across party lines, moving votes from the Republican and Populist parties to Democratic Party candidates. A student of Southern political history, he knew that racial resentment was easy to inflame. He later admitted he had remembered what Populist Senator Marion Butler had written the previous year in his newspaper, The Caucasian: "There is but one chance and but one hope for the railroads to capture the net [sic] legislature, and that is for the nigger to be made the issue."

Simmons then decided to build a campaign around the issue of white supremacy, knowing that the question would overwhelm all other issues. He began working with the Secret Nine, who volunteered to use their connections and funds to advance his efforts. He developed a strategy to recruit men who could "Write, Speak, and Ride". "Writers" were those who could create propaganda in the media; "speakers" were those who would be powerful orators; and "riders" were those who could ride a horse and be intimidating.

In March 1898, after realizing that the Raleigh-based News & Observer and The Charlotte Observer, which represented both the liberal and conservative wings in the Democratic party, were "together in the same bed shouting 'nigger'", Simmons met with Josephus "Jody" Daniels, the editor of the News & Observer, who also had the 21-year-old cartoonist Norman Jennett (nicknamed "Sampson Huckleberry") on staff, and with Charles Aycock.

Simmons began by recruiting media outlets sympathetic to white supremacy, such as The Caucasian and The Progressive Farmer, which cynically called the Populists the "white man's party", while touting the party's alliance with black people. He also recruited aggressive, dynamic, and militant young white supremacists to help his effort. These publications presented black people as being "insolent", accused them of exhibiting ill-will and disrespect for whites in public, labeled them as corrupt and unjust, constantly laid claims about black men's alleged interest in white women, and accused white Fusionists allied with them of supporting "negro domination".

Simmons summarized the party's platform when he stated "North Carolina is a WHITE MAN'S STATE and WHITE MEN will rule it, and they will crush the party of Negro domination beneath a majority so overwhelming that no other party will ever dare to attempt to establish negro rule here.

Party leader Daniel Schenck added "It will be the meanest, vilest, dirtiest campaign since 1876. The slogan of the Democratic party from the mountains to the sea will be but one word ... 'Nigger'!

On November 20, 1897, following a Democratic Executive Committee meeting in Raleigh, the first statewide call for white unity was issued. Written by Francis D. Winston, it called on whites to unite and "re-establish Anglo-Saxon rule and honest government in North Carolina". He called Republican and Populist rule anarchy, evil, and apocalyptic, setting a vision for the Democrats to be the saviors—the redeemers—that would rescue the state from "tyranny".

=== Alfred M. Waddell ===
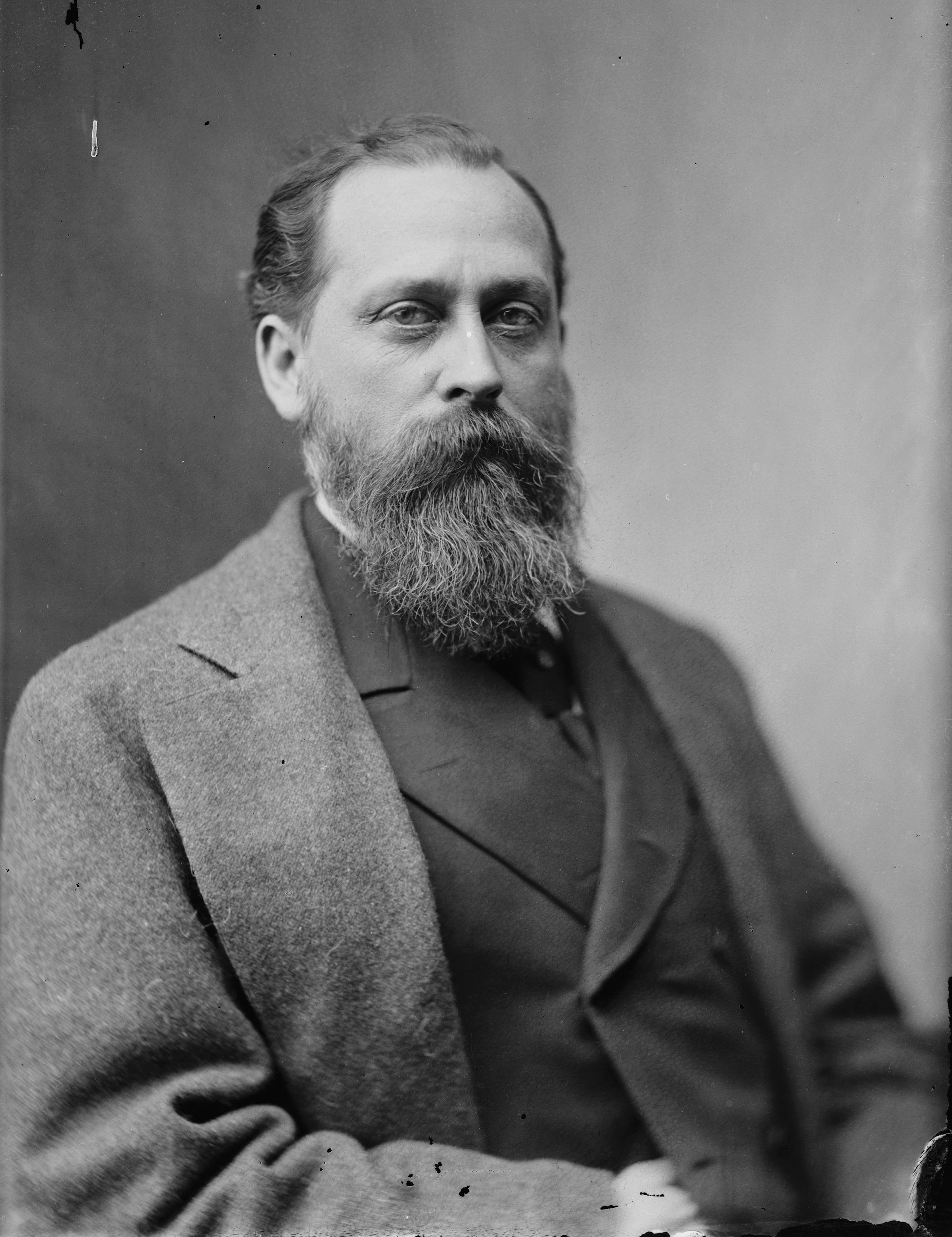
Alfred Moore Waddell

Simmons created a speakers bureau, stacking it with talented orators whom he could deploy to deliver the message across the state. One of those orators was Alfred Moore Waddell, an aging member of Wilmington's upper class who was a skilled speaker and four-time former Congressman, losing his seat to Daniel L. Russell in 1878.

Waddell remained active after his defeat, becoming a highly sought-after political speaker and campaigner. He positioned himself as a representative of oppressed whites and a symbol of redemption for inflamed white voters. He had developed a reputation as "the silver tongued orator of the east" and as an "American Robespierre".

In 1898, Waddell, who was then unemployed, was also dealing with financial difficulty. His law practice was struggling, and his third wife, Gabrielle, largely supported him through her music teaching. The Chief of Police, John Melton, later testified that Waddell was seeking an opportunity to return to prominence as a politician, in order to "lighten the burden of his wife".

Waddell aligned with the Democrats and their campaign to "redeem North Carolina from Negro domination". Melton stated that Waddell, who had been out of public life for while, saw the White Supremacy Campaign as "his opportunity to put himself before the people and pose as a patriot, thereby getting to the feed trough".

Waddell was "hired to attend elections and see that men voted correctly". With the aid of Daniels, who would distribute racist propaganda that he later acknowledged helped fuel a "reign of terror" (i.e., disparaging cartoons of blacks) before speeches, Waddell, and the other orators, began appealing to white men to join their cause.

=== White supremacist clubs ===
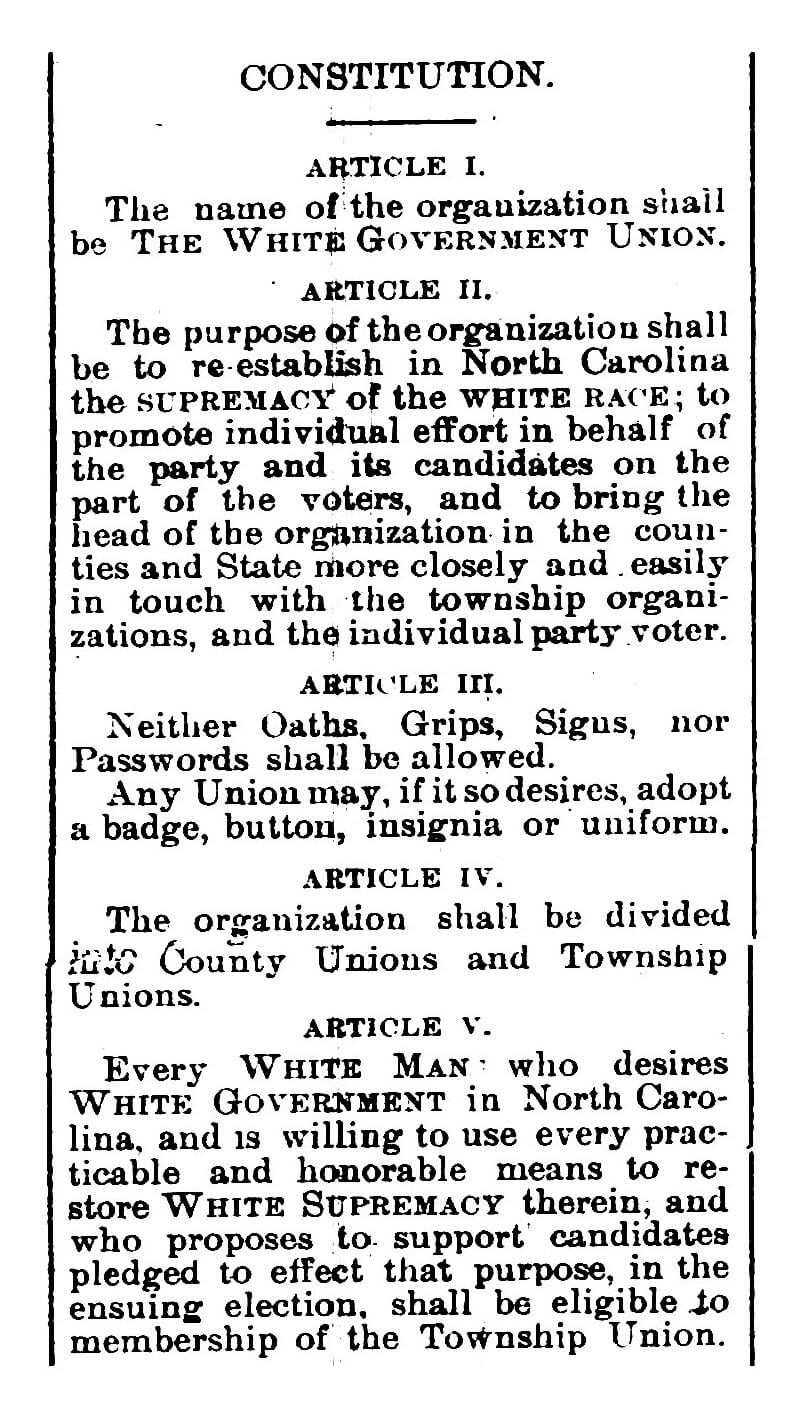
White government union constitution. Wilmington Morning Star. 1898

As the fall of 1898 approached, George Rountree, Francis Winston, and attorneys William B. McCoy, Iredell Meares, John D. Bellamy and other prominent Democrats organized white supremacist clubs, as branches of the White Government Union. The clubs demanded that every white man in Wilmington join them.

Many [of the] good people were marched from their homes ... taken to headquarters, and told to sign. Those that did not were notified that they must leave the city ... as there was plenty of rope in the city.

Membership in the clubs began to spread throughout the state. The clubs were complemented by the development of a white labor movement which was founded for the purpose of opposing blacks who were competing for jobs with whites. The "White Laborer's Union" got the backing of the Wilmington Chamber of Commerce and the Merchant's Association and it vowed to found a "permanent labor bureau for the purpose of procuring white labor for employers".

The efforts of the white supremacists peaked in August 1898. A pro-lynching speech by Rebecca Latimer Felton from 1897 was reprinted in newspapers at various times throughout the South. On August 18, 1898, Alexander Manly, one of the brothers who owned Wilmington's only black newspaper, Daily Record The Daily Record, published an editorial in response to Felton's speech. Manly rebutted the speech by stating that white women were not raped by black men, that some willingly slept with black individuals. Manly was the acknowledged grandson of Governor Charles Manly and his slave, Corinne.

Some whites were outraged by Manly's editorial. The outrage provided an opening for Democrats, who had taken to calling themselves "The White Man's Party". Democrat speakers denounced Manly's editorial by claiming there was "evidence" of the existence of predatory and emboldened blacks.

=== White supremacist commentaries ===
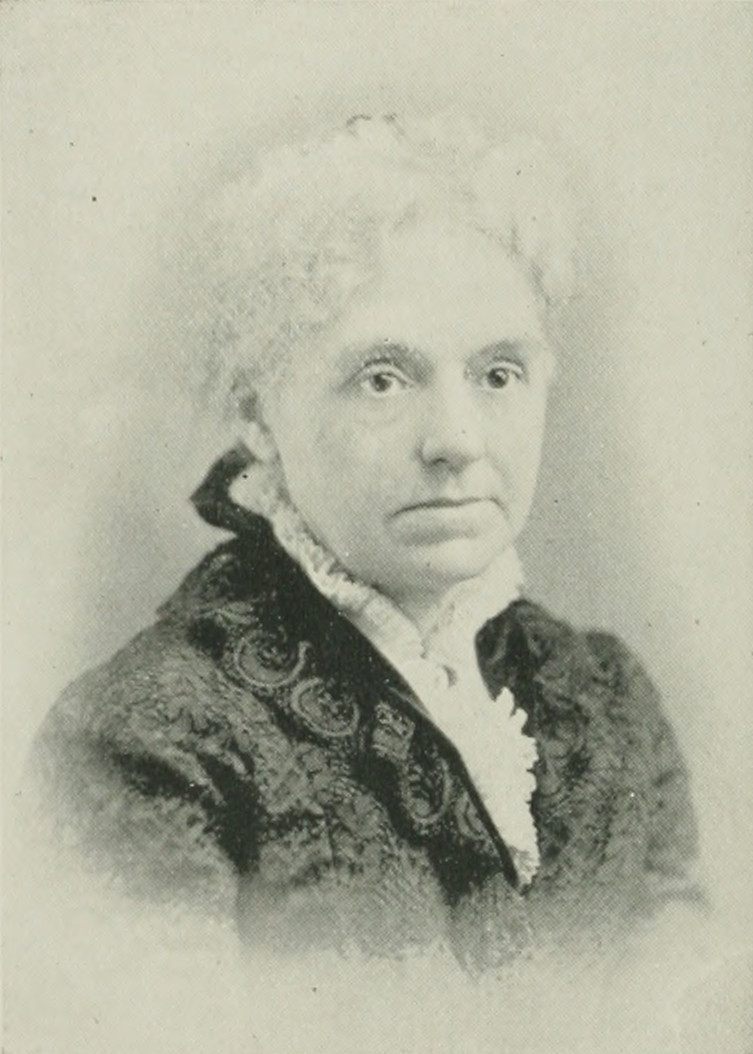
Rebecca L. Felton, who gave an August 11, 1897, speech supporting lynching (image pre-1893)

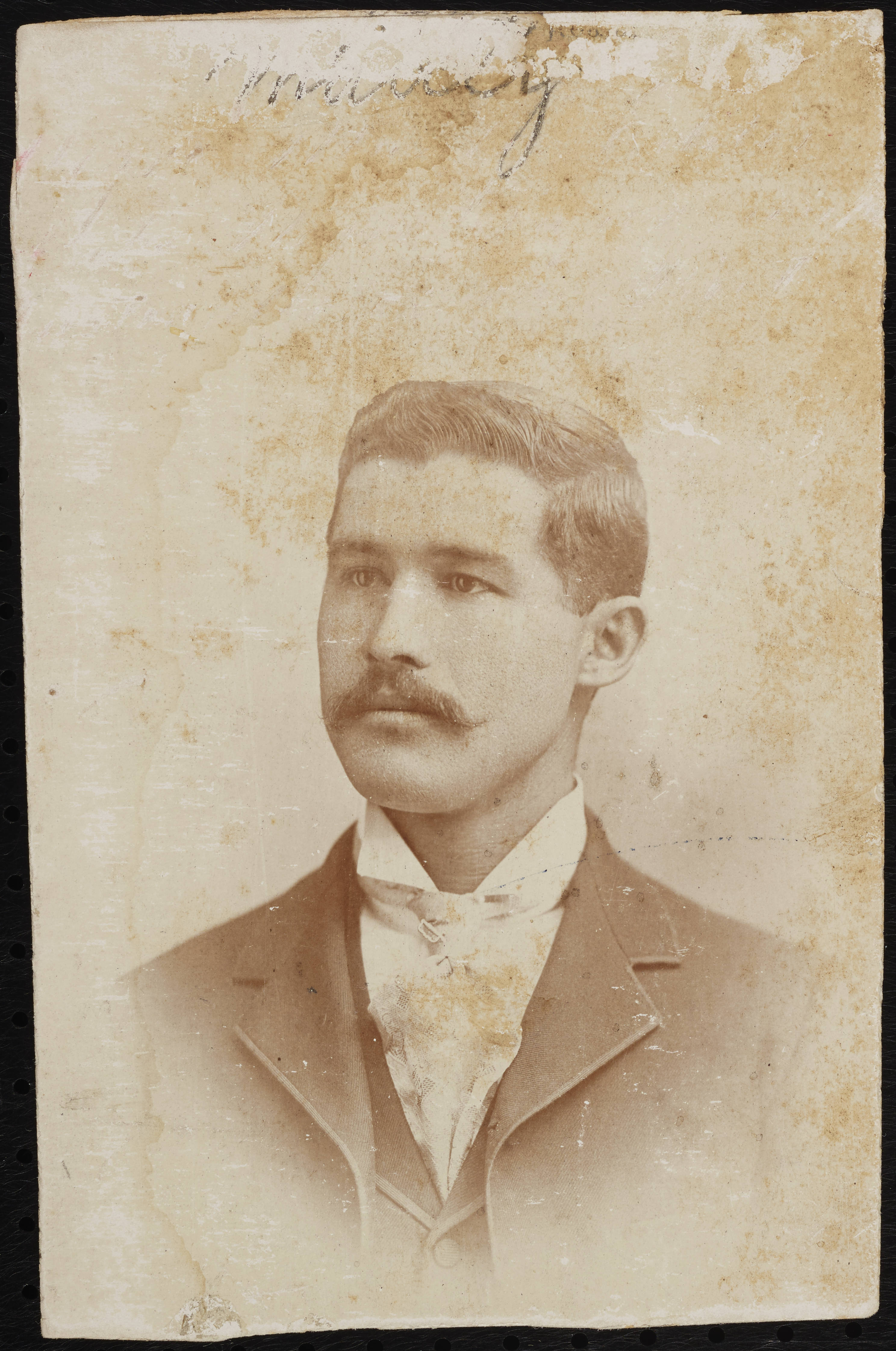
Alexander Manly, who as editor of The Wilmington Daily Record wrote a rebuttal editorial on August 18, 1898 (image c. 1880s)

For some time, Josephus Daniels had used Wilmington as a symbol of "Negro domination" because its government was biracial, ignoring the fact that it was dominated by a two-thirds white majority. Many newspapers published pictures and stories implying that African-American men were sexually attacking white women in the city.

This belief was championed throughout the country following that speech by Felton, who was well-known as a women's suffragist, and was also the wife of Georgia populist William H. Felton, at the Georgia Agricultural Society. She had claimed that of all the threats farm wives face, none was greater than "the black rapist" due to the failure of white men to protect them, and said that, in order to restore that protection, white men should resort to vigilante "justice".

When there is not enough religion in the pulpit to organize a crusade against sin; nor justice in the court house to promptly punish crime; nor manhood enough in the nation to put a sheltering arm about innocence and virtue – if it needs lynching to protect woman's dearest possession from the ravening human beasts – then I say lynch, a thousand times a week if necessary.

— Rebecca Latimer Felton, August 11, 1897

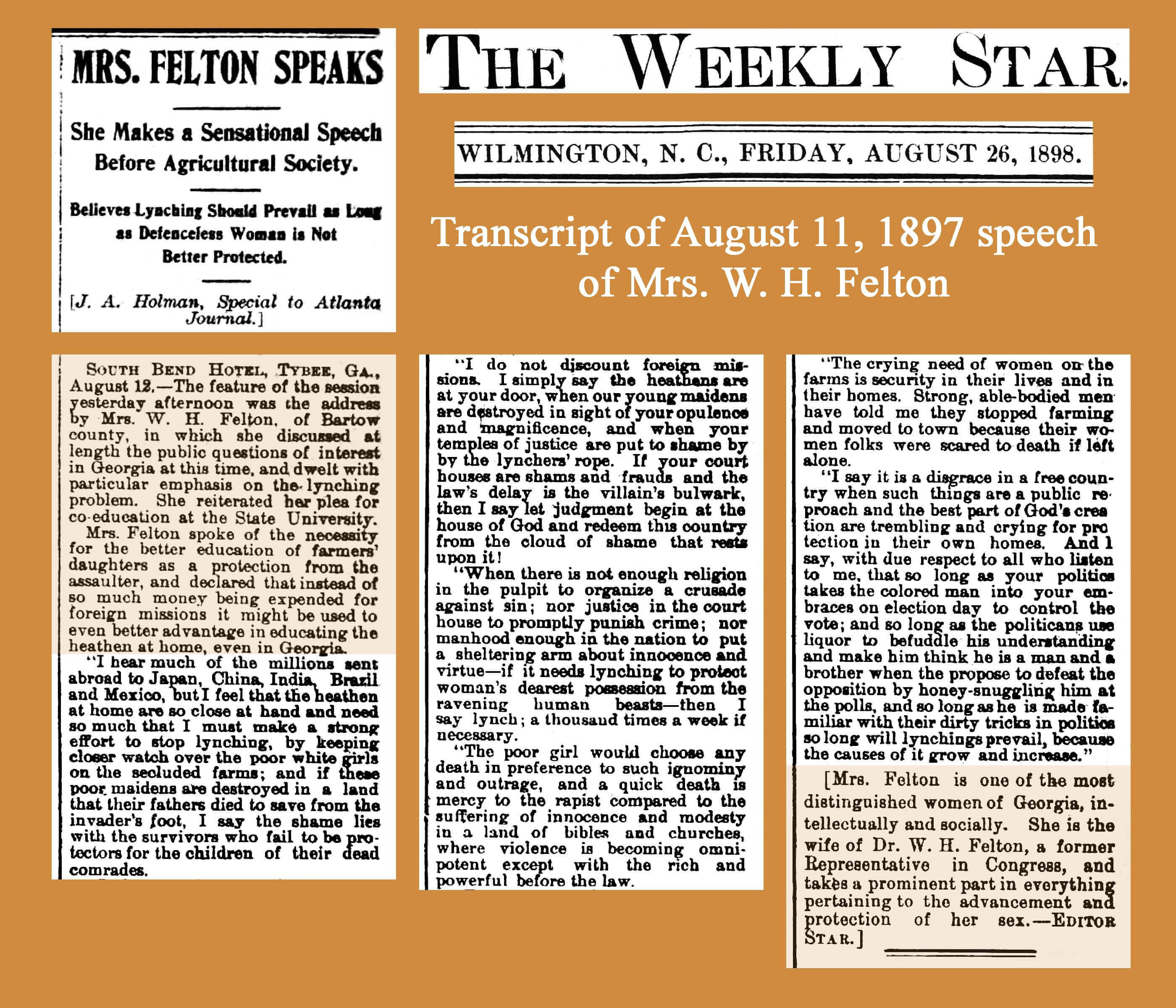
Transcript of Rebecca Latimer Felton's August 11, 1897, speech in Georgia asserting that, given the inability of the church or courts to protect white women from "the ravening human beasts—then I say lynch; a thousand times a week if necessary".

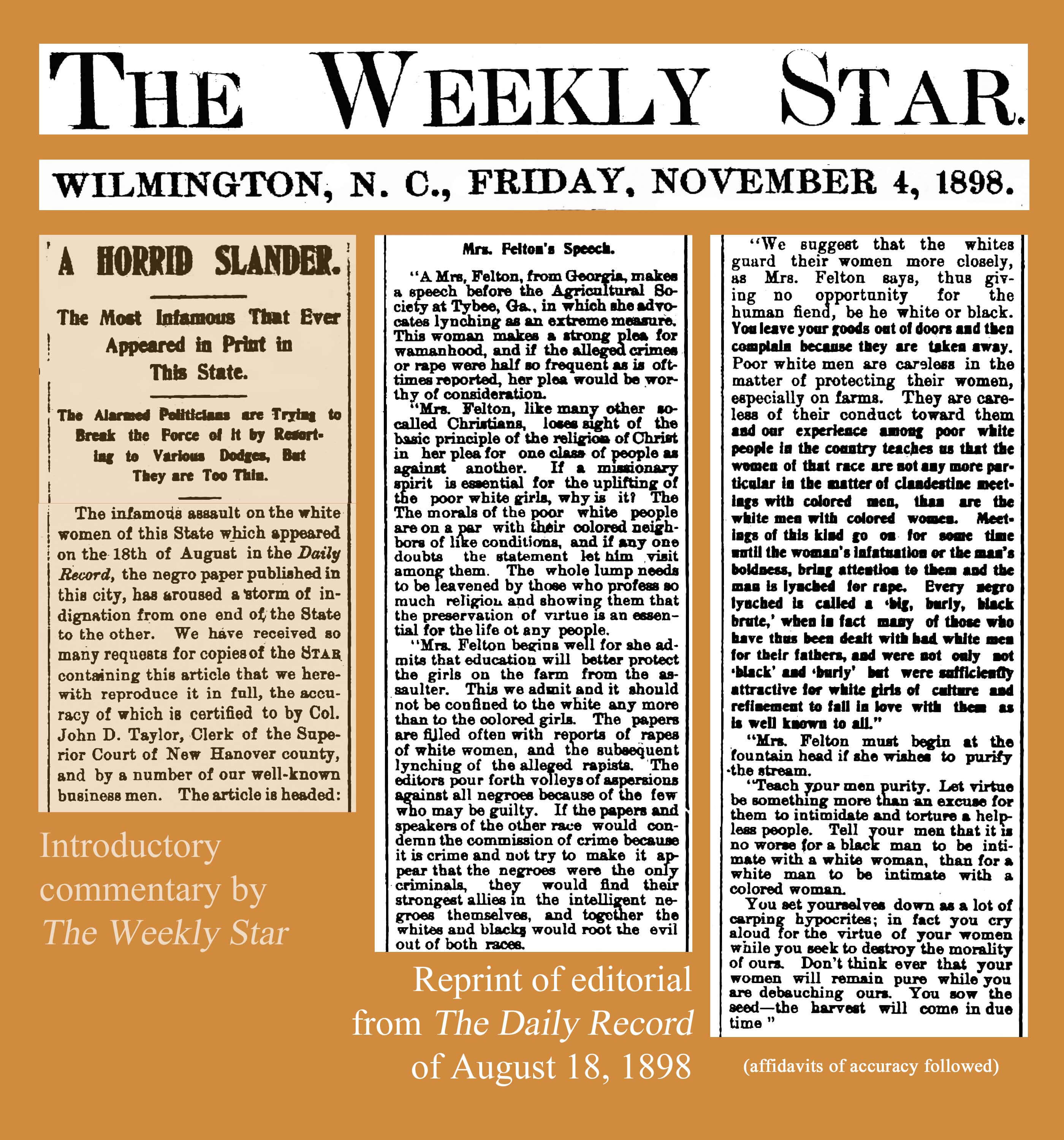
Reprint of Alexander Manly's August 18, 1898 Daily Record rebuttal editorial defending interracial relationships. Manly's editorial was used as a pretext for the insurrection in November.

In response to Felton's speech and the danger it imposed upon black men, 32-year-old Alexander Manly wrote an editorial for the August 18, 1898 edition, refuting Felton's speech and asserting that some white women have consensual sex with black men.

Fearing that the piece would provoke backlash, five prominent black Wilmington Republicans—W. E. Henderson (lawyer), Charles Norwood (Register of Deeds), Elijah Green (Alderman), John E. Taylor (Deputy Collector of Customs) and John C. Dancy (Collector of Customs)— urged Manly to suspend the paper and not publish the editorial.

However, it was published and some whites were appalled at the suggestion of consensual sex between black men and white women. White supremacists, aided by newspapers across the South, then used Manly's words—though reprinting incendiary distortions of them—as a championing catalyst for their cause. Waddell and other orators incited excitement among white citizens by portraying sexualized images of black men, insinuating black men's uncontrollable lust for white women, running newspaper stories and delivering speeches of "black beasts" who threatened to deflower white women.

A few days after the coup, Felton would say of Manly:

When the negro Manly attributed the crime of rape to lewd intimacy between negro men and white women of the south, the slanderer should be made to fear a lyncher's rope rather than occupy a place in newspapers.

— Rebecca Latimer Felton, The Lawrence Gazette

Before this editorial, The Daily Record had been considered "a very creditable colored paper" throughout the state, that had attracted subscriptions and advertising from blacks and whites alike. However, after the editorial, white advertisers withdrew their support from the paper, crippling its income. Manly's landlord, M. J. Heyer, then evicted him. For his own safety, Manly relocated his press in the middle of the night. He and supporters moved his entire press from an office at the corner of Water Street and Princess Street to a frame building on Seventh Street between Ann and Nun. He had planned to move to Love and Charity Hall (aka Ruth Hall), on South Seventh Street, but it declined to take him as a tenant because his presence would have greatly increased the building's insurance rate. Black pastors asked their congregations to step in and purchase subscriptions to help keep Manly's newspaper solvent, which many black women agreed to do, as they deemed Manly's paper to be the "one medium that has stood up for our rights when others have forsaken us".

John C. Dancy later called Manly's editorial "the determining factor" of the coup, while Star-News reporter, Harry Hayden, referred to it as "the straw that broke Mister Nigger's political back" due to the backlash that it unleashed.

=== Laying the base for the 1898 Congress election and coup ===
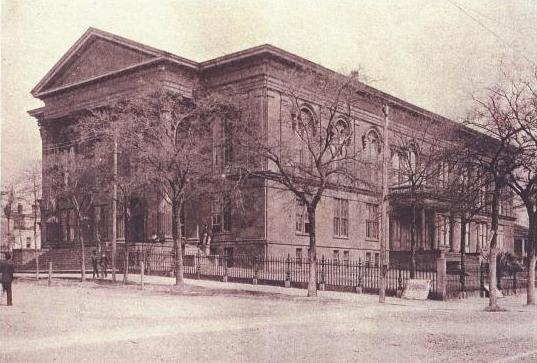
Thalian Hall, c. 1898

On October 21, 1898, in Fayetteville, the Democrats staged their largest political rally. The Red Shirts made their North Carolina debut, with 300 of them accompanying 22 young white ladies in a parade where cannons were fired and a brass band played. A guest of honor was South Carolina senator, Ben Tillman, who chastised the white men of North Carolina for not yet "killing that damn nigger editor [Manly]", bragging that Manly would be dead if his editorial had been published in South Carolina, and when it came to blacks, advocating a "shotgun policy".

Four days later, 50 of Wilmington's most prominent white men, such as Robert Glenn, Thomas Jarvis, Cameron Morrison and Charles Aycock, who was now the pre-eminent orator of the campaign, packed the Thalian Hall opera house. Alfred Moore Waddell delivered a speech, declaring that white supremacy was the only issue of importance for white men. He deemed blacks to be "ignorant" and railed that "the greatest crime that has ever been perpetrated against modern civilization was the investment of the negro with the right of suffrage", and he advocated punishment for race-traitors for enabling it, cementing his call with a blistering closing:

We will never surrender to a ragged raffle of Negroes, even if we have to choke the Cape Fear River with carcasses.

Waddell's closing became a rallying cry, for white men and women alike:

This I do not believe for a moment that they will submit any longer it is time for the oft quoted shotgun to play a part, and an active one, in the elections ... We applaud to the echo your determination that our old historic river should be choked with the bodies of our enemies, white and black, but what his state shall be redeemed. It has reached the point where blood letting is needed for the health of the commonwealth and when [it] commences let it be thorough! Solomon says 'there is a time to kill.' That time seems to have come so get to work ... You go forward to your work bloody tho' it may be, with the heart felt approval of many good women in the State. We say AMEN ...

— Rebecca Cameron, October 26, 1898

Portions of Waddell's speech were printed, sent around the state, and "quoted by speakers on every stump".

=== "White Supremacy Convention" ===
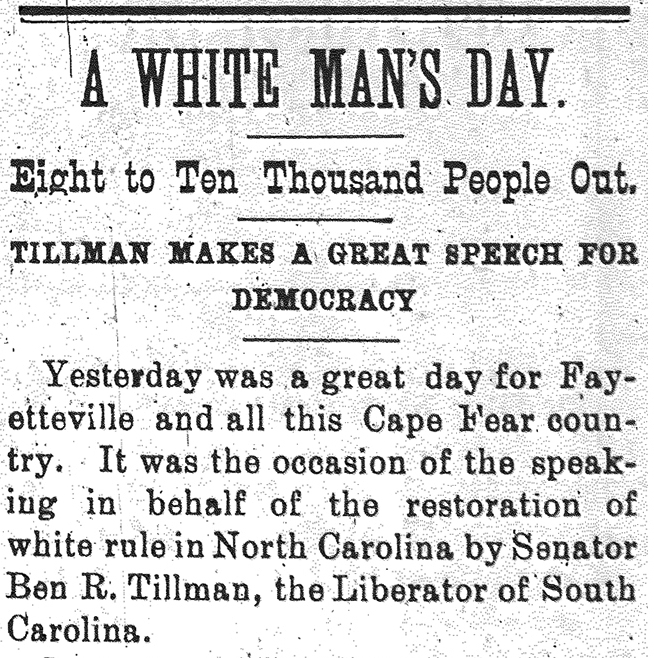
The Fayetteville Observer. October 22, 1898

After the Thalian Hall speech, on October 28, "special trains from Wilmington" provided discounted train tickets to Waddell and other white men who were traveling across the state to Goldsboro in order to attend a "White Supremacy Convention". A crowd of 8,000 showed up to hear Waddell share the stage with Simmons, Charles Aycock, Thomas Jarvis, and Major William A. Guthrie and the mayor of Durham. Preceding Waddell on the stage, Guthrie declared:

The Anglo Saxon planted civilization on this continent and wherever this race has been in conflict with another race, it has asserted its supremacy and either conquered or exterminated the foe. This great race has carried the Bible in one hand and the sword [in the other]. Resist our march of progress and civilization and we will wipe you off the face of the earth.

Waddell followed by accusing blacks of "insolence", "arrogance", which he claimed was overshadowed only by their "criminality". He insinuated that black men were disrespectful to white women, and blamed the "evils of negro rule" on the white men who had empowered them by "betraying their race". Once again, he concluded his speech assuring them that white men would banish blacks, and their traitorous white allies, even if they had to fill the Cape Fear River with enough black dead bodies to block its passage to the sea.

=== Intimidation ===
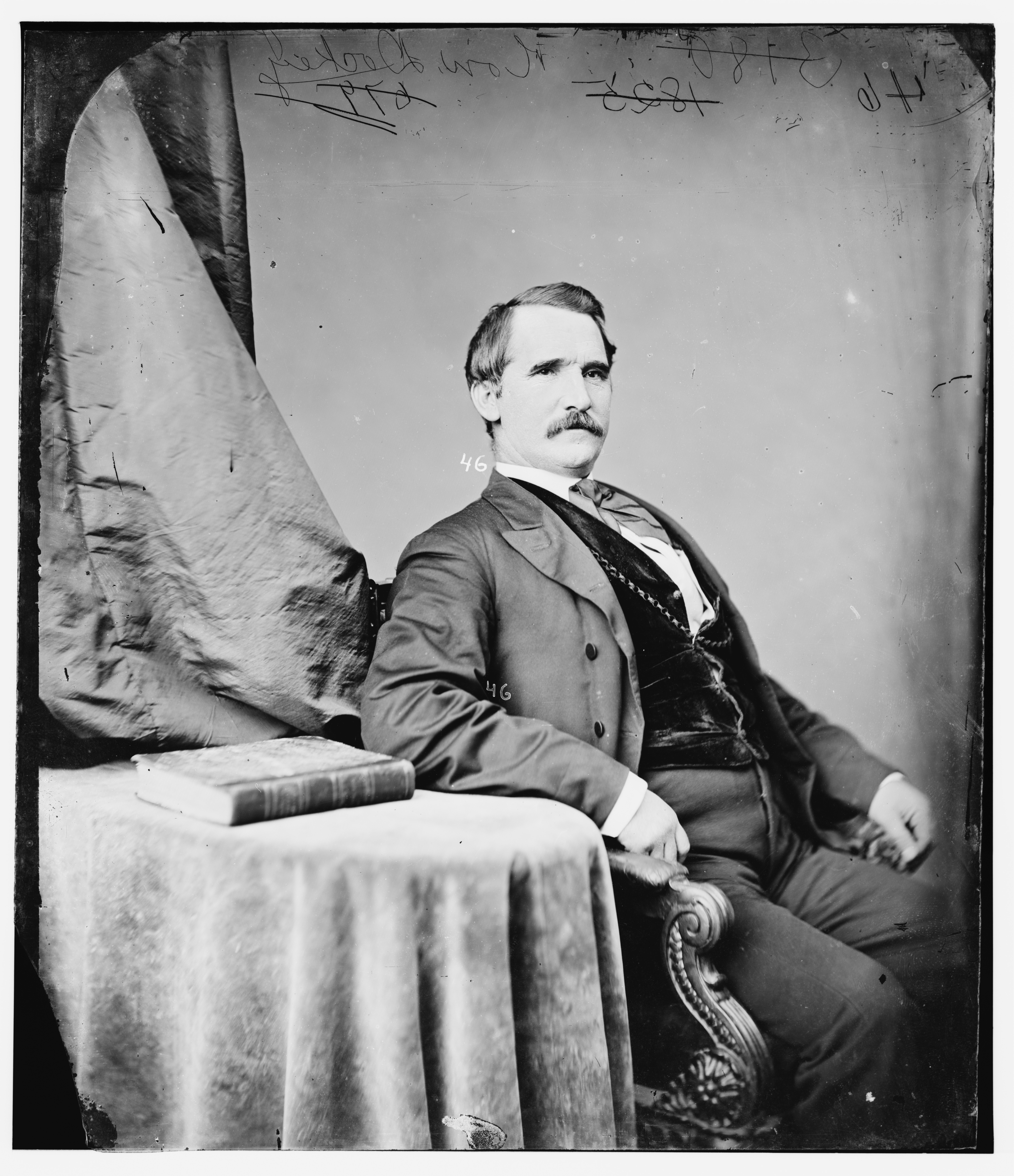
Oliver H. Dockery

Waddell's speech so inspired the crowd that the Red Shirts left the convention and engaged in terrorist attacks on black citizens and white allies, in the eastern part of the state, right away. They destroyed property, ambushed citizens with weapon fire, and kidnapped people from their homes and whipped them at night, with the goal of terrorizing them to the point where Republican sympathizers would be too afraid to vote, or even register to do so.

The Populists accused the Democrats of crying "nigger" to distract from the issues, and of attacking the character of good men in order to get elected to office. Several Populists began trying to fight back in the court of public opinion, like Oliver Dockery, who was attacked by John Bellamy at the white supremacy convention:

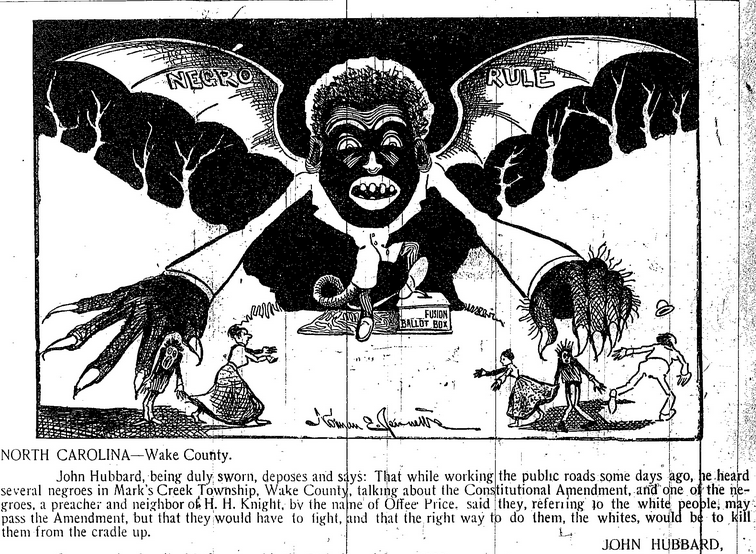
"Negro Rule: Vampire over N.C." The News & Observer. Illustration by Norman Jennett. September 27, 1898.

Wherein is negro domination responsible for the Democratic judges who have sat on the bench in recent years in a state of beastly intoxication and sentenced innocent men to the penitentiary and allowed rogues and murders to go free? Wherein was negro domination responsible for the lease to the Southern Railway of the North Carolina property which has been denounced as a midnight crime? Wherein is negro domination responsible for the existence of one of [the] greatest trusts of the century which has impoverished the entire state? ... Who [has] been responsible for the shameless record of theft and plunder at the state's capital when the legislature was solidly Democratic? It was because of the infamous proceedings of Democratic misrule and pillage that the Populist party was born. ... [the Democrats must] do something else besides cry "negro domination.

— Oliver Dockery, September 9, 1898

However, the Democrats continued to put pressure on Republican and Populist candidates, who were afraid to speak in Wilmington.

Democrats sought to capitalize on this fear by trying to suppress the Republican ticket in New Hanover County, making threats that a win by any political party opposing the Democrats would guarantee a race riot. They told the business community of this outcome "[the election] threatens to provoke a war between the black and white races ... [that] will precipitate a conflict which may cost hundreds, and perhaps thousands, of lives, and the partial or entire destruction of the city. We declare to you our conviction that we are on the brink of a revolution which can only be averted by the suppression of a Republican ticket. - James Menzies Sprunt to Governor Daniel Russell, October 24, 1898

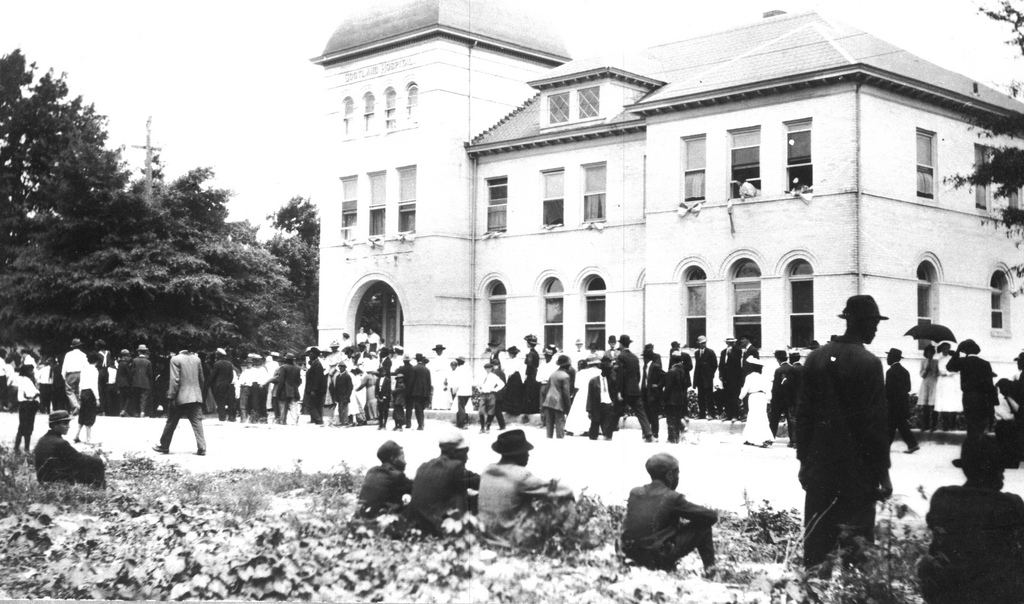
End of Red Shirts' "White Man's Rally". November 2, 1898.

The Wilmington white elite looked down on the Red Shirts, known to be "hot-headed", describing them as "ruffians" and "low class". However, they deployed the Red Shirts around the city. The Red Shirts held a series of marches and rallies. They were led by an unemployed Irishman, Mike Dowling, who, despite being the elected chair of the White Laborer's Union, had recently been fired as the foreman of Fire Engine Company Number 2 for "incompetency, drunkenness, and continued insubordination".

On November 1, 1898, Dowling led a parade of 1,000 men, mounted on horses, on a 10-mile-long trek through Brooklyn and other black neighbourhoods of Wilmington. Joining his Red Shirts were the New Hanover County Horsemen and former members of the disbanded Rough Riders, led by Theodore Swann. White women waved flags and handkerchiefs as they passed. The procession ended at the First National Bank Building, which was serving as the Democratic Party headquarters, where they were encouraged by Democratic politicians in front of big crowds.

The next day, Dowling led a "White Man's Rally". Every "able-bodied" white man was armed. Escorted by Chief Marshal Roger Moore, a parade of men began downtown, again marched through black neighborhoods – firing into black homes and a black school on Campbell Square – and ended at Hilton Park where 1,000 people greeted them with a picnic and free barbecue. A number of defiant speakers followed. For example, future U.S. Representative Claude Kitchin said "All the soldiers in the United States will not keep white people from enjoying their rights", and "if a negro constable comes to a white man with a warrant in his hand, he should leave with a bullet in his brain".

Leading up to the November 8 elections, these gatherings became daily occurrences; the white newspapers announced the time and place of meetings. Free food and liquor were provided for the vigilantes in order to "fire them up, and make them fiercer and more terrorizing in their conduct". At night, the rallies took on a carnival-like atmosphere. Various groups like the Red Shirts thronged the city streets and the patrons of the white supremacy campaign also supplied the whites with a new US$1,200 (equivalent to $46,440 in 2025) Gatling gun.

=== Atmosphere and suppression of black defense ===
The atmosphere in the city made blacks anxious and tense. Conversely, it made whites hysterical and paranoid.

A number of black men attempted to purchase guns and powder, as was legal, but the gun merchants, who were all white, refused to sell them any. The merchants reported to the clubs on any black person who tried to procure arms. Some blacks tried to circumvent the local merchants by purchasing guns from outside of the state, such as from the Winchester Repeating Arms Company. However, the manufacturer would refer the request back to their North Carolina state branch, which would then call the order in to the local Wilmington branch. Once the state branch learned from the local branch that the purchasers were black, the state branch would refuse to fill the order. Merchants sold no guns to blacks between November 1 and 10, but later testified that they sold over 400 guns to whites over the same period. The only weapons blacks had were a few old army muskets or pistols.

Newspapers incited people into believing that confrontation was inevitable. Rumors began to spread that blacks were purchasing guns and ammunition, readying themselves for a confrontation. Whites began to suspect black leaders were conspiring in churches, making revolutionary speeches and pleading with the community to arm themselves with bullets, or to create torches from kerosene and stolen white cotton bales.

Alderman Benjamin Keith wrote "[Readers were] believing everything that was printed, as well as news that was circulated and peddled on the streets. This frenzied excitement went on until every one but those who were behind the plot, with a few exceptions, were led to believe that the negroes were going to rise up and kill all the whites."

The Political Director at The Washington Post, Henry L. West, went to Wilmington to cover the White Supremacy Campaign. He wrote "In Wilmington, I found a very remarkable condition of affairs. The city might have been preparing for a siege instead of an election ... The whites had determined to regain their supremacy; and the wholesale armament was intended to convey to the blacks an earnest of this decision. There would have been rapid-fire guns and Winchester rifles if every church had held a silent pulpit, and every lodge-room where the Negroes met had been empty. White supremacy, therefore, was the magnet that attracted, the tie that bound, the one overwhelming force that dominated everything.

The Democrats hired two detectives to investigate the rumors, including one black detective. However, the detectives concluded that the black residents "were doing practically nothing". George Rountree would later write that two other black detectives claimed that black women agreed to set fire to their employers homes, and that black men threatened to burn Wilmington down if the white supremacists prevailed in the election. To prevent any black conspiring, the Democrats forbade blacks from congregating anywhere.

Right before the election, the Red Shirts, supported by the White Government Union, were told that they wanted the Democrats to win the election "at all hazards and by any means necessary ... even if they had to shoot every negro in the city". The Red Shirts had so instituted a level of fear among the city's blacks that, approaching the election, they were "in a state of terror amounting almost to distress".

The day before the election, Waddell excited a large crowd at Thalian Hall when he told them:

You are Anglo-Saxons. You are armed and prepared and you will do your duty ... Go to the polls tomorrow, and if you find the negro out voting, tell him to leave the polls and if he refuses, kill him, shoot him down in his tracks. We shall win tomorrow if we have to do it with guns.

== 1898 elections ==
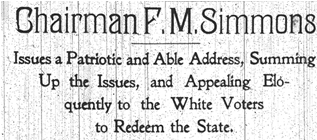
The News and Observer. November 3, 1898.

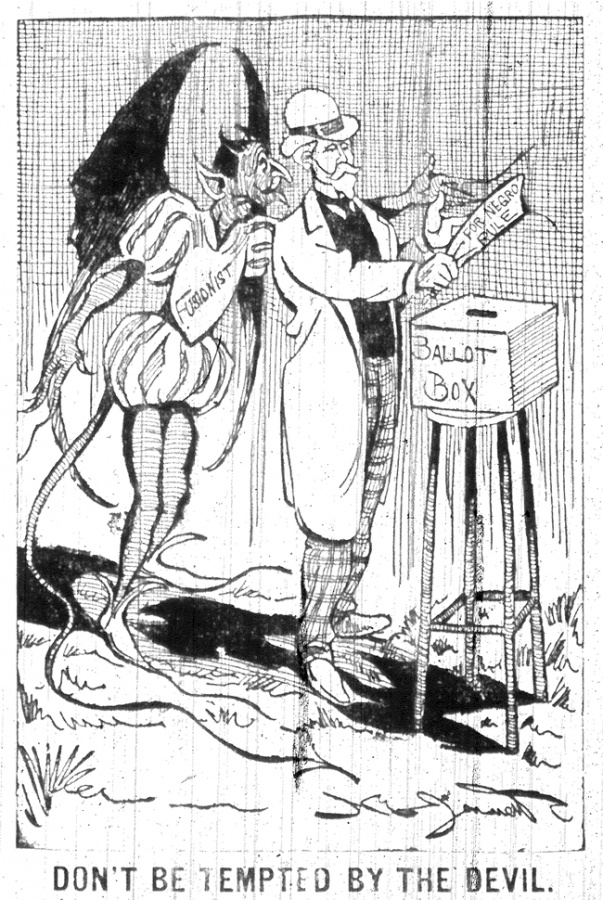
"News and Observer." October 26, 1898. By Norman Jennett.

Most blacks and many Republicans did not vote in the November 8 election, due to the atmosphere of violence. Red Shirts blocked every road leading in and out of Wilmington and even kept black voters from voting with gunfire. The Red Shirts' actions were in line with statements by Congressman W. W. Kitchin, who declared, "Before we allow the Negroes to control this state as they do now, we will kill enough of them that there will not be enough left to bury them."

Governor Russell, who by this point had withdrawn his name from the ballot in the county, decided to go to Wilmington, as it was his hometown, and he hoped to calm the situation. However, when his train arrived, Red Shirts swarmed his train car and tried to lynch him.

The election results have been alleged to be fraudulent. When the votes were counted, Democrats won 6,000 votes, overall, which was surprisingly large given that the Fusion Party won only 5,000 votes just two years prior. The 11,000-vote net increase in vote cast also strongly suggested election fraud, as a later investigation found. Mike Dowling lent credence to this charge when he testified that Democratic party officials worked with the Red Shirts, instructing them where to deposit Republican ballots so they could be replaced by votes for Democrats. The political director of the Washington Post, who was in Wilmington for the election, recounted, "No one for a moment supposes that this was the result of a free and untrammelled ballot; and a Democratic victory here, as in other parts of the State, was largely the result of the suppression of the Negro vote."

George Rountree was elected to the North Carolina State Senate, and John D. Bellamy was elected to the U.S. House of Representatives. Bellamy's election was later unsuccessfully appealed.

The night following the election, Democrats ordered white men to patrol the streets, expecting blacks to retaliate. However, no retaliation occurred:

... [A]ll the abuse which has been vented upon them for months they have gone quietly on and have been almost obsequiously polite as if to ward off the persecution they seemed involuntarily to have felt to be in the air ... in spite of all the goading and persecuting that has been done all summer the negroes have done nothing that could call vengeance on their heads ... "I awoke that [next] morning with thankful heart that the election has passed without the shedding of the blood of either the innocent or the guilty. I heard the colored people going by to their work talking cheerfully together as had not been the case for many days now.

— Jane M. Cronly, Wilmington Resident, 1898

[I]t was perfect farce ... to be out there in the damp and cold, watching for poor cowed disarmed negroes frightened to death by the threats that had been made against them and too glad to huddle in their homes and keep quiet.

— Michael Cronly, Wilmington Resident, 1898

The biracial Fusionist government still remained in power in Wilmington city hall, because the mayor and board of aldermen had not been up for election in 1898. And white supremacists then turned their attention to this sign of racial equality. The Wilmington city elections were scheduled to be held in March 1899, but the Democrats were unwilling to wait just 4 months to take control of the city government. A city-level coup d'état and accompanying massacre of perhaps 50 blacks was to be the result.

=== The White Declaration of Independence ===
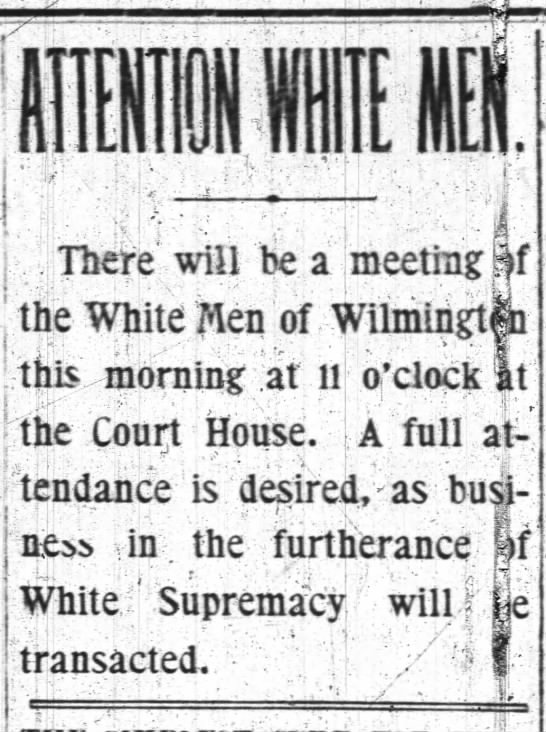
Announcement in the Wilmington Messenger on November 9, 1898

The "Secret Nine" had charged Alfred Moore Waddell's "Committee of Twenty-Five" with "directing the execution of the provisions of the resolutions" within a document that they authored, that called for the removal of voting rights for blacks and for the overthrow of the newly elected interracial government. The document was called "The White Declaration of Independence".

According to the Wilmington Messenger, the Committee of Twenty-Five included Hugh MacRae, James Ellis, Reverend J.W. Kramer, Frank Maunder, F.P. Skinner, C.L. Spencer, J. Allen Taylor, E.S. Lathrop, F. H. Fechtig, W.H. Northon Sr., A.B. Skelding, F.A. Montgomery, B.F. King, Reverend J.W.S. Harvey, Joseph R. Davis, Dr. W.C. Galloway, Joseph D. Smith, John E. Crow, F.H. Stedman, Gabe Holmes, Junius Davis, Iredell Meares, P.L. Bridgers, W.F. Robertson, and C.W. Worth.

On election day, Hugh MacRae (of the Secret Nine) had the Wilmington Messenger call for a mass meeting. That evening, the paper published "Attention White Men", telling all white men to meet at the courthouse the following morning for "important" business.

On the morning of November 9, the courthouse was packed with 600 men of all professions and economic classes. Hugh MacRae sat in front with the former mayor, S.H. Fishblate, and other prominent white Democrats. When Alfred Waddell arrived, MacRae provided him a copy of "The White Declaration of Independence", which Waddell read to the crowd, "asserting the supremacy of the white man". He proclaimed that the U.S. Constitution "did not anticipate the enfranchisement of an ignorant population of African origin", that "never again will white men of New Hanover County permit black political participation", that "the Negro [should] stop antagonizing our interests in every way, especially by his ballot", and that the city should "give to white men a large part of the employment heretofore given to Negroes". The full text of the Declaration is as follows:

Believing that the Constitution of the United States contemplated a government to be carried on by an enlightened people; believing that its framers did not anticipate the enfranchisement of an ignorant population of African origin, and believing that those men of the state of North Carolina, who joined in framing the union did not contemplate for their descendants subjection to an inferior race.

We the undersigned citizens of the city of Wilmington and county of New Hanover, do hereby declare that we will no longer be ruled and will never again be ruled, by men of African origin.

This condition we have in part endured because we felt that the consequences of the war of secession were such as to deprive us of the fair consideration of many of our countrymen.

While we recognize the authority of the United States and will yield to it if exerted, we would not for a moment believe that it is the purpose of 60 million of our own race to subject us permanently to a fate to which no Anglo-Saxon has ever been forced to submit.

We, therefore, believing that we represent unequivocally the sentiments of the white people of this county and city, hereby for ourselves, and as representatives of them, proclaim:

1. That the time has come for the intelligent citizens of this community owning 95 percent of the property and paying taxes in proportion, to end the rule by Negroes.
2. That we will not tolerate the action of unscrupulous white men in affiliating with the Negroes so that by means of their vote they can dominate the intelligent and thrifty element in the community, thus causing business to stagnate and progress to be out of the question.
3. That the Negro has demonstrated by antagonizing our interests in every way, and especially by his ballot, that he is incapable of realizing that his interests are and should be identical with those of the community.
4. That the progressive element in any community is the white population and that the giving of nearly all the employment to Negro laborers has been against the best interests of this county and city, and is sufficient reason why the city of Wilmington, with its natural advantages, has not become a city of at least 50,000 inhabitants.
5. That we propose in the future to give to white men a large part of the employment heretofore given to Negroes because we realize that white families cannot thrive here unless there are more opportunities for employment of the different members of their families.
6. That we white men expect to live in this community peaceably; to have and provide absolute protection for our families, who shall be safe from insult or injury from all persons, whomsoever. We are prepared to treat the Negroes with justice in all matters which do not involve sacrifice of the intelligent and progressive portion of the community. But are equally prepared now and immediately to enforce what we know to be our rights.
7. That we have been, in our desire for harmony and peace, blinded both to our interests and our rights. A climax was reached when the Negro paper of this city published an article so vile and slanderous that it would in most communities have resulted in a lynching [referring to Alexander Manly's editorial in The Wilmington Daily Report], and yet there is no punishment, provided by the courts, adequate for the offense. We, therefore, owe it to the people of this community and city, as protection against such license in the future, that "The Record" cease to be published and that its editor [i.e., Manly] be banished from this community.
8. We demand that he leave the city forever within 24 hours after the issuance of this Proclamation. Second, that the printing press from which "The Record" has been issued be shipped from the city without delay; that we be notified within 12 hours of the acceptance or rejection of this demand.

If the demand is agreed to, we counsel forbearance on the part of the white men. If the demand is refused or no answer is given within the time mentioned, then the editor, Manly, will be expelled by force.

The crowd gave Waddell a standing ovation, and 457 signed their names to adopt the proclamation, which would be published in newspapers, without concealing who they were.

The group then decided to give the city's black residents 12 hours to comply with it. Alexander Manly had been alerted, by a white friend, that the Red Shirts were going to lynch him that night so had already shut his press down and had left town. Manly's friend gave him $25 and told him a password to bypass white guards on Fulton Bridge, as bands of Red Shirts were patrolling the banks, trains, and steamboats. Manly, along with his brother Frank and two other fair-skinned black men, Jim Telfain and Owen Bailey, escaped through the woods on horse-drawn buggies. When they approached the guards at the bridge and gave the password, the guards let them pass. The guards, believing the four men to be white, invited them to a "necktie party" that evening for "that scoundrel Manly". The guards loaded their buggies with Winchester rifles in case they spotted Manly on their way out of the city.

Waddell's Committee of Twenty-Five summoned the Committee of Colored Citizens (CCC), a group of 32 prominent black citizens, to the courthouse at 6:00 pm. They told the CCC of their ultimatum, instructing them to direct the rest of the city's black citizens to fall in line. When the black men tried to reason with them and pleaded that they could not control what Manly did, or what any other black person would do, Waddell responded that the "time had passed for words".

The members of the CCC left the courthouse and went to David Jacob's barbershop on Dock Street, where they wrote a reply to the committee's ultimatum:

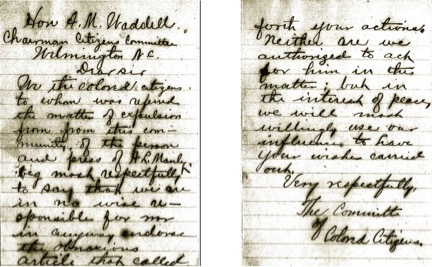
Disputed "Committee of Colored Citizens" letter to Waddell. November 9, 1898.

We, the colored citizens, to whom was referred the matter of expulsion from the community of the person and press of A. L. Manly, beg most respectfully to say that we are in no way responsible for, nor in any way condone, the obnoxious article that called forth your actions. Neither are we authorized to act for him in this manner; but in the interest of peace we will most willingly use our influence to have your wishes carried out.

Lawyer Armond Scott wrote the letter and was instructed by the committee to personally deliver the response to Waddell's home, at Fifth and Princess Streets, by 7:30 a.m. the next day, November 10. Scott left the response in Waddell's mailbox. Scott later claimed that the letter Waddell published in newspapers was not the letter he wrote. He said that the letter he authored expressed that Manly had ended publication of The Daily Record two weeks before the election, thereby eliminating the "alleged basis of conflict between the races".

== Massacre and coup d'état ==
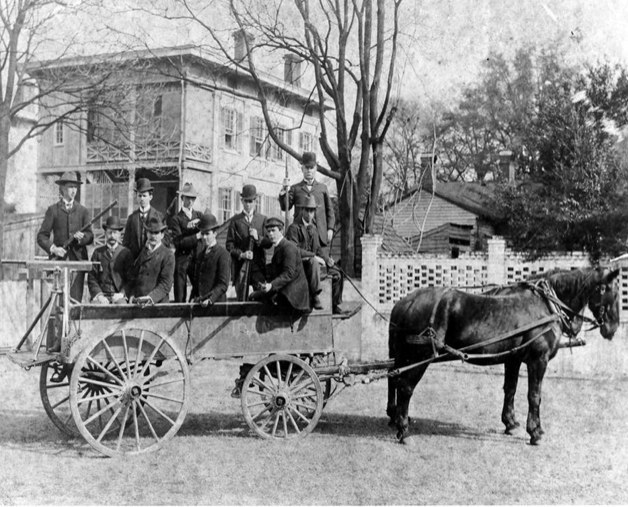
Wilmington Light Infantry

The morning of November 10, Alfred Waddell and the Committee of Twenty Five claimed they had not received a response from the Wilmington Committee of Colored Citizens (CCC) (it is unclear when Waddell checked his mailbox). As a result, around 8:15, Waddell gathered about 500 white businessmen and veterans at Wilmington's armory. After arming themselves with rifles and a Gatling gun, Waddell led the group to the two-story publishing office of The Daily Record. They broke into editor Alexander Manly's building, vandalized the premises, doused the wood floors with kerosene, set the building on fire, and gutted the remains. At the same time, others destroyed other black-owned newspapers all over the state. In addition, blacks, along with white Republicans, were denied entrance to city centers throughout the state.

Following the fire, the mob of white vigilantes swelled to about 2,000 men. A rumor circulated that some black people had fired on a small group of white men a mile away from the printing office. White men then went into black Wilmington neighborhoods, destroying black businesses and property and assaulting black inhabitants with a mentality of killing "every damn nigger in sight".

As Waddell led a group to disband and drive out the elected government of the city, a white mob, armed with shotguns, attacked black people throughout Wilmington, but primarily in Brooklyn, the majority-black neighborhood.

Patrols of armed vigilantes spread out over the city, and shooting continued until nightfall. Governor Russell authorized Walker Taylor to lead Wilmington Light Infantry troops, just returned from the Spanish–American War, and units of the federal Naval Reserves into Brooklyn to quell the "riot". They intimidated both black and whites with rapid-fire weapons, shooting and killing several black men.

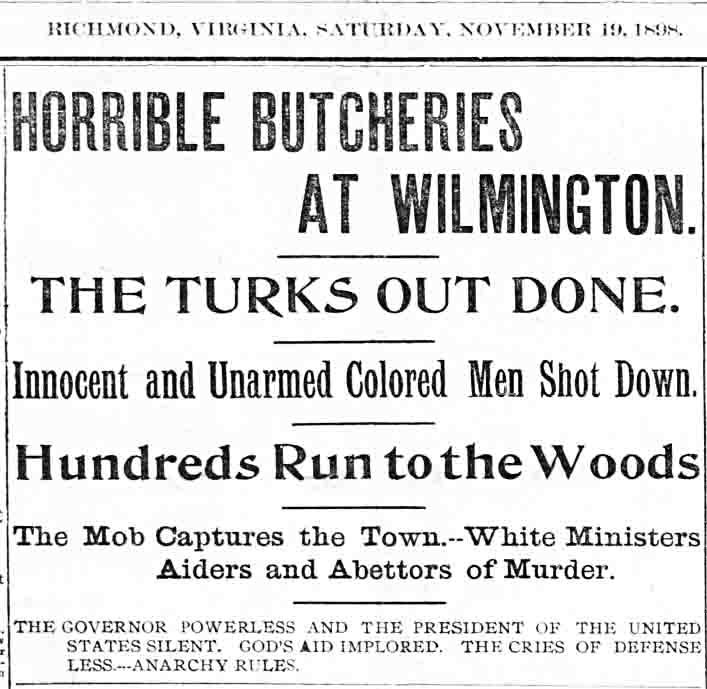
The Richmond Planet's reporting on the massacre. "The Turks out done" refers to the 1890s Hamidian massacres of Armenians in the Ottoman Empire.

Hundreds of black people fled the town to take shelter in nearby swamps.

The number of black people killed by the mob by the end of the day (November 10) is uncertain. Estimates have included "about 20", "more than twenty", "twenty or more", "somewhere between fourteen and sixty", "as many as 60", "at least sixty", "90", "more than one hundred", and "exceeded 300". An additional number, variously estimated between 20 and 50, were banished and ordered to leave town by the mob. The Rev. J. Allen Kirk gave a lengthy statement about the experience, which started "It was a great sight to see them marching from death, and the colored women, colored men, colored children, colored enterprises and colored people all exposed to death. Firing began, and it seemed like a mighty battle in war time. The shrieks and screams of children, of mothers, of wives were heard, such as caused the blood of the most inhuman person to creep. Thousands of women, children and men rushed to the swamps and there lay upon the earth in the cold to freeze and starve. ..." (Note: The woods were filled with colored people. The streets were dotted with their dead bodies. A white gentleman said that he saw ten bodies lying in the undertakers office at one time. Some of their bodies were left lying in the streets until up in the next day following the riot. Some were found by the stench and miasma that came forth from their decaying bodies under their houses. Every colored man who passed through the streets had either to be guarded by one of the crowd or have a paper [pass] giving him the right to pass. All colored men at the cotton press and oil mills were ordered not to leave their labor but stop there, while their wives and children were shrieking and crying in the midst of the flying balls and in sight of the cannons and Gatling gun. All the white people had gone out of that part of the City, this army of men marched through the streets, sword buckled to their sides, giving the command to fire. Men stood at their labor wringing their hands and weeping, but they dare not move to the protection of their homes. And then when they passed through the streets had to hold up their hands and be searched. The little white boys of the city searched them and took from them every means of defence, and if they resisted, they were shot down ... The city was under military rule; no Negro was allowed to come into the city without being examined or without passing through with his boss, for whom he labored. Colored women were examined and their hats taken off and search was made even under their clothing. They went from house to house looking for Negroes that they considered offensive; took arms they had hidden and killed them for the least expression of manhood. They gathered around colored homes, firing like great sportsmen firing at rabbits in an open field and when one would jump his man, from sixty to one hundred shots would be turned loose upon him. His escape was impossible. One fellow was walking along a railroad and they shot him down without any provocation. It is said by an eye witness that men lay upon the street dead and dying, while members of their race walked by helpless and unable to do them any good or their families. Negro stores were closed and the owners thereof driven out of the city and even shipped away at the point of the gun. Some of the churches were searched for ammunition, and cannons turned toward the door in the attitude of blowing up the church if the pastor or officers did not open them that they might go through. - Rev. J. Allen Kirk, 1898)

As the violence continued, Waddell led a group to the Republican mayor, Silas P. Wright. Waddell forced Wright, the board of aldermen, and the police chief to resign at gunpoint. Waddell's group included future U.S. Congressman John D. Bellamy and future NC Assemblyman George Rountree. The mob installed a new city council that elected Waddell to take over as mayor by 4 p.m. that day.

After Waddell was declared mayor, the "Secret Nine" gave Waddell a list of prominent Republicans whom he was to banish from the city. Most of the black people on the list fled the city. But the next morning Waddell, flanked by George L. Morton and the Wilmington Light Infantry, gathered six prominent black people, the last of those whose names were on the list. Waddell's force put them on a train headed north, in a special car with armed guards who were instructed to take them over the state line. Waddell then gathered the whites whose names were on the list and paraded them in front of a large crowd. G.Z. French was dragged on the ground and nearly lynched from a telephone pole, before being allowed to board the train and leave the city.

== Victims ==
One victim was Joshua Halsey. Born in 1852, he had four daughters—Mary, Susan, Satira, and Bessie—with his wife Sallie. He was accosted one block from his home, shot 14 times, and buried in an unmarked grave. He received a headstone and a funeral in 2021.

== Aftermath ==
=== Wilmington ===
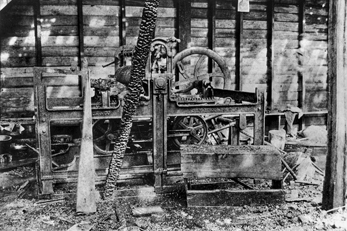
The Daily Record, torched

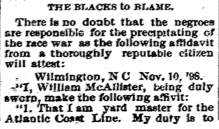
Winston-Salem Journal blames blacks. November 11, 1898.

The coup was deemed a success for the business elite, with The Charlotte Observer quoting a prominent lawyer who said "the business men of the State are largely responsible for the victory..."

Alex and Frank G. Manly, brothers who had owned the Daily Record, fled Wilmington. More than 2,000 blacks left Wilmington permanently, forced to abandon their businesses and properties. This greatly reduced the city's professional and artisan class, and changed the formerly black-majority city into one with a white majority. While some whites were wounded, no whites were reported killed.

Some African Americans sought redress for the attacks at the federal level. City residents' appeals to President William McKinley for help to recover from the widespread destruction in Brooklyn received no response; the White House said it could not respond without a request from the governor, and Governor Russell had not requested any help.

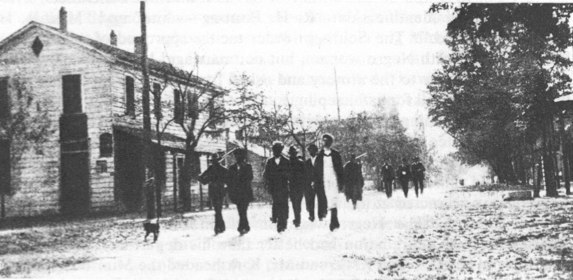
Blacks driven out by the Wilmington Light Infantry

On the other hand, many blamed Manly for provoking the attacks by pushing white supremacists too far. John C. Dancy stated in a November 21 New York Times interview that Manly was responsible for the attacks, and that before his editorials the relations between blacks and whites were "most cordial and amicable ... but the white men of the South will not tolerate any reflection upon their women". Journalist and orator John Edward Bruce agreed, and spoke out against Manly's attempts to "revolutionize the social order". Even the National Afro-American Council called for a day of fasting for African Americans to offer "a hearty confession of our own sins", without condemning the role of white supremacists in the attacks.

In the 6th District, Oliver Dockery contested in court John D. Bellamy's 1898 election to a U.S. congressional seat, on the grounds of fraud and voter intimidation. The appeal was unsuccessful.

The demographic change produced by the exodus of blacks and the political intimidation of Republican and non-Democratic political groups had lasting effects. After 1900, North Carolina did not elect a Republican governor until 1972. No African American was elected to the U.S. Congress from 1898 until 1928. North Carolina did not elect an African American Congress member until 1992.

This exodus and whites' refusal to hire black workers made more jobs available to white men, who were largely disappointed with the work, which they called "nigger jobs" that paid "nigger wages".

After a few months of wielding power as a result of the local coup, Waddell and his team were elected to city council in March 1899. Waddell held the mayorship until 1905. His memoirs were published in 1908 and he died in 1912.

=== Coup leaders ===
| Name | Role | Subsequent life |
|---|---|---|
| Charles Aycock | Organizer | Became the 50th governor of North Carolina. In 1900, he defended the mob violence as being justified to preserve the peace, saying, "This was not an act of rowdy or lawless men. It was the act of merchants, of manufacturers, of railroad men—an act in which every man worthy of the name joined." Gave a famous speech in 1903 about how North Carolina solved "The Negro Problem". Ran for the U.S. Senate in 1912 against Furnifold Simmons, but died before the campaign was decided. A statue in his honor sits at the North Carolina State Capitol, and one sat on Capitol Hill until 2024, when it was replaced by a statue of Billy Graham. |
| John Bellamy | Orator | Became a U.S. Congressman. |
| Josephus Daniels | News & Observer | Appointed Secretary of the Navy by President Woodrow Wilson during World War I. Became close friend of Franklin D. Roosevelt, whom Daniels appointed as Assistant Secretary of the Navy. After Roosevelt became U.S. president, he returned the favor by appointing Daniels as Ambassador to Mexico between 1933 and 1941. In 1985, a statue was erected in his honor in Nash Square. The statue remained until 2020 when it was removed by his family in the wake of the murder of George Floyd. |
| Mike Dowling | Red Shirt | Awarded one of 250 "special" police officer and firefighter positions. Dowling testified in Oliver H. Dockery's lawsuit challenging the validity of John Bellamy's 1898 election, revealing much about the coup's organization. |
| Rebecca Felton | Lynching supporter | Honored with appointment to the United States Senate. Became first woman to serve in the Senate, though she only served for one day. A prominent women's suffragist who championed equal pay for equal work. |
| Robert Broadnax Glenn | Orator | Became a North Carolina State Senator, then Governor of North Carolina and an ordained minister. |
| Tom Jarvis | Orator | Helped found East Carolina University, where the school's oldest residential hall is named in his honor. In Greenville, North Carolina, the United Methodist Church and a street are named in his honor. |
| Norman Jennett | Cartoonist | Thanked by Josephus Daniels for his cartoons for the campaign, with Daniels saying, "I do not know how we could have gotten along in the campaigns of 1896 and 1898 without Jennett's cartoons". Gifted US$63 (equivalent to $2,438 in 2025) by Democrats in appreciation for his "services in assisting in redeeming the state". Went on to work for the New York Herald and The Evening Telegram, and authored a comic strip, "The Monkey Shines of Marseleen". |
| William R. Kenan Sr. | Commander of Wilmington Light Infantry | Father-in-law to Standard Oil founder and Florida founder Henry Flagler; family became extremely wealthy after inheriting much of Flagler's fortune. UNC football stadium was named after William Kenan Sr. until 2018, when it was renamed after his son William R. Kenan Jr. |
| Claude Kitchin | Orator | Longtime U.S. Congressman. Sat on the House Ways and Means Committee and chaired it for four years. Became House Majority Leader. |
| William Walton Kitchin | Leader | Served five more terms in Congress, then elected Governor of North Carolina. Led the 1900 approval of a state constitutional amendment to disenfranchise blacks. Attempted to prove blacks were unworthy of the Fourteenth Amendment. Identified in George Henry White's Congressional farewell address as the politician who had done the most to bring African Americans into "disrepute". |
| Walter Linton Parsley | One of "The Secret Nine" | Donated land to be used as a school, which was named Walter L. Parsley Elementary School, possibly in reference to his grandson, also called Walter L. Parsley. The school's mascot is the Patriots. The name of the school was changed to Masonboro Elementary sometime after a 2020 petition was circulated to request it as a result of the name's legacy. |
| Hugh MacRae | One of "The Secret Nine" | Donated land outside Wilmington to New Hanover County for a "whites only" park, which was named for him. A plaque in his honor stands in the park, though it omits his role in the coup. Hugh MacRae Park, as it was known, had its name changed to Long Leaf Park in 2020. |
| Cameron Morrison | Orator | Became Governor of North Carolina. Was also a U.S. Senator and a U.S. Congressman. |
| George Rountree | WGU sponsor | Elected a North Carolina Assemblyman in 1898 and sponsored legislation to keep blacks disenfranchised with a "grandfather clause". Co-founder of the North Carolina Bar Association. |
| Furnifold Simmons | Campaign manager | Became a U.S. senator and retained his seat for 30 years. Chairman of the Finance Committee for six years and ran, unsuccessfully, for president in 1920. |
| Ben Tillman | Orator | U.S. senator for nearly 25 years. Frequently ridiculed blacks on the floor of the U.S. Senate and boasted of having helped kill them during South Carolina's 1876 gubernatorial campaign. Has a building named in his honor at Clemson University. |
| Alfred Waddell | Orator; coup leader | Entered the 1900 U.S. North Carolina Senate race but withdrew, citing a family illness. Remained Mayor of Wilmington until 1905. Before he died in 1912, he was the keynote speaker at the unveiling of the Confederate monument at the Forsyth County Courthouse, where he was praised as a "gallant" soldier and proclaimed, "I thank God that monuments to the Confederate soldiers are rapidly multiplying in the land. I rejoice in the fact for many reasons, but chiefly because of its significance from one point-of-view". |
| Francis Winston | Campaign manager | Charles Aycock appointed him Judge of the Superior Court for the Second Judicial District. Elected lieutenant governor. Served as United States Attorney for the Eastern District of North Carolina. |

=== State politics ===
Once installed in the state legislature, in 1899, Democrats, who had accounted for nearly 53 percent of the vote, determined there were two things they could do to retain their power:

1. prevent blacks from voting, and
2. normalize a racial hierarchy that allowed poor whites to feel empowered over, and antagonistic toward, blacks.

==== Disenfranchisement ====
To permanently install "good government by the White Man's Party", the "Secret Nine" installed George Rountree in the state legislature to ensure that blacks were kept from voting, and also to keep white Republicans from aligning, politically, with blacks again. On January 6, 1899, Francis Winston introduced a suffrage bill to keep blacks from voting. Rountree went on to chair a special joint committee overseeing the disenfranchisement amendment, a committee that existed to circumvent the U.S. Constitution which, in fact, granted blacks the right to vote.

The legislature passed a law requiring new voters to pay a poll tax, and passed a state constitutional amendment requiring prospective voters to demonstrate, to local elected officials, that they could read and write any section of the Constitution – practices that discriminated against poor whites, and more than 50,000 black men. However, to make sure that as few poor whites as possible would be hurt by the law, and prevented from voting Democrat, Rountree invoked a "Grandfather clause". The clause guaranteed the right to register and vote, bypassing the literacy requirement, if the voter, or a voter's lineal ancestor, was eligible to vote in his state of residence prior to January 1, 1867. This excluded practically any black man from voting. Rountree bragged of his work "The chief reason for my accepting the nomination in '98 to the legislature was to see if I could do something to prevent a re-occurrence of the 1898 political upheaval by affecting a change in the suffrage law ... I, as chairman, did all the work."

The clause remained in effect until 1915, when the Supreme Court ruled it unconstitutional.

==== Ushering in "Jim Crow" ====
After the coup, the Democrats began to pass the state's first racial hierarchy laws, prohibiting blacks and whites from sitting together on trains, steamboats, and in courtrooms, and even requiring blacks and whites to use separate Bibles. Nearly every aspect of public life was codified to separate poor whites and blacks.

These laws, a direct result of the brief political alliance between blacks and poor whites, not only encouraged whites to see black people as outcasts and pariahs, but also rewarded them for doing so, socially and psychologically. This contributed to voluntary separation; prior to the insurrection, whites and blacks in Wilmington had lived close to one another, but over the following years, physical segregation increased between blacks and whites throughout the state, with home value, social status, and quality of life improving for whites the further they physically lived away from blacks. This served to lessen political democracy in the area, and enhance the oligarchical rule of the descendants of the former slaveholding class.

Through 1908, Democrats in other southern states began following North Carolina's example by suppressing the black vote, through disenfranchisement laws or constitutional amendments, of their own. They also passed laws mandating racial segregation of public facilities, and martial law-like impositions on African Americans. The US Supreme Court upheld such measures.

=== Election of 1900 ===
Two years after the coup, the Democrats again ran on "negro domination" with disenfranchisement of blacks on the ballot. Gubernatorial candidate Charles Aycock (one of the campaign's orators) used what happened at Wilmington as a warning to those who dared to challenge the Democrats. He stated that disenfranchisement would keep the peace.

When the votes in Wilmington were counted, only twenty-six people voted against black disenfranchisement, demonstrating the effect of the coup on local sentiment.

North Carolina Gubernatorial Elections
| Year | Republican Vote | Democrat Vote | Populist Vote | Total |
|---|---|---|---|---|
| 1896 | 154,025 | 145,286 | 30,943 | 330,254 |
| 1900 | 126,296 | 186,650 | 0 | 312,946 |
| 1904 | 79,505 | 128,761 | 0 | 208,266 |

== Historical recounting ==
=== "Race riot" ===
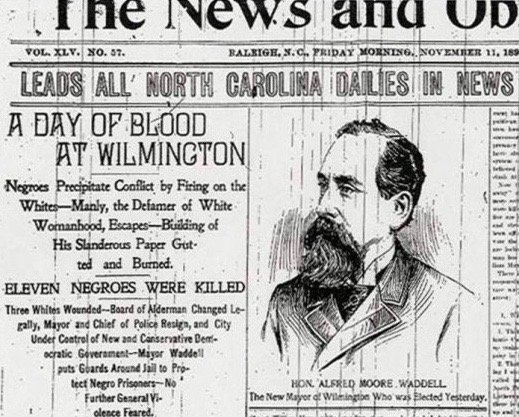
The News & Observer of Raleigh. Re-framing of events.

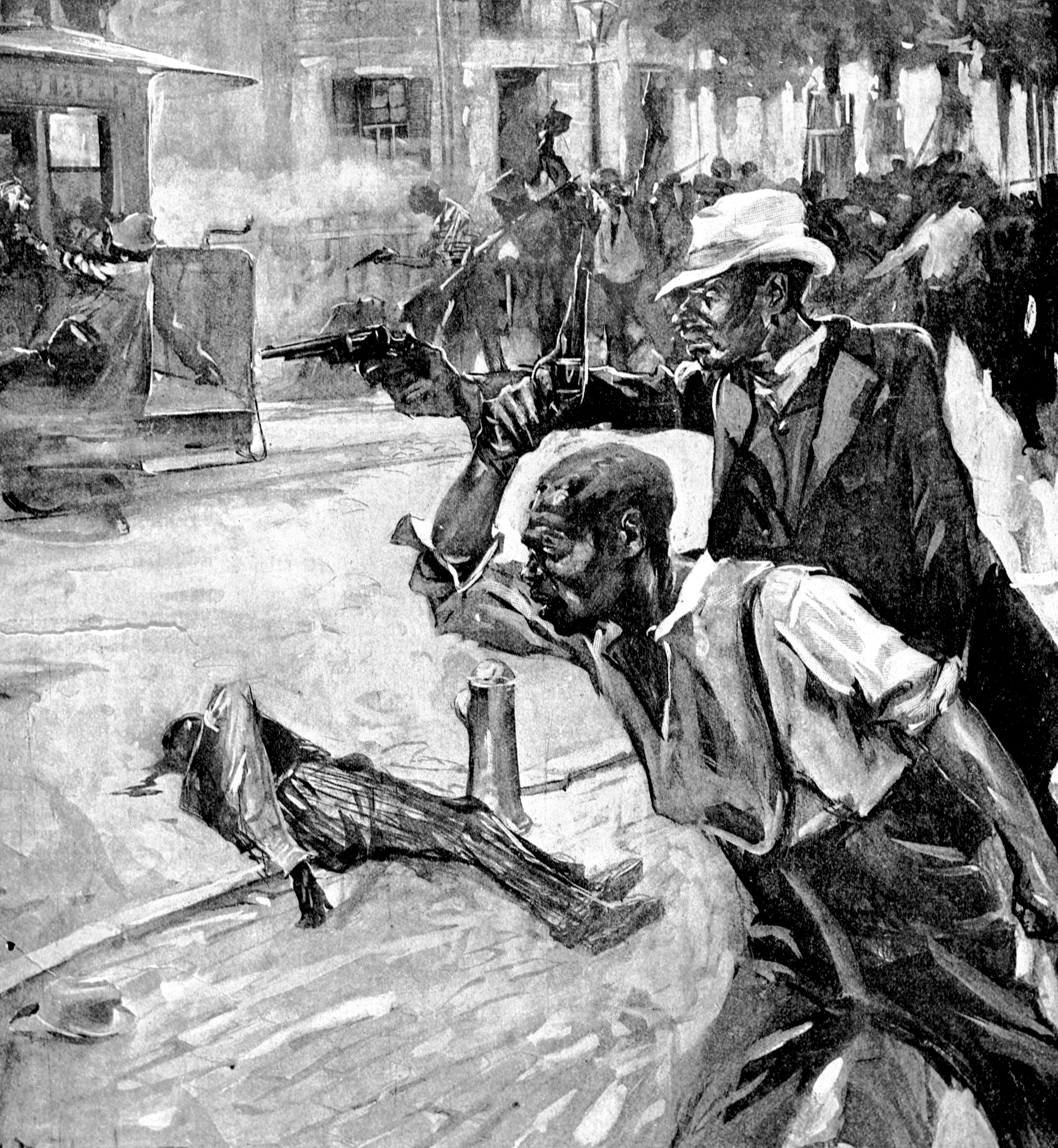
Hugh W. Ditzler illustration for Alfred Waddell's "The Story of the Wilmington, N.C. Race Riots". Collier's Weekly, November 26, 1898.

On November 26, 1898, Collier's Weekly published an article in which Waddell wrote about the government overthrow. The article, "The Story of The Wilmington, North Carolina, Race Riots" included an early use of the term "race riot".

Despite vowing to "choke the Cape Fear River with carcasses", and the fact that some members of the white mob posed for a photograph in front of the charred remnants of The Daily Record, in the article Waddell painted himself as a reluctant, non-violent leader – or accidental hero – "called upon" to lead under "intolerable conditions". He painted the white mob not as murderous lawbreakers, but as peaceful, law-abiding citizens who simply wanted to restore law and order. He also portrayed any violence committed by whites as either being accidental or executed in self-defense, effectively laying blame on both sides:

Demand was made for the negroes to reply to our ultimatum to them [to destroy the black newspaper and leave town forever, or have it destroyed/be removed by force], and their reply was delayed or sent astray (whether purposely or not, I do not know), and that caused all the trouble." ... ...

We wrecked the [newspaper] house. I believe that the fire which occurred was purely accidental; it certainly was unintentional on our part ... ...

I waited until next morning at nine o'clock and then I made the troops form a hollow square in front of the jail. We placed the scoundrels in the midst of the square and marched them to the railroad station. I bought and gave them tickets to Richmond, and told them to go and to never show up again. That bunch were all negroes."

"When I made the speech in the Opera House they were astounded. One of the leaders said "My God! when so conservative a man as Colonel Waddell talks about filling the river with dead niggers, I want to get out of town!" ... ...

Although individuals of both races pointed to Democrat-backed violence as the driver behind the incident, the national narrative largely cast black men as aggressors, legitimizing the coup as a direct result of black aggression. For example, The Atlanta Constitution, a newspaper in Atlanta, Georgia, justified the violence as a rational defense of white honor, and a necessary response against the "criminal element of the blacks", furthering stereotypes of black violence.

The complex reasons for the coup were overlooked in Waddell's account, which disregarded the overthrow as a carefully planned conspiracy, established the historical narrative as the coup being an event that "spontaneously happened", and helped usher in the Solid South. Complemented by Hugh Ditzler's illustration depicting blacks as gun-welding aggressors, Waddell and Ditzler identified the event as a "race riot" perpetrated by Wilmington blacks, and set the precedent for its application which is still used today.

The events in Wilmington on Nov. 10, 1898, was referred to as a race riot by the North Carolina Legislature in 2000 when it set up the 1898 Wilmington Race Riot Commission. That is the term used to this day (2018) by the State Archives of North Carolina, North Carolina Department of Natural and Cultural Resources, and the State Library of North Carolina, in its online NCPedia.

=== "Race Riot" vs. "Massacre" vs. "Insurrection" ===
Waddell's Harper's Weekly account framed the violence, and the coup, with a "noble" narrative, comparing the events to the cause of the "Men of the Cape Fear" during the American Revolution. For many whites, the gallant framing remained, as the perpetrators of the coup were deemed to be "revolutionary" heroes who led an "insurrection" against a "riotous" black menace. For example, immediately, following the coup, the coup participants began reshaping the language of the events. For example, William Parsley, a former Confederate Lieutenant-Colonel, wrote of Wilmington's blacks:

... every blessed one of them [blacks] had a pistol of some sort and many of them rifles and shotguns loaded with buckshot.

Supporting that account, Mr. Kramer, a white Wilmington alderman, added:

In the riot, the Negro was the aggressor. I believe that the whites were doing God's service, as the results for good have been felt in business, in politics and in Church.

Conversely, the black survivors and community maintained that the event was a "massacre". A survivor of the incident, who fled the city, Rev. Charles S. Morris, told his account of the event before the International Association of Colored Clergymen in January 1899:

Nine Negroes massacred outright; a score wounded and hunted like partridges on the mountain; one man, brave enough to fight against such odds would be hailed as a hero anywhere else, was given the privilege of running the gauntlet up a broad street, where he sank ankle deep in the sand, while crowds of men lined the sidewalks and riddled him with a pint of bullets as he ran bleeding past their doors; another Negro shot twenty times in the back as he scrambled empty handed over a fence; thousands of women and children fleeing in terror from their humble homes in the darkness of the night ... crouched in terror from the vengeance of those who, in the name of civilization, and with the benediction of the ministers of the Prince of Peace, inaugurated the reformation of the city of Wilmington the day after the election by driving out one set of white office holders and filling their places with another set of white office holders – the one being Republican and the other Democrat. All this happened, not in Turkey, nor in Russia, nor in Spain, not in the gardens of Nero, nor in the dungeons of Torquemada, but within three hundred miles of the White House, in the best State in the South, within a year of the twentieth century, while the nation was on its knees thanking God for having enabled it to break the Spanish yoke from the neck of Cuba. This is our civilization. This is Cuba's kindergarten of ethics and good government. This is Protestant religion in the United States, that is planning a wholesale missionary crusade against Catholic Cuba. This is the golden rule as interpreted by the white pulpit of Wilmington.

Revisionists dispute the white supremacist aspect of the event often by 1) denying the culpability of the white actors and 2) framing the cause of the white actors as noble.

Arguments that deny culpability, such as equating blame onto blacks, shifts blame away from the white actors and places it onto black residents and their white allies. "Noble" arguments stress that the white actors were not bad people, but honorable souls who were only fighting for "law and order". By not recognizing that the white actors sought "law and order" through criminality and violence, the goodness, valor and values of their ancestors remain affirmed.

The branding of the event as a "riot", "insurrection", "rebellion", "revolution", or "conflict", largely remained until the late 20th century due to the accounts of black survivors being minimized, ignored and omitted – as with The Daily Record destroyed, there were no media outlets to provide recorded accounts of blacks – and due to the South's adoption of Jubal Early's literary and cultural point of view of The Lost Cause, in which violence perpetuated by whites, across the American Civil War, Reconstruction, and the Jim Crow era, evolved into a language of vindication and renewal.

The narrative of The Lost Cause allowed the North and the South to emotionally re-unify. It brought sentimentalism, by political argument, and recurrent celebrations, rituals and public monuments that allowed Southern whites to reconcile their regional pride with their Americanness. It also provided conservative traditions and a model of masculine devotion and courage in an age of gender anxieties and ruthless material striving. However, historians have argued that the reunion was of the North and the South was "exclusively a white man's phenomenon and the price of the reunion was the sacrifice of the African Americans".

A Gatling gun, and an armed mob, fired upon people prevented from arming themselves. However, the dissonance over the nomenclature of this fact, between blacks and whites, caused controversy about how to address its historical retelling, and also how to deal with the effects of the event's outcome.

=== 1998 Centennial Commission ===
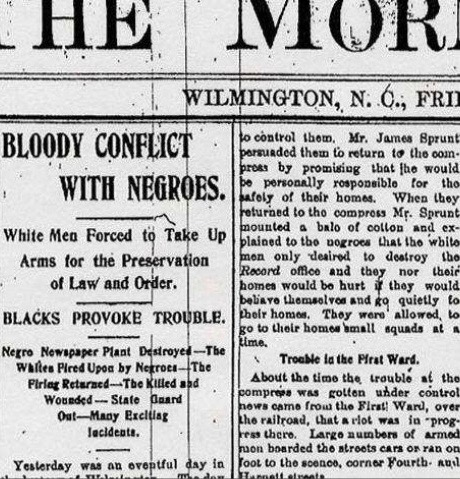
Wilmington Morning Star

By the early 1990s, different groups in the city told and understood different histories of the events, sparking interest to discuss and commemorate the coup, following efforts to recognize similar atrocities in which white-led mobs destroyed the black communities, such as in Rosewood and Tulsa, respectively.

In 1995, informal conversations began among the African-American community, UNC-Wilmington's university faculty, and civil rights activists in order to educate residents about what really happened on that day, and to agree on a monument to memorialize the event. On November 10, 1996, the town of Wilmington held a program inviting the community to help make plans for the 1998 Centennial Commemoration of the coup. Over 200 people attended, including local state representatives and members of the city council. Some descendants of the white supremacy leaders of 1898 were opposed to any type of commemoration.

In early 1998, Wilmington planned a series of "Wilmington in Black and White" lectures, bringing in political leaders, academic specialists and civic rights activists, as well as facilitators such as Common Ground. George Rountree III attended a discussion held at St. Stephen's AME Church, attracting a large crowd, as his grandfather was one of the leaders of the 1898 violence. Rountree spoke of his personal support for racial equality, of his relationship with his grandfather, and of his refusal to apologize for his grandfather's actions as "the man was the product of his times". Other descendants of the coup's participants also said they owed no apologies, as they had no part in their ancestors' actions.

Many listeners argued with Rountree about his position and refusal to apologize. One attendee said that although Rountree was not responsible for those massacre and its aftermath, he was a beneficiary. Kenneth Davis, an African American, spoke of African Americans' achievements following the Civil War, which achievements Rountree's grandfather and others had extinguished, and said that what Wilmington's black community understood of their history was not the history of Rountree's liking.

=== 1898 Wilmington Race Riot Commission ===
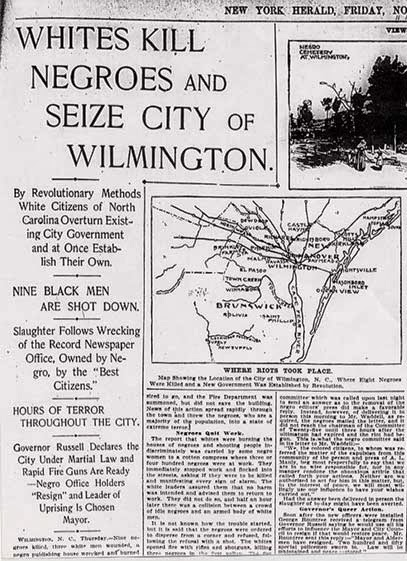
New York Herald, November 11, 1898

In 2000, the state legislature recognized that the black community had suffered severely, politically and economically, following the coup, especially due to state disenfranchisement and Jim Crow laws. The state legislature created the 13-member, biracial, 1898 Wilmington Race Riot Commission to develop a historical record of the event and to assess the economic impact of the riot on blacks locally and across the region and state, co-chaired by state legislator Thomas E. Wright.

The Commission studied the riot for nearly six years, after hearing from numerous sources and scholars. The Commission produced a lengthy report on the event, authored by state archivist, LeRae Umfleet, finding that the violence was "part of a statewide effort to put white supremacist Democrats in office and stem the political advances of black citizens". Harper Peterson, former mayor of Wilmington and a member of the commission, said "Essentially, it crippled a segment of our population that hasn't recovered in 107 years." According to Umfleet, "'massacre', rather than 'riot', does apply. That's a big, strong word, but that's what it was."

The commission made broad recommendations for reparations by government and businesses that would benefit not only African-American descendants, but also the entire community. The Commission recommended 10 bills to the North Carolina Legislature, to correct the century-old damage with reparations for victims' descendants through economic and business development, scholarships, and other programs. The Legislature did not pass any of them.

Historians noted that The News & Observer of Raleigh had contributed to the riots by publishing inflammatory stories, in addition to the results of the elections in Wilmington. This encouraged white men from other parts of the state to travel to Wilmington, to take part in the attacks against blacks, including the coup d'état. Articles in the Charlotte Observer have also been cited as adding to the inflamed emotions. The Commission asked the newspapers to make scholarships available to minority students and to help distribute copies of the commission report. The commission "also asked that New Hanover County, which includes the city, be placed under special federal supervision through the Voting Rights Act", to ensure that current voter registration and voting are conducted without discrimination.

=== Commemorations ===
Several commemorations of the event have taken place:

- Former Star-News reporter, Harry Hayden, released a romanticized accounting of the overthrow in his 1936 pamphlet, The Story of the Wilmington Rebellion, in which he rebranded the event a "Revolution" that had saved North Carolina from Reconstruction.
- Helen G. Edmonds addressed the riot in her 1951 work, The Negro and Fusion Politics in North Carolina, 1894–1901, writing "In reality, the Democrats effected a coup d'etat." As the predominant view of the time reflected the Dunning School's disparagement of Reconstruction, and white historians commonly referred to the events as a "race riot", equally attributing blame to blacks, many overlooked Edmonds' assessment of the events.
- In November 2006, the News and Observer deemed the coup as being "a giant shadow hanging over it". It issued a Special Feature that acknowledged its own role as a leader in the coup's propaganda effort under Josephus Daniels.
- In 2006,The Charlotte Observer said that it "wanted to be the right side of history" and issued an editorial with a full apology for its role in the coup:

We apologize to the black citizens and their descendants whose rights and interests we disregarded and to all North Carolinians, whose trust we betrayed by our failure to fairly report the news and stand firm against injustice.

- In January 2007, the North Carolina Democratic Party officially acknowledged and renounced the actions by party leaders during the Wilmington insurrection and the white supremacy campaigns.
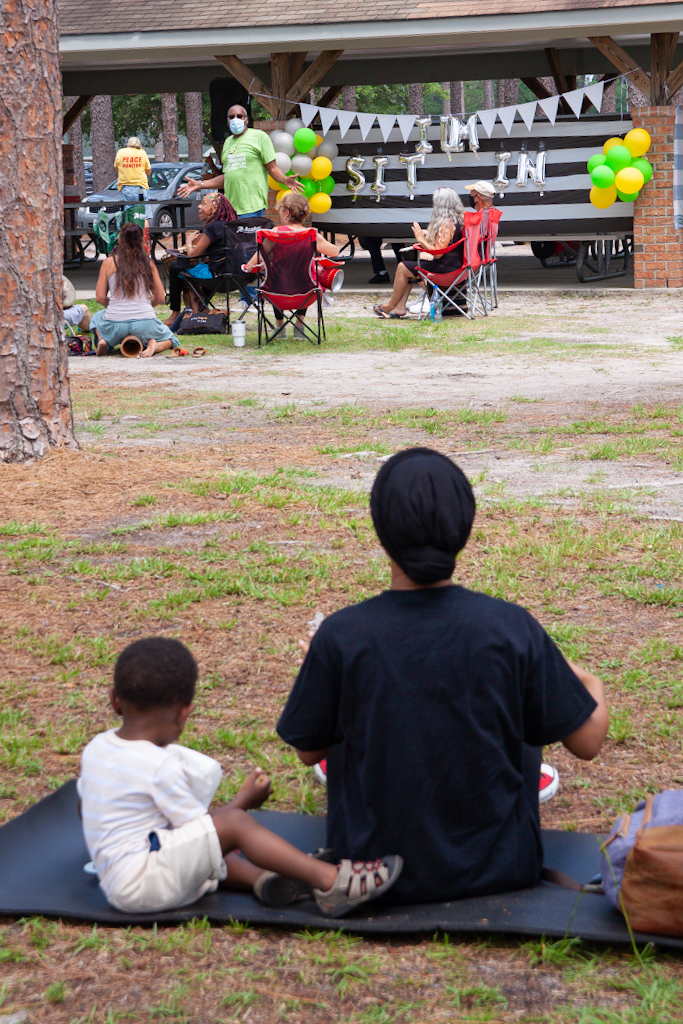
  BLM Protests in 2020 gave rise to a sit-in and petition that led to the renaming of Hugh MacRae Park as Long Leaf Park.
- In April 2007, Representatives Wright, Jones and Harrell introduced House Bill #1558, the "1898 Wilmington Riot Reconciliation Act", into the North Carolina General Assembly. The Act would allow the estates of those injured, killed, or who suffered personal or property losses, resulting from the events on November 10 to file a lawsuit against the city for redress. The loss would have to be valued and any payout would be adjusted by 8 percent for inflation. The Bill never advanced beyond its introduction.
- In August 2007, the state senate passed a resolution acknowledging and expressing "profound regret" for the riot.
- In 2007, some advocates lobbied to get the coup covered in the state's school curriculum, while historians have sought to build a memorial at the corner of Third and Davis Streets in Wilmington to commemorate the incident.
- In January 2017, two Wilmington writers, John Jeremiah Sullivan and Joel Finsel, backed by the creative writing department at UNCW, began working with middle school students, at Williston School and the Friends School of Wilmington, to locate, salvage and transcribe copies of The Daily Record. After the newspaper was destroyed, W.H. Bernard, the [then] editor of the Wilmington Morning Star, offered to purchase any outstanding copies of The Daily Record for 25 cents each. After six months, the group located eight pages; however, only seven of those pages are legible. The pages will eventually be available through the Library of Congress' "Chronicling America" digital series, and through the Digital Heritage Center's public website.
- In January 2018, North Carolina's Highway Historical Marker Committee approved the installation of a plaque to commemorate the event. The plaque was installed later in 2018, on Market Street between Fourth Street and Fifth Street, which is the location of the Light Infantry Building, where the rioting began.
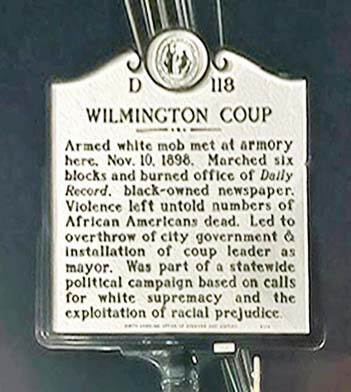
  Wilmington Coup Historical Highway Marker
  The plaque states:

Armed white mob met at armory here, Nov. 10, 1898. Marched six blocks and burned office of Daily Record, black-owned newspaper. Violence left untold numbers of African Americans dead. Led to overthrow of city government & installation of coup leader as mayor. Was part of a statewide political campaign based on calls for white supremacy and the exploitation of racial prejudice.

== In media ==
- Charles W. Chesnutt's novel, The Marrow of Tradition (1901), addressed the rise of white supremacists in North Carolina and described a fictional account of a riot in a city based on Wilmington; it was more accurate than contemporary portrayals by Southern white newspapers. He portrayed the riots as initiated in white violence against blacks, with extensive damage suffered by the black community.
- In The Leopard's Spots (1902), North Carolina author Thomas Dixon Jr. (who wrote "The Clansman" upon which the 1915 film The Birth of a Nation was based), historicizes in considerable detail the 1898 white supremacy campaign and Wilmington massacre."
- Wilmington author Philip Gerard wrote a novel, Cape Fear Rising (1994), that recounts the 1898 campaign and events leading to the burning of the Daily Record.
- John Sayles portrayed the Wilmington Insurrection in Book Two of his novel, A Moment in the Sun (2011), based on contemporary primary sources. Sayles combines fictional characters with historical figures.
- David Bryant Fulton, writing under the name Jack Thorne, wrote the novel Hanover; or, The Persecution of the Lowly. A Story of the Wilmington Massacre (2009).
- Barbara Wright's young adult novel, Crow (2012), portrays the events through a fictional young African-American boy, the son of a reporter on the black newspaper. Her work was named a Notable Social Studies Trade Book in 2013 by the National Council for the Social Studies.
- Wilmington on Fire, a documentary about the Wilmington insurrection directed by Christopher Everett, was released in 2015.
- David Zucchino won the 2021 Pulitzer Prize for General Nonfiction for Wilmington's Lie: The Murderous Coup of 1898 and the Rise of White Supremacy (2020). The book uses contemporary newspaper accounts, diaries, letters and official communications to create a narrative that weaves together individual stories of hate and fear and brutality.
- In the 2021 episode of the Criminal podcast titled "If it ever happens, run", host Phoebe Judge tells the story of the Wilmington insurrection through a combination of narrative and interviews.
- The November 2, 2022 episode of the BBC World Service's "Sounds" discussed the Wilmington Insurrection and its impact on black fiddler Frank Johnson.
- PBS American Experience installment, American Coup: Wilmington 1898 (2024)

== See also ==
- African Americans in North Carolina
- List of conflicts in the United States
- List of ethnic riots#United States
- List of expulsions of African Americans
- List of incidents of civil unrest in the United States
- List of massacres in the United States
- Lynching#United States
  - Lynching in the United States#Jim Crow era
    - List of lynching victims in the United States
- Mass racial violence in the United States
- Nadir of American race relations
- Ocoee massacre of 1920
- Political violence in the United States
- Racism in the United States
  - Colorism#United States
    - Anti-Black racism#United States
      - Racism against African Americans
- Terrorism in the United States
  - Domestic terrorism in the United States
    - Timeline of terrorist attacks in the United States
- White supremacy#United States
  - White supremacy in the United States

== Sources ==
- Weller, Frances (July 14, 2020). "Hugh MacRae Park name change to take place immediately, signs removed". WECT.
