= Norman Jennett =

American political cartoonist (1877–1970)

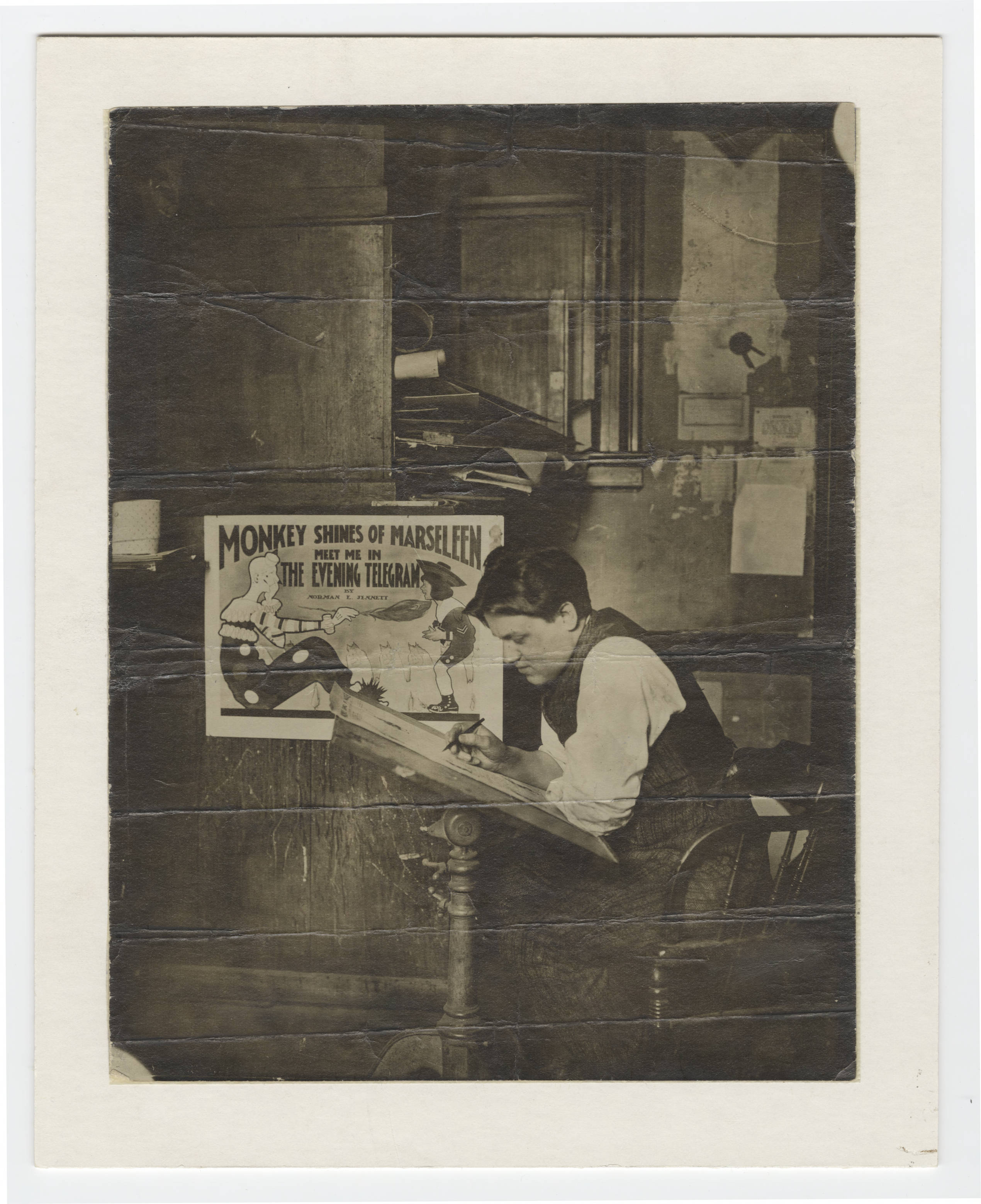
- Born: Norman Ethre Jennett; March 10, 1877; Grantham, North Carolina, U.S.
- Died: January 7, 1970 (aged 92)
- Occupation: Political cartoonist
- Spouse: Helen Mary MacGinness
- Children: 2
- Parent(s): Elijah Stanton Jennett; Clarissa King Jennett

Norman Ethre Jennett (March 10, 1877 – January 7, 1970) was a political cartoonist for newspapers in the United States. He produced cartoons critical of Fusion candidates, Populists, and Republicans. He was nicknamed "Sampson Huckleberry".

He was born in Grantham, North Carolina to Elijah Stanton and Clarissa King Jennett in Wayne County, North Carolina.

He made cartoons for the 1896 and 1898 elections.

He married Helen Mary MacGinness, who was born in Ireland and they were parents to Norman Ethre Jr. and Charlotte Clara Jennett.

He caricatured Republican representatives Charles Alston Cook and Virgil Lusk in the North Carolinian newspaper in Raleigh in 1897.
