= List of United States federal courthouses in Florida =

Following is a list of current and former courthouses of the United States federal court system located in Florida. Each entry indicates the name of the building along with an image, if available, its location and the jurisdiction it covers, the dates during which it was used for each such jurisdiction, and, if applicable the person for whom it was named, and the date of renaming. Dates of use will not necessarily correspond with the dates of construction or demolition of a building, as pre-existing structures may be adapted or court use, and former court buildings may later be put to other uses. Also, the official name of the building may be changed at some point after its use as a federal court building has been initiated.

== Courthouses ==
Courthouse	City	Image	Street address	Jurisdiction	Dates of use	Named for
U.S. Post Office, Custom House, and Courthouse	Fernandina		401 Centre Street	S.D. Fla. M.D. Fla.	1912–1962; 1962–? Still in use as a post office.	n/a
U.S. Federal Bldg & Courthouse	Fort Lauderdale		299 East Broward Boulevard, Suite 312	S.D. Fla.	1979–present	n/a
U.S. Courthouse & Federal Building	Fort Myers		2110 First Street	M.D. Fla.	1998–present	n/a
George Whitehurst U.S. Courthouse	Fort Myers		2301 First Street	S.D. Fla. M.D. Fla.	1952–1962; 1962–1998; Construction completed in 1933; now used as an arts center.	George William Whitehurst
Old Fort Pierce Post Office	Fort Pierce		500 Orange Avenue	S.D. Fla.	1935–?	n/a
U.S. Courthouse^{†}	Gainesville		25 Southeast 2nd Place	N.D. Fla.	1911–1964; Now in use as the Hippodrome State Theatre.	n/a
U.S. Courthouse	Gainesville		401 SE First Avenue, Room 243	N.D. Fla.	1964–present	n/a
U.S. Post Office & Courthouse	Jacksonville		Hogan & Forsyth Sts.	S.D. Fla.	1895–1933; Razed in 1948	n/a
Ed Austin Building	Jacksonville		311 West Monroe Street	S.D. Fla. M.D. Fla. 5th Cir.	1933–1962; 1962–2003; 1948–1981; Now offices of the State Attorney General	Ed Austin
Bryan Simpson United States Courthouse	Jacksonville		300 North Hogan Street	M.D. Fla. Also a satellite office of the 11th Cir.	2002–present	Court of Appeals Judge John Milton Bryan Simpson
Old Post Office & Customshouse^{†}	Key West		281 Front Street	S.D. Fla.	1891–1932; Now the Key West Museum of Art & History.	n/a
Sidney M. Aronovitz U.S. Courthouse	Key West		301 Simonton Street	S.D. Fla.	1933–present	District Court judge Sidney M. Aronovitz (2009)
U.S. Post Office & Courthouse	Marianna		4396 Lafayette Street	N.D. Fla.	1928–? Still in use as a post office.	n/a
U.S. Post Office, Courthouse, & Customhouse	Miami		100 NE 1st Avenue	S.D. Fla.	1914–1932; Now privately owned.	n/a
David W. Dyer Federal Building & U.S. Courthouse	Miami		300 Northeast 1st Avenue	S.D. Fla.	1933–2008	District court judge David W. Dyer
C. Clyde Atkins U.S. Courthouse	Miami		301 North Miami Avenue	S.D. Fla.	?–present	C. Clyde Atkins
Wilkie D. Ferguson, Jr. U.S. Courthouse	Miami		400 North Miami Avenue	S.D. Fla.	2005–present	Wilkie D. Ferguson
James L. King Federal Justice Building	Miami		99 Northeast 4th Street	S.D. Fla.	1996–present	James Lawrence King
Golden-Collum Memorial Federal Building & U.S. Courthouse	Ocala		207 NW Second Street	M.D. Fla.	?–present	Harold Golden and William Edward Collum, the first and last service members from Ocala to die in the Vietnam War
U.S. Post Office & Courthouse	Ocala		?	S.D. Fla.	1909–1956; Razed ca. 1956	n/a
U.S. Post Office & Court House	Orlando		51 East Jefferson Street	S.D. Fla. M.D. Fla.	1941–1962; 1962-1974; Still in use as a post office.	n/a
George C. Young Federal Building & Courthouse	Orlando		80 North Hughey Avenue	M.D. Fla.	1975–present	George C. Young
U.S. Courthouse	Orlando		401 West Central Boulevard	M.D. Fla.	2007–present	n/a
U.S. Courthouse	Panama City		30 West Government Street	N.D. Fla.	?–present	n/a
U.S. Courthouse^{†}	Pensacola		223 South Palafox Street	N.D. Fla.	1887–1939; Now owned by Escambia County	n/a
Winston E. Arnow Federal Building†	Pensacola		100 North Palafox Street	N.D. Fla.	1939–present Now in use by the U.S. Bankruptcy Court for the Northern District of Florida.	District Court judge Winston E. Arnow (2004)
U.S. Courthouse	Pensacola		1 North Palafox Street	N.D. Fla.	1998–present	n/a
Government House†	Saint Augustine		48 King Street	D. Fla. N.D. Fla	1845–1847; 1847-1868; Original building from the Spanish colonial period; now the Government House Museum.	n/a
U.S. Courthouse	Tallahassee		Southeast corner McCarthy & Adams Sts.	N.D. Fla.	1895–1936; Razed in 1964	n/a
U.S. Courthouse	Tallahassee		110 East Park Avenue	N.D. Fla.	1936–? Now in use by the U.S. Bankruptcy Court for the Northern District of Florida.	n/a
Joseph Hatchett United States Courthouse	Tallahassee		111 North Adams Street	N.D. Fla.	1999–present	n/a
U.S. Courthouse Building & Downtown Postal Station^{†}	Tampa		601 North Florida Avenue	S.D. Fla. M.D. Fla.	1905–1962; 1962-2001; Now Meridian Hotel	n/a
Sam M. Gibbons U.S. Courthouse	Tampa		801 North Florida Avenue	M.D. Fla.	1996–present	U.S. Rep. Sam Gibbons
Paul G. Rogers Federal Building & Courthouse	West Palm Beach		701 Clematis Street	S.D. Fla.	1973–present	Paul Grant Rogers

== Key ==
^{†}	Listed on the National Register of Historic Places (NRHP)
^{††}	NRHP-listed and also designated as a National Historic Landmark
