= United States Attorney for the Northern District of Florida =

United States Attorney in Tallahassee, Florida

The United States attorney for the Northern District of Florida is responsible for representing the federal government in the United States District Court for the Northern District of Florida which serves 23 of Florida’s 67 counties. The U.S. attorney for the Northern District of Florida has offices in Tallahassee, Pensacola and Gainesville.

John "Jack" P. Heekin is the interim U.S. attorney, appointed by Attorney General Pam Bondi on May 6, 2025. Heekin also appointed by President Donald J. Trump on the same day. The previous U.S. Attorney was Jason R. Coody, who was appointed by Attorney General Merrick Garland and served from December 26, 2021. Coody's Predecessor was Larry Keefe, who resigned in March 2021, after which Coody was appointed Acting U.S. Attorney.
