= Judge Middlebrooks =

Judge Middlebrooks may refer to:

- David Lycurgus Middlebrooks Jr. (1926–1997), judge of the United States District Court for the Northern District of Florida
- Donald M. Middlebrooks (born 1946), judge of the United States District Court for the Southern District of Florida
