= Augustus Long =

American oil industry business executive

Augustus Calvin Long
- Born: 23 August 1904; Starke, Florida
- Died: 15 November 2001 (aged 97); North, Virginia
- Burial place: Gate of Heaven Cemetery
- Other name: Gus Long
- Education: US Naval Academy (1926)
- Occupation: Business executive
- Spouses: Elizabeth Walsh (m. 1927; died 1963) Doris Ann Penrose (m. 1964)
- Children: 4
- Father: Augustus V. Long
- Military career
- Allegiance: United States
- Branch: United States Navy
- Service years: 1926–1930
- Rank: Lieutenant

Augustus "Gus" Calvin Long (23 August 1904 – 15 November 2001) was an American business executive who was the director of Texaco from 1950 to 1977, serving as President 1953–1956, chairman and CEO 1956–1965, and chairman of the executive committee and CEO 1970–1971.

He was also a director of Freeport Sulphur Co., Equitable Life Assurance Society of the United States, and the Federal Reserve Bank of New York.

== Early life and military service ==
The son of a U.S. Federal District Judge Augustus V. Long, he graduated from the U.S. Naval Academy in 1926 and served at sea for four years.

== Career ==
Long became a Texaco service station supervisor in 1930 in Miami. Appointed as Texaco's marketing General Manager for Ireland in 1932 and manager for the Netherlands in 1934, he was recalled to Navy duty as a Lieutenant during World War II coordinating petroleum supplies for the Allied forces.

== Personal life ==
On 29 November 1926, Long married Elizabeth Walsh. They had three daughters: Elizabeth, Ellen, and Sheila. His first wife died in October 1963. On 19 December 1964 Long remarried to Doris Ann Penrose. They had one daughter, Dorothy.
