= William Bostwick Sheppard =

American judge

Judge of the United States District Court for the Northern District of Florida
- In office September 4, 1907 – April 21, 1934
- Appointed by: Theodore Roosevelt
- Preceded by: Charles Swayne
- Succeeded by: Augustus V. Long

Personal details
- Born: William Bostwick Sheppard; October 4, 1860 Bristol, Florida
- Died: April 21, 1934 (aged 73)
- Education: University of North Carolina at Chapel Hill read law

William Bostwick Sheppard (October 4, 1860 – April 21, 1934) was a United States district judge of the United States District Court for the Northern District of Florida.

== Education and career ==
Born in Bristol, Florida, Sheppard attended the University of North Carolina at Chapel Hill and read law to enter the bar in 1891. He was an unsuccessful candidate for the Florida Senate in 1888. He was a collector of customs at Apalachicola, Florida from 1889 to 1894 and from 1897 to 1901. He was in private practice in Apalachicola from 1891 to 1903, serving as Mayor of Apalachicola in 1894. He was an unsuccessful candidate for Attorney General of Florida in 1896. He was the United States Attorney for the Northern District of Florida from 1903 to 1907.

== Federal judicial service ==
On September 4, 1907, Sheppard received a recess appointment from President Theodore Roosevelt to a seat on the United States District Court for the Northern District of Florida vacated by Judge Charles Swayne. Formally nominated to the same position by President Roosevelt on December 3, 1907, Sheppard was confirmed by the United States Senate on May 20, 1908, and received his commission the same day. Sheppard served in that capacity until his death on April 21, 1934.

== Sources ==
Legal offices
Preceded by Charles Swayne	Judge of the United States District Court for the Northern District of Florida; 1907–1934	Succeeded by Augustus V. Long
