= William Henry Stafford Jr. =

American judge (1931–2025)

Senior Judge of the United States District Court for the Northern District of Florida
- In office May 31, 1996 – July 14, 2025

Chief Judge of the United States District Court for the Northern District of Florida
- In office 1981–1993
- Preceded by: Winston Arnow
- Succeeded by: Maurice M. Paul

Judge of the United States District Court for the Northern District of Florida
- In office May 14, 1975 – May 31, 1996
- Appointed by: Gerald Ford
- Preceded by: David Lycurgus Middlebrooks Jr.
- Succeeded by: Robert Hinkle

United States Attorney for the Northern District of Florida
- In office 1969–1975
- President: Lyndon B. Johnson; Richard Nixon; Gerald Ford
- Preceded by: Clinton N. Ashmore
- Succeeded by: Clinton N. Ashmore

Personal details
- Born: May 11, 1931 Masury, Ohio, U.S.
- Died: July 14, 2025 (aged 94) Pensacola, Florida, U.S.
- Party: Republican
- Spouse: Nancy Marie Helman (m. 1959)
- Children: 3
- Education: Temple University (BS, LLB)

Military service
- Allegiance: United States
- Branch: United States Navy
- Service years: 1956–1960
- Rank: Lieutenant junior grade

William Henry Stafford Jr. (May 11, 1931 – July 14, 2025) was an American judge of the United States District Court for the Northern District of Florida.

== Life and career ==
Born in Masury, Ohio, on May 11, 1931, Stafford received a Bachelor of Science degree from Temple University in 1953 and a Bachelor of Laws from Temple University Beasley School of Law in 1956. He was in the United States Navy as a lieutenant (j.g.) from 1956 to 1960. He was in private practice in Pensacola, Florida from 1961 to 1969. He was an assistant city attorney of Pensacola in 1963. He was State Attorney for the First Judicial Circuit Court of Florida from 1967 to 1969. He was the United States Attorney for the Northern District of Florida from 1969 to 1975.

=== Federal judicial service ===
Stafford was nominated by President Gerald Ford on April 18, 1975, to a seat on the United States District Court for the Northern District of Florida vacated by Judge David Lycurgus Middlebrooks Jr. He was confirmed by the United States Senate on May 12, 1975, and received his commission on May 14, 1975. He served as chief judge from 1981 to 1993. He assumed senior status on May 31, 1996.

=== Death ===
Stafford Jr. died in Pensacola, Florida, on July 14, 2025, at the age of 94.

== See also ==
- List of United States federal judges by longevity of service

== Sources ==
Legal offices
Preceded by David Lycurgus Middlebrooks Jr.	Judge of the United States District Court for the Northern District of Florida; 1975–1996	Succeeded by Robert Hinkle
Preceded by Winston Arnow	Chief Judge of the United States District Court for the Northern District of Florida; 1981–1993	Succeeded by Maurice M. Paul
