= Maurice M. Paul =

American judge (1932–2016)

Maurice Mitchell Paul
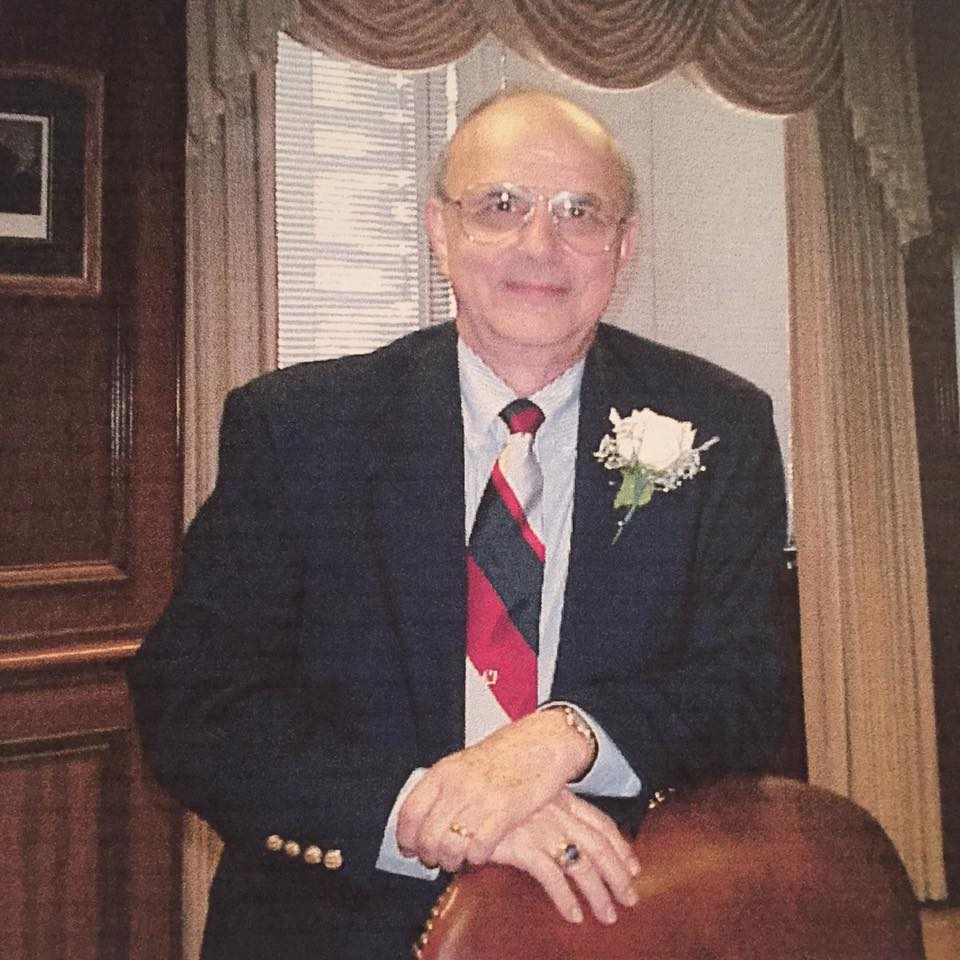
- Paul in 1999

Senior Judge of the United States District Court for the Northern District of Florida
- In office July 31, 1997 – December 29, 2016

Chief Judge of the United States District Court for the Northern District of Florida
- In office 1993–1997
- Preceded by: William Henry Stafford Jr.
- Succeeded by: Roger Vinson

Judge of the United States District Court for the Northern District of Florida
- In office June 21, 1982 – July 31, 1997
- Appointed by: Ronald Reagan
- Preceded by: Winston Arnow
- Succeeded by: Stephan P. Mickle

Personal details
- Born: Maurice Mitchell Paul; May 16, 1932 Jacksonville, Florida
- Died: December 29, 2016 (aged 84) Orlando, Florida
- Education: University of Florida (B.S.B.A.); University of Florida College of Law (LL.B.)

Maurice Mitchell Paul (May 16, 1932 – December 29, 2016) was an American lawyer and a United States district judge of the United States District Court for the Northern District of Florida.

== Education and early career ==
Judge Paul was born in Jacksonville, Florida in 1932. He grew up in a family of modest means at the height of the Great Depression and World War II. Starting when he was a young boy, he worked a variety of jobs to help his family. He delivered groceries by bicycle, worked summers at a pig farm in Georgia, picked fruit, delivered papers and gathered cans and bottles to make ends meet. Eventually, he made his way to the University of Florida where he received his Bachelor of Science in Business Administration degree from the University of Florida in 1954.

While at the University of Florida, he participated in Reserve Officers' Training Corps, and, upon graduation, he served in the United States Air Force from 1954 to 1957, training in Nevada and California and eventually piloting bombers in the Strategic Air Command's atomic bomb fleet based in Riverside, California.

During his time in the Air Force, he married Eleanor James Paul, his inseparable companion until her death in June 2012. She was an emergency room nurse until 1963, when their son, James Jeffrey Paul, was born. James Jeffrey Paul was an author living in Orlando, Florida, and New York City.

After leaving the Air Force, Paul was admitted to the University of Florida College of Law, receiving his Bachelor of Laws, with honors and Order of the Coif in 1960. Paul then served as an interim instructor at the University of Florida College of Law in 1960.

== Private legal practice ==
In 1961, Judge Paul moved to Orlando and spent a dozen years in private practice, working at Sanders, McEwan as an associate until becoming a partner at Akerman, Senterfitt in 1965. After that, he became a name partner in Pitts, Eubanks, Ross & Paul before going out on his own.

Notably, Judge Paul was involved in creating the Reedy Creek Improvement District, the immediate governing jurisdiction for the land of the Walt Disney World Resort in Orlando. The district was conceived to have almost total autonomy within its borders, to allow Walt Disney to carry out his plans with more independence. Services such as land use regulation and planning, building codes, surface water control, drainage, waste treatment, utilities, roads, bridges, fire protection, emergency medical services and environmental services were overseen by the district, and the only areas where the district had to submit to the county and state were property taxes and elevator inspections. This was enshrined in the Reedy Creek Improvement Act.

== State judicial service ==
Judge Paul was a circuit judge of the Ninth Judicial Circuit of Florida from 1973 to 1982.

In 1976, Judge Paul presided over the controversial murder trial of William "Tommy" Zeigler, who was accused of a quadruple murder in his furniture store on Christmas Eve, 1975, in Winter Garden, Florida. The jury found Zeigler guilty and recommended life imprisonment, but Paul overruled the jury's recommendation of a life sentence and sentenced Zeigler to death. The Florida Supreme Court, in a detailed 17-page opinion, affirmed the conviction, opining that "[t]he facts supporting the sentence of death are clear, convincing, and are established beyond a reasonable doubt."

Despite this ruling, Zeigler and his supporters have provided a steady stream of arguments calling into question the actions of the judiciary, state prosecutors and police. Zeigler's supporters argue that Judge Paul did not recuse himself even though shortly before the murders, Judge Paul and Zeigler had been character witnesses on opposing sides of another contentious case in which Zeigler's side won. In 1984, the Florida Supreme Court held that Zeigler had procedurally defaulted this claim because he could have raised it by the close of the trial but did not.

Other arguments include that the murder investigation was complicated and the trial rushed and complicated, that the verdict was returned only after Judge Paul, without the defense team's knowledge, arranged for the hold-out juror's doctor to prescribe her Valium, and that a statement by Judge Paul during a conversation between the government and Judge Paul revealed bias on the part of Judge Paul. In 1984, the Florida Supreme Court held that all but two of these arguments—one involving an allegation of ineffective assistance of counsel and the other involving the allegation of judicial bias based on Judge Paul's conversation with the government—were procedurally defaulted because they were presented and rejected on direct appeal, or could have been presented, at trial or on direct appeal, but were not.

The Court rejected the ineffective assistance of counsel claim on the merits and then remanded the judicial bias claim for an evidentiary hearing. After an evidentiary hearing, Circuit Judge R. James Stoker (who replaced Judge Paul upon the latter's appointment to the federal bench) denied the judicial bias claim. The Florida Supreme Court affirmed the denial of that claim, agreeing with the following statement by Judge Stoker: "the testimony of the sole source of the allegation, Leigh McEachern, is not credible and therefore Petitioner has not proven his claim. The Court finds as a matter of fact that the alleged meeting did not take place and thus the alleged statement was not made."

Mr. Zeigler also sought DNA testing and was granted it in 2001. After reviewing the DNA evidence, the circuit court denied Zeigler's motion under Florida Rule of Criminal Procedure 3.850, and the Florida Supreme Court affirmed, holding that "[t]he trial court's findings of fact are supported by competent, substantial evidence in the record, particularly the evidentiary hearing testimony of the blood stain expert and the DNA testing analyst as well as the 1976 trial testimony of Zeigler and the original blood stain expert."

Today, over 40 years after his conviction, Zeigler remains on Florida's death row still proclaiming his innocence and fighting for renewed DNA testing. His latest petition seeking DNA testing using current DNA testing techniques was denied by the United States Supreme Court on November 13, 2017.

== Federal judicial service ==
Judge Paul was nominated by President Ronald Reagan on April 26, 1982, to a seat on the United States District Court for the Northern District of Florida vacated by Judge Winston Arnow. He was confirmed by the United States Senate on June 18, 1982, and received commission on June 21, 1982. He served as Chief Judge from 1993 to 1997.

Several of his federal cases attracted considerable media attention. For example, in the late 1980s and early 1990s, Judge Paul heard the case of the Rodriguez brothers, who recruited boat captains and crew, airplane pilots, off-loaders and truck drivers to bring more than 100,000 pounds of marijuana and 10,000 pounds of cocaine from across the Caribbean into waterfront mansions in Florida. During the trial of one co-conspirator, witnesses opined that this operation was the background for the show "Miami Vice."

In 2011, Judge Paul ordered Dixie County to remove a 6-ton stone monument listing the Ten Commandments from the steps of the county courthouse. Beneath the commandments, the monument reads in large capital letters, "LOVE GOD AND KEEP HIS COMMANDMENTS." In his order, Judge Paul said, "The actual ownership of the monument, the location and permanent nature of the display make it clear to all reasonable observers that Dixie County chooses to be associated with the message being conveyed."

In 1996, in a case involving French drug kingpin Claude Duboc, Judge Paul found famed attorney F. Lee Bailey in contempt of court, causing Bailey to spend 44 days in jail. Duboc had sold drugs worth hundreds of millions of dollars and had hidden the money in assets all around the world. To support his cooperation with the government, Duboc was to turn over all his ill-gotten assets. Bailey was given the authority to liquidate and turn over these assets to the government. A dispute arose over Bailey's use of certain stocks, and Judge Paul ordered Bailey to submit an accounting of the stocks. Bailey refused, despite being given multiple chances. Eventually, Bailey was disbarred by the Florida Supreme Court based on this conduct.

He assumed senior status on July 31, 1997, serving in that status until his death on December 29, 2016, in Orlando.

== Death and legacy ==
Upon his death in December 2016, Chief Judge M. Casey Rodgers shared the following in an email to the judges and staff in the United States District Court for the Northern District of Florida:

Judge Paul was a giant in both intellect and heart. He was a model judge, and in fact, the one we all looked to for advice and guidance -- he was a true judge's judge. His mentorship to us as judges and also to countless lawyers over the years will never be forgotten. Most of all, he was a dear friend and will be sorely missed.

Legal offices
Preceded by Winston Arnow	Judge of the United States District Court for the Northern District of Florida; 1982–1997	Succeeded by Stephan P. Mickle
Preceded by William Henry Stafford Jr.	Chief Judge of the United States District Court for the Northern District of Florida; 1993–1997	Succeeded by Roger Vinson
