= John Heekin =

American lawyer

John "Jack" Heekin
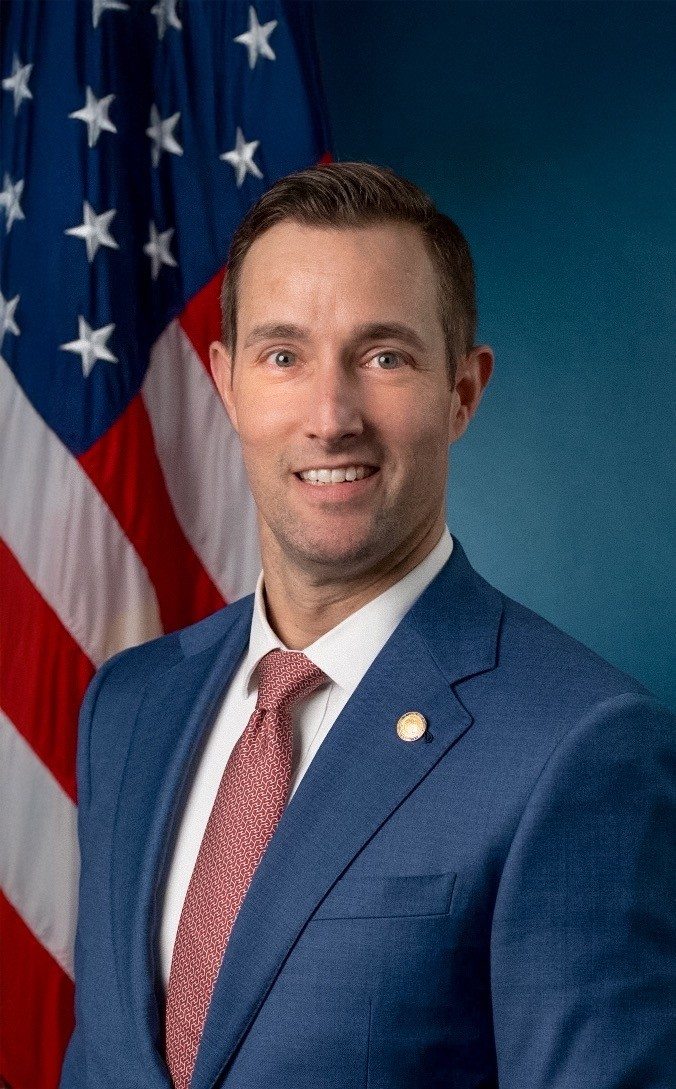

United States Attorney for the Northern District of Florida
- Incumbent
- Assumed office June 2, 2025; Interim: June 2, 2025 – October 7, 2025
- President: Donald Trump
- Preceded by: Jason Coody

Personal details
- Education: Bucknell University (BA); Columbus School of Law (JD)

John "Jack" Peter Heekin is an American lawyer serving as the United States Attorney for the Northern District of Florida. Heekin was previously deputy chief of staff and general counsel for U.S. Senator Rick Scott.

== U.S. Attorney for the Northern District of Florida ==
On May 6, 2025, Heekin was nominated by President Donald Trump to be the United States Attorney for the Northern District of Florida. On June 2, 2025, Heekin was sworn in as the interim U.S. Attorney for the Northern District of Florida. He was confirmed by the U.S. Senate for a full term on October 7, 2025.

== Education ==
Heekin earned his bachelor's degree from Bucknell University and his Juris Doctor with a certificate in comparative and international law from the Columbus School of Law.

Legal offices
Preceded by Jason Coody	United States Attorney for the Northern District of Florida; 2025-	Succeeded by Incumbent
