= Mark E. Walker =

American judge (born 1967)

Mark Walker
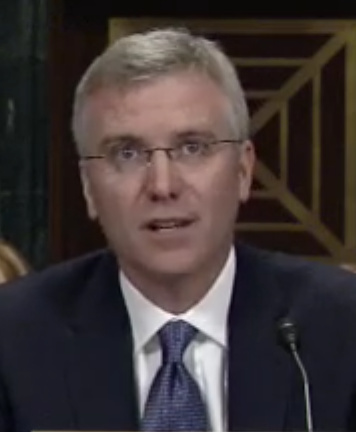

Chief Judge of the United States District Court for the Northern District of Florida
- In office June 23, 2018 – June 23, 2025
- Preceded by: M. Casey Rodgers
- Succeeded by: Allen Winsor

Judge of the United States District Court for the Northern District of Florida
- Incumbent
- Assumed office December 7, 2012
- Appointed by: Barack Obama
- Preceded by: Stephan P. Mickle

Personal details
- Born: Mark Eaton Walker; 1967 (age 58–59) Winter Garden, Florida, U.S.
- Education: University of Florida (BA, JD)

Mark Eaton Walker (born 1967) is a United States district judge of the United States District Court for the Northern District of Florida.

== Biography ==
Born in Winter Garden, Florida, he received his Bachelor of Arts degree from the University of Florida in 1989, graduating first in his class. He received his Juris Doctor from the Fredric G. Levin College of Law at the University of Florida in 1992, magna cum laude. From 1983 to 1993, during high school and during breaks in the academic year in college, Walker worked at a Winn-Dixie, the same store where his father worked. Walker identified his experience working at Winn-Dixie as "the job that, more than any other, helped prepare him to be a lawyer and interact with people." After graduating from law school second in his class, he clerked for Judge Emmett Ripley Cox of the United States Court of Appeals for the Eleventh Circuit from 1993 to 1994. He clerked for Justice Stephen H. Grimes of the Florida Supreme Court from 1994 to 1996. He clerked for Judge Robert Hinkle of the United States District Court for the Northern District of Florida from 1996 to 1997. In July 1997 he spent a short period in private practice, but soon left to work as an assistant public defender for Florida's second judicial circuit. He served as an assistant public defender from 1997 to 1999. He worked in private practice from 1999 to 2009 specializing in civil litigation and criminal defense. From 2009 to 2012, he served as a state circuit judge in Tallahassee.

=== Federal judicial service ===
On February 16, 2012, President Barack Obama nominated Walker to serve as United States district judge for the United States District Court for the Northern District of Florida. He replaced Judge Stephan P. Mickle, who assumed senior status in 2011. His nomination was reported out of committee on June 7, 2012 by a voice vote, with one senator voting "nay". The United States Senate confirmed Walker on December 6, 2012 by a 94–0 vote. He received his commission on December 7, 2012. He became chief judge in June 2018.

== Notable rulings ==
=== Hand v. Scott ===
In January 2018, Walker ruled against Florida and ordered Florida governor Rick Scott to restore the voting rights of felons after their release from prison.

=== League of Women Voters v. Detzner ===
In July 2018, Walker invalidated as unconstitutional Florida's total prohibition on early voting sites on college and university campuses. Walker determined the prohibition violated the First, Fourteenth, and Twenty-Sixth Amendments and the law revealed a "stark pattern of discrimination" against younger voters. Consequently, in the 2018 midterms, nearly 60,000 people voted at the on-campus early voting locations.

=== Keohane v. Jones, et al. ===
Walker ordered the Florida Department of Corrections to continue providing a transgender woman prisoner with hormone treatment and ordered them to provide the prisoner with women's undergarments and grooming products. The prisoner was diagnosed with gender dysphoria but has been housed in a male-only correctional facility. Walker's ruling was ultimately reversed by the Eleventh Circuit Court of Appeals.

=== Madera-Rivera v. Detzner ===
In September 2018, Walker decided another significant voting rights case, in which he granted a preliminary injunction against the Florida secretary of state, directing him to ensure that Spanish speaking voters have access to ballots in the Spanish language for the November 2018 elections. This decision, made on the basis of Section 4(e) of the Voting Rights Act, was especially critical, as Florida was grappling with a recent influx of Puerto Ricans fleeing the aftermath of 2017's Hurricane Maria.

=== League of Women Voters v. Scott ===
After the 2018 midterms, Walker ruled in favor of then-governor Rick Scott who oversaw the state's ongoing recount in which he was a candidate for U.S. Senate. “Though sometimes careening perilously close to a due process violation, Scott’s most questionable conduct has occurred in his capacity as a candidate rather than as governor," Walker wrote. Though Scott's actions were “reckless and haphazard“ and “Scott has toed the line between imprudent campaign-trail rhetoric and problematic state action. But he has not crossed that line."

=== Anti-riot law ===
On September 9, 2021, Walker blocked Florida's anti-riot law as a violation of the First Amendment.

=== University of Florida professors ===
In another free speech case, on January 4, 2022, Walker refused to dismiss a lawsuit filed by professors at the University of Florida after the University tried to stop them from testifying in a voting rights lawsuit.

The ruling eventually blocked the law as incompatible with the First Amendment.

=== League of Women Voters v. Laurel M. Lee ===
On March 30, 2022, Walker ruled that Florida Senate Bill 90 violated the Voting Rights Act, issued a permanent injunction against the law’s restrictions on absentee ballot drop boxes, and required Florida to obtain preclearance from federal courts before enacting election laws.

In an outline of the legislative history of the bill, Walker wrote, "And the exact justification for SB 90 as a whole, and for its constituent parts, is difficult to pin down, with sponsors and supporters offering conflicting or nonsensical rationales."

On May 5, 2022, the 11th Circuit Court of Appeals lifted Walker's order, pending appeal: "The lower court’s ruling relying on an analysis of racism in Florida’s history is 'problematic,' and 'failed to properly account for what might be called the presumption of legislative good faith,' according to the order issued Friday by the U.S. Court of Appeals for the Eleventh Circuit. Additionally, the state has 'a substantial argument' that another provision in the law governing 'line warming' activities outside polling places 'passes constitutional muster,' though the lower court found it to be 'unconstitutionally vague and overbroad,' according to the order. The court also noted the next statewide election is in August, while local elections are ongoing—too close for interfering with state laws administering elections, the judges wrote." The appeals court did not reach the merits, which will be decided in the main appeal.

=== Florida State Conference of Branches and Youth Units of the NAACP, et al v. Cord Byrd, et al. ===
On July 3, 2023, Judge Walker granted a preliminary injunction against SB 7020, a Florida law that barred non-citizens from handling or collecting voter registration forms, and third-party voter registration groups from retaining personal information collected when registering new voters.

=== Florida Amendment 4 intimidation (2024) ===
In October 2024, the Florida Department of Health threatened to bring criminal charges against local TV stations for airing an advertisement in support of Amendment 4—a proposed constitutional amendment to prohibit the Florida legislature from restricting abortion before fetal viability—which it claimed to contain false information regarding current state law. The health department sent out cease-and-desist letters and contracted for $1.4 million with two law firms to pursue litigation against the stations, claiming that the ads constitute a "sanitary nuisance" because it ""threatens or impairs"" the health of Florida residents. In response, a lawsuit was filed by Floridians Protecting Freedom, the group that organized the amendment's ballot initiative.

Judge Walker issued a temporary restraining order against the Florida Department of Health. In his written opinion, he heavily condemned the health department's decision, commenting "it's the First Amendment, stupid".

=== Computer & Communications Industry Association et al v. Uthmeier ===
On June 3, 2025, He would grant a Preliminary Injunction to Florida HB 3 claiming that the law violated the First Amendment and failed Intermediate Scrutiny.

Legal offices
Preceded by Stephan P. Mickle	Judge of the United States District Court for the Northern District of Florida; 2012–present	Incumbent
Preceded by M. Casey Rodgers	Chief Judge of the United States District Court for the Northern District of Florida; 2018–2025	Succeeded by Allen Winsor
