= Judge Collier =

Judge Collier may refer to:

- Curtis Lynn Collier (born 1949), judge of the United States District Court for the Eastern District of Tennessee
- Lacey A. Collier (born 1935), judge of the United States District Court for the Northern District of Florida
