= Cothran =

Cothran is a surname. Notable people with the surname include:

- Charlene Cothran, American journalist
- James S. Cothran (1830–1897), Members of the United States House of Representatives from South Carolina
- Jeff Cothran (born 1971), American football fullback
- Keith Cothran (born 1986), American professional basketball player
- Pamela Cothran Marsh (born 1965), American attorney
- Shirley Cothran (born 1952), American motivational speaker and Miss America winner
- Tom Cothran (1947–1987), American musician and composer
- Thomas P. Cothran (1857–1934), Speakers of the South Carolina House of Representatives
