= McQueen McIntosh =

American judge

Judge of the United States District Court for the Northern District of Florida
- In office March 11, 1856 – January 3, 1861
- Appointed by: Franklin Pierce
- Preceded by: Isaac H. Bronson
- Succeeded by: Philip Fraser

Personal details
- Born: McQueen McIntosh; 1822 Darien, Georgia
- Died: June 18, 1868 (aged 45–46) Pensacola, Florida
- Education: read law

McQueen McIntosh (1822 – June 18, 1868) was a United States district judge of the United States District Court for the Northern District of Florida.

== Education and career ==
Born in 1822, near Darien, Georgia, McIntosh read law. He was a planter in Florida. He entered private practice in Jacksonville, Florida from 1850 to 1586.

== Federal judicial service ==
McIntosh was nominated by President Franklin Pierce on February 27, 1856, to a seat on the United States District Court for the Northern District of Florida vacated by Judge Isaac H. Bronson. He was confirmed by the United States Senate on March 11, 1856, and received his commission the same day. His service terminated on January 3, 1861, due to his resignation.

== Confederate judicial service and death ==
Following his resignation from the federal bench, McIntosh served as a Judge of the Confederate District Court for the District of Florida starting in 1861. He died on June 18, 1868, in Pensacola, Florida.

== Sources ==
Legal offices
Preceded by Isaac H. Bronson	Judge of the United States District Court for the Northern District of Florida; 1856–1861	Succeeded by Philip Fraser
