= Joseph Hatchett United States Courthouse =

United States Courthouse in Tallahassee, Florida

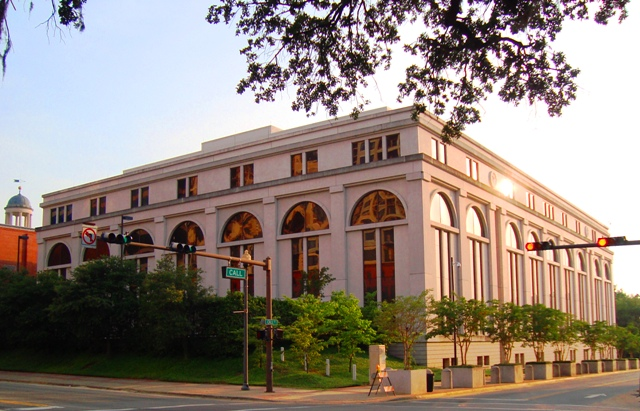
- Interactive map of the Joseph Hatchett United States Courthouse area

General information
- Status: Completed
- Type: Judicial & Office
- Location: 111 North Adams Street, Tallahassee, Florida, United States
- Coordinates: 30.44327°N 84.28136°W
- Construction started: 1997
- Completed: 1999
- Opening: 1999
- Cost: $17 million
- Owner: General Services Administration - Sunbelt Region

Height
- Top floor: 4

Technical details
- Floor count: 4
- Floor area: 169,758 sq ft (15,771.0 m^{2})
- Lifts/elevators: 4

Design and construction
- Architect: Reynolds, Smith & Hills
- Developer: Federal architecture
- Main contractor: Culpepper Construction

The Joseph Hatchett United States Courthouse is a courthouse and U.S. federal government facility in Tallahassee, Florida. It houses:

- The United States District Court for the Northern District of Florida, Tallahassee Division and the United States Attorney for the Northern District of Florida which serves Franklin, Gadsden, Jefferson, Leon, Liberty, Madison, Taylor and Wakulla counties.
- A satellite office of the United States Court of Appeals for the Eleventh Circuit.
- Offices for the United States Probation and Pretrial Services System, the United States Marshals Service, and the United States Trustee Program.

The courthouse was completed in 1999 at a cost of $17 million and opened that same year. It replaced the old former courthouse, which was built in 1935-1936 and now houses the United States bankruptcy court of the Northern District of Florida.

The courthouse displays a mural collection by Lincoln Perry which depict moments in the evolution of our justice system.

The structure comprises six courtrooms, 169,758 square feet (15,771.0 m^{2}) over four floors, with a secure parking facility in the basement. It also includes judge's chambers, administration offices, holding cells and U.S. Marshall's offices. For safety, there is a Security Operations Data Center, detention holding areas and a sally port.

It was named after Joseph W. Hatchett, a federal judge whose service broke racial barriers in the south. He was the first Black judge appointed to Florida's Supreme Court in 1975 by Florida Governor Reubin Askew. He was the first Black man in the U.S. South to be appointed to the federal appeals court in 1979 by President Jimmy Carter. At the time, the 5th circuit had jurisdiction over Alabama, Florida, Georgia, Louisiana, Mississippi, and Texas.

After an act of Congress (S. 2938) passed in the U.S. House of Representatives on June 24, 2022 President Joe Biden signed the measure into law through the Bipartisan Safer Communities Act on June 25, 2022. The courthouse was officially dedicated on June 30, 2023.
