= Lynn Carlton Higby =

American judge

Judge of the United States District Court for the Northern District of Florida
- In office October 5, 1979 – January 3, 1983
- Appointed by: Jimmy Carter
- Preceded by: Seat established by 92 Stat. 1629
- Succeeded by: Roger Vinson

Personal details
- Born: Lynn Carlton Higby; August 6, 1938 Orlando, Florida
- Died: February 10, 1992 (aged 53) Pensacola, Florida
- Education: Emory University (BA, LLB)

Military service
- Allegiance: United States
- Branch/service: United States Navy
- Years of service: 1962–1965
- Unit: United States Navy Reserve

Lynn Carlton Higby (August 6, 1938 – February 10, 1992) was a United States district judge of the United States District Court for the Northern District of Florida.

== Education and career ==
Born in Orlando, Florida, Higby received a Bachelor of Arts degree from Emory University in 1960 and a Bachelor of Laws from Emory University School of Law in 1962. He was in private practice in Atlanta, Georgia in 1962, and was then, in the United States Navy Reserve from 1962 to 1965, returning to private practice in Panama City, Florida from 1965 to 1979.

== Federal judicial service ==
On June 14, 1979, Higby was nominated by President Jimmy Carter to a new seat on the United States District Court for the Northern District of Florida created by 92 Stat. 1629. He was confirmed by the United States Senate on October 4, 1979, and received his commission on October 5, 1979. Higby served in that capacity until his resignation from the bench on January 3, 1983. Higby died on February 10, 1992, in Pensacola, Florida.

== Sources ==
Legal offices
Preceded by Seat established by 92 Stat. 1629	Judge of the United States District Court for the Northern District of Florida; 1979–1983	Succeeded by Roger Vinson
