= Isaac H. Bronson =

American judge

Judge of the United States District Court for the Northern District of Florida
- In office February 23, 1847 – August 13, 1855
- Appointed by: operation of law
- Preceded by: Seat established by 9 Stat. 131
- Succeeded by: McQueen McIntosh

Judge of the United States District Court for the District of Florida
- In office August 8, 1846 – February 23, 1847
- Appointed by: James K. Polk
- Preceded by: Seat established by 5 Stat. 788
- Succeeded by: Seat abolished

Member of the U.S. House of Representatives from New York's 18th district
- In office March 4, 1837 – March 3, 1839
- Preceded by: Daniel Wardwell
- Succeeded by: Thomas C. Chittenden

Personal details
- Born: Isaac Hopkins Bronson; October 16, 1802 Waterbury, Connecticut, or Rutland, New York, US
- Died: August 13, 1855 (aged 52) Palatka, Florida, US
- Resting place: Episcopal Church Cemetery
- Party: Democratic
- Education: read law

Isaac Hopkins Bronson (October 16, 1802 – August 13, 1855) was an American lawyer and jurist who served one term as a United States representative from New York from 1837 to 1839. He later served as a United States district judge of the United States District Court for the District of Florida and the United States District Court for the Northern District of Florida.

== Education and career ==
Born on October 16, 1802, in either Rutland, New York, or Waterbury, Connecticut, Bronson attended the common schools and read law in 1822. He was admitted to the bar and entered private practice in Watertown, New York from 1822 to 1837.

== Congressional service and state judicial service ==
Bronson was elected as a Democrat from New York's 18th congressional district to the United States House of Representatives of the 25th United States Congress, serving from March 4, 1837, to March 3, 1839. He was Chairman of the Committee on Territories for the 25th United States Congress.

=== Judicial appointment ===
Bronson was an unsuccessful candidate for reelection in 1838 to the 26th United States Congress. He was appointed a Judge for the Fifth Judicial District of New York on April 18, 1838, serving from 1839 to 1840.

== Federal judicial service ==
Bronson moved to St. Augustine, St. John's County, Florida Territory, and some years later moved to Palatka, Putnam County, Florida Territory. Bronson was a Judge of the United States District Court for the Eastern District of Florida Territory from 1840 to 1845.

Following the State of Florida's admission to the Union on March 3, 1845, Bronson was nominated by President James K. Polk on May 5, 1846, to the United States District Court for the District of Florida, to a new seat authorized by 5 Stat. 788. He was confirmed by the United States Senate on August 8, 1846, and received his commission the same day. Bronson was reassigned by operation of law to the United States District Court for the Northern District of Florida on February 23, 1847, to a new seat authorized by 9 Stat. 131.

== Death and burial ==
Bronson's service terminated on August 13, 1855, due to his death in Palatka, Florida. He was interred in the Episcopal Church Cemetery.

== Sources ==
- United States Congress. "Isaac H. Bronson (id: B000869)". Biographical Directory of the United States Congress.
- Isaac Hopkins Bronson at the Biographical Directory of Federal Judges, a publication of the Federal Judicial Center.

U.S. House of Representatives
Preceded by Daniel Wardwell	Member of the U.S. House of Representatives from New York's 18th congressional district 1837–1839	Succeeded by Thomas C. Chittenden
Legal offices
Preceded by Seat established by 5 Stat. 788	Judge of the United States District Court for the District of Florida; 1846–1847	Succeeded by Seat abolished
Preceded by Seat established by 9 Stat. 131	Judge of the United States District Court for the Northern District of Florida; 1847–1855	Succeeded by McQueen McIntosh
