= Thomas C. Chittenden =

American politician

Judge of Jefferson County, New York
- In office 1840–1845

Member of the House of Representatives from New York's 18th district
- In office March 4, 1839 – March 3, 1843
- Preceded by: Isaac H. Bronson
- Succeeded by: Preston King

Personal details
- Born: August 30, 1788 Stockbridge, Massachusetts, US
- Died: August 22, 1866 (aged 77) Watertown, New York, US
- Party: Whig
- Occupation: lawyer

Thomas Cotton Chittenden (August 30, 1788 – August 22, 1866) was an American politician who served as a U.S. representative from New York.

Born in Stockbridge, Massachusetts, Chittenden moved to Adams, New York. He studied law. He was admitted to the bar in 1813 and commenced practice in Adams, New York.

Chittenden was elected as a Whig to the Twenty-sixth and Twenty-seventh Congresses (March 4, 1839 – March 3, 1843). He was appointed judge of Jefferson County in 1840, serving for five years. After entering upon his judicial duties, moved to Watertown, New York, the county seat. He resumed the practice of law in Watertown. He also engaged in banking. He died in Watertown, New York, August 22, 1866. He was interred in Brookside Cemetery.

U.S. House of Representatives
Preceded by Isaac H. Bronson	Member of the U.S. House of Representatives from New York's 18th congressional district 1839–1843	Succeeded by Preston King
