= Charles Swayne =

American judge (1842–1907)

Judge of the United States District Court for the Northern District of Florida
- In office May 17, 1889 – July 5, 1907
- Appointed by: Benjamin Harrison
- Preceded by: Thomas Settle
- Succeeded by: William Bostwick Sheppard

Personal details
- Born: August 10, 1842 Guyencourt, Delaware, U.S.
- Died: July 5, 1907 (aged 64)
- Party: Republican
- Education: University of Pennsylvania (LLB)

Charles Swayne (August 10, 1842 – July 5, 1907) was a United States district judge of the United States District Court for the Northern District of Florida. In 1904, he was impeached, but remained on the bench after the impeachment trial ended in an acquittal.

== Education and career ==
Born in Guyencourt, Delaware, Swayne received a Bachelor of Laws from the University of Pennsylvania Law School in 1871. He was in private practice in Philadelphia, Pennsylvania from 1871 to 1885, and in Pensacola, Florida from 1885 to 1889. In 1888, he was an unsuccessful Republican candidate for the Florida Supreme Court.

== Federal judicial service ==
Swayne received a recess appointment from President Benjamin Harrison on May 17, 1889, to a seat on the United States District Court for the Northern District of Florida vacated by Judge Thomas Settle. He was nominated to the same position by President Harrison on December 5, 1889. He was confirmed by the United States Senate on April 1, 1890, and received his commission the same day. His service terminated on July 5, 1907, due to his death.

=== Impeachment and acquittal ===
Swayne was impeached by the United States House of Representatives on December 13, 1904. He was accused of filing false travel vouchers, improper use of private railroad cars, unlawfully imprisoning two attorneys for contempt, and living outside of his district. Swayne's impeachment trial lasted 2 1/2 months before it ended on February 27, 1905, when the Senate voted acquittal on each of the twelve articles. There was little doubt that Swayne was guilty of some of the offenses charged against him. Indeed, his counsel admitted as much, though calling the lapses "inadvertent." The Senate, however, refused to convict Swayne because its members did not believe his peccadilloes amounted to "high crimes and misdemeanors".

It was during the long Swayne trial that the suggestion first surfaced that a Senate committee, rather than the Senate as a whole, should receive impeachment evidence. Senator George F. Hoar of Massachusetts proposed that the presiding officer should appoint such a committee. While Hoar's proposal would eventually be embodied in Rule XI of the Senate's impeachment rules, in 1905 the resolution was referred to the Rules Committee, which took no action.

Legal offices
| Preceded by Thomas Settle | Judge of the United States District Court for the Northern District of Florida; 1889–1907 | Succeeded by William Bostwick Sheppard |
