= Stephan P. Mickle =

American judge (1944–2021)

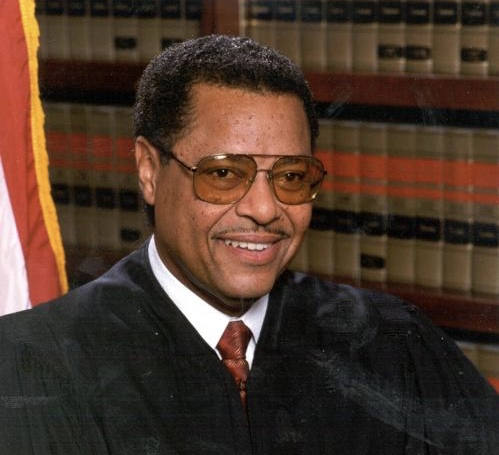
- Judge Stephan P. Mickle

Senior Judge of the United States District Court for the Northern District of Florida
- In office June 22, 2011 – January 26, 2021

Chief Judge of the United States District Court for the Northern District of Florida
- In office 2009–2011
- Preceded by: Robert Hinkle
- Succeeded by: M. Casey Rodgers

Judge of the United States District Court for the Northern District of Florida
- In office May 22, 1998 – June 22, 2011
- Appointed by: Bill Clinton
- Preceded by: Maurice M. Paul
- Succeeded by: Mark E. Walker

Personal details
- Born: June 18, 1944 New York City, New York
- Died: January 26, 2021 (aged 76) Gainesville, Florida
- Education: University of Florida (B.A., M.Ed.); Fredric G. Levin College of Law (J.D.)

Stephan Pierre Mickle (June 18, 1944 – January 26, 2021) was a United States district judge of the United States District Court for the Northern District of Florida.

== Education ==
Mickle was born in New York City, New York. In 1965, he received his Bachelor of Arts degree in political science. He was the first Black undergraduate student to graduate from the University of Florida. In 1966, he received his Master of Education from the University of Florida. Additionally, he received his Juris Doctor from the Fredric G. Levin College of Law at the University of Florida in 1970. He was the second Black student to graduate from the University of Florida Fredric G. Levin College of Law.

== Career ==
Mickle worked briefly as an attorney in the Office of Legal Services at the Equal Employment Opportunity Commission in Washington, D.C. in 1970 and in private practice in Fort Lauderdale, Florida. He returned to Gainesville in 1971, when he became an adjunct professor at the University of Florida College of Law, a post he still held, and entered private practice as the first Black lawyer in Alachua County. Mickle was also a special assistant public defender for the Eighth Judicial Circuit in 1974. Mickle was a judge on the Alachua County Court from 1979 to 1984 and was a circuit judge in Florida's Eighth Judicial Circuit from 1984 to 1992. He served as a judge of the Florida First District Court of Appeal from 1993 to 1998.

== Federal judicial service ==
President Bill Clinton nominated Mickle to the United States District Court for the Northern District of Florida on January 27, 1998, to the seat vacated by Maurice M. Paul. Confirmed by the Senate on May 14, 1998, he received commission on May 22, 1998. He served as Chief Judge from 2009 to 2011. He assumed senior status on June 22, 2011. He died on January 26, 2021.

== Honors ==
Mickle was the first Black man to receive the University of Florida's Distinguished Alumnus Award, in 1999. In January 2022, the Alachua County criminal courthouse was renamed for the late Judge, as the Judge Stephen P. Mickle, Sr. Courthouse.

== See also ==
- List of African-American federal judges
- List of African-American jurists

== Sources ==
- "Stephan P. Mickle Oral History".
- Stephan Mickle at Ballotpedia

Legal offices
Preceded by Maurice M. Paul	Judge of the United States District Court for the Northern District of Florida; 1998–2011	Succeeded by Mark E. Walker
Preceded by Robert Hinkle	Chief Judge of the United States District Court for the Northern District of Florida; 2009–2011	Succeeded by M. Casey Rodgers
