= United States Attorney for the District of Texas =

Defunct U.S. federal prosecutor's office

United States Attorney for the District of Texas is a defunct United States Attorney's office that served Texas from statehood until 1853. The U.S. Attorney for Texas was the chief law enforcement officer for the United States District Court for the District of Texas. The district was succeeded by the United States Attorney for the Western District of Texas and the United States Attorney for the Eastern District of Texas.

== List of office holders ==
- George W. Brown (1846–1848)
- Franklin H. Merriman (1848–1850)
- William Pitt Ballinger (1850–1853)
- Samuel D. Hay (1853)
