= United States District Court for the Northern District of Florida =

United States federal district court in Florida

Coordinates: 30.4133°N 87.2160°W

- (N.D. Fla.)
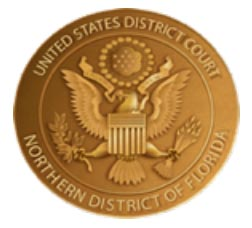
- Location: Joseph Hatchett U.S. Courthouse (Tallahassee) More locations: Gainesville; Panama City; Winston E. Arnow Federal Building (Pensacola); Marianna
- Appeals to: Eleventh Circuit
- Established: February 23, 1847
- Judges: 4
- Chief Judge: Allen Winsor

Officers of the court
- U.S. Attorney: John Heekin
- U.S. Marshal: R. Don Ladner Jr.
- www.flnd.uscourts.gov

The United States District Court for the Northern District of Florida (in case citations, N.D. Fla.) is a federal court in the Eleventh Circuit (except for patent claims and claims against the U.S. government under the Tucker Act, which are appealed to the Federal Circuit).

The district was established on February 23, 1847, with the division of the state into a Northern and Southern district.

The United States attorney for the district is John Heekin. He was nominated as U.S. attorney by President Donald J. Trump on May 6, 2025, and was appointed by Attorney General Pam Bondi as the interim U.S. attorney on June 2, 2025. His nomination was confirmed by the U.S. Senate on October 7, 2025, and he was commissioned by President Donald J. Trump the following day.

== Organization of the court ==
The United States District Court for the Northern District of Florida is one of three federal judicial districts in Florida. Court for the district is held at Gainesville, Panama City, Pensacola, and Tallahassee. The court serves approximately 1.75 million people.

Gainesville Division comprises the following counties: Alachua, Dixie, Gilchrist, Lafayette, and Levy.

Panama City Division comprises the following counties: Bay, Calhoun, Gulf, Holmes, Jackson, and Washington.

Pensacola Division comprises the following counties: Escambia, Okaloosa, Santa Rosa, and Walton.

Tallahassee Division comprises the following counties: Franklin, Gadsden, Jefferson, Leon, Liberty, Madison, Taylor, and Wakulla.

== Current judges ==
As of July 14, 2025:

#	Title	Judge	Duty station	Born	Term of service			Appointed by
#	Title	Judge	Duty station	Born	Active	Chief	Senior	Appointed by
25	Chief Judge	Allen Winsor	Tallahassee	1976	2019–present	2025–present	—	Trump
22	District Judge	M. Casey Rodgers	Pensacola	1964	2003–present	2011–2018	—	G.W. Bush
24	District Judge	Mark E. Walker	Tallahassee	1967	2012–present	2018–2025	—	Obama
26	District Judge	T. Kent Wetherell II	Pensacola	1970	2019–present	—	—	Trump
19	Senior Judge	Lacey A. Collier	Pensacola	1935	1991–2003	—	2003–present	G.H.W. Bush
20	Senior Judge	Robert Hinkle	Tallahassee	1951	1996–2016	2004–2009	2016–present	Clinton

== Former judges ==
#	Judge	Born–died	Active service	Chief Judge	Senior status	Appointed by	Reason for termination
1	Isaac H. Bronson	1802–1855	1847–1855 (Note: Reassigned from the District of Florida.)	—	—	Polk/Operation of law	death
2	McQueen McIntosh	1822–1868	1856–1861	—	—	Pierce	resignation
3	Philip Fraser	1814–1876	1862–1876	—	—	Lincoln	death
4	Thomas Settle	1831–1888	1877–1888	—	—	Grant	death
5	Charles Swayne	1842–1907	1889–1907 (Note: Recess appointment; formally nominated on December 5, 1889, confirmed by the United States Senate on April 1, 1890, and received commission the same day.)	—	—	B. Harrison	death
6	William Bostwick Sheppard	1860–1934	1907–1934 (Note: Recess appointment; formally nominated on December 3, 1907, confirmed by the Senate on May 20, 1908, and received commission the same day.)	—	—	T. Roosevelt	death
7	Augustus V. Long	1877–1955	1934–1947	—	1947–1955	F. Roosevelt	death
8	Curtis L. Waller	1887–1950	1940–1943 (Note: Jointly appointed to the Northern and Southern Districts of Florida.)	—	—	F. Roosevelt	elevation
9	Dozier A. DeVane	1883–1963	1943–1958 (Note: From 1943–1947, Judge DeVane was jointly appointed to the Northern and Southern Districts of Florida.)	—	1958–1963	F. Roosevelt	death
10	George William Whitehurst	1891–1974	1950–1961	—	1961–1974	Truman	death
11	G. Harrold Carswell	1919–1992	1958–1969	1958–1969	—	Eisenhower	elevation
12	George C. Young	1916–2015	1961–1966 (Note: From 1961–1962, Judge Young was jointly appointed to the Northern and Southern Districts of Florida. From 1962–1966, Judge Young was jointly appointed to the Middle, Northern, and Southern Districts of Florida.)	—	—	Kennedy	reassignment
13	Winston Arnow	1911–1994	1967–1981	1969–1981	1981–1994	L. Johnson	death
14	David Middlebrooks Jr.	1926–1997	1969–1974	—	—	Nixon	resignation
15	William Henry Stafford Jr.	1931–2025	1975–1996	1981–1993	1996–2025	Ford	death
16	Lynn Carlton Higby	1938–1992	1979–1983	—	—	Carter	resignation
17	Maurice M. Paul	1932–2016	1982–1997	1993–1997	1997–2016	Reagan	death
18	Roger Vinson	1940–2023	1983–2005	1997–2004	2005–2023	Reagan	death
21	Stephan P. Mickle	1944–2021	1998–2011	2009–2011	2011–2021	Clinton	death
23	John Richard Smoak Jr.	1943–2022	2005–2015	–	2015–2022	G.W. Bush	death

== Chief judges ==
Chief judges have administrative responsibilities with respect to their district court. Unlike the Supreme Court, where one justice is specifically nominated to be chief, the office of chief judge rotates among the district court judges. To be chief, a judge must have been in active service on the court for at least one year, be under the age of 65, and have not previously served as chief judge.

A vacancy is filled by the judge highest in seniority among the group of qualified judges. The chief judge serves for a term of seven years, or until age 70, whichever occurs first. The age restrictions are waived if no members of the court would otherwise be qualified for the position.

When the office was created in 1948, the chief judge was the longest-serving judge who had not elected to retire, on what has since 1958 been known as senior status, or declined to serve as chief judge. After August 6, 1959, judges could not become or remain chief after turning 70 years old. The current rules have been in operation since October 1, 1982.

== Succession of seats ==
Seat 1
Seat reassigned from the District of Florida on February 23, 1847 by 9 Stat. 131
Bronson	1847–1855
McIntosh	1856–1861
Fraser	1862–1876
Settle	1877–1888
Swayne	1889–1907
Sheppard	1907–1934
Long	1934–1947
Seat abolished on October 1, 1947 pursuant to 54 Stat. 219

Seat 2
Seat established on May 24, 1940 by 54 Stat. 219 (temporary, concurrent with Southern District)
Waller	1940–1943
Seat reassigned solely to Northern District and made permanent on October 1, 1947 pursuant to 54 Stat. 219
DeVane	1943–1958
Carswell	1958–1969
Middlebrooks, Jr.	1969–1974
Stafford, Jr.	1975–1996
Hinkle	1996–2016
Winsor	2019–present

Seat 3
Seat established on August 3, 1949 by 63 Stat. 493 (concurrent with Southern District)
Whitehurst	1950–1961
Seat assigned concurrently to the Middle District on July 30, 1962 pursuant to 76 Stat. 247
Young	1961–1966
Seat reassigned solely to the Middle District on September 17, 1966 pursuant to 80 Stat. 75

Seat 4
Seat established on March 18, 1966 by 80 Stat. 75
Arnow	1967–1981
Paul	1982–1997
Mickle	1998–2011
Walker	2012–present

Seat 5
Seat established on October 20, 1978 by 92 Stat. 1629
Higby	1979–1983
Vinson	1983–2005
Smoak, Jr.	2005–2015
Wetherell II	2019–present

Seat 6
Seat established on December 1, 1990 by 104 Stat. 5089
Collier	1991–2003
Rodgers	2003–present

== U.S. attorneys ==
- George W. Call, Jr. 1850–53
- Chandler C. Yonge 1853–63
- Culver P. Chamberlin 1863–69
- Horatio Bisbee Jr. 1869–73
- J. B. C. Drew 1873–76
- John B. Stickney 1876–82
- Edward M. Cheney 1882–87
- Rhydon Mays Call 1887–89
- Joseph N. Stripling 1889–93
- Owen J. H. Summers 1893–94
- J. Emmett Wolfe 1894–98
- John Eagan 1898–1903
- William B. Sheppard 1903–07
- Emmett Wilson 1907–09
- Fred Cubberly 1909–13
- Edward C. Love 1913–15
- John L. Neeley 1915
- Phillip D. Beale 1915
- John L. Neeley 1915–21
- Fred Cubberly 1921–32
- George P. Wentworth 1932–33
- George E. Hoffmann 1933–53
- George H. Carswell 1953–58
- Wilfred C. Varn 1958–61
- Charles W. Eggart, Jr. 1961
- Clinton N. Ashmore 1961–69
- William Henry Stafford Jr. 1969–75
- Clinton N. Ashmore 1975–76
- Nicholas P. Geeker 1976–82
- K. Michael Moore 1982–83
- Thomas Dillard III 1983–87
- K. Michael Moore 1987–89
- Lyndia F. Padgett 1989–90
- Kenneth W. Sukhia 1990–93
- Gregory R. Miller 1993
- Patrick M. Patterson 1993–98
- Thomas F Kirwin 1998?–2002
- Gregory R. Miller 2002–2008
- Thomas F Kirwin 2008–2010
- Pamela Cothran Marsh 2010–2015
- Christopher Canova 2015–2019
- Larry Keefe 2019–2021
- Jason R. Coody 2021–2025
- John Heekin 2025-present

== See also ==
- Courts of Florida
- List of current United States district judges
- List of United States federal courthouses in Florida
- United States Court of Appeals for the Eleventh Circuit
- United States District Court for the Middle District of Florida
- United States District Court for the Southern District of Florida
- United States attorneys for federal judicial districts of Florida Territory
