= Larry Keefe =

American attorney (born 1961)

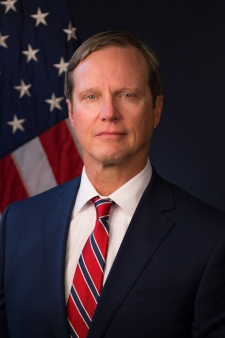

United States Attorney for the Northern District of Florida
- In office January 9, 2019 – February 28, 2021
- President: Donald Trump; Joe Biden
- Preceded by: Christopher Canova (acting)
- Succeeded by: Jason Coody (acting)

Personal details
- Born: Lawrence A. Keefe; December 30, 1961 (age 64) Fort Dix, New Jersey, U.S.
- Education: University of Florida (BA, JD)

Lawrence A. "Larry" Keefe (born December 30, 1961) is an American attorney serving as Florida's Public Safety Czar. He is a former United States Attorney for the Northern District of Florida from 2019 to 2021.

== Early life and education ==
Keefe was born on December 30, 1961, in Fort Dix, New Jersey. He graduated with honors from the University of Florida in 1983 and received his Juris Doctor from the Fredric G. Levin College of Law in 1986.

== Legal career ==
Keefe worked as a trial lawyer for more than 30 years, during which time he tried criminal and civil cases in federal and state courts. Before taking office as U.S. Attorney, he was a partner in the Fort Walton Beach, Florida-based law firm of Keefe, Anchors & Gordon. He has served on the board of trustees of the Fredric G. Levin College of Law, on the editorial board of the Florida Bar Journal, on the executive council of the trial lawyers section of the Florida Bar, and as Special Counsel to the Florida Senate Select Committee on Property Insurance Accountability.

== Memberships ==
Keefe is the chairperson of the Military Academy Selection Board for the First Congressional District of Florida and a past president of Catholic Charities of Northwest Florida.

== United States Attorney ==
On August 16, 2018, President Donald Trump nominated Keefe to be the United States Attorney for the Northern District of Florida. Keefe's nomination was sent to the United States Senate on August 27.

The Senate confirmed Keefe's nomination by voice vote on January 2, 2019. Keefe was sworn in as U.S. Attorney on January 9, 2019.

On February 8, 2021, he along with 55 other Trump-era attorneys were asked to resign. He resigned on February 28, 2021.

== Florida "public safety czar" ==
On September 28, 2021, Florida Governor Ron DeSantis appointed Keefe as Florida's "public safety czar."
