= Roger Vinson =

American judge (1940–2023)

Senior Judge of the United States District Court for the Northern District of Florida
- In office March 31, 2005 – April 1, 2023

Chief Judge of the United States District Court for the Northern District of Florida
- In office 1997–2004
- Preceded by: Maurice M. Paul
- Succeeded by: Robert Lewis Hinkle

Judge of the United States District Court for the Northern District of Florida
- In office October 5, 1983 – March 31, 2005
- Appointed by: Ronald Reagan
- Preceded by: Lynn Carlton Higby
- Succeeded by: John Richard Smoak Jr.

Personal details
- Born: Clyde Roger Vinson; February 19, 1940 Cadiz, Kentucky, U.S.
- Died: April 1, 2023 (aged 83)
- Education: United States Naval Academy (B.S.); Vanderbilt University Law School (J.D.)

Clyde Roger Vinson (February 19, 1940 – April 1, 2023) was a United States district judge of the United States District Court for the Northern District of Florida. Until May 3, 2013, he was also a member of the United States Foreign Intelligence Surveillance Court.

== Education and career ==
Born in Cadiz, Kentucky, Vinson attended the United States Naval Academy and graduated in 1962 with a Bachelor of Science in engineering. He served at Naval Air Station Pensacola as a naval aviator from 1962 to 1968, attaining the rank of lieutenant. After his service, he attended Vanderbilt University Law School and received his Juris Doctor in 1971. Returning to Pensacola, Florida, Vinson joined the law firm of Beggs & Lane, where he practiced general civil law from 1971 to 1983.

=== Federal judicial service ===
Vinson was nominated by President Ronald Reagan on September 9, 1983, to a seat on the United States District Court for the Northern District of Florida vacated by Judge Lynn Carlton Higby. He was confirmed by the United States Senate on October 4, 1983, and received his commission on October 5, 1983. He served as chief judge from 1997 to 2004. He assumed senior status on March 31, 2005.

Vinson was appointed to serve a seven-year term on the United States Foreign Intelligence Surveillance Court, effective May 4, 2006. As a member of the FISA court, Vinson issued a top secret court order on April 25, 2013, requiring Verizon's Business Network Services to provide metadata on all calls in its system to the National Security Agency "on an ongoing daily basis".

== Notable cases ==
- Four defendants of abortion clinic bombing, 1985
- Escambia County, Florida ordinance banning The Last Temptation of Christ, 1988
- Shoney's $134 million race discrimination settlement, 1993
- Paul Jennings Hill (federal Clinic Access Law charges), 1994
- Sentenced Financial Manager Marcus Schrenker, who attempted to fake his own death by parachuting out of his plane after charges were brought against him for securities fraud, to four years in federal prison in 2009.

In 2010, Vinson was assigned to hear a case, Florida et al v. United States Department of Health and Human Services, brought by a group of 26 states that was filed with support by 22 attorneys general and four governors challenging the constitutionality of the new Patient Protection and Affordable Care Act (PPACA), specifically its requirement that most individuals obtain medical insurance. The suit is the second of more than 15 lawsuits filed against the act that has advanced to this stage of litigation.

On January 31, 2011, Vinson ruled that the individual mandate provision of the PPACA violated the Constitution by regulating economic inactivity, and as the mandate is not severable the entire statute was ruled unconstitutional. Vinson allowed the law to stand while it was being appealed by the Obama administration. Vinson later issued a stay to his January ruling, allowing implementation to proceed while its constitutionality was weighed.

== Sentencing philosophy ==
Vinson is noted for being a hardline judge who refused to depart from maximum sentences in spite of their severity, even though he agreed his very own sentences were far too high. In his own words: "The punishment is supposed to fit the crime, but when a legislative body says this is going to be the sentence no matter what other factors there are, that's draconian in every sense of the word. Mandatory sentences breed injustice."

== Personal life and death ==
In 2009, Vinson was installed as president of the American Camellia Society.

Vinson died from prostate cancer on April 1, 2023, aged 83.

Legal offices
Preceded by Lynn Carlton Higby	Judge of the United States District Court for the Northern District of Florida; 1983–2005	Succeeded by John Richard Smoak Jr.
Preceded by Maurice M. Paul	Chief Judge of the United States District Court for the Northern District of Florida; 1997–2004	Succeeded by Robert Lewis Hinkle
