= United States Attorney for the District of North Carolina =

Defunct U.S. federal prosecutor's office

United States Attorney for the District of North Carolina is a defunct United States Attorney's office that served North Carolina until 1853. The U.S. Attorney for Wisconsin was the chief law enforcement officer for the United States District Court for the District of North Carolina. The district was succeeded by the United States Attorney for the Western District of North Carolina and the United States Attorney for the Eastern District of North Carolina.

== Office holders ==
- John Sitgreaves (1790)
- William Hill (1790-1795)
- Benjamin Wood (1795-1808)
- Robert H. Jones (1808-1816)
- Thomas P. Devereux (1816-1817)
- James McKay (1817-1821)
- Thomas P. Devereux (1821-1839)
- H. L. Holmes (1839-1840)
- James B. Sheppard (1840)
- William H. Haywood (1840-1843)
- Duncan K. McRae (1843-1850)
- Hiram W. Husted (1850-1853)
- Robert P. Dick (1853)
