= Allen Winsor =

American judge (born 1976)

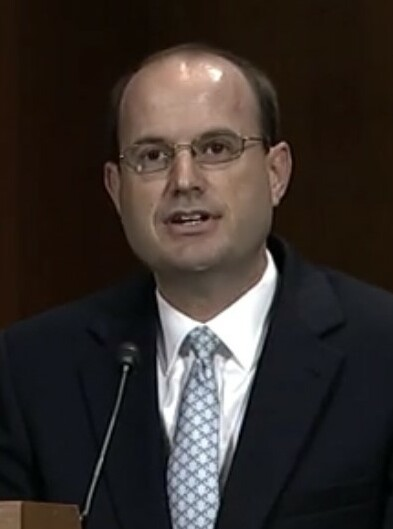

Chief Judge of the United States District Court for the Northern District of Florida
- Incumbent
- Assumed office June 23, 2025
- Preceded by: Mark E. Walker

Judge of the United States District Court for the Northern District of Florida
- Incumbent
- Assumed office June 21, 2019
- Appointed by: Donald Trump
- Preceded by: Robert Hinkle

Judge of the Florida First District Court of Appeal
- In office February 5, 2016 – June 21, 2019
- Appointed by: Rick Scott
- Preceded by: Robert Benton
- Succeeded by: Rachel Nordby

Solicitor General of Florida
- In office June 7, 2013 – February 5, 2016
- Governor: Rick Scott
- Preceded by: Timothy Osterhaus
- Succeeded by: Amit Agarwal

Personal details
- Born: Allen Cothrel Winsor; 1976 (age 49–50) Orlando, Florida, U.S.
- Party: Republican
- Education: Auburn University (BS); University of Florida (JD)

Allen Cothrel Winsor (born 1976) is the chief United States district judge of the United States District Court for the Northern District of Florida.

== Biography ==
Winsor received a Bachelor of Science in Business Administration from Auburn University and a Juris Doctor from the Fredric G. Levin College of Law where he was inducted into the Order of the Coif and served as editor-in-chief of the Florida Law Review.

After law school, Winsor served as a law clerk to Judge Edward Earl Carnes of the United States Court of Appeals for the Eleventh Circuit. From 2003 to 2005, he was an associate at King & Spalding. He later was a partner in the Tallahassee office of Gray Robinson, where he focused on civil and appellate litigation.

He then joined the Florida Attorney General's office and served for three years as Solicitor General of Florida, under A.G. Pam Bondi. In that position, he defended Florida's voter-approved ban on same-sex marriages that was eventually struck down, contending in a legal brief for Florida that recognizing same-sex marriages from other states would ostensibly "impose significant public harm" and that Florida possessed a legitimate interest in restricting marriage as exclusively between men and women.

In 2016, Governor Rick Scott appointed him to the Florida First District Court of Appeal, where he served until being appointed to the federal district court by President Donald Trump.

Ashley Schapitl, a spokeswoman for California Democratic Senator Dianne Feinstein, said Feinstein voted in opposition to Winsor's confirmation because of his role "defending laws that would restrict women's reproductive rights and the prohibition of same-sex marriage." She further mentioned that Winsor assisted Florida in joining an action contesting power plant emissions rules written by the Obama administration.

=== Federal judicial service ===
On April 10, 2018, President Donald Trump nominated Winsor to serve as a United States District Judge of the United States District Court for the Northern District of Florida. He was nominated to the seat vacated by Judge Robert Hinkle, who assumed senior status on November 7, 2016. On May 23, 2018, a hearing on his nomination was held before the Senate Judiciary Committee. On June 14, 2018, his nomination was reported out of committee by an 11–10 vote. Democratic Senator Bill Nelson of Florida supported his nomination.

On January 3, 2019, his nomination was returned to the President under Rule XXXI, Paragraph 6 of the United States Senate. On January 23, 2019, Trump announced his intent to renominate Winsor for a federal judgeship. His nomination was sent to the Senate later that day. On February 7, 2019, his nomination was reported out of committee by a 12–10 vote. On June 18, 2019, the Senate invoked cloture on his nomination by a 54–42 vote. On June 19, 2019, he was confirmed by a 54–44 vote, with Democrat Joe Manchin voting for him. He received his judicial commission on June 21, 2019. He became chief judge in June 2025.

== Memberships ==
He has been a member of the Federalist Society since 2005.

Legal offices
Preceded by Robert Hinkle	Judge of the United States District Court for the Northern District of Florida; 2019–present	Incumbent
Preceded by Mark E. Walker	Chief Judge of the United States District Court for the Northern District of Florida; 2025–present	Incumbent
