= Guyencourt, Delaware =

Unincorporated community in Delaware, United States

- Unincorporated community
- Location within Delaware Location within the United States
- Coordinates: 39°48′49″N 75°35′11″W
- Country: United States
- State: Delaware
- County: New Castle
- Elevation: 249 ft (76 m)
- Time zone: UTC-5 (Eastern (EST))
  - Summer (DST): UTC-4 (EDT)
- Area code: 302
- GNIS feature ID: 214048

Guyencourt is an unincorporated community in New Castle County, Delaware, United States. Guyencourt is located at the intersection of Delaware Route 100 and Guyencourt Road, north of Wilmington and south of the Pennsylvania border.

== Notable person ==
- Charles Swayne, United States District Court judge, was born in Guyencourt.
