= Philip Fraser =

American judge

Judge of the United States District Court for the Northern District of Florida
- In office July 17, 1862 – July 26, 1876
- Appointed by: Abraham Lincoln
- Preceded by: McQueen McIntosh
- Succeeded by: Thomas Settle

Personal details
- Born: Philip Fraser; January 27, 1814 Montrose, Pennsylvania
- Died: July 26, 1876 (aged 62) Montrose, Pennsylvania

Philip Fraser (January 27, 1814 – July 26, 1876) was a United States district judge of the United States District Court for the Northern District of Florida.

== Education and career ==
Born in Montrose, Pennsylvania, Fraser was an attorney in private practice in Jacksonville, Florida, and was Mayor of Jacksonville from 1855 to 1856.

== Federal judicial service ==
On June 14, 1862, Fraser was nominated by President Abraham Lincoln to a seat on the United States District Court for the Northern District of Florida vacated by Judge McQueen McIntosh. Fraser was confirmed by the United States Senate on July 17, 1862, and received his commission the same day. Fraser served in that capacity until his death on July 26, 1876, in Montrose, Pennsylvania.

== Sources ==
Legal offices
| Preceded by McQueen McIntosh | Judge of the United States District Court for the Northern District of Florida; 1862–1876 | Succeeded by Thomas Settle |
