= United States attorneys for federal judicial districts of Florida Territory =

Federal prosecutors

This is a list of United States attorneys for federal judicial districts of Florida Territory. The eastern and western districts were divided in 1822 at the Suwannee River.

The courts were reorganized into the United States District Court for the Northern District of Florida in 1846 and the United States District Court for the Southern District of Florida in 1847. The United States District Court for the Middle District of Florida was reestablished in 1962.

== United States attorney for the Western District of Florida ==
- Alexander Anderson (1821–1822)
- Tipton B. Harrison (1822)
- William F. Steele (1823–1825)
- Benjamin D. Wright (1825)
- Albert I. Clagett (1825)
- Benjamin D. Wright (1825–1831)
- John K. Campbell (1831)
- George Walker (1831–1838)
- William H. Brockenborough (1838–1840)
- James T. Archer (1840)
- Walker Anderson (1841–1842
- George S. Hawkins (1842–1845)
- Chandler C. Yonge (1845)

== United States attorney for the Eastern District of Florida ==
- John G. Bird (1821–1822)
- Alexander Hamilton Jr. (1822–1823)
- Edgar Macon (1823–1826)
- Thomas Douglas (1826–1842)

== United States attorney for the Middle District of Florida (former) ==
- Adam Gordon (1825–1827)
- William Allison McRea (1827–1828)
- Jones G. Ringgold (1828–1831)
- James A. Dunlap (1831)
- John K. Campbell (1831–1833)
- George K. Walker (1833–1837)
- Charles S. Sibley (1837–1845)
