= Lacey A. Collier =

American judge (born 1935)

Lacey Alexander Collier

Senior Judge of the United States District Court for the Northern District of Florida
- Incumbent
- Assumed office November 20, 2003

Judge of the United States District Court for the Northern District of Florida
- In office November 18, 1991 – November 20, 2003
- Appointed by: George H. W. Bush
- Preceded by: Seat established by 104 Stat. 5089
- Succeeded by: M. Casey Rodgers

Personal details
- Born: Lacey Alexander Collier; June 23, 1935 (age 91) Demopolis, Alabama, U.S.
- Education: Naval Postgraduate School (BA); University of West Florida (MA); Florida State University (JD)

Military service
- Branch/service: United States Navy
- Years of service: 1955–1975

Lacey Alexander Collier (born June 23, 1935) is an American attorney serving as a senior United States district judge of the United States District Court for the Northern District of Florida.

== Early life and education ==
Collier was born in Demopolis, Alabama. He entered the United States Navy at age 20, serving from 1955 to 1975. He graduated with his Bachelor of Arts degree from the Naval Postgraduate School of the United States Naval Academy in 1970 and received a Master of Arts from the University of West Florida in 1972. After leaving the navy, Collier received a Bachelor of Arts degree from the University of West Florida in 1975, and his Juris Doctor from the Florida State University College of Law in 1977.

== Career ==
After graduating from law school he served as an assistant state attorney for the First Judicial District from 1977 to 1984. He served as a circuit judge on the First Judicial District from 1984 to 1991.

=== Federal judicial service ===
President George H. W. Bush nominated Collier to the United States District Court for the Northern District of Florida on July 24, 1991, to a new seat created by 104 Stat. 5089. He was confirmed by the Senate on November 15, 1991, he received his commission three days later. Collier assumed senior status on November 20, 2003.

== Sources ==
Legal offices
Preceded by Seat established by 104 Stat. 5089	Judge of the United States District Court for the Northern District of Florida; 1991–2003	Succeeded by M. Casey Rodgers
