= United States Customs House and Post Office (Pensacola, Florida) =

- U.S. Customs House and Post Office
- U.S. National Register of Historic Places
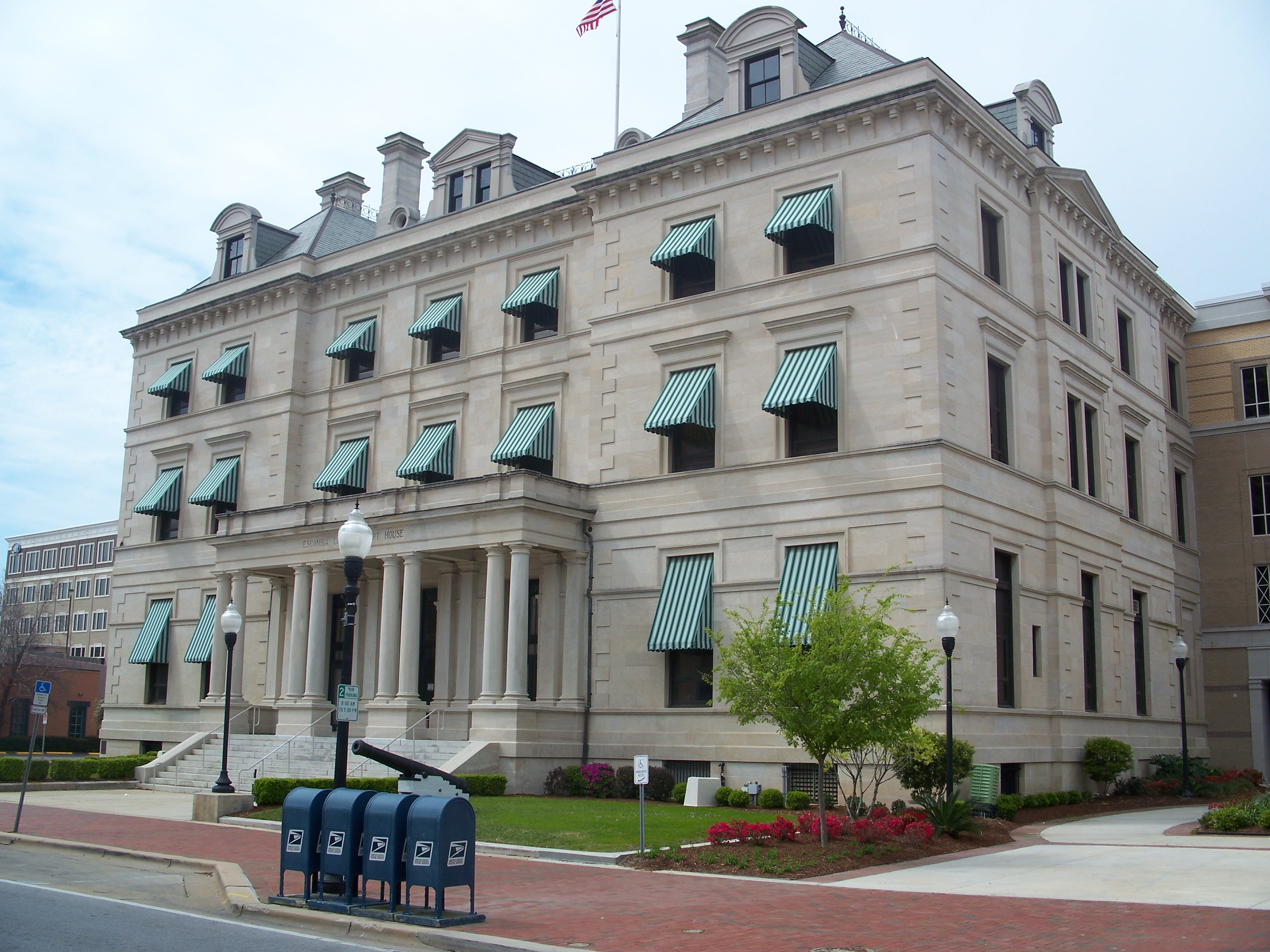
- Escambia County Courthouse

- Location within Florida Location within the United States
- Location: 223 Palafox Pl., Pensacola, Florida
- Coordinates: 30°24′34″N 87°12′54″W
- Area: less than one acre
- Architect: Bell, M.E.
- Architectural style: Renaissance Revival
- NRHP reference No.: 97000659
- Added to NRHP: July 22, 1997

The U.S. Customs House and Post Office, also known as the Escambia County Courthouse, is a historic site in Pensacola, Florida. Built in 1887, it is located at 223 Palafox Place. On July 22, 1997, it was added to the U.S. National Register of Historic Places.

== History ==
From 1885 to 1937, the Escambia County Courthouse was a building on the northeast corner of Palafox and Chase streets. It was built for $200,000. The U.S. Customs House and Post Office housed the customs house on the second floor, the post office on the first floor, the district attorney’s office, and the courts on the third and fourth floors. It also housed the internal revenue collector's office and the office of the surgeon in charge of the Pensacola marina hospital.

In 1937 Escambia County, which needed more space, swapped its location for that of the U.S. Customs House and Post Office because the Federal Government, which by then had no more use for a customs house, needed a building site for a new U.S. Post Office and Courthouse. The Federal Government demolished the old county courthouse in 1938 and built its new building there.

Escambia County moved into the old customs house and post office in 1940, housing the county and clerks offices. Plans were announced in 2008 to renovate the upper floors for the Arts Council of Northwest Florida and West Florida Historic Preservation.

== Architecture ==
The U.S. Customs House and Post Office was designed by architect M. E. Bell. The late Victorian Renaissance Revival style four-story building has a limestone exterior, over brick walls. Its main entrance has a colonnaded portico with a flat roof. A four-story annex addition was added in 1953.

== Gallery ==
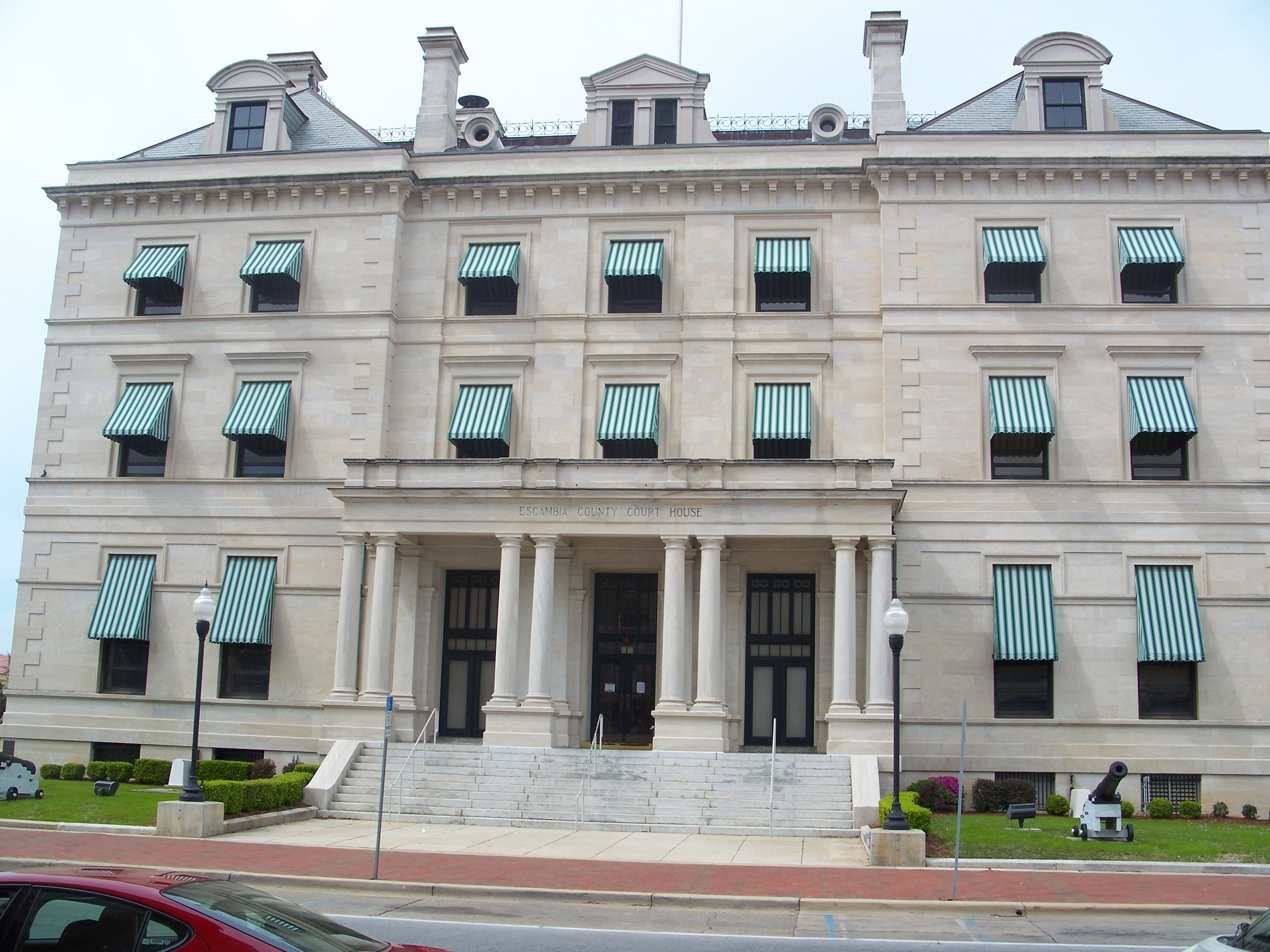

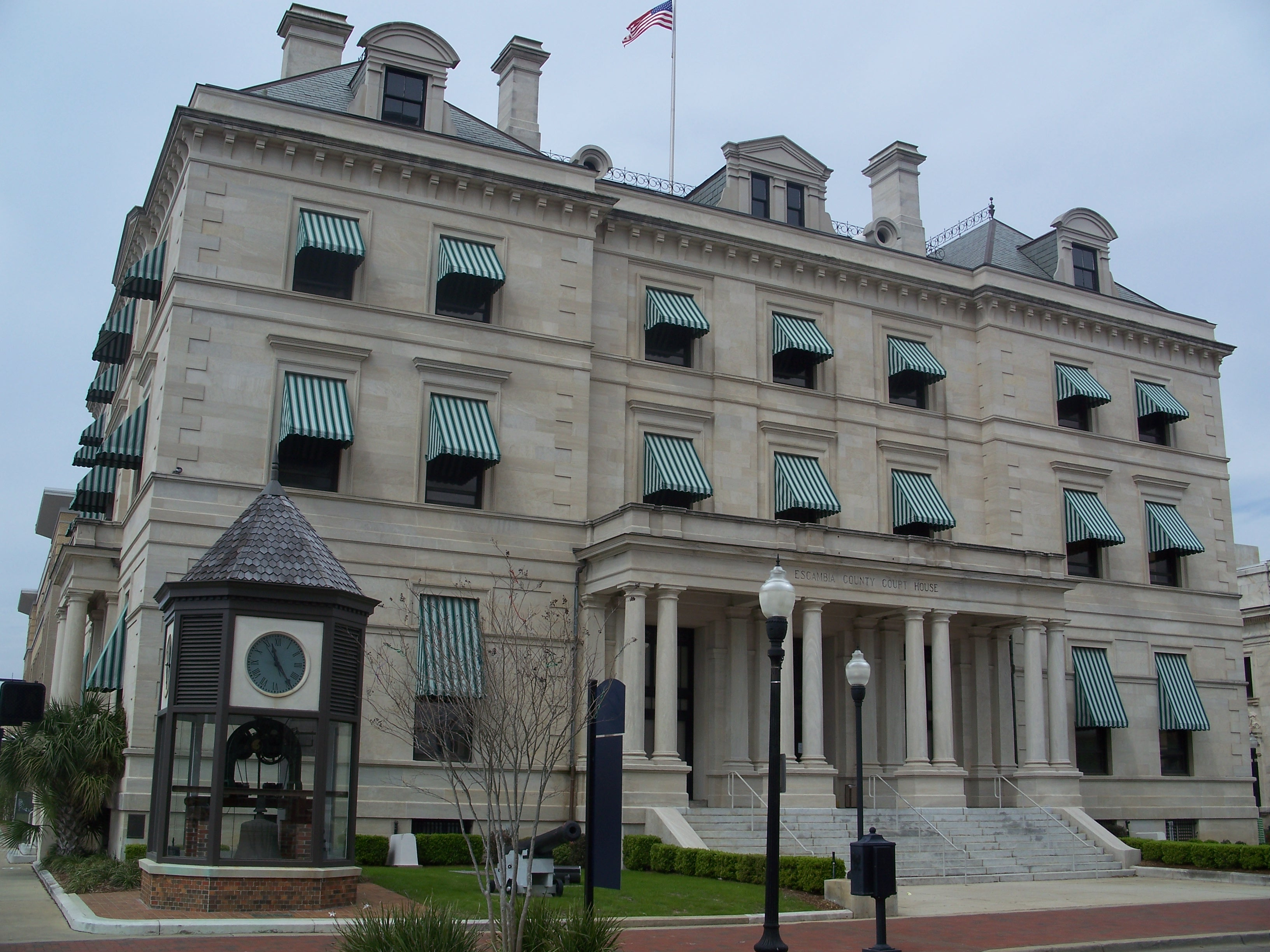

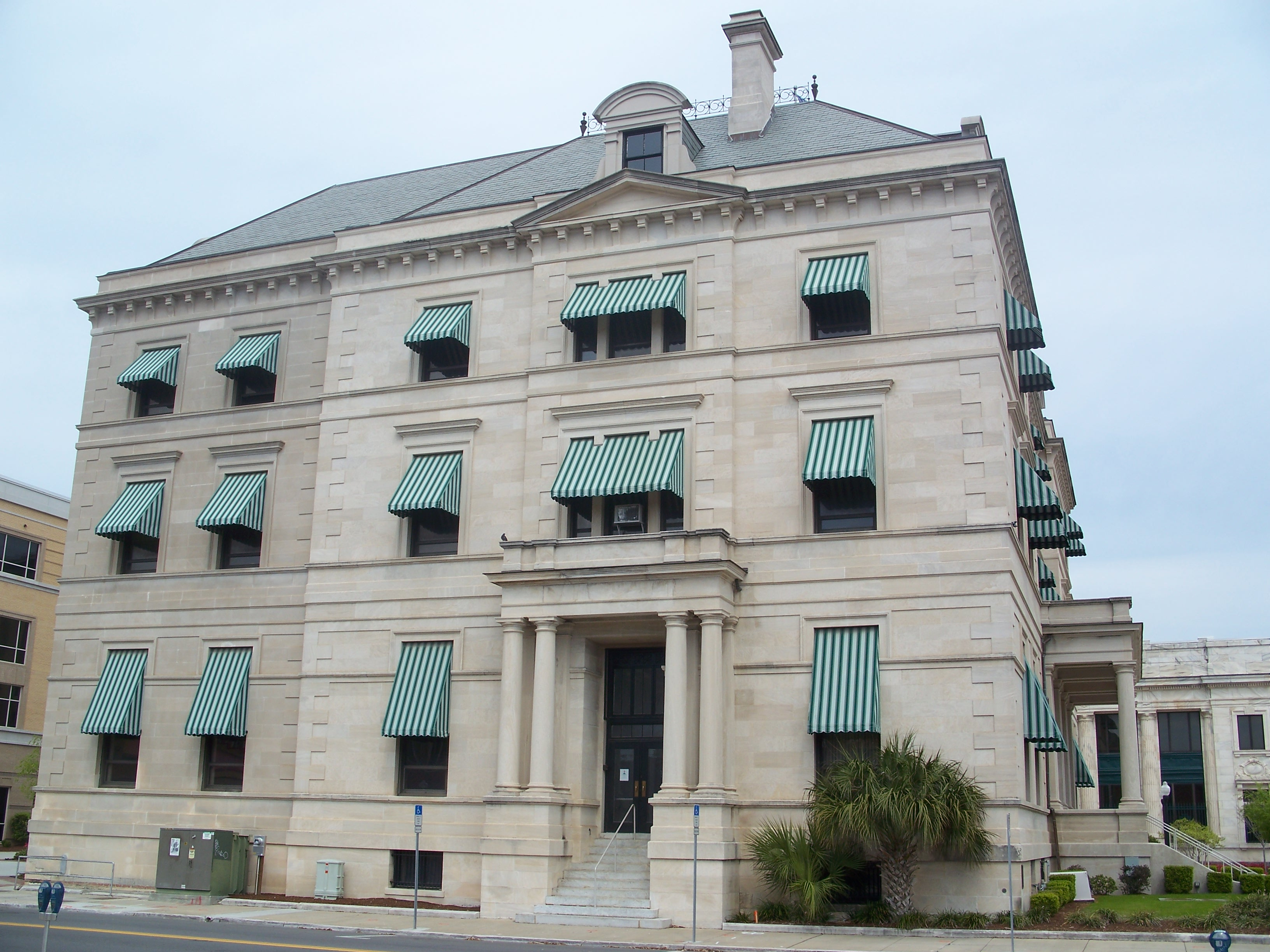

== See also ==
- List of United States post offices
