= M. Casey Rodgers =

American judge (born 1964)

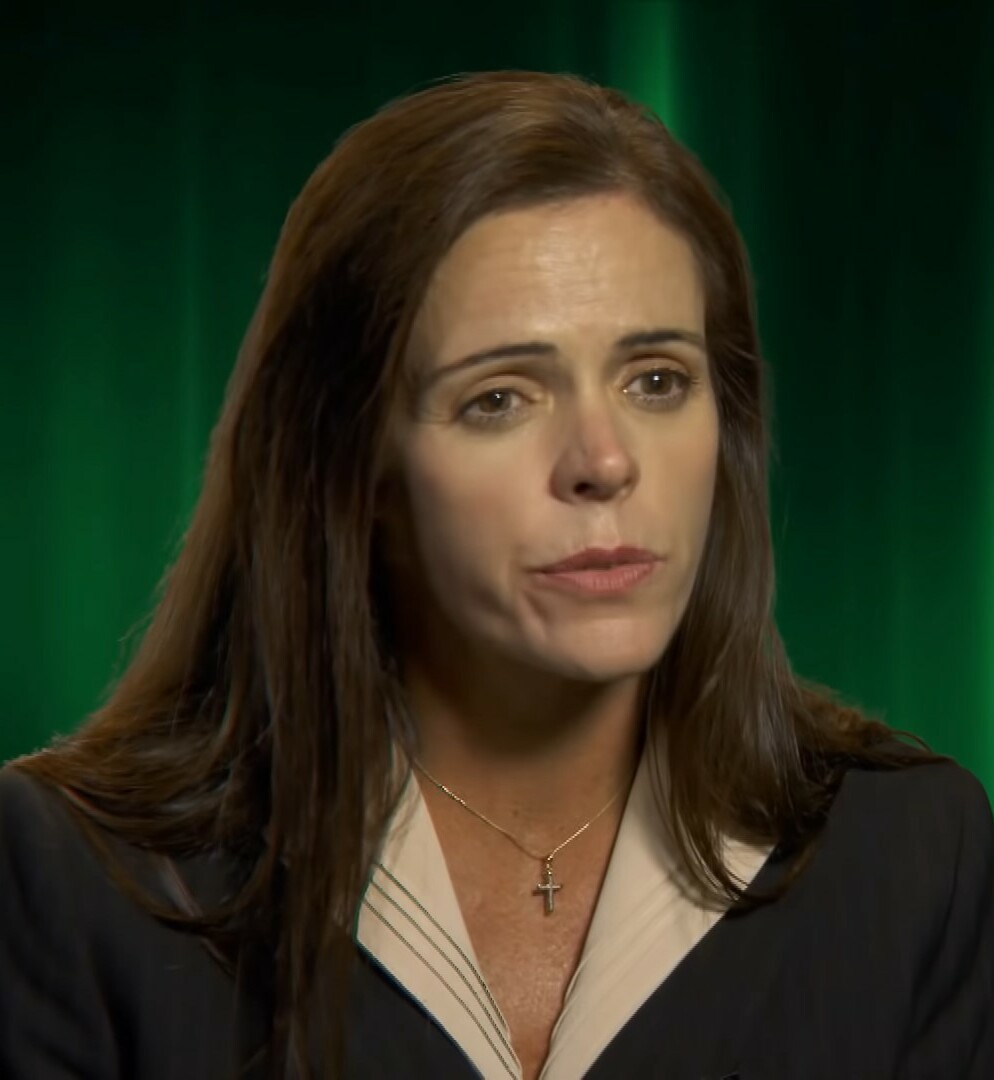
- Rodgers in 2013

Chief Judge of the United States District Court for the Northern District of Florida
- In office 2011 – June 23, 2018
- Preceded by: Stephan P. Mickle
- Succeeded by: Mark E. Walker

Judge of the United States District Court for the Northern District of Florida
- Incumbent
- Assumed office November 21, 2003
- Appointed by: George W. Bush
- Preceded by: Lacey A. Collier

Magistrate Judge of the United States District Court for the Northern District of Florida
- In office 2002–2003

Personal details
- Born: 1964 (age 61–62) Pensacola, Florida, U.S.
- Education: University of West Florida (BA); California Western School of Law (JD)

Military service
- Allegiance: United States
- Branch/service: United States Army
- Years of service: 1985–1987

Margaret Catharine Rodgers (born 1964), known professionally as M. Casey Rodgers, is a United States district judge of the United States District Court for the Northern District of Florida.

== Education and career ==
Born in Pensacola, Florida, Rodgers was in the United States Army from 1985 to 1987, and thereafter received a Bachelor of Arts degree from the University of West Florida in 1989 and a Juris Doctor from California Western School of Law, an independent law school, in 1992. She was a law clerk for Judge Lacey A. Collier, U.S. District Court for the Northern District of Florida from 1992 to 1994. She was in private practice in Pensacola from 1999 to 2002, serving as general counsel to the West Florida Medical Center, in Pensacola from 1998 to 1999. She was a United States magistrate judge of the United States District Court for the Northern District of Florida, from 2002 to 2003.

== Federal judicial service ==
On July 14, 2003, Rodgers was nominated by President George W. Bush to a seat on the United States District Court for the Northern District of Florida vacated by Lacey A. Collier. Rodgers was confirmed by the United States Senate on October 20, 2003, and received her commission on November 21, 2003. She was the first woman appointed in the district's history. She served as Chief Judge from 2011 to 2018.

== Sources ==
Legal offices
Preceded by Lacey A. Collier	Judge of the United States District Court for the Northern District of Florida; 2003–present	Incumbent
Preceded by Stephan P. Mickle	Chief Judge of the United States District Court for the Northern District of Florida; 2011–2018	Succeeded by Mark E. Walker
