= David Lycurgus Middlebrooks Jr. =

American judge

Judge of the United States District Court for the Northern District of Florida
- In office December 11, 1969 – August 1, 1974
- Appointed by: Richard Nixon
- Preceded by: G. Harrold Carswell
- Succeeded by: William Henry Stafford Jr.

Personal details
- Born: David Lycurgus Middlebrooks Jr. June 27, 1926 Pensacola, Florida
- Died: March 26, 1997 (aged 70) Pensacola, Florida
- Education: Florida State University (B.S.); Fredric G. Levin College of Law (LL.B.)

David Lycurgus Middlebrooks Jr. (June 27, 1926 – March 26, 1997) was a United States district judge of the United States District Court for the Northern District of Florida.

== Education and career ==
Born on June 27, 1926, in Pensacola, Florida, Middlebrooks was in the United States Navy during World War II, from 1944 to 1946. He received a Bachelor of Science degree from Florida State University in 1950 and was then in the United States Air Force from 1950 to 1953. He received a Bachelor of Laws from the Fredric G. Levin College of Law at the University of Florida in 1956, and was in private practice in Pensacola from 1956 to 1970.

== Federal judicial service ==
On October 6, 1969, Middlebrooks was nominated by President Richard Nixon to a seat on the United States District Court for the Northern District of Florida vacated by Judge G. Harrold Carswell. He was confirmed by the United States Senate on December 10, 1969, and received his commission on December 11, 1969. Middlebrooks served until his resignation on August 1, 1974. He then returned to private practice in Pensacola. He died on March 26, 1997, in Pensacola.

== Sources ==
Legal offices
Preceded by G. Harrold Carswell	Judge of the United States District Court for the Northern District of Florida; 1969–1974	Succeeded by William Henry Stafford Jr.
