= Augustus V. Long =

American judge

Senior Judge of the United States District Court for the Northern District of Florida
- In office October 1, 1947 – May 20, 1955

Judge of the United States District Court for the Northern District of Florida
- In office June 4, 1934 – October 1, 1947
- Appointed by: Franklin D. Roosevelt
- Preceded by: William Bostwick Sheppard
- Succeeded by: Seat abolished

Personal details
- Born: Augustus V. Long; May 14, 1877 Lake City, Florida
- Died: May 20, 1955 (aged 78)
- Education: Florida Agricultural College read law

Augustus V. Long (May 14, 1877 – May 20, 1955) was a United States district judge of the United States District Court for the Northern District of Florida.

== Education and career ==
Born in Lake City, Florida, Long attended Florida Agricultural College (now the University of Florida), and read law to enter the bar in 1898. He was a United States Army Lieutenant during the Spanish–American War. He was in private practice in Starke, Florida from 1898 to 1910. He was a member of the Florida House of Representatives in 1903. He was a State's Attorney of Florida in 1907. He was State's Attorney for the Eighth Judicial Circuit of Florida from 1910 to 1921. He was a Judge of the Circuit Court of Appeals for the Eighth Judicial Circuit of Florida from 1921 to 1934.

== Federal judicial service ==
On May 26, 1934, Long was nominated by President Franklin D. Roosevelt to a seat on the United States District Court for the Northern District of Florida vacated by Judge William Bostwick Sheppard. Long was confirmed by the United States Senate on May 29, 1934, and received his commission on June 4, 1934. He assumed senior status on October 1, 1947. Long served in that capacity until his death on May 20, 1955.

== Sources ==
Legal offices
| Preceded by William Bostwick Sheppard | Judge of the United States District Court for the Northern District of Florida; 1934–1947 | Succeeded by Seat abolished |
