= Old Fort Pierce Post Office =

- Fort Pierce Old Post Office
- U.S. National Register of Historic Places
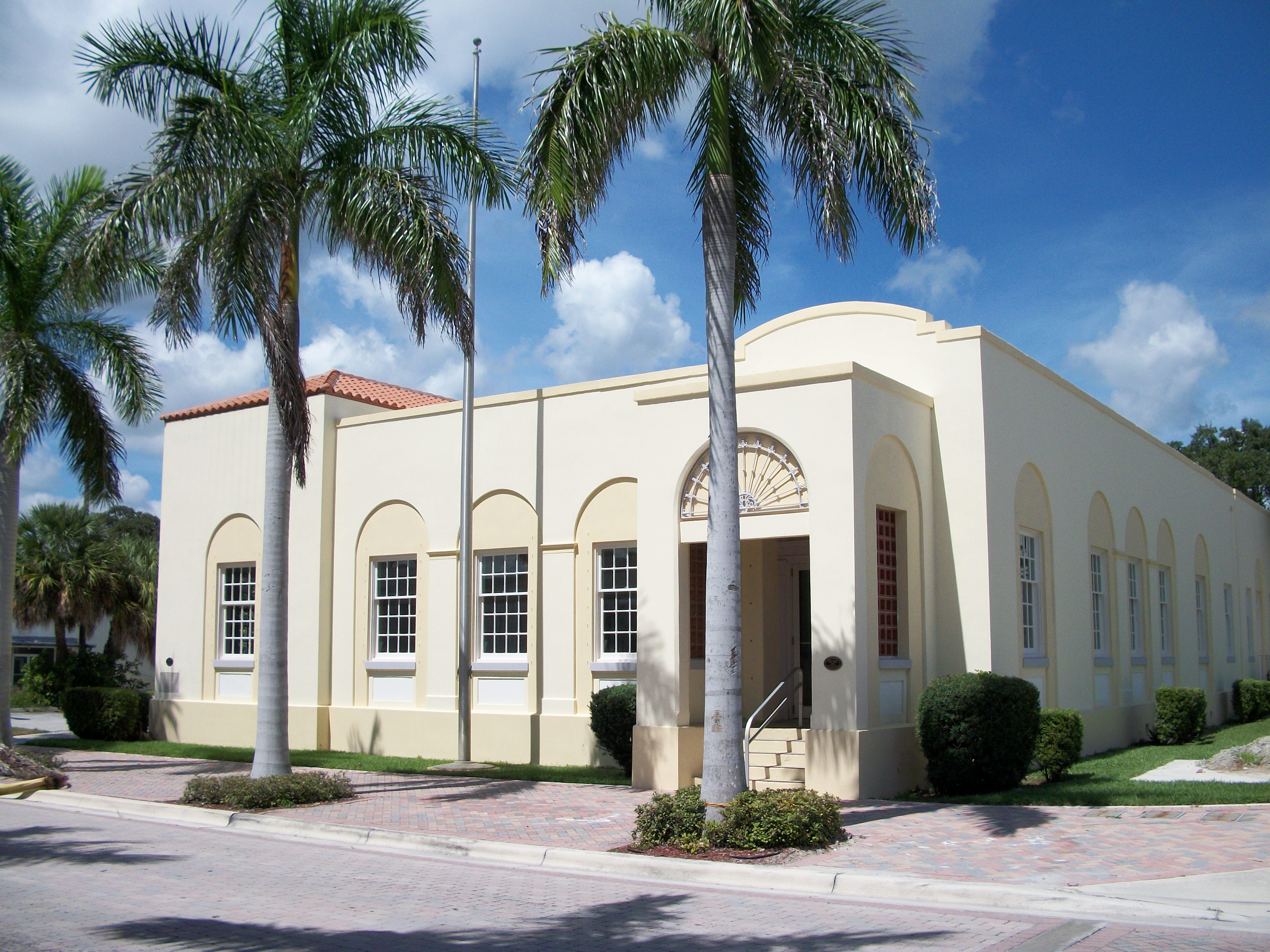

- Location within Florida Location within the United States
- Location: 500 Orange Avenue; Fort Pierce, Florida 34950
- Coordinates: 27°26′49″N 80°19′39″W
- Built: 1935
- Architect: Louis A. Simon
- Architectural style: Mediterranean Revival, Spanish Colonial Revival
- NRHP reference No.: 01000567
- Added to NRHP: February 11, 2002

The Old Fort Pierce Post Office is a historic building in Fort Pierce, Florida. It was built in 1935 by the Works Progress Administration and designed by architect Louis A. Simon in the Mediterranean Revival Style. As a civic structure it provided the city with a place for chance meetings and neighborly interaction. It is located at 500 Orange Avenue. On February 11, 2002, it was added to the U.S. National Register of Historic Places.

== See also ==
- List of United States post offices
