= Winston E. Arnow Federal Building =

- United States Post Office and Court House
- U.S. National Register of Historic Places

- Location within Florida Location within the United States
- Location: Pensacola, Florida
- Coordinates: 30°24′52″N 87°12′56″W
- NRHP reference No.: 14000389
- Added to NRHP: July 11, 2014

The Winston E. Arnow Federal Building is a national historic site located at 100 N. Palafox St., Pensacola, Florida in Escambia County. Originally built as a courthouse and post office, the building was constructed in 1938 and 1939 and is an example of the Simplified Classical style frequently used for federal buildings in late 1930s and early 1940s. In 2004 it was named for district judge Winston E. Arnow.

It was added to the National Register of Historic Places on July 11, 2014, as the United States Post Office and Court House.

== See also ==
- United States Customs House and Post Office (Pensacola, Florida)
