= Robert Hinkle (judge) =

American judge (born 1951)

Senior Judge of the United States District Court for the Northern District of Florida
- Incumbent
- Assumed office November 7, 2016

Chief Judge of the United States District Court for the Northern District of Florida
- In office 2004–2009
- Preceded by: Roger Vinson
- Succeeded by: Stephan P. Mickle

Judge of the United States District Court for the Northern District of Florida
- In office August 1, 1996 – November 7, 2016
- Appointed by: Bill Clinton
- Preceded by: William Henry Stafford Jr.
- Succeeded by: Allen Winsor

Personal details
- Born: Robert Lewis Hinkle; 1951 (age 74–75) Apalachicola, Florida, U.S.
- Education: Florida State University (BA); Harvard University (JD)

Robert Lewis Hinkle (born 1951) is a senior United States district judge of the United States District Court for the Northern District of Florida.

== Biography ==
Born on November 7, 1951, in Apalachicola, Florida, Hinkle received a Bachelor of Arts degree from Florida State University in 1972 and a Juris Doctor from Harvard Law School in 1976. He was a law clerk for Judge Irving Loeb Goldberg of United States Court of Appeals for the Fifth Circuit from 1976 to 1977. From 1977 to 1978, he was in private practice in Atlanta, Georgia, then practiced in Tallahassee, Florida from 1978 to 1996. He became an adjunct professor of law at Florida State University in 1981.

=== Federal judicial service ===
Hinkle was nominated by President Bill Clinton on June 6, 1996, to a seat vacated by William Henry Stafford Jr. of the United States District Court for the Northern District of Florida. He was confirmed by the United States Senate on July 25, 1996, and received his commission on August 1, 1996. He served as chief judge from 2004 to 2009. He assumed senior status on November 7, 2016.

=== Notable rulings ===
In 1999, Hinkle issued a ruling in Pemberton v. Tallahassee Memorial Regional Center that denied damages as claimed by the defendant upon whom the state forced a surgical procedure during labor.

On August 21, 2014, Hinkle issued a ruling in Brenner v. Scott that denied the state defendants' motion to dismiss and granted the same-sex couple plaintiffs' motion for a preliminary injunction. In ordering the injunction, Judge Hinkle found that Florida's statutory and constitutional bans on same-sex marriage were federally unconstitutional.

Hinkle heard the case Jones et al v. DeSantis which concerned a Florida law, SB 7066, which "required felons to pay legal fees as part of their sentences before regaining the vote". On May 24, 2020, he ruled that the law was "unconstitutional for those unable to pay, or unable to find out how much they owe". Hinkle's decision was overturned and the requirement found constitutional by the 11th Circuit Court of Appeals.

In June 2021, Hinkle preliminarily enjoined Senate Bill 7072, which levies fines and imposes additional penalties against social media platforms that blocked or otherwise inhibited content from political candidates and media organizations.

In June 2023, Hinkle issued a preliminary injunction temporarily blocking a Florida law that prohibited transgender minors from receiving puberty blockers and cross-sex hormones. His ruling allowed three transgender children to continue their treatment, emphasizing that gender identity is real and that denying these treatments could lead to significant harm, such as anxiety, depression, and even suicidal ideation.

In June 2024, Hinkle struck down the aforementioned law, while also striking down new requirements by the Florida Board of Medicine that required prescriptions for gender-affirming care to be made by a physician instead of a registered nurse or other medical professional, and required in-person appointments for gender-affirming care instead of remote or telehealth appointments. In his ruling, Hinkle reiterated that 'the defendants have explicitly admitted prohibiting or impeding individuals from pursuing their transgender identities is not a legitimate state interest' and yet 'a significant number of legislators and others involved in the adoption of the statute and rules at issue pursued this admittedly illegitimate interest.'

== Sources ==
Legal offices
| Preceded by William Henry Stafford Jr. | Judge of the United States District Court for the Northern District of Florida; 1996–2016 | Succeeded by Allen Winsor |
| Preceded by Roger Vinson | Chief Judge of the United States District Court for the Northern District of Florida; 2004–2009 | Succeeded by Stephan P. Mickle |
