= Pamela Cothran Marsh =

American lawyer (born 1965)

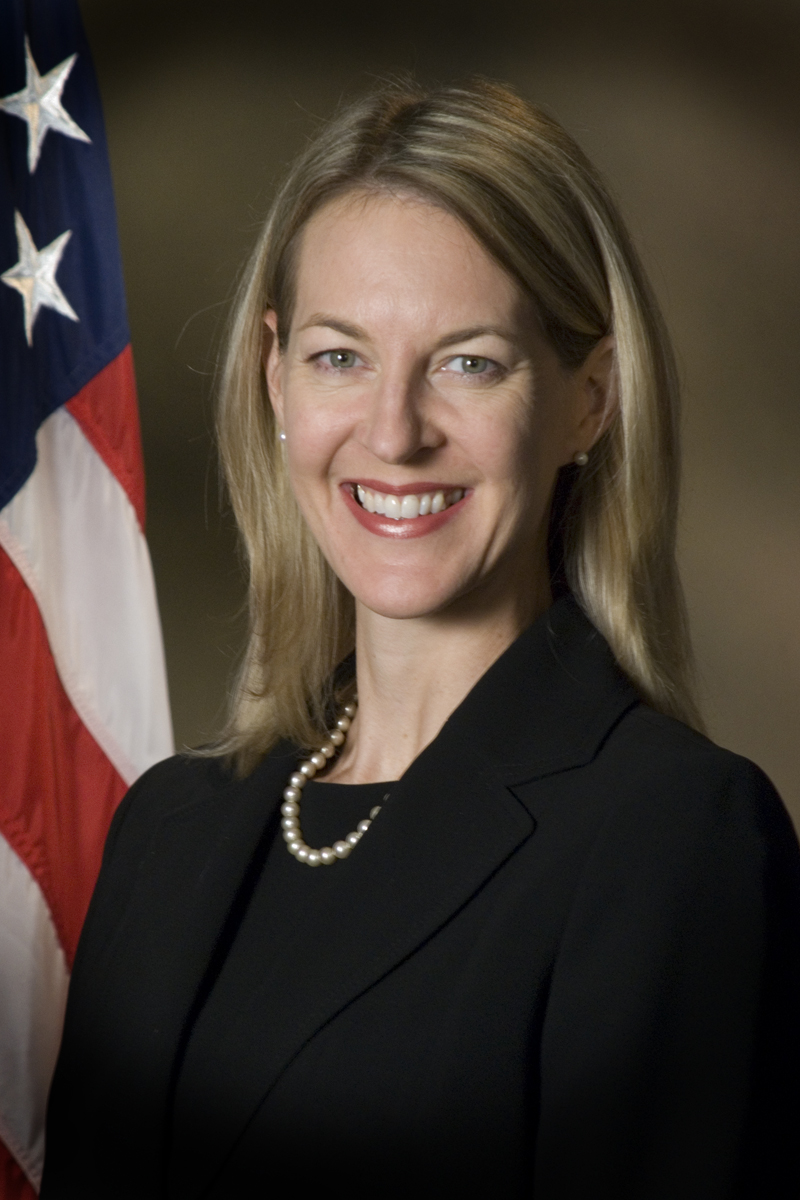

United States Attorney for the Northern District of Florida
- In office June 25, 2010 – September 4, 2015
- President: Barack Obama
- Preceded by: Thomas F. Kirwin (acting)
- Succeeded by: Christopher P. Canova (acting)

Personal details
- Born: July 29, 1965 (age 59); Atlanta, Georgia, U.S.
- Political party: Democratic
- Education: Georgetown University (BSFS, JD)

Pamela Cothran Marsh (born July 29, 1965) is an American attorney who served as the United States attorney for the Northern District of Florida from 2010 to 2015.
