= Winston Arnow =

American judge

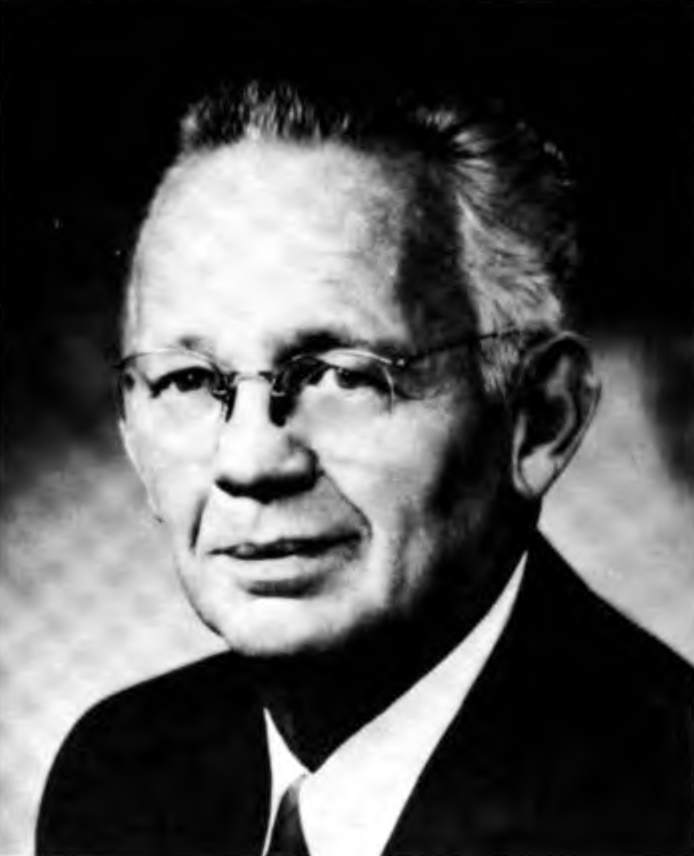

Senior Judge of the United States District Court for the Northern District of Florida
- In office March 14, 1981 – November 28, 1994

Chief Judge of the United States District Court for the Northern District of Florida
- In office 1969–1981
- Preceded by: G. Harrold Carswell
- Succeeded by: William Henry Stafford Jr.

Judge of the United States District Court for the Northern District of Florida
- In office December 7, 1967 – March 14, 1981
- Appointed by: Lyndon B. Johnson
- Preceded by: Seat established by 80 Stat. 75
- Succeeded by: Maurice M. Paul

Personal details
- Born: Winston Eugene Arnow; March 13, 1911 Micanopy, Florida, U.S.
- Died: November 28, 1994 (aged 83) Pensacola, Florida, U.S.
- Education: University of Florida (BBA); Fredric G. Levin College of Law (JD)

Winston E. Arnow U.S. Post Office and Court House, Pensacola, Florida

Winston Eugene Arnow (March 13, 1911 – November 28, 1994) was a United States district judge of the United States District Court for the Northern District of Florida.

== Education and career ==
Arnow was born on March 13, 1911, in Micanopy, Florida, near Gainesville. Arnow received his Bachelor of Business Administration degree from University of Florida in 1932 and his Juris Doctor from the Fredric G. Levin College of Law at the University of Florida in 1933. He briefly entered private practice in Gainesville from 1933 before taking a statistical position with the Federal Emergency Relief Administration in Florida from 1933 to 1934. Arnow served as a law clerk to the Florida Supreme Court in Tallahassee from 1934 to 1935. Arnow returned to private practice in Gainesville from 1935 to 1942. From 1940 to 1942 he served as a municipal judge of the City of Gainesville before serving in the United States Army in the Judge Advocate General's Corps as a major from 1942 to 1946, during World War II. Arnow resumed his position as a Gainesville municipal judge from 1946 to 1949 before returning to private practice.

== Federal judicial service ==
President Lyndon B. Johnson nominated Arnow to the United States District Court for the Northern District of Florida on November 29, 1967, to a new seat created by 80 Stat. 75. Confirmed by the Senate on December 7, 1967, he received commission the same day. Arnow served as Chief Judge from 1969 to 1981, assuming senior status on March 14, 1981. He remained on the court until he died at West Florida Hospital in Pensacola in 1994 at age 84 after a long illness. He was married to Frances Day Arnow. The Winston E. Arnow United States Courthouse in Pensacola was renamed in his honor in 2004.

=== Notable cases ===
In 1969, Arnow ordered the Escambia County School District desegregated. In 1972 he presided over the trial of the Gainesville Eight anti-Vietnam War activists who were indicted on charges of conspiracy to disrupt the 1972 Republican National Convention in Miami Beach, Florida. All eight were acquitted. In 1978 he drew up a special district to assure that the county commission would have at least one black member. In 1981 he sealed a settlement in a discrimination case, requiring the United States Air Force to establish a $2 million fund and Eglin Air Force Base to hire 100 black workers for its civilian labor force and promote others already on the payroll.

Legal offices
Preceded by Seat established by 80 Stat. 75	Judge of the United States District Court for the Northern District of Florida; 1967–1981	Succeeded by Maurice M. Paul
Preceded by G. Harrold Carswell	Chief Judge of the United States District Court for the Northern District of Florida; 1969–1981	Succeeded by William Henry Stafford Jr.
