= United States Attorney =

Chief prosecutor representing the US federal government

Flag of a United States attorney.

United States attorneys are officials of the U.S. Department of Justice who serve as the chief federal law enforcement officers in each of the 94 U.S. federal judicial districts. Each U.S. attorney serves as the United States' chief federal criminal prosecutor in their judicial district and represents the U.S. federal government in civil litigation in federal and state court within their geographic jurisdiction. U.S. attorneys must be nominated by the president and confirmed by the Senate, after which they serve four-year terms.

The 94 district offices are located throughout the United States, Puerto Rico, the U.S. Virgin Islands, Guam, and the Northern Mariana Islands. One U.S. attorney serves each of the judicial districts, with the exception of Guam and the Northern Mariana Islands, where a single U.S. attorney serves both districts. U.S. attorneys act under the guidance of the United States Attorneys' Manual. They supervise district offices with as many as 350 assistant U.S. attorneys (AUSAs) and as many as 350 support personnel.

U.S. Attorney's Offices are staffed mainly by assistant U.S. attorneys (AUSA). Often colloquially called "federal prosecutors", assistant U.S. attorneys are government lawyers who act as prosecutors in federal criminal trials and as the United States federal government's lawyers in civil litigation in which the United States is a party. In carrying out their duties as prosecutors, AUSAs have the authority to investigate persons, issue subpoenas, file formal criminal charges, plea bargain with defendants, and grant immunity to witnesses and accused criminals.

U.S. attorneys and their offices are part of the Department of Justice. U.S. attorneys receive oversight, supervision, and administrative support services through the Justice Department's Executive Office for United States Attorneys. Selected U.S. attorneys participate in the Advisory Committee of U.S. Attorneys.

== History and statutory authority ==
The Office of the United States Attorney was created by the Judiciary Act of 1789, along with the office of Attorney General and United States Marshal. The same act also specified the structure of the Supreme Court of the United States and established inferior courts making up the United States Federal Judiciary, including a district court system. Thus, the office of U.S. Attorney is older than the Department of Justice. The Judiciary Act of 1789 provided for the appointment in each judicial district of a "Person learned in the law to act as attorney for the United States...whose duty it shall be to prosecute in each district all delinquents for crimes and offenses cognizable under the authority of the United States, and all civil actions in which the United States shall be concerned..." Prior to the existence of the Department of Justice, the U.S. attorneys were independent of the attorney general, and did not come under the AG's supervision and authority until 1870, with the creation of the Department of Justice.

== Appointment ==
U.S. attorneys are appointed by the president of the United States for a term of four years, with appointments subject to confirmation by the Senate. A U.S. attorney continues in office, beyond the appointed term, until a successor is appointed and qualified. By law, each United States attorney is subject to removal by the president. The attorney general has had the authority since 1986 to appoint interim U.S. attorneys to fill a vacancy.

=== United States attorneys controversy ===
2006 dismissal of U.S. attorneys controversy
- Timeline
- Summary of attorneys
- Congressional hearings
- List of dismissed attorneys
- All related articles

The governing statute, 28 U.S.C. § 546 provided, up until March 9, 2006:

(c) A person appointed as United States attorney under this section may serve until the earlier of—

(1) the qualification of a United States attorney for such district appointed by the President under section 541 of this title; or
(2) the expiration of 120 days after appointment by the Attorney General under this section.

(d) If an appointment expires under subsection (c)(2), the district court for such district may appoint a United States attorney to serve until the vacancy is filled. The order of appointment by the court shall be filed with the clerk of the court.

On March 9, 2006, President George W. Bush signed into law the USA PATRIOT and Terrorism Prevention Reauthorization Act of 2005 which amended Section 546 by striking subsections (c) and (d) and inserting the following new subsection:

(c) A person appointed as United States attorney under this section may serve until the qualification of a United States Attorney for such district appointed by the President under section 541 of this title.

This, in effect, extinguished the 120-day limit on interim U.S. attorneys, and their appointment had an indefinite term. If the president failed to put forward any nominee to the Senate, then the Senate confirmation process was avoided, as the Attorney General-appointed interim U.S. attorney could continue in office without limit or further action. Related to the dismissal of U.S. attorneys controversy, in March 2007 the Senate and the House voted to re-instate the 120-day term limit on interim attorneys via the Preserving United States Attorney Independence Act of 2007. The bill was signed by President George W. Bush, and became law in June 2007.

=== History of interim U.S. attorney appointments ===
Senator Dianne Feinstein (D, California), summarized the history of interim United States Attorney appointments, on March 19, 2007 in the Senate.

When first looking into this issue, I found that the statutes had given the courts the authority to appoint an interim U.S. attorney and that this dated back as far as the Civil War. Specifically, the authority was first vested with the circuit courts in March 1863.

Then, in 1898, a House of Representatives report explained that while Congress believed it was important to have the courts appoint an interim U.S. attorney:

"There was a problem relying on circuit courts since the circuit justice is not always to be found in the circuit and time is wasted in ascertaining his whereabouts."

Therefore, at that time, the interim appointment authority was switched to the district courts; that is, in 1898 it was switched to the district courts.

Thus, for almost 100 years, the district courts were in charge of appointing interim U.S. attorneys, and they did so with virtually no problems. This structure was left undisturbed until 1986 when the statute was changed during the Reagan administration. In a bill that was introduced by Senator Strom Thurmond, the statute was changed to give the appointment authority to the Attorney General, but even then it was restricted and the Attorney General had a 120-day time limit. After that time, if a nominee was not confirmed, the district courts would appoint an interim U.S. attorney. The adoption of this language was part of a larger package that was billed as technical amendments to criminal law, and thus there was no recorded debate in either the House or the Senate and both Chambers passed the bill by voice vote.

Then, 20 years later, in March 2006 – again without much debate and again as a part of a larger package – a statutory change was inserted into the PATRIOT Act reauthorization. This time, the Executive's power was expanded even further, giving the Attorney General the authority to appoint an interim replacement indefinitely and without Senate confirmation.

== Role of U.S. attorneys ==
The U.S. attorney is both the primary representative and the administrative head of the Office of the U.S. Attorney for the district. The U.S. Attorney's Office (USAO) is the chief prosecutor for the United States in criminal law cases, and represents the United States in civil law cases as either the defendant or plaintiff, as appropriate. However, they are not the only ones that may represent the United States in Court. In certain circumstances, using an action called a qui tam, any U.S. citizen, provided they are represented by an attorney, can represent the interests of the United States, and share in penalties assessed against guilty parties.

As chief federal law enforcement officers, U.S. attorneys have authority over all federal law enforcement personnel within their districts and may direct them to engage, cease or assist in investigations. In practice, this has involved command of Federal Bureau of Investigation assets but also includes other agencies under the Department of Justice, such as the Bureau of Alcohol, Tobacco and Firearms and Drug Enforcement Administration. Additionally, U.S. attorneys cooperate with other non-DOJ law enforcement agencies – such as the United States Secret Service and Immigration and Customs Enforcement – to prosecute cases relevant to their jurisdictional areas.

The U.S. attorney for the District of Columbia has the additional responsibility of prosecuting local criminal cases in the Superior Court of the District of Columbia, the equivalent of a municipal court for the national capital. The Superior Court is a federal Article I court.

== Executive Office for United States Attorneys ==
The Executive Office for United States Attorneys (EOUSA) provides the administrative support for the 93 United States attorneys (encompassing 94 United States Attorney offices, as the Guam and the Northern Mariana Islands has a single U.S. attorney for both districts), including:

- General executive assistance and direction,
- Policy development,
- Administrative management direction and oversight,
- Operational support,
- Coordination with other components of the United States Department of Justice and other federal agencies.

These responsibilities include certain legal, budgetary, administrative, and personnel services, as well as legal education.

The EOUSA was created on April 6, 1953, by Attorney General Order No. 8-53 to provide for close liaison between the Department of Justice in Washington, DC, and the 93 U.S. attorneys located throughout the 50 states, the District of Columbia, Guam, the Northern Mariana Islands, Puerto Rico, and the U.S. Virgin Islands. It was organized by Ninth Circuit Court of Appeals judge James R. Browning, who also served as its first chief.

== List of current U.S. attorneys' offices ==
Jurisdiction	Officeholder	Term start
U.S. Attorney for the Middle District of Alabama	Thomas Govan Jr.^{*}	May 29, 2026
U.S. Attorney for the Northern District of Alabama	Phil Williams^{*}	May 28, 2026
U.S. Attorney for the Southern District of Alabama	Sean P. Costello^{*}	February 27, 2021
U.S. Attorney for the District of Alaska	Michael J. Heyman^{‡}	March 3, 2025
U.S. Attorney for the District of Arizona	Timothy Courchaine^{‡}	February 28, 2025
U.S. Attorney for the Eastern District of Arkansas	Jonathan D. Ross^{‡}	January 1, 2021
U.S. Attorney for the Western District of Arkansas	Kevin R. Holmes^{*}	May 22, 2026
U.S. Attorney for the Central District of California	Bill Essayli^{^}	April 2, 2025
U.S. Attorney for the Eastern District of California	Eric Grant^{‡}	August 11, 2025
U.S. Attorney for the Northern District of California	Craig H. Missakian^{‡}	May 27, 2025
U.S. Attorney for the Southern District of California	Adam Gordon^{‡}	April 11, 2025
U.S. Attorney for the District of Colorado	Peter McNeilly^{‡}	June 16, 2025
U.S. Attorney for the District of Columbia	Jeanine Pirro^{*}	May 14, 2025
U.S. Attorney for the District of Connecticut	David X. Sullivan^{‡}	May 12, 2025
U.S. Attorney for the District of Delaware	Benjamin L. Wallace^{‡}	December 12, 2025
U.S. Attorney for the Middle District of Florida	Gregory Kehoe^{‡}	March 31, 2025
U.S. Attorney for the Northern District of Florida	John P. Heekin^{*}	June 2, 2025
U.S. Attorney for the Southern District of Florida	Jason A. Reding Quiñones^{*}	August 13, 2025
U.S. Attorney for the Middle District of Georgia	Will Keyes^{‡}	June 24, 2025
U.S. Attorney for the Northern District of Georgia	Theodore S. Hertzberg^{‡}	May 14, 2025
U.S. Attorney for the Southern District of Georgia	Meg E. Heap^{‡}	August 18, 2025
U.S. Attorney for the Districts of Guam and the Northern Mariana Islands	Shawn N. Anderson	January 4, 2018
U.S. Attorney for the District of Hawaii	Ken Sorenson^{*}	January 20, 2025
U.S. Attorney for the District of Idaho	Bart Davis^{*}	October 10, 2025
U.S. Attorney for the Central District of Illinois	Gregory M. Gilmore^{*}	January 2, 2025
U.S. Attorney for the Northern District of Illinois	Andrew S. Boutros^{‡}	April 7, 2025
U.S. Attorney for the Southern District of Illinois	Steven D. Weinhoeft^{‡}	February 28, 2025
U.S. Attorney for the Northern District of Indiana	Adam L. Mildred^{*}	January 6, 2026
U.S. Attorney for the Southern District of Indiana	Thomas E. Wheeler^{*}	July 14, 2025
U.S. Attorney for the Northern District of Iowa	Leif Olson^{*}	October 20, 2025
U.S. Attorney for the Southern District of Iowa	David Waterman^{*}	October 15, 2025
U.S. Attorney for the District of Kansas	Ryan Kriegshauser^{*}	July 31, 2025
U.S. Attorney for the Eastern District of Kentucky	Jason Parman^{^}	February 26, 2025
U.S. Attorney for the Western District of Kentucky	Kyle G. Bumgarner^{†}	June 2, 2025
U.S. Attorney for the Eastern District of Louisiana	David I. Courcelle^{*}	December 29, 2025
U.S. Attorney for the Middle District of Louisiana	Kurt Wall^{*}	October 14, 2025
U.S. Attorney for the Western District of Louisiana	Zachary Keller^{*}	September 29, 2025
U.S. Attorney for the District of Maine	Andrew Benson^{*}	October 22, 2025
U.S. Attorney for the District of Maryland	Kelly O. Hayes^{‡}	March 3, 2025
U.S. Attorney for the District of Massachusetts	Leah Foley^{‡}	January 20, 2025
U.S. Attorney for the Eastern District of Michigan	Jerome F. Gorgon Jr.^{*}	May 2, 2025
U.S. Attorney for the Western District of Michigan	Timothy VerHey^{*}	July 21, 2025
U.S. Attorney for the District of Minnesota	Daniel Rosen^{*}	October 10, 2025
U.S. Attorney for the Northern District of Mississippi	Scott Leary^{*}	November 17, 2025
U.S. Attorney for the Southern District of Mississippi	James "Baxter" Kruger^{*}	November 17, 2025
U.S. Attorney for the Eastern District of Missouri	Thomas Albus^{*}	August 1, 2025
U.S. Attorney for the Western District of Missouri	R. Matthew Price^{*}	August 1, 2025
U.S. Attorney for the District of Montana	Mark Steger Smith^{^}	June 1, 2026
U.S. Attorney for the District of Nebraska	Lesley A. Woods^{*}	May 6, 2025
U.S. Attorney for the District of Nevada	Sigal Chattah^{^}	April 1, 2025
U.S. Attorney for the District of New Hampshire	Erin Creegan^{*}	August 13, 2025
U.S. Attorney for the District of New Jersey	Robert Frazer^{‡}	March 23, 2026
U.S. Attorney for the District of New Mexico	Ryan Ellison^{^}	April 18, 2025
U.S. Attorney for the Eastern District of New York	Joseph Nocella Jr.^{‡}	May 5, 2025
U.S. Attorney for the Northern District of New York	John A. Sarcone III^{^}	March 4, 2025
U.S. Attorney for the Southern District of New York	Jamie McDonald^{‡}	July 29, 2026
U.S. Attorney for the Western District of New York	Michael DiGiacomo^{‡}	February 28, 2025
U.S. Attorney for the Eastern District of North Carolina	William Ellis Boyle^{*}	August 7, 2025
U.S. Attorney for the Middle District of North Carolina	Dan Bishop^{*}	November 12, 2025
U.S. Attorney for the Western District of North Carolina	Russ Ferguson^{*}	March 11, 2025
U.S. Attorney for the District of North Dakota	Nicholas W. Chase^{*}	October 10, 2025
U.S. Attorney for the Northern District of Ohio	David M. Toepfer^{*}	July 23, 2025
U.S. Attorney for the Southern District of Ohio	Dominick Gerace II^{*}	August 11, 2025
U.S. Attorney for the Eastern District of Oklahoma	Christopher Wilson^{‡}	December 26, 2021
U.S. Attorney for the Northern District of Oklahoma	Christopher Nassar^{*}	August 14, 2026
U.S. Attorney for the Western District of Oklahoma	Robert J. Troester^{‡}	March 1, 2021
U.S. Attorney for the District of Oregon	Scott Bradford^{‡}	July 29, 2025
U.S. Attorney for the Eastern District of Pennsylvania	David Metcalf^{*}	March 12, 2025
U.S. Attorney for the Middle District of Pennsylvania	Brian D. Miller^{*}	October 27, 2025
U.S. Attorney for the Western District of Pennsylvania	Troy Rivetti^{‡}	January 20, 2025
U.S. Attorney for the District of Puerto Rico	Héctor E. Ramírez-Carbó^{^}	July 26, 2026
U.S. Attorney for the District of Rhode Island	Charles C. Calenda^{^}	December 30, 2025
U.S. Attorney for the District of South Carolina	Bryan P. Stirling^{*}	April 28, 2025
U.S. Attorney for the District of South Dakota	Ron A. Parsons Jr.^{*}	October 14, 2025
U.S. Attorney for the Eastern District of Tennessee	Francis M. Hamilton III^{‡}	April 25, 2022
U.S. Attorney for the Middle District of Tennessee	Braden Boucek^{*}	December 24, 2025
U.S. Attorney for the Western District of Tennessee	D. Michael Dunavant^{*}	October 10, 2025
U.S. Attorney for the Eastern District of Texas	Jay R. Combs^{‡}	May 29, 2025
U.S. Attorney for the Northern District of Texas	Ryan Raybould^{*}	November 17, 2025
U.S. Attorney for the Southern District of Texas	Aaron Reitz^{‡}	July 9, 2026
U.S. Attorney for the Western District of Texas	Justin R. Simmons^{‡}	May 30, 2025
U.S. Attorney for the District of Utah	Melissa Holyoak^{*}	November 17, 2025
U.S. Attorney for the District of Vermont	Jonathan A. Ophardt^{^}	January 10, 2026
U.S. Attorney for the District of the Virgin Islands	Adam Sleeper^{*}	April 14, 2025
U.S. Attorney for the Eastern District of Virginia	Theophani K. Stamos^{^}	July 16, 2026
U.S. Attorney for the Western District of Virginia	Robert N. Tracci^{^}	August 20, 2025
U.S. Attorney for the Eastern District of Washington	Pete Serrano^{^}	January 20, 2026
U.S. Attorney for the Western District of Washington	Vacant	
U.S. Attorney for the Northern District of West Virginia	Matthew Harvey^{*}	October 10, 2025
U.S. Attorney for the Southern District of West Virginia	Moore Capito^{*}	October 10, 2025
U.S. Attorney for the Eastern District of Wisconsin	Brad Schimel^{†}	November 17, 2025
U.S. Attorney for the Western District of Wisconsin	Chadwick Elgersma^{‡}	June 28, 2025
U.S. Attorney for the District of Wyoming	Darin Smith^{*}	August 11, 2025

Legend
Asterisk (^{*})	Senate confirmed
Dagger (^{†})	Interim - appointed by Attorney General under 28 U.S.C. § 546(a)
Double Dagger (^{‡})	Court appointed under 28 U.S.C. § 546(d)
Caret (^{^})	Acting

Map of the boundaries of the United States courts of appeals (by color) and United States District Courts. All District Courts lie within the boundary of a single jurisdiction, usually in a state (heavier lines); some states have more than one District Court (lighter lines denote those jurisdictions)

== Defunct U.S. attorneys' offices ==
- U. S. Attorney for the District of Michigan (February 24, 1863)
- U. S. Attorney for the Eastern District of South Carolina (October 2, 1965)
- U. S. Attorney for the Western District of South Carolina (October 2, 1965)
- U. S. Attorney for the Eastern District of Illinois (October 2, 1978; succeeded by the Central District of Illinois)
- U. S. Attorney for the Panama Canal Zone (March 31, 1982)
- U. S. Attorney for the District of Indiana
- U.S. Attorney for the District of Washington
- United States Attorney for the District of Arkansas
- United States Attorney for the Western District of Florida
- United States Attorney for the Eastern District of Florida
- United States Attorney for the District of Georgia
- United States Attorney for the District of Illinois
- United States Attorney for the Territory of Iowa
- United States Attorney for the District of Kentucky
- United States Attorney for the District of Louisiana
- United States Attorney for the District of Michigan
- United States Attorney for the District of Mississippi
- United States Attorney for the District of Missouri
- United States Attorney for the Territory of New Mexico
- United States Attorney for the District of New York
- United States Attorney for the District of North Carolina
- United States Attorney for the Territory of Dakota
- United States Attorney for the District of Ohio
- United States Attorney for the District of Oklahoma
- United States Attorney for the District of South Carolina
- United States Attorney for the District of Tennessee
- United States Attorney for the District of Texas
- United States Attorney for the District of Virginia
- United States Attorney for the District of West Virginia
- United States Attorney for the District of Wisconsin
- United States Attorney for the District of China (Shanghai) (1928–1937)
- United States Attorney for the District of Alaska, Sitka
  - First District, Juneau (1898–1957)
  - Second District, Nome (1900–1953)
  - Third District, Eagle, Fairbanks, Valdez, Anchorage (1900–1960)
  - Fourth District, Fairbanks (1909–1960)

== See also ==
- List of United States attorneys appointed by Joe Biden
- List of United States attorneys appointed by Donald Trump
- Dismissal of U.S. attorneys controversy (2007)
- 2017 dismissal of U.S. attorneys
- Special counsel
- United States Attorney General
- United States Department of Justice
