= Same-sex marriage in Arizona =

Same-sex marriage has been legal in Arizona since October 17, 2014. The U.S. state had denied marriage rights to same-sex couples by statute since 1996 and by an amendment to its State Constitution approved by voters in 2008. On October 17, Judge John W. Sedwick ruled in two lawsuits that Arizona's ban on same-sex marriage was unconstitutional, and enjoined the state from enforcing its ban, effective immediately. Attorney General Tom Horne said the state would not appeal that ruling, and instructed county clerks to comply and issue marriage licenses to same-sex couples.

Several Arizona cities and towns continue to provide civil unions or domestic partnerships to same-sex couples, offering a subset of the rights and benefits of marriage. Bisbee was the first city to establish civil unions for same-sex couples on June 4, 2013, followed by Tucson later that same month.

== Legal history ==
=== Restrictions ===
==== Statute ====
In 1975, the Arizona State Legislature passed an emergency bill defining marriage as "a union between a man and a woman" after the Arizona Supreme Court invalidated a marriage license issued to two men by a county clerk in Phoenix.

In 1996, Arizona state legislators passed a ban on same-sex marriage and the recognition of same-sex marriages performed outside of the state. Governor Fife Symington, whose victory in the 1994 election was based in part on campaigning against his opponent's, Eddie Basha Jr., support for same-sex marriage, signed the bill into law.

Arizona statutes still contain a same-sex marriage ban, as well as a ban on recognizing same-sex marriage that are contracted outside of Arizona. The statutory ban is unenforceable due to Obergefell v. Hodges, and the ban on recognition of same-sex marriage contracted outside of Arizona is unenforceable due to the passage of the Respect for Marriage Act in 2022.

==== Constitution ====
Arizona voters have twice considered amendments to the Constitution of Arizona that would deny marriage rights to same-sex couples. On November 7, 2006, voters defeated Proposition 107, a state-initiated constitutional amendment that would have banned same-sex marriage and any legal status similar to marriage, by a margin of 48.2% to 51.8%, departing from the national trend that saw seven other states approve similar constitutional amendments the same day.

On May 12, 2008, the Arizona House of Representatives voted 33 to 25 in favor of Proposition 102, a constitutional amendment which defined marriage in Arizona as "the union of one man and one woman". The Arizona Senate passed the amendment 14–11 on June 25, 2008. On November 4, 2008, Arizona voters passed Proposition 102 by a vote of 56.2% in favor to 43.8% against. Unlike the failed Proposition 107, Proposition 102 did not ban civil unions.

On June 17, 2013, Equal Marriage Arizona filed an initiative to place on the November 2014 ballot an amendment that would substitute a gender-neutral definition of marriage in place of the one added to the State Constitution in 2008. It needed to gather 259,213 valid signatures by July 3, 2014, to have the initiative appear on that November's ballot. The group suspended its efforts in September 2013, announcing that "The various LGBT advocacy groups in the state and nationally announced they weren't going to throw their support behind the initiative. Without their help, we aren't able to do it." Other groups contended that 2016, a presidential election year, would have proven a better opportunity, but no initiative was placed on the ballot that year.

=== Lawsuits ===
==== Federal cases ====
On January 6, 2014, in Connolly v. Roche, originally Connolly v. Brewer and later Connolly v. Jeanes, four same-sex couples filed a class-action lawsuit in the U.S. District Court for the District of Arizona seeking to have Arizona's definition of marriage ruled unconstitutional. Two of the plaintiff couples had married in California and two had adopted children through Arizona's public foster-care system. The amended complaint named as defendants three county court clerks acting in their official capacities and added two couples from the Flagstaff area and one couple from the Tucson area for a total of seven couples. On March 13, Lambda Legal filed a lawsuit, Majors v. Horne, in the same court on behalf of seven same-sex couples and a widow and a widower, each the surviving spouse of a same-sex couple. Several of the couples were the parents of minor children and most had married in other states, including California, Iowa, Minnesota, New Mexico, New York, and Washington. On September 12, U.S. District Judge John W. Sedgwick ordered that the state record a death certificate for plaintiff George Martinez as the husband of Fred McQuire.

On October 17, 2014, U.S. District Judge John W. Sedwick, ruling in both cases, declared Arizona's ban on same-sex marriage unconstitutional and enjoined the state from enforcing its ban, effective immediately. The Arizona Attorney General, Tom Horne, said the state would not appeal the ruling and instructed county clerks to issue marriage licenses to same-sex couples: "Effective immediately, the clerks of Arizona county Superior Courts cannot deny a marriage license to any otherwise eligible licensees on the grounds that the license permits a marriage between persons of the same sex." While Horne disagreed with the court decision, he said "it would be unethical for me to file an appeal that would have no chance of success." Governor Jan Brewer also said she opposed the ruling, stating that it "thwarted the will of the people". Sedwick said he was bound by recent decisions of the Ninth Circuit in Sevcik v. Sandoval and Latta v. Otter: "The Court of Appeals for the 9th Circuit recently ruled that substantially identical provisions of Nevada and Idaho law that prohibit same-sex marriages are invalid because they deny same-sex couples equal protection of the law, the right to which is guaranteed by the Constitution of the United States. This court is bound by decisions of the Court of Appeals for the 9th Circuit." He also said that any appeal by state officials to the Ninth Circuit would be unsuccessful. The American Civil Liberties Union welcomed the court ruling, "Today's ruling brings security to thousands of families in Arizona. It's a moment to be celebrated. Equal protection of the law is one of the fundamental principles that allows our country to thrive and evolve." The state's Roman Catholic bishops said the decision "reflects a misunderstanding of the institution of marriage", and Cathi Herrod, president of the Center for Arizona Policy, said she was "heartbroken", "We mourn the loss of a culture and its ethical foundation. We mourn a culture that continues to turn its back on timeless principles." The editorial board of The Arizona Republic, responded, "We will soon find out if the institution of marriage can withstand the flood of loving couples who wish to formalize their relationship and avail themselves of all the legal protections heterosexual couples have long taken for granted. We expect it will do just fine. It hasn't suffered in any of the 30 other states where gays and lesbians now unite in matrimony. Oh, there will be those who lash out at judges who uphold constitutional principles over popular passions. There will be those who insist that 'God still ordains marriage to only be the union of one man and one woman,' as Center for Arizona Policy President Cathi Herrod did this morning in an email blast that promises to 'redouble our efforts to rebuild a culture of marriage.' They are free to do so. Churches can continue to decide who they will marry. That is their constitutional right. ..."

The Maricopa County Clerk's Office quickly began issuing marriage licenses to same-sex couples. The first couple to receive a license were Karen Bailey and Nelda Majors, plaintiffs in Majors and a couple for 56 years, on Friday, October 17 immediately after Attorney General Horne instructed county clerks to comply with the district court's rulings. City judges in Phoenix performed several marriage ceremonies in Mayor Greg Stanton's conference room Friday afternoon, with Stanton passing out banana butter cream cake to the newlywed couples.

On November 18, state officials announced they would appeal the rulings to the Ninth Circuit Court of Appeals. The state solicitor, Robert Ellman, said the state hoped to avoid paying the original plaintiffs' attorneys' fees should the U.S. Supreme Court uphold bans on same-sex marriage. On December 1, all parties asked the court to suspend proceedings pending action by the U.S. Supreme Court in a similar case from the Sixth Circuit Court of Appeals. The Ninth Circuit agreed to that request the next day, suspending proceedings until March 25, 2015. Both appeals were rejected in September and December 2015, respectively. The state was ordered to pay $200,000 in the Connolly case and $300,000 in the Majors case in attorneys' fees for the plaintiffs.

==== State cases ====
On April 13, 1994, the Pima County Superior Court ruled in Callender v. Corbett against a group of same-sex couples who had challenged the state's ban on same-sex marriages, citing that any change in marriage law was a matter for the Arizona Legislature to deal with. The plaintiffs filed an appeal, but later dropped it. On July 7, 2003, Harold Donald Standhardt and Tod Alan Keltner sued the state in Standhardt v. State of Arizona in the Maricopa County Superior Court, alleging that the state's ban on same-sex marriages violated the due process clauses of the federal and state constitutions. The Arizona Court of Appeals ruled against the couple on October 8, 2003, and the Arizona Supreme Court declined to review the case on May 25, 2004.

On August 13, 2014, the Arizona Court of Appeals ruled that the state's constitutional and statutory bans on same-sex marriage did not prevent the trial court from granting a divorce in a case, Beatie v. Beatie, in which one of the spouses was a transgender individual and had been married in a jurisdiction which had recognized their marriage as consisting of the union of one man and one woman.

=== Developments after legalization ===
On June 26, 2015, the U.S. Supreme Court ruled in Obergefell v. Hodges that the Due Process and Equal Protection clauses of the U.S. Constitution guarantees same-sex couples the right to marry. The decision legalizing same-sex marriage nationwide in the United States. Following the overturning of Roe v. Wade in June 2022 by the U.S. Supreme Court, Governor Doug Ducey said he was "not interested" in revisiting the issue of same-sex marriage.

== Native American nations ==
Same-sex marriage is legal on the reservations of the Ak-Chin Indian Community, the Colorado River Indian Tribes, the Fort McDowell Yavapai Nation, the Pascua Yaqui Tribe, the Salt River Pima–Maricopa Indian Community, the San Carlos Apache Tribe, the White Mountain Apache Tribe, and the Yavapai–Apache Nation. It is explicitly prohibited in the Gila River Indian Community, which passed a motion banning same-sex marriages following the U.S. Supreme Court's ruling in Obergefell v. Hodges in June 2015, and the Navajo Nation, following the passage of the Diné Marriage Act in 2005. A bill to legalize same-sex marriage was introduced to the Navajo Nation Council by Delegate Eugene Tso of Chinle in July 2022.

=== Two-spirit marriages ===
Marriages between two-spirit people and men or women have been historically performed among many of these tribes. Navajo culture has traditionally recognized two-spirit individuals who were born male but wore women's clothing and performed everyday household work and artistic handiwork which were regarded as belonging to the feminine sphere. They are known in the Navajo language as nádleehi (pronounced [nátɬèːhì]). While the nádleehi had access to both masculine and feminine spheres of work, aside from hunting and warfare, they typically pursued feminine activities such as pottery making, weaving and tanning of hides, but also chanting, which was primarily a men's activity. Associated with prosperity and believed to have originated in the third world of the Holy People, the nádleehi directed the planting and the fieldwork, and generally functioned as head of a household. They were known for their skills in matchmaking and mediated between the sexes in matters of conflict and love. Traditionally, "real" nádleehi did not marry and had sexual intercourse exclusively with men, while "those who pretend to be nádleehi" could marry either men or women but if they married they would generally take on the clothing and activities of a man. The nádleehi status thus created the possibility of a marriage between two biological males in Navajo culture. Two-spirit people are known as ndéʼsdzan (pronounced [ntɛ́ʔstsàn]) in the Western Apache language.

The Cocopah have also traditionally recognized such two-spirit individuals, known in their language as elha (pronounced [eˈɬʲa]). The elha "talked like women", "sought out female company" and refused to learn masculine tasks, and they married men without indication of polygyny. The Mohave people refer to two-spirit individuals who crossed out of the masculine gender as ʼalyha (pronounced [ʔəlʲˈhaː]). The ʼalyha married men and were regarded as "especially diligent wives", often sought out by shamans. They were spiritually important for the tribe as they were considered great healers, as were the hwame (pronounced [hʷaˈmeː]), individuals who were born female but wore men's clothing and performed men's activities. The hwame married women, and could claim paternity of a child if they married a pregnant woman. Living together with an ʼalyha or a hwame followed the same patterns as did the establishment and dissolution of opposite-sex marriages. Similarly, the Maricopa people have traditionally recognized two-spirit people, known as ilyahai (pronounced [ilʲaˈxaj]), who were born male but wore women's clothing and performed women's tasks, and married men. The Maricopa refer to female-bodied two-spirit individuals who performed men's activities as kwirahame (pronounced [ˌkʷiraxaˈme]). Among the neighboring Quechan, two-spirit individuals who were born male but performed women's activities, such as grounding corn and fetching water, are known as elxa (pronounced [elˈxaː]). They are said to have forged lasting marriages with men. The two-spirit status thus allowed for marriages between two biological females or two biological males to be performed in these tribes.

Among the Pima people, two-spirit individuals did not cross-dress but "act[ed], talk[ed], and express[ed] themselves like members of the opposite sex, showing an interest in duties and work of the other sex, and a marked preference for their companionship." They are known in their language as ʼuvïkvaḍ (pronounced [ˈʔuvɨkvaɖ]; plural: ʼuʼuikvaḍ), and it is likely they too were able to enter into marriages with men. The Southern Paiute tüwasawuts (pronounced [tɯˈwɑsɑwuts]) could likewise marry men. The tüwasawuts had a "preference for feminine tasks as children" and carried out women's work in the community. Robert Lowie reported in 1924 that they "led the women in searching for grass seeds and that, like the women, [they] also roasted grass seeds". The Hopi call them hova (pronounced [ˈhoβa]). They had sexual intercourse exclusively with men, but traditionally remained unmarried.

== Demographics and marriage statistics ==
Data from the 2000 U.S. census showed that 12,332 same-sex couples were living in Arizona. By 2005, this had increased to 16,931 couples, likely attributed to same-sex couples' growing willingness to disclose their partnerships on government surveys. Same-sex couples lived in all counties of the state, and constituted 1.1% of coupled households and 0.6% of all households in the state. Most couples lived in Maricopa, Pima and Pinal counties, but the counties with the highest percentage of same-sex couples were La Paz (0.78% of all county households) and Apache (0.71%). Same-sex partners in Arizona were on average younger than opposite-sex partners, and significantly more likely to be employed. In addition, the average and median household incomes of same-sex couples were higher than different-sex couples, but same-sex couples were far less likely to own a home than opposite-sex partners. 18% of same-sex couples in Arizona were raising children under the age of 18, with an estimated 5,321 children living in households headed by same-sex couples in 2005.

== Domestic partnerships and civil unions ==
There have been several proposals to promote a voter initiative legalizing civil unions by groups of private citizens, including one gay rights activist from the United Kingdom. Opinion polls have indicated that a measure creating civil unions statewide would have a high likelihood of passage. In 2010, Equality Arizona, which opposes such a "separate-but-equal" status, announced it was considering other ways to respond to the passage of Proposition 102 in 2008.

=== State employee benefits ===
Arizona began providing benefits to same-sex partners of state employees in 2008. A 2009 statute made domestic partners of state employees ineligible for health care benefits, but a group of state employees in same-sex relationships succeeded in having a federal district court judge issue an injunction preventing the law from taking effect. The statute and that injunction were the subject of a lawsuit, Diaz v. Brewer. The Ninth Circuit Court of Appeals affirmed the injunction on September 6, 2011, and denied the defendants' request for an en banc review on April 3, 2012. The U.S. Supreme Court denied certiorari on June 27, 2013. The Ninth Circuit certified the lawsuit as a class action in December 2013, allowing the injunction to cover all similarly situated couples.

=== Local unions and partnerships ===
On June 4, 2013, the city council of Bisbee approved an ordinance legalizing civil unions for same-sex couples; it took effect 30 days later. A similar ordinance was approved in Tucson unanimously on June 19, 2013. On July 5, the first same-sex civil union was established in Bisbee. The councils of several towns and cities followed Bisbee and Tucson in adopting a civil union ordinance: Jerome on July 30, 2013, Sedona on September 24, 2013, Clarkdale on November 12, 2013, and Cottonwood on December 17, 2013. A proposal for such an ordinance failed in Camp Verde in February 2014.

The cities of Flagstaff, Phoenix, Scottsdale, Tempe, and Tucson, along with Pima County, offer domestic partnership benefits to same-sex couples. The city of Mesa recognizes the domestic partners of city employees for various benefits provided that they "have executed a domestic partner affidavit satisfactory to [the city]."

== Public opinion ==
Public opinion for same-sex marriage in Arizona
Poll source	Dates administered	Sample size	Margin of error	Support	Opposition	Don't know / refused
Public Religion Research Institute	March 9 – December 7, 2023	490 adults	± 0.82% ^{1}	69%	27%	4%
Public Religion Research Institute	March 11–December 14, 2022	?	?	70%	26%	4%
Public Religion Research Institute	March 8–November 9, 2021	?	?	69%	31%	<0.5%
Public Religion Research Institute	January 7–December 20, 2020	1,126 random telephone interviewees	?	61%	32%	7%
Public Religion Research Institute	April 5–December 23, 2017	1,444 random telephone interviewees	?	63%	28%	9%
Public Religion Research Institute	May 18, 2016–January 10, 2017	2,042 random telephone interviewees	?	62%	28%	10%
Public Religion Research Institute	April 29, 2015–January 7, 2016	1,560 random telephone interviewees	?	56%	36%	8%
Public Religion Research Institute	April 2, 2014–January 4, 2015	952 random telephone interviewees	?	58%	33%	9%
New York Times/CBS News/YouGov	September 20–October 1, 2014	2,808 likely voters	± 2.6%	47%	40%	13%
Public Policy Polling	February 28–March 2, 2014	870 voters	± 3.3%	49%	41%	10%
Rocky Mountain Poll	April 3–16, 2013	700 households	± 3.8%	55%	35%	10%
Public Policy Polling	November 17–20, 2011	500 voters	± 4.4%	44%	45%	12%
Northern Arizona University	February–March, 2004	410 residents	?	?	60%	?
Northern Arizona University	October 3–20, 2003	610 random residents	± 4%	42%	54%	4%

Notes:

- ^{1} 95% level of confidence, including the design effect for the survey of 1.56%

== See also ==
- LGBT rights in Arizona
- Same-sex marriage in the United States
- LGBT rights in the Navajo Nation
