= John Atchison =

American assistant attorney and child molester

John David Roy Atchison
- Booking photo of Atchison taken by the Macomb County Sheriff's Department
- Born: August 28, 1954; Chapel Hill, North Carolina, U.S.
- Died: October 5, 2007 (aged 53); FCI Milan, Milan, Michigan, U.S.
- Education: University of Florida; Cumberland Law School
- Occupations: Prosecutor; Assistant US Attorney
- Known for: Arrested on suspicion of soliciting sex with a 5-year-old girl; suicide by hanging in prison

John David Roy Atchison (August 28, 1954 – October 5, 2007) was an American assistant U.S. Attorney in Florida's northern district who was arrested on suspicion of soliciting sex with a 5-year-old girl. He was also a volunteer coach for girls' softball and basketball teams, and president of a youth sports association. He was arrested in a sex sting operation, and charged with "enticement of a minor to engage in sexual activity using the Internet", "aggravated sexual abuse," and "traveling across state lines to have sex with someone under the age of 12". Atchison committed suicide by hanging himself in his prison cell in Milan, Michigan, three weeks later.

== Early life and education ==
Atchison earned a bachelor's degree from the University of Florida, and a Juris Doctor degree from Samford University Cumberland Law School in Birmingham, Alabama. Early on, he lived in Pensacola, Florida.

== Career ==
Atchison was admitted to the Florida Bar in June 1984, and to the Georgia Bar in June 1985. He worked as an Assistant United States Attorney federal prosecutor in the U.S. Attorney's Office in Pensacola, Florida, in northern Florida, working primarily on tax and financial crime cases.

He was also a volunteer coach for girls’ softball and basketball teams in his hometown of Gulf Breeze, Florida, and president of a youth sports association there, the Gulf Breeze Athletic Association. In the association, girls as young as 4 could participate in a soccer program, and its programs included cheerleading, basketball, football, soccer, and softball.

== Arrest ==
On September 16, 2007, Atchison was arrested at the Detroit Metropolitan Airport in a sex crime sting operation undertaken by the FBI and the Macomb County Sheriff's Department. Authorities said that he had chatted online for two weeks with an undercover detective posing as a mother offering to let men rape her young daughter. He wrote that he wanted to have oral, vaginal, and anal sex with the girl. Atchison promised that he would not hurt the girl during sex, writing: “I’m always gentle and loving ... I’ve done it plenty." At the time of his arrest, he was carrying presents for his intended victim, including a Dora the Explorer doll and a pair of hoop earrings. Also in his possession was a jar of petroleum jelly that he planned to use in the sexual encounter.

He was charged with three felonies. They were: "enticement of a minor to engage in sexual activity using the Internet", "aggravated sexual abuse," and "traveling across state lines to have sex with a child under the age of 12".

== Suicide ==
Two weeks after his arrest, Atchison tried to kill himself by hanging himself with a bed sheet in his jail cell in the Sanilac County Jail in Sandusky, Michigan, about 75 miles north of Detroit, on September 20, 2007. Atchison had been removed from a suicide watch the previous day after assuring his lawyer and a judge that he would not harm himself. He was not injured in the suicide attempt, which another inmate reported about 4 a.m.

On October 5, 2007, Atchison committed suicide by hanging himself in his one-person prison cell in the special housing unit, for prisoners separated from the general population, of a prison in Milan, Michigan, about 36 miles southwest of Detroit, where he was on suicide watch. He was 53 years old.

== Personal life ==
Atchison was married and had three children, and he and his family lived in Gulf Breeze, Florida, near Pensacola.
