= E. Carrington Boggan =

American activist

E. Carrington Boggan (died January 20, 1992) was an American lawyer and gay rights activist. He was a founding member of civil rights organization Lambda Legal, and represented clients such as Leonard Matlovich and Vernon E. Berg in prominent gay rights cases.

== Biography ==
Boggan was a founding member and the general counsel of Lambda Legal, a civil rights organization focused on litigation on behalf of lesbian, gay, bisexual, and transgender (LGBT) people and those living with HIV and AIDS. He was also active in the American Bar Association, serving on the board of the ABA Journal and heading the Section of Individual Rights and Responsibilities, as well as the editorial board of its magazine, Human Rights.

During his career, Boggan litigated a number of prominent gay rights cases, representing clients including Leonard Matlovich and Vernon E. Berg. In the 1973 appeal of Harris L. Kimball, a lawyer disbarred after his conviction for sodomy, Boggan filed an amicus brief on behalf of the Gay Activists Alliance. In National Gay Task Force v. Board of Education, he filed an amicus brief on behalf of Lambda Legal.

Boggan died on January 20, 1992, of complications from AIDS.
