= Harris L. Kimball =

American lawyer

Harris L. Kimball was the first openly gay lawyer in the United States. He was disbarred in Florida for sodomy in 1955, but reinstated in New York in 1973.

== Biography ==
Kimball was born in 1926, and began his practice of law in Orlando, Florida in 1953. Due to rumors about his sexuality, he was targeted by a police sex sting and arrested in 1955. Kimball denied the accusations of engaging in oral sex with another man, but, after a number of hearings, was disbarred by the Florida Supreme Court in 1957 "for committing an act contrary to good morals".

After his disbarment, Kimball moved to New York and became an insurance claims adjuster, although he had trouble finding work. In 1972, he took and passed the bar exam, before applying for admission to the New York State Bar Association. Kimball argued that the 1971 case Franklin v. State had reduced sodomy from a felony to a misdemeanor in Florida, making him eligible for the New York bar.

The Character Committee, uncertain of whether Kimball could be admitted to the New York bar without first being reinstated in Florida, referred the case to the Appellate Division. On January 3, 1973, the Appellate Division rejected Kimball's application, on the grounds that sodomy remained a crime in Florida and a felony in New York. The majority opinion in the case additionally argued that Kimball's inconsistent testimony in the hearings after his 1955 arrest showed poor moral character. Kimball, represented by Jeremiah S. Gutman, appealed the decision.

On July 3, 1973, the court of appeals ruled in Kimball's favor, with Domenick L. Gabrielli writing a dissenting opinion. The majority opinion stated that:

While appellant's status and past conduct may be now and has been in the past violative of accepted norms, they are not controlling, albeit relevant, in assessing character bearing on the right to practice law in this State.

He died in 2013.
