= Arizona Proposition 207 =

Arizona Proposition 207 may refer to one of the following:

- 2006 Arizona Proposition 207, concerning compensation for property value
- 2020 Arizona Proposition 207, concerning cannabis legalization
