= Marriage Protection Amendment =

Marriage Protection Amendment may refer to:

- 2008 Arizona Proposition 102 - 2008 Arizona legislatively referred constitutional amendment
- 2008 Florida Amendment 2 - 2008 Florida initiated constitutional amendment
- Federal Marriage Amendment - Purposed amendment to the Constitution of the United States
