= Gillman v. Holmes County School District =

- Court: United States District Court for the Northern District of Florida
- Full case name: Heather Gillman, through next friend and mother, Ardena Gillman v. School Board for Holmes County, Florida
- Decided: July 24, 2008
- Docket nos.: 5:08-cv-00034
- Citation: 567 F. Supp. 2d 1359

Court membership
- Judge sitting: Richard Smoak

Keywords
- LGBT rights, schools

Gillman v. Holmes County School District, 567 F. Supp. 2d 1359 (N.D. Fla. 2008), was a decision in the Northern District of Florida which upheld a student's First Amendment right to express pro-gay sentiments at Ponce de Leon High School.

== Background ==
In early September 2007, a lesbian student at Ponce de Leon High School in Ponce de Leon, Florida, reported anti-gay harassment from fellow students to the school's principal, David Davis. The student reported that Davis told her being gay was wrong and she should not advertise her sexual orientation. To show support for the student who complained, a group of students began to write "GP," "gay pride," and other pro-gay slogans on their arms, clothing, and book binders. In response to a rumor that Davis had invited an anti-gay preacher to speak at the school, the group of students discussed walking out of the assembly in protest. When the rumored "morality assembly" did occur on September 12, 2007, no students walked out.

In the days following the assembly, Davis called in the students who were displaying pro-gay messages to ask them about their sexual orientations and instruct them not to wear rainbow belts or to write "GP" or "gay pride" on their arms or notebooks. One of the questioned students was plaintiff Heather Gillman's cousin. On Friday, September 21, 2007, and Monday, September 24, 2007, Davis suspended eleven students, including Heather's cousin, for five school days each for their involvement in exhibiting pro-gay messages. As grounds for the suspensions, Davis alleged that the students belonged to a "secret society" or "illegal organization", had threatened to walk out of a school assembly, and had disrupted the school.

To show support for her cousin, eleventh-grade student Heather Gillman wore a rainbow belt and a T-shirt that said "I support gays" to school. When she was not disciplined, she sought clarification from the School Board on its policies regarding pro-gay expression and clothing. The School Board's attorney responded that all pro-gay symbols and slogans were banned because they would "likely be disruptive and interfere with the educational process." He also alleged that such symbols represented membership in an "illegal organization."

== Decision ==
Judge Smoak found that the events at Ponce de Leon High School in September 2007 were insufficiently disruptive to justify a ban on the students' free speech and that Davis unlawfully banned the speech at issue because of his own personal viewpoint on the issue of homosexuality. The judge also found that the School Board, despite its claims, was equally at fault in the suppression of free speech, since it was aware of the dispute and failed to conduct a thorough investigation.

The judge permanently enjoined the School Board and "all... persons or entities" associated with it from restraining, prohibiting, or suppressing any student within Holmes County School District from expressing their support for the respect, equal treatment, and acceptance of gays and lesbians. The judge's order also warned the district not to retaliate against students because of the lawsuit.

== See also ==
- Henkle v. Gregory

== Other sources ==
- Associated Press: "Federal judge raps Fla. principal for treatment of gay students," July 29, 2008, accessed February 19, 2010
- Associated Press: "Fla. town backs ex-principal in campaign against gay students," August 22, 2008, accessed February 19, 2010
- WJHG: "Federal Judge Rules in Favor of Gay Rights Expression," May 13, 2008, accessed February 19, 2010
