= Diaz v. Brewer =

Lawsuit regarding healthcare benefits

- Court: United States Court of Appeals for the Ninth Circuit
- Full case name: Joseph R. Diaz, et al. v. Janice K. Brewer, Governor of Arizona, etc.
- Argued: February 14 2011
- Decided: September 6 2011
- Citation: Case No. 10-16797 (9th Cir.)

Holding
- The judgment of the District Court in issuing a preliminary injunction preventing (in part) the implementation of an Arizona statute is affirmed.

Court membership
- Judges sitting: Mary M. Schroeder; Sidney R. Thomas; Mark W. Bennett

Case opinions
- Majority: Schroeder

Laws applied
- U.S. Const. Amend. XIV

Diaz v. Brewer, originally Collins v. Brewer No. 2:09-cv-02402-JWS (Az.Dist.Ct.), is a lawsuit heard on appeal by the United States Court of Appeals for the Ninth Circuit, which affirmed a lower court's issuance of a preliminary injunction that prevented Arizona from implementing its 2009 statute that would have terminated the eligibility for healthcare benefits of any state employee's same-sex domestic partner.

== Background ==
In 2008, by administrative action, Gov. Janet Napolitano expanded the health benefits Arizona offered state employees by adding domestic partners to the category of qualified dependents. In November 2008, Arizona voters adopted an amendment to the state constitution that said: "Only a union of one man and one woman shall be valid or recognized as a marriage in this state." Governor Jan Brewer signed legislation on September 4, 2009, that redefined "dependents" as "spouses" and certain children. Its effective date was delayed until October 1, 2010, because of existing contracts with state employee unions.

== District Court ==
In November 2009, Lambda Legal filed suit in United States District Court for the District of Arizona on behalf of ten (later nine) plaintiffs, all state employees and domestic partners of a person of the same sex. The plaintiffs asked for summary judgment based on due process and equal protection claims. Lambda argued that gays and lesbians represent a class with a history of discrimination that requires the court to subject statutes that impact them to heightened scrutiny.

=== Preliminary injunction ===
In April 2010, Lambda Legal asked the court for a preliminary injunction to prevent the statute from taking effect. On July 23, 2010, U.S. District Judge John W. Sedwick issued a preliminary injunction blocking enforcement of the law with respect to same-sex couples based on the equal protection claim, while denying the due process claim. The injunction had no effect on domestic partners in different-sex relationships, who lost their eligibility when the 2009 law went into effect. Assessing the impact of the statute on the state budget, the Court cited a study presented by the plaintiffs, which defendants did not rebut, that showed that denying health benefits to same-sex partners would save the state at most $1.8 million out of its $7.8 billion annual budget.

On September 6, 2011, a unanimous three-judge panel of the Ninth Circuit Court of Appeals affirmed that the District Court had properly applied the tests required for deciding whether or not to issue a preliminary injunction. It found the statute did not meet the "more searching" form of rational basis review that is required "when a classification adversely affects unpopular groups" and a state may not provide health care "in an arbitrary or discriminatory manner that adversely affects particular groups that may be unpopular." It found that the District Court rightly rejected the state's principal justification, the impact on state expenditures, since "the savings depend upon distinguishing between homosexual and heterosexual employees, similarly situated". On April 3, 2012, the Ninth Circuit denied the defendant's request for en banc review. On July 2 the state filed a petition for a writ of certiorari asking the U.S. Supreme Court to review the case, which the Supreme Court denied on June 27, 2013.

=== Further proceedings ===
On December 23, 2013, at the plaintiffs' request and with the support of the defendants, the District Court certified the suit as a class action, expanding the beneficiaries of a decision for the plaintiffs to include all gay and lesbian state employees.
