= List of Arizona ballot propositions =

The following is a partial list of Arizona ballot propositions.

The initiative and referendum process in Arizona has been in use since Arizona attained statehood in 1912. The first initiative was passed the same year Arizona was granted statehood when on November 5, 1912, an initiative relating to women's suffrage was passed by a greater than two to one margin. The initiative process has long been a staple of Arizona politics, with 15 proposals appearing in the 1914 election, and more recently in 2006 when voters were presented with 19.

Prior to 1976, ballot propositions were not assigned a measure number. Since then, they have been identified by a 3-digit number. Ballot propositions beginning with "1" are initiatives and referendums to amend the state constitution, those beginning with "2" are initiatives to amend state statutes, and those beginning with "3" are referendums on acts to amend state statutes.

== 2020s ==
=== 2024 ===
2024 Arizona ballot propositions
No.	Description	Votes				Type
No.	Description	Yes	%	No	%	Type
133	Would require partisan primaries to be held for all partisan offices.	1,286,640	42.18	1,763,711	57.82	Legislatively referred constitutional amendment
134	Would require a certain number of signatures from each legislative district for citizen-initiated ballot measures.	1,279,574	41.98	1,768,613	58.02	Legislatively referred constitutional amendment
135	Would allow the legislature to change emergency powers granted to the Governor.	1,328,402	43.56	1,720,849	56.44	Legislatively referred constitutional amendment
136	Would allow legal challenges to ballot initiatives before one has been passed.	1,151,823	38.10	1,871,364	61.90	Legislatively referred constitutional amendment
137	Would replace county and statewide judge term limits with retention elections and judicial review.	679,824	22.33	2,364,888	77.67	Legislatively referred constitutional amendment
138	Would allow for tipped workers to be paid less than minimum wage.	792,557	25.24	2,348,023	74.76	Legislatively referred constitutional amendment
139	Would constitutionally protect the right to abortion until fetal viability.	2,000,287	61.61	1,246,202	38.39	Citizen-initiated constitutional amendment
140	Would require nonpartisan primaries and majority vote in general elections.	1,284,176	41.32	1,823,445	58.68	Citizen-initiated constitutional amendment
311	Would establish a $20 fee on every criminal conviction to go toward fire responder's families, provided they are killed in the line of duty.	2,016,450	64.17	1,126,070	35.83	Legislatively referred state statute
312	Would allow property owners to request property tax refunds if their city does not enforce certain laws.	1,804,728	58.62	1,274,031	41.38	Legislatively referred state statute
313	Would require that convicted sex traffickers serve life in prison.	2,025,608	64.54	1,112,951	35.46	Legislatively referred state statute
314	Would increase police and judge's ability to enforce border laws.	1,949,529	62.59	1,165,237	37.41	Legislatively referred state statute
315	Would prohibit rules from becoming effective if regulatory costs increase by more than $500,000 within five years.	1,383,303	46.69	1,579,549	53.31	Legislatively referred state statute
Source: Arizona Secretary of State

=== 2022 ===
2022 Arizona ballot propositions
No.	Description	Votes				Type
No.	Description	Yes	%	No	%	Type
128	Would allow the legislature to amend voter approved ballot initiatives.	859,675	36.40	1,502,368	63.60	Legislatively referred constitutional amendment
129	Limits the subjects of ballot initiatives.	1,311,046	55.23	1,062,533	44.77	Legislatively referred constitutional amendment
130	Would allow the Legislature to set certain property tax exemption amounts and qualifications.	1,478,583	63.76	840,299	36.24	Legislatively referred constitutional amendment
131	Creates the office of Lieutenant Governor.	1,299,484	55.16	1,056,433	44.84	Legislatively referred constitutional amendment
132	Would require 60% approval for tax initiatives.	1,210,702	50.72	1,176,327	49.28	Legislatively referred constitutional amendment
209	Would limit interest rates for medical debt.	1,747,363	72.01	679,089	27.99	Citizen-initiated state statute
211	Would require additional campaign finance disclosure.	1,736,496	72.34	664,111	27.66	Citizen-initiated state statute
308	Repeals Proposition 300 (2006) that banned in-state tuition for undocumented high school students.	1,250,320	51.24	1,189,877	48.76	Legislatively referred state statute
309	Would require identification when voting by mail.	1,201,181	49.62	1,219,669	50.38	Legislatively referred state statute
310	Imposes a sales tax to support fire districts.	1,144,495	48.20	1,230,042	51.80	Legislatively referred state statute
Source: Arizona Secretary of State

=== 2020 ===
2020 Arizona ballot propositions
No.	Description	Votes				Type
No.	Description	Yes	%	No	%	Type
207	Would legalize recreational cannabis.	1,956,440	60.03	1,302,458	39.97	Citizen-initiated state statute
208	Would fund public education by imposing a 3.5% tax on incomes over $250,000 (for single filers) and over $500,000 (for joint filers).	1,675,810	51.75	1,562,639	48.25	Citizen-initiated state statute
Source: Arizona Secretary of State

== 2010s ==
=== 2018 ===
2018 Arizona ballot propositions
No.	Description	Votes				Type
No.	Description	Yes	%	No	%	Type
125	Allows for adjustments to the retirement plans of corrections officers and elected officials.	1,130,219	51.72	1,055,201	48.28	Legislatively referred constitutional amendment
126	Prohibits the government from increasing taxes on services in the future.	1,436,106	64.09	804,794	35.91	Citizen-initiated constitutional amendment
127	Requires 50% of energy to come from renewable resources by 2030.	723,138	31.40	1,580,101	68.60	Citizen-initiated constitutional amendment
305	Upholds SB 1431 (2018), expanding the Empowerment Scholarship Accounts program.	790,608	35.17	1,457,070	64.83	Veto referendum
306	Designates unlawful contributions from clean election accounts and removes commission exemption from rulemaking requirements.	1,248,675	56.19	973,385	43.81	Legislatively referred state statute
Source: Arizona Secretary of State

=== 2016 ===
2016 Arizona ballot propositions (May)
No.	Description	Votes				Type
No.	Description	Yes	%	No	%	Type
123	Would increase education funding by $3.5 billion over the next ten years.	536,365	50.92	516,949	49.08	Legislatively referred constitutional amendment
124	Would adjust the Arizona Public Safety Personnel Retirement System.	719,554	70.42	302,195	29.58	Legislatively referred constitutional amendment
Source: Arizona Secretary of State

2016 Arizona ballot propositions (November)
No.	Description	Votes				Type
No.	Description	Yes	%	No	%	Type
205	Would legalize marijuana for adults older than 21 years of age.	1,233,323	48.68	1,300,344	51.32	Citizen-initiated state statute
206	Would increase the minimum wage and introduce paid sick leave.	1,465,639	58.33	1,046,945	41.67	Citizen-initiated state statute
Source: Arizona Secretary of State

=== 2014 ===
2014 Arizona ballot propositions
No.	Description	Votes				Type
No.	Description	Yes	%	No	%	Type
122	Permits the state to refuse to participate in federal activities deemed unconstitutional.	707,451	51.24	673,337	48.76	Legislatively referred constitutional amendment
303	Allows drug and medical device manufacturers to make products available to terminally ill patients that have completed phase one of a clinical trial.	1,111,850	78.47	304,971	21.53	Legislatively referred state statute
304	Increases legislative salaries from $24,000 to $35,000 per year.	457,216	32.11	966,605	67.89	Commission referred state statute
Source: Arizona Secretary of State

=== 2012 ===
2012 Arizona ballot propositions
No.	Description	Votes				Type
No.	Description	Yes	%	No	%	Type
114	Prohibits felony crime victims from having to pay damages.	1,664,473	79.95	417,431	20.05	Legislatively referred constitutional amendment
115	Increases term lengths and retirement age for the judiciary and requires superior courts to publish decisions online.	553,132	27.66	1,446,970	72.34	Legislatively referred constitutional amendment
116	Establishes the tax exemption amount for business equipment to be equal to the combined earnings of 50 workers.	852,981	43.92	1,089,294	56.08	Legislatively referred constitutional amendment
117	Sets a 5% annual cap on increases in property values used to determine property taxes and establish a single limited property value as the basis for calculating all property taxes on real property.	1,132,766	56.67	866,249	43.33	Legislatively referred constitutional amendment
118	Adjusts the distribution formula for the State Land Trust Permanent Endowment Fund.	950,938	50.52	931,238	49.48	Legislatively referred constitutional amendment
119	Authorizes the exchange of state trust lands for protecting military facilities or improving land management.	1,194,594	61.94	733,907	38.06	Legislatively referred constitutional amendment
120	Declares Arizona's sovereignty over public lands and all natural resources within its boundaries, excluding Indian reservations, federal property, or land ceded by the state.	623,461	32.27	1,308,299	67.73	Legislatively referred constitutional amendment
121	Establishes a top-two system for primary elections.	662,366	33.07	1,340,286	66.93	Citizen-initiated constitutional amendment
204	Permanently increases the state sales tax by one cent per dollar.	768,422	36.22	1,353,212	63.78	Citizen-initiated state statute
Source: Arizona Secretary of State

=== 2010 ===
2010 Arizona ballot proposition (May special)
No.	Description	Votes				Type
No.	Description	Yes	%	No	%	Type
100	Temporarily increases the state sales tax by one cent per dollar for three years.	750,850	64.32	416,571	35.68	Legislatively referred constitutional amendment
Source: Arizona Secretary of State

2010 Arizona ballot propositions (November)
No.	Description	Votes				Type
No.	Description	Yes	%	No	%	Type
106	Prohibits mandating participation in any health care system and also prohibits fines for not participating.	892,693	55.28	722,300	44.72	Legislatively referred constitutional amendment
107	Prohibits preferential treatment to or discrimination against any person/group on the basis of race, sex, color, ethnicity, or national origin in employment.	952,086	59.51	647,713	40.49	Legislatively referred constitutional amendment
109	Provides a constitutional right to hunt, fish, and harvest wildlife in Arizona.	714,144	43.52	926,991	56.48	Legislatively referred constitutional amendment
110	Authorizes the sale or lease of state lands without public auction in order to protect military operations.	792,394	49.71	801,670	50.29	Legislatively referred constitutional amendment
111	Renames the position of Secretary of State to Lieutenant Governor.	655,252	40.77	951,820	59.23	Legislatively referred constitutional amendment
112	Changes the initiative filing deadline from four months to six months before the general election.	792,697	49.99	792,825	50.01	Legislatively referred constitutional amendment
113	Provides the right to vote on a secret ballot in regard to employee representation.	978,109	60.46	639,692	39.54	Legislatively referred constitutional amendment
203	Protects terminally or seriously ill patients from state prosecution for using limited amounts of marijuana on doctor's recommendation.	841,348	50.13	837,008	49.87	Citizen-initiated state statute
301	Transfers remaining money from a land-conservation fund to the general fund.	416,323	25.99	1,185,461	74.01	Legislatively referred state statute
302	Terminates the Arizona Early Childhood Development and Health Board and associated programs.	492,060	30.10	1,142,744	69.90	Legislatively referred state statute
Source: Arizona Secretary of State

== 2000s ==
=== 2008 ===
November 4, 2008 General election
Prop. num.	Description	Result	YES votes	NO votes	Type
100	Amendment to the constitution to prohibit the creation of any state level tax on the sale or transfer of real property.	Yes	1,355,494	407,722	
101	Proposed amendment to the constitution to guarantee the freedom of choice regarding health care providers and system.	No	1,048,510	1,057,197	
102	Amendment to the constitution defining marriage as being between a man and a woman only.	Yes	1,039,606	801,279	
105	Proposed amendment to the constitution to prevent the subsequent passage of any initiative measure imposing additional taxes or spending, except when approved by a majority of all qualified voters, turnout notwithstanding.	No	595,638	1,142,732	
200	Proposal to reform the payday loan industry with several pro-consumer changes including reduced rate limits, no-cost repayment options and borrowing caps on consumers. Proposal would extend existing exemptions for payday loan industry regarding maximum interest rates.	No	710,087	1,042,413	
201	Proposal to create a homeowners' "Bill of Rights", mandating certain rights for the purchasers of new homes including a guaranteed ten-year warranty, right to demand correction of construction mistakes and the right to participate in the selection of contractors to enact repairs.	No	386,281	1,359,743	
202	Proposition 202 changes current Arizona law that prohibits employers from intentionally or knowingly employing an alien who is not authorized under federal law to work in the United States. Under Proposition 202, the definition of "knowingly employ an unauthorized alien" would be changed to require actual knowledge by an owner or officer of the employer.	No	725,963	1,048,966	
300	Referred proposal to increase the salaries of state legislators to $30,000.	No	630,676	1,147,956	

=== 2006 ===
Shaded entries indicate citizen initiatives and referendums. Full text of each proposition is available here.

Prop. num.	Passed	YES votes	NO votes	Description
100	Yes	1,170,961	332,461	Proposed amendment to the constitution to deny bail to persons charged with serious felonies who are in the US illegally. proposed statute
101	Yes	736,169	715,154	Proposed amendment to the constitution to modify the method in which cities, towns, counties and educational districts calculate property tax levies. proposed statute
102	Yes	1,102,237	382,714	Proposed amendment to the constitution to deny the award of punitive damages in civil court cases to persons who are in the US illegally. proposed statute
103	Yes	1,114,273	391,497	Proposed amendment to the constitution to declare English the official language of the state. proposed statute
104	Yes	849,097	580,639	Proposed amendment to the constitution to allow cities and towns to take on more debt for the maintenance of transportation infrastructure and basic city services. proposed statute
105	No	410,106	1,020,807	Proposed amendment to the constitution to create up to 400,000 acres (1,600 km^{2}) of non-urban trust land for conservation in exchange for the sale of trust land designated as urban. proposed statute
106	No	701,646	739,540	Proposed amendment to the constitution to allow the creation of 694,000 acres (2,810 km^{2}) of trust land for conservation while permitting the conveyance of other state lands without auction. proposed statute
107	No	721,489	775,498	'Protect Marriage Arizona' - Proposed amendment to the constitution to define marriage as being between a man and a woman and prohibiting the creation of a legal status similar to marriage for unmarried persons. proposed statute
200	No	496,641	991,284	'Arizona Voter Reward Act' proposing the creation of a $1,000,000 reward in a random lottery to promote voter participation. proposed statute
201	Yes	828,685	684,711	'Smoke-Free Arizona Act' proposing a ban on smoking in all public places and places of employment while exempting private residences, tobacco stores, designated smoking rooms in hotels/motels, veterans/fraternal clubs, Native American religious ceremonies and outdoor patios. proposed statute
202	Yes	987,347	523,070	Proposal to increase the state minimum wage to $6.75. proposed statute
203	Yes	793,312	698,286	Proposal to establish an early childhood development program funded through an increase on state tobacco taxes. proposed statute
204	Yes	926,913	569,190	'Humane Treatment of Animals Act' proposing to ban certain confining of pigs or calves. proposed statute
205	No	431,879	1,060,467	'Your Right to Vote by Mail Act' proposing a requirement that a mail-in ballot be distributed to every registered voter and all elections be conducted via mail. proposed statute
206	No	640,851	861,440	'Arizona Non-Smoker Protection Act' proposing to ban smoking in public places and places of employment except bars that prohibit minors and have separate ventilation systems, private residences, tobacco stores, designated hotel/motel rooms, veterans and fraternal clubs, Native American religious ceremonies, and outdoor patios. proposed statute
207	Yes	955,533	519,161	'Private Property Rights Protection Act' proposing to establish additional rights for individuals whose property is taken through eminent domain; also prohibiting the taking of property for economic development. proposed statute
300	Yes	1,060,444	423,994	Referendum on a proposal to require citizenship for eligibility for various subsidized services such as in-state tuition and financial assistance. proposed statute
301	Yes	856,591	620,549	Referendum on a proposal to make ineligible for mandatory probation persons convicted of offenses involving the use of methamphetamines. proposed statute
302	No	707,861	774,928	Referendum on a proposal to increase state legislators' salaries. proposed statute

=== 2004 ===
Shaded entries indicate citizen initiatives and referendums.

Prop. num.	Passed	YES votes	NO votes	Description
100	No	818,497	892,654	Would have amended the constitution to allow for the exchange of state trust lands with other public lands. Substantially similar to Proposition 101 of 2002.
101	Yes	894,807	726,167	Amended the constitution to require all subsequent ballot initiatives and referendums specify a new source of revenue for any required expenditure.
102	No	792,277	853,632	Would have amended the constitution to allow the state to license or transfer any technology or intellectual property created within the state university system in exchange for ownership interests or securities in the acquiring company.
103	Yes	896,706	767,253	Amended the constitution to require that any temporary appointments to the office of Justice of the Peace have the same qualifications as a permanent candidate for the office.
104	No	536,410	1,147,169	Would have amended the constitution to move the filing deadline for ballot initiatives from 4 months prior to the election, to 7 months. Petitions would still be allowed to circulate for 20 months prior to the deadline.
105	Yes	1,046,048	638,620	Amended the constitution to add 2 positions to the State Board of Education.
200	Yes	1,041,741	830,467	Requires that voters be able to produce both identification and proof of citizenship prior to being allowed to vote in any election. The same requirements were also enacted for any person prior to receiving any state or locally funded benefits.
300	No	699,575	1,076,494	Would have raised the salary of state legislators from $24,000 to $36,000.

=== 2002 ===
Shaded entries indicate citizen initiatives and referendums.

Prop. num.	Passed	YES votes	NO votes	Description
100	No	479,702	659,378	Would have amended the constitution to allow counties, cities and towns to incur additional amounts of debt for the construction of transportation infrastructure.
101	No	558,658	577,462	Would have amended the constitution to allow the state to exchange state trust lands for other public lands, provided the exchange was for land of equal or greater value and conservation of lands was maintained.
102	Yes	907,410	221,281	Amended the constitution to clarify the income requirements pertaining to a section of the constitution allowing senior citizens to freeze their property values with regard to property taxation. This amendment clarified changes enacted by Proposition 104 of 2000.
103	Yes	924,161	224,709	Amended the constitution to add to the list of crimes for which certain accused offenders could not qualify for bail. The amendment added sexual assault, sexual conduct with a minor under 15, and molestation of a minor under 15. Previous wording in the constitution listed capital offenses and felonies under other specific circumstances.
104	Yes	758,695	323,626	Amended the constitution to exempt certain sources of funding from an existing expenditure limit on public school districts. Specifically, revenues earned through a sales tax enacted by Proposition 301 of 2000, as well as Proposition 300 of 2002, were exempted from this restriction.
200	No	173,126	995,686	Would have directed the Governor to enter into revised gaming compacts with any of the native tribes that request a new compact.
201	No	234,935	947,341	Would have directed the Governor to enter into revised gaming compacts with any tribe upon request. This proposition would have also modified existing state law to allow for the use of slot machines on horse and dog racing facilities.
202	Yes	610,900	590,064	Directed the Governor to enter into revised gaming compacts with any of the native tribes that request a new compact. This proposition differed from Proposition 200 in its allocation of the state's share of gaming revenues as well as imposing additional limits on the location of gaming facilities.
203	No	504,607	678,446	Would have decriminalized the possession and use of small quantities of marijuana. The proposal would also have required the state to supply 2 ounces of medical grade marijuana to certain seriously or terminally ill patients.
300	Yes	855,687	274,316	Redirected certain budgetary surpluses from the state land trust program to education. The statute specified that these funds were to be in addition to, rather than a replacement for, funding of education from other sources.
301	Yes	845,072	317,246	Extended the expiration date of the state lottery program from 2003 to 2012.
302	Yes	803,354	348,369	Allowed first time offenders of personal drug use or possession to be eligible for treatment and probation in lieu of incarceration except in cases where other drug related crimes have been committed.
303	Yes	791,295	389,619	Increased the tax rate on cigarettes and other tobacco products by over 100%, while maintaining the current laws regarding the expenditure of the revenues from the sale of tobacco products.
304	No	361,902	771,271	Would have increased the salary for state legislators from $24,000 to $36,000.

=== 2000 ===
Shaded entries indicate citizen initiatives and referendums.

Prop. num.	Passed	YES votes	NO votes	Description
100	No	669,630	706,518	Would have amended the constitution by making several changes dealing with state trust lands. Among the changes would be the conservation of up to 270,000 acres (1,100 km^{2}) as protected lands, the ability to transfer trust lands to school districts without compensation, and change the manner in which lands are sold or transferred.
101	Yes	886,774	546,439	Amended the constitution to update the language with regard to disabilities. The amendment also updated the language to stipulate 18 as the minimum age to vote in line with the US Constitution, as well as dispensing of a one-year residency requirement.
102	No	538,104	896,500	Would have amended the constitution to require subsequent ballot initiatives relating to the taking of wildlife on public lands be passed with a two-thirds majority to take effect.
103	Yes	743,284	659,748	Amended the constitution to expand the Corporation Commission from three to five members, reduce the length of a term from six to four years, and increase the term limit from one to two terms.
104	Yes	906,395	513,825	Amended the constitution to allow property owners over the age of 65 to request that their property valuations for taxation purposes be frozen and immune to increase, provided the property is their primary place of residence.
105	Yes	975,869	450,971	Amended the constitution to exempt cemeteries from property taxation.
106	Yes	784,272	612,686	Amended the constitution to establish the Citizens' Independent Redistricting Commission to draw legislative and congressional district boundaries. Prior wording held the state legislature responsible for redrawing boundaries in accordance with the decennial census.
108	No	281,017	1,152,998	Would have amended the constitution to deregulate telephone companies in markets where significant competition exists. Existing language stipulates that the Corporation Commission is responsible for setting rates.
200	Yes	837,557	605,094	Would have set into law the method of disbursing and spending the approximately $3.2 billion the state anticipated to collect as part of the Tobacco Master Settlement Agreement. Targeted for the funds include education aimed at the prevention of tobacco use among minors as well as health care. While this proposition passed, it received fewer votes than competing measure Proposition 204 and was thus not enacted into law.
202	No	436,345	1,027,674	Would have enacted a comprehensive reform of growth management, including the requirement for cities and towns with a population of 2500 or greater to adopt growth management plans, prohibiting development beyond identified urban growth regions. The proposition would have also enacted numerous changes to county and municipal zoning procedures.
203	Yes	925,415	542,942	Requires all public school instruction to be given in the English language, except students designated as "English Learners" who would be placed in an intensive English immersion program.
204	Yes	903,134	532,317	Sets into law the method of disbursing and spending the approximately $3.2 billion the state anticipated to collect as part of the Tobacco Master Settlement Agreement. Targets for the funds include education aimed at the prevention of tobacco use among minors as well as health care. Substantially similar to Proposition 200. As this proposition received more votes, it supersedes the provisions of Proposition 200.
300	No	521,603	922,462	Would have increased the salaries of legislators from $24,000 to $30,000.
301	Yes	778,807	675,941	Enacts a sales tax increase of 0.6% for 20 years for the purpose of funding education.

== 1990s ==
=== 1998 ===
Prop. num.	Passed	YES votes	NO votes	Description
100	Yes	570,271	358,449	Amended the constitution to add rules to the public retirement system used in the state, applying to various public employees including teachers, law enforcement officers, firefighters, judges, elected officials and other government employees. Among the new rules are a constitutional guarantee that retirement benefits not be reduced or impaired.
101	No	338,030	602,185	Would have amended the constitution to rename the Commission on Salaries for Elective State Officers to the Arizona Citizens Commission on Salaries for Elective State Officers and increase its membership from 5 to 11. The amendment would have changed the method in which the salaries for state officials, except the legislature, are set.
102	Yes	488,711	427,665	Amended the constitution to allow the state to invest a portion of its trust funds into stocks. Previous wording restricted the investment of state trust funds into interest-bearing equities such as savings accounts and bonds.
103	Yes	576,466	375,832	Amended the constitution to allow voters registered under a minor party or those not declaring party preference to vote in the primary election of the party of their choice. The amendment did not change the requirement that a voter registered under a party holding its own primary must vote in that election.
104	No	417,926	502,946	Would have amended the constitution with regard to approved ballot measures. The amendment would have prevented the Governor from vetoing any approved measure, and would have prevented the Legislature from repealing any measure for five years. The amendment would also have required a 2/3 vote by the Legislature to amend any approved ballot measure. Proposition 104 was in competition with Proposition 105.
105	Yes	476,770	435,520	Amended the constitution with regard to approved ballot measures. The wording of the amendment prevents the Governor from vetoing any approved measure, and prevents the Legislature from repealing any measure indefinitely. The amendment also requires a 3/4 vote by the Legislature to amend any approved ballot measure. Proposition 105 was in competition with Proposition 104.
200	Yes	481,963	459,373	Established the Citizens Clean Election Commission, to provide for campaign reform via public funding to candidates who agree to certain spending limits in their campaign.
201	Yes	666,058	312,368	Banned cockfighting and made the possession of cocks with intent to fight, participation in cockfighting, or allowing cockfighting to take place on one's property a felony.
202	No	409,133	499,896	Would have allowed candidates to federal offices to take up a voluntary pledge to eliminate the Internal Revenue Service. Participating candidates would have a note designating their participation next to their name on applicable ballots.
300	No	418,303	562,091	Would have restricted the prescription of controlled substances to those that received approval of the United States Congress or the Food and Drug Administration. This was a referendum on laws enacted by Proposition 200 of 1996.
301	No	464,776	494,520	Would have allowed those convicted of a crime involving the possession or use of controlled substances to qualify for parole on their first or second violations, mandating drug treatment or education. This was a referendum on laws enacted by Proposition 200 of 1996.
302	Yes	544,969	421,627	Increased the salaries of state legislators from $15,000 to $24,000.
303	Yes	501,358	446,598	Set aside $20 million annually for the purchase or lease of state trust lands, for the purpose of preservation from development.
304	Yes	652,479	324,514	Extended the termination date of the state lottery program from 1999 to 2003.

=== 1996 ===
Prop. num.	Passed	YES votes	NO votes	Description
100	No	520,450	752,145	Would have amended the state constitution to allow the state legislature to specify an effective date for certain types of legislation, including emergency laws, monetary appropriations and tax increases. Existing wording states these types of laws become effective immediately upon being signed by the Governor.
101	Yes	664,231	625,314	Amended the constitution to allow the legislature to pass laws granting partial exemptions on property taxes to properties used for agriculture or enterprise.
102	Yes	844,922	496,720	Amended the constitution to specify that juveniles aged 15 and older who are accused of murder, rape, armed robbery or other violent crimes, or who are otherwise chronic offenders, be prosecuted as adults. The amendment also allows county attorneys to establish community based alternatives in the cases of less serious crimes.
200	Yes	872,235	461,332	Created new state laws regarding controlled substances. Among the new laws are rules stipulating that persons convicted of violent crimes while under the influence of a controlled substance serve 100% of their sentence without parole and allow for the prescribing of controlled substances in certain medical cases.
201	Yes	858,903	484,554	Modified state law to compel the state to enter into gaming compacts with any tribes who had not already negotiated a compact with the state to date, on request of the tribe.
203	Yes	940,588	365,548	Modified state laws to allocate a $17 million of revenues gathered from the state lottery system to health and welfare. Eligibility requirements for state funded health care were also relaxed.
300	No	412,585	614,626	Would have increased the salary for state legislators from $15,000 to $24,000.

=== 1994 ===
Shaded entries indicate citizen initiatives and referendums.

Prop. num.	Passed	YES votes	NO votes	Description
100	No	375,336	705,766	Would have amended the constitution to create the office of Lieutenant Governor of Arizona for the purpose of succession in the case of a permanent vacancy of the office of Governor, and to act as Governor during a temporary absence. The proposed wording would have stipulated the office be held by a member of the same party as the Governor and run for office on a joint ticket.
101	No	432,616	630,955	Would have amended the constitution to allow state trust lands to be exchanged for other publicly or privately held lands, provided the lands were of equal value and the purpose of the exchange was to consolidate state lands or to acquire land for public purposes. Substantially similar to Proposition 102 in 1992, which was rejected.
102	Yes	552,028	515,611	Amended the constitution to exempt animals used primarily for agricultural purposes from being taxed as property.
103	No	431,846	663,313	Would have amended the constitution to allow for the passage of laws restricting the right of a person to sue for damages due to injury or death, and would allow for the passage of laws restricting the amounts recoverable as damages in such cases. Existing wording prohibits the passage of any laws restricting these rights.
200	Yes	565,096	547,189	Increased the state tax rates on cigarettes and other tobacco products. The majority (70%) of the revenue generated by the tax increase was designated for health care for low-income families. 23% was designated as funding for educational programs aimed at the reduction in the use of tobacco.
201	Yes	635,277	450,581	Amended state laws regarding the taking of wildlife to prohibit certain methods of capture, prohibiting the use of leghold traps, snares and poisons. The prohibition does not apply to wildlife control or the trapping of non fur-bearing rodents. Substantially similar to Proposition 200 in 1992.
300	No	412,585	614,626	Would have created additional rules and procedures involving the taking of private property for public interests.
301	No	404,231	646,407	Would have created numerous new rules regarding civil claims.
302	No	428,324	655,174	Would have raised the salary for state legislatures from $15,000 to $19,750.

=== 1992 ===
Prop. num.	Passed	YES votes	NO votes	Description
100	Yes	927,913	455,712	Amended the constitution to allow a plurality of votes for state executive offices to be sufficient. Previous wording required a runoff election in the event no candidate received a majority of the votes.
101	Yes	745,091	615,306	Amended the constitution to change the length of the term of the office of State Mine Inspector from a two-year term to a four-year term.
102	No	631,737	720,650	Would have amended the constitution to allow state trust lands to be exchanged for other publicly or privately held lands, provided the lands were of equal value and the purpose of the exchange was to consolidate state lands or to acquire land for public purposes.
103	Yes	1,040,535	314,919	Amended the constitution to require subsequent death sentences in Arizona to be carried out by lethal injection rather than cyanide gas. Inmates already sentenced to death prior to the amendment would be given a choice in the method of execution.
104	Yes	732,030	601,700	Amended the constitution to allow municipal and county governments to request an adjustment to their maximum budgetary spending during all general elections. Previous wording restricted votes on the matter to certain local election events.
105	Yes	701,036	865,289	Amended the constitution to allow counties with a population of 500,000 and greater to establish a charter form of government and to enact local ordinances. Previous wording in the constitution required counties to seek ordinances via the state legislature.
106	No	701,036	865,289	Would have amended the constitution to allow elementary school districts to incur a debt load equal to 20% of the value of the district's taxable properties. Existing wording limits the debt load to 15%.
107	Yes	1,026,830	356,799	Amended the constitution to enact term limits on various offices. A limit of 4 terms was placed on state legislative offices and the office of State Mine Inspector, a limit of 2 terms was placed on state executive offices, and a limit of 1 term on corporation commission members. The amendment also effectively limited United States Senators to 2 terms and United States Representatives to 3 terms by restricting ballot access; a subsequent US Supreme Court case ruled such state level restrictions as unenforceable.
108	Yes	975,191	381,777	Amended the constitution to require a two-thirds vote by the State Legislature when passing any legislation increasing state revenues through a change in tax allocation, such as an increase in taxation levels or a reduction in credits and exemptions.
109	Yes	738,655	537,475	Amended the constitution to provide for increased public participation in the nomination and evaluation of judges in Maricopa and Pima Counties. The amendment requires public hearings and votes to be held prior to the nomination of any supreme court, court of appeals or superior court judges in these counties.
110	No	447,654	975,251	Would have amended the constitution to prohibit abortions except in cases of rape, incest, or when deemed necessary to the life of the mother. The amendment would have also provided for court-appointed representation to protect the rights of unborn children.
200	No	545,977	889,722	Would have created state laws to prohibit the use of certain methods of taking wildlife in the state of Arizona. The prohibition would have included the use of snares and leghold traps, as well as lethal methods including poisons, explosives, flammable and pyrotechnic devices. The prohibition would not have applied to the legal use of firearms in hunting, nor would it have applied to non-lethal use of the above means for wildlife study andmanagement.
300	Yes	880,488	555,189	Combined the observance of Lincoln's and Washington's birthdays into a single President's Day, and established the observance of Martin Luther King Day as an official state holiday.
301	No	488,271	911,025	Would have increased the salary for state legislatures from $15,000 to $19,748.

=== 1990 ===
Shaded entries indicate citizen initiatives and referendums.

Prop. num.	Passed	YES votes	NO votes	Description
100	No	466,089	567,267	Proposed constitutional amendment regarding state school and trust lands. Would allow for the exchange of state trust lands with private or other public lands.
101	No	401,165	622,210	Proposed constitutional amendment regarding public debt and taxation. Would change the allowed purposes a city or town may incur debt.
102	Yes	543,966	473,111	Proposed constitutional amendment regarding the judicial department. Would prescribe the jurisdiction for justice of the peace courts.
103	No	354,733	687,977	Proposed constitutional amendment regarding education. Would establish a "classroom improvement program" through additional funding for schools, and requiring core goals be met by school districts.
104	Yes	589,870	443,930	Proposed constitutional amendment regarding victims' rights. Provides victims of crimes with additional rights regarding the prosecution of criminals.
105	No	180,922	865,289	Proposed constitutional amendment compensation for motor vehicle accidents.
200	Yes	648,046	394,952	Proposal to allow funding from the Arizona State Lottery for the use of the State Parks program and the Game and Fish Department for preservation.
201	No	231,266	820,653	Proposal to create a state insurance board and create broad regulations regarding automobile insurance.
202	No	346,926	691,580	Proposal to alter state statutes regarding waste disposal, including groundwater monitoring.
203	No	156,301	892,794	Proposal to alter statutes regarding automobile insurance.
300	No	337,868	699,589	Referendum to increase the salaries for elected state officials.
301	No	251,308	768,763	Referendum on an act to create a state holiday for Martin Luther King, Jr. Day.
302	No	517,882	535,151	Referendum on an act to restore Columbus Day as a state holiday, and create a state holiday for Martin Luther King, Jr. Day/Civil Rights Day.

== 1912 to 1990 ==
=== 1988 ===
- Proposition 106, establishing English as the official state language passes by a narrow 50.5 to 49.5 margin. Later overturned by the Arizona Supreme Court as unconstitutional in 1998.

The Arizona Constitution, Article XXVIII: Section 2. The official language of the state of Arizona is English. Section 3. A. Representatives of government in this state shall preserve, protect and enhance the role of English as the official language of the government of Arizona. Section 3. B. A person shall not be discriminated against or penalized in any way because the person uses or attempts to use English in public or private communication.

Section 4. Official actions shall be conducted in English.

Section 5. Rules of construction, clarifies that The constitution does not "prohibit" other communication. Section 1.notes the law does not apply to: (a) The teaching of or the encouragement of learning languages other than English. (b) Actions required under the federal individuals with disabilities education act or other federal laws. (c) Actions, documents or policies necessary for tourism, commerce or international trade. (d) Actions or documents that protect the public health and safety, including law enforcement and emergency services. (e) Actions that protect the rights of victims of crimes or criminal defendants. (f) Using terms of art or phrases from languages other than English. (g) Using or preserving Native American languages. (h) Providing assistance to hearing impaired or illiterate persons. (i) Informal and nonbinding translations or communications among or between representatives of government and other persons if this activity does not affect or impair supervision, management, conduct or execution of official actions and if the representatives of government make clear that these translations or communications are unofficial and are not binding on this state or a political subdivision of this state. (j) Actions necessary to preserve the right to petition for the redress of grievances.

=== 1980 ===
- Proposition 200, providing for a state lottery passes by a narrow 51 to 49 margin. Lottery History

=== 1968 ===
- Proposition 104, changed the term of office for Governor, Secretary of State, State Treasurer, Attorney General, and Superintendent of Public Instruction from two years to four effective with the terms beginning in January 1971.

=== 1946 ===
- Dual initiatives establishing Arizona as a Right-to-work state pass.

=== 1916 ===
- Initiative to abolish the death penalty passes. A similar initiative failed in 1914. Repealed by another initiative in 1918.

=== 1914 ===
- Constitutional amendment protecting citizen initiative from veto power as well as exempting them from repeal by the state legislature.

=== 1912 ===
- Initiative to grant universal suffrage to women passes by a 2 to 1 margin. Arizona's first ballot measure.

== See also ==
- Timeline of women's suffrage in Arizona
- Women's suffrage in Arizona
