= Thomas Stoddard =

American lawyer and gay rights activist

- Born: Thomas Byron Stoddard; 1949; Seattle, Washington
- Died: February 12, 1997 (aged 47–48); Manhattan, New York
- Occupation: Lawyer
- Known for: Gay rights activism

Thomas B. Stoddard (1949 – February 12, 1997) was an American lawyer and gay rights activist. He was the executive director of Lambda Legal Defense and Education Fund from 1986 to 1992. He also served as an adjunct professor at New York University School of Law beginning in 1981.

== Activism ==
In addition to his work opposing discrimination against homosexuals, Stoddard was active in opposing discrimination against people with HIV/AIDS. He wrote a bill prohibiting discrimination against homosexuals in public accommodations that was passed by the New York City Council, and subsequently signed into law by New York City Mayor Ed Koch, in 1986; Koch later referred to the bill as "perfect".

He served as the director of the Campaign for Military Service, which publicly met with President Bill Clinton in 1993 in the hopes of persuading him to end the policy of prohibiting homosexuals from serving in the United States armed forces.

== Personal life ==
Stoddard was born in Seattle, Washington and grew up in New York City. He attended Georgetown University and New York University School of Law, graduating from the latter in 1977.

Stoddard had a wedding ceremony with Walter Rieman in 1993, where the two men exchanged gold wedding rings from Tiffany's. Stoddard and Rieman were subsequently designated "domestic partners" in New York City.

Stoddard learned that he had Kaposi's sarcoma, an AIDS-related cancer, in 1989. He died of AIDS on February 12, 1997, at his home in Manhattan, New York.
