= Arizona ballot proposition =

Proposed laws presented to voters for approval

A ballot proposition in the state of Arizona refers to any legislation brought before the voters of the state for approval.

In common usage, the term generally applies to the method of amending either the state constitution or statutes through popular initiative, although it may also refer to any legislation referred to the public by the state legislature. Most ballot propositions in the latter context are the end result of the normal legislative process regarding amendments to the state constitution. Occasionally the legislature may choose to refer bills of a statutory nature to the voting public, as well.

== Origins ==
The first instance of a modern US initiative and referral system appeared in Oregon in 1902. This in itself was a product of the governmental reforms that were a signature of the Progressive Era, which sought to reduce corruption and inefficiency. A strong sentiment that current political systems were cumbersome and slow lead to the popularization of the idea of direct democracy. Citizen initiative became highly popular in newly forming governments and thus is widespread in the Western United States.

Itself a product of the Progressive Era reforms, the constitution adopted by Arizona upon admission to the Union in 1912 reflects the sentiment that direct democracy was sacred. The first section of the constitution dealing with the powers of the Legislature is quick to reserve the rights of initiative and referendum for the people. These rights are also granted specific protections, being exempt from veto by the governor as well as not being subject to repeal by the legislature. Citizen initiatives may only be overturned by subsequent initiatives.

== Process ==
=== Initiative ===
Initiative is the process wherein either the state statutes or the state constitution is amended through citizen action. This process begins when qualified voters (electors) submit a petition outlining the proposed amendment to the Secretary of State. This petition must then be signed by 10% of the registered voters who actually voted in the most recent gubernatorial election for statutory amendments; this percentage increases to 15% for constitutional amendments. If enough signatures are obtained the initiative will appear on the subsequent general election ballot for voter approval. A 50% majority is required for a ballot proposal to pass and become law.

=== Referendum ===
Referendum is the process wherein current legislation is referred to the voting public for approval. The legislature may choose to refer any legislation; however, any bills proposing an amendment to the state constitution must be subject to referendum. As with an initiative, only a 50% vote is required to enact the legislation.

A referendum on any pending legislation may also be forced by the public in a similar manner to any initiative, requiring a petition signed by no less than 5% of the registered voters. To ensure enough time for any potential referendum, no legislation that is passed may take effect for at least 90 days.

The constitution makes provisions for the passage of emergency legislation that is not subject to referendum. Such legislation must pertain to the peace, safety or health of the population, or to ensure the continued function of the state government in emergency situations. Such legislation must pass with a 2/3 majority in both houses as opposed to a simple majority.

== Criticisms ==
As with the citizen initiative process in general, the ballot initiative process in Arizona has been subject to a number of criticisms. Concern that the initiative process is subject to overuse and abuse has increased significantly. In 2006 there were a record 19 initiatives on the general ballot, creating concern that voters could become confused or simply fatigued by the numerous choices. This has led to legislators considering steps to limit or otherwise exert more control over the initiative process. Paradoxically, any attempt to alter the initiative and referendum process would require an amendment to the state constitution, and thus in itself be put forth as a referendum.

The extensive use of the initiative process in Arizona is nothing new, however. In the 1914 elections, a total of 15 initiatives were presented to Arizona voters.

== See also ==
- List of Arizona ballot propositions
