= John Richard Smoak Jr. =

American judge (1943–2022)

Senior Judge of the United States District Court for the Northern District of Florida
- In office December 31, 2015 – May 2, 2022

Judge of the United States District Court for the Northern District of Florida
- In office November 3, 2005 – December 31, 2015
- Appointed by: George W. Bush
- Preceded by: Roger Vinson
- Succeeded by: T. Kent Wetherell II

Personal details
- Born: May 11, 1943 Columbus, Georgia, U.S.
- Died: May 2, 2022 (aged 78) Panama City, Florida, U.S.
- Education: United States Military Academy (BS); University of Florida (JD)

Military service
- Allegiance: United States
- Branch/service: United States Army
- Years of service: 1965–1970

John Richard Smoak Jr. (May 11, 1943 – May 2, 2022) was a United States district judge of the United States District Court for the Northern District of Florida.

== Biography ==
Smoak was born in 1943, in Columbus, Georgia. He received his Bachelor of Science from the United States Military Academy in 1965 and served in the United States Army from 1965 to 1970. He received his Juris Doctor from the University of Florida College of Law in 1972. He was in private practice in Florida from 1973 to 2005.

== Federal judicial service ==
Smoak was nominated to the United States District Court for the Northern District of Florida by President George W. Bush on June 8, 2005, to the seat vacated by C. Roger Vinson. He was confirmed by the Senate on October 27, 2005, and received his commission on November 3, 2005. He assumed senior status on December 31, 2015. He died on May 2, 2022.

== Rulings on free speech ==
In 2008 in Gillman v. Holmes County School District Smoak ruled that students of public school have the right to wear gay pride T-shirts and pins. This ruling came after a Florida principal suspended many students for wearing such items. Smoak also ordered the school to notify, in writing, all high school and middle school students that they possess this right.

In Brayshaw v. City of Tallahassee, Fla. Smoak struck down a Florida statute which made it a crime to "publish or disseminate the residence address or telephone number of any law enforcement officer while designating the officer as such..." Brayshaw had posted the name of a Tallahassee police officer, along with her home address, cell phone number and age on the page RateMyCop.com, and also criticized the officer, stating that she was verbally abusive, rude and unprofessional. Brayshaw challenged the constitutionality of the Florida statute, claiming a right to free speech under the First Amendment. On April 30, 2010, Judge Smoak struck down the 1972 Florida law, finding that the statute was "unconstitutional on its face".

== Reassignment of cases ==
On May 29, 2015, all of Smoak's cases were reassigned to other judges by an administrative order issued by Chief Judge M. Casey Rodgers.

Legal offices
Preceded by Roger Vinson	Judge of the United States District Court for the Northern District of Florida; 2005–2015	Succeeded by T. Kent Wetherell II
