= Henkle v. Gregory =

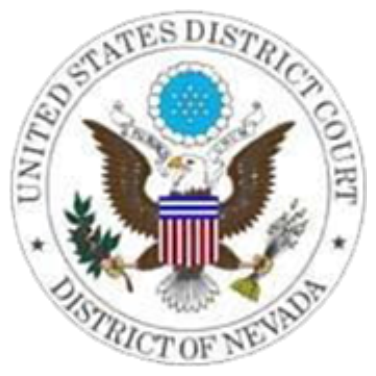
- Court: United States District Court for the District of Nevada
- Full case name: Derek R. Henkle v. Ross Gregory, in his official and individual capacity, Denise Hausauer, Loretta Rende, Joe Anastasio, Robert Floyd, Serena Robb, Arnel Ramilo, and Glen Selby, in their individual capacities; and the Washoe County School District, a political subdivision of the State of Nevada
- Docket nos.: 3:00-cv-00050
- Citation: 150 F. Supp. 2d 1067

Case history
- Subsequent actions: Settled out of court for $451,000 and eighteen changes to district policy

Court membership
- Judge sitting: United States Magistrate Judge Robert A. McQuaid Jr..

Keywords
- bullying, sexual orientation, Title IX

Henkle v. Gregory, 150 F. Supp. 2d 1067 (D. Nev. 2001), was a federal lawsuit that ended in a 2002 agreement in which the Washoe County School District (Nevada) agreed to implement policies to support openly gay and lesbian students and to pay the plaintiff, a student who had complained of harassment and inaction on the part of school officials, $451,000 in damages. The plaintiff's attorneys called it "the largest pre-trial award of its kind in history".

== Background ==
Derek R. Henkle was born in 1983 in Denver, Colorado.

While a student at Galena High School, Henkle began attending a gay and lesbian support group at the University of Nevada, Reno. During the course of a meeting in the fall of 1995 that was filmed by a local cable program, Set Free, he discussed his homosexuality. Fellow high school students learned of his admission, repeatedly called him names, and once lassoed him and threatened to drag him with their pickup truck. His report of the incident to the assistant principal was met with laughter. After further harassment, Henkle asked to be transferred to Wooster High School. His request was granted, but at both schools he was told he was being allowed to transfer on condition that he "keep his sexuality to himself". The principal at Wooster told him to "stop acting like a fag". Harassment continued there and then at a third, Washoe High School, where police officers failed to respond when Henkle was repeatedly punched in the face. The school district enrolled him in a continuing education program at a local community college, though he was too young to qualify to take the high school equivalency examination.

At one point during his high school years, he read an article in OUT magazine about Jamie Nabozny, a Wisconsin high school student who successfully sued his school district for failing to protect him from verbal and physical abuse. As he contemplated a lawsuit of his own, he discussed the process with James Dale, the Eagle Scout who fought his exclusion from a leadership position with the Boy Scouts on account of his homosexuality.

== Lawsuit ==
Magistrate Judge Robert A. McQuaid Jr.

Title IX, part of a federal civil rights statute enacted as part of the Education Amendments of 1972, prohibits sex discrimination. In 1997, the Office of Civil Rights released updated guidelines for Title IX that included for the first time the need to protect gay and lesbian students from harassment and sexually hostile environments. In 1999, the Supreme Court decision in David v. Monroe County Board of Education established that school officials could be held liable for failing to protect students from harassment by their peers. In September 2000, Lambda Legal, after a preliminary victory in a U.S. District Court, reached a settlement with a California school district that won a student-organized gay-straight alliance (GSA) the right to meet at school. The plaintiff in a harassment suit would have to prove that school officials were aware of the harassment and responded unreasonably or with deliberate indifference and that the nature and extent of the harassment deprived the student of an education.

Henkle, represented by Lambda Legal Defense and Education Fund (now Lambda Legal) and O'Melveny & Myers, filed suit in U.S. District Court in January 2000 against Washoe County School District. The complaint named three high school principals, a vice principal, a student services director, a teacher, and two county police officers. He sought compensatory and punitive damages as well as an order directing the school district to award him a high school diploma.

The district moved to dismiss the case, Derek Henkle v. Ross Gregory et al. On March 1, 2001 Magistrate Judge Robert A. McQuaid, Jr., dismissed some but not all of Henkle's claims and allowed Henkle to seek punitive damages. The case was scheduled to go to trial in November 2002.

== Agreement ==
The parties to the case settled on August 28, 2002, with the district agreeing to make a number of policy changes and to pay $451,000 in damages. Henkle's attorneys described the settlement as "the first in the country to recognize the constitutional right of gay and lesbian youth to be open about their sexual orientation in schools and to be protected from discrimination and harassment by other students." School officials said the policies were designed to prevent the development of "an intimidating, hostile or offensive school environment."

The school district's policies addressed a range of student behaviors covered by freedom of expression, including participation in school activities, publications, and elections. They identified as impermissible any behaviors that "cause a substantial disruption of or material interference with school activities" or are "vulgar, lewd, obscene or plainly offensive."

The school district committed in the agreement that it would establish programs that:

Acknowledge that students' freedom of expression includes the right to discuss their sexual orientation, and issues related to orientation, at school.

Require regular student education about harassment and sexual harassment and intimidation.

Require regular training of all staff regarding the prevention of and proper response to harassment and intimidation.

Require posting of the policy and implementing regulations in all district buildings and in student handbooks.

Erwin Chemerinsky, professor of law at the University of Southern California, said: "It is possible there have been unpublished settlements on gay rights between individual plaintiffs and school districts elsewhere in the country, but this is public, and that makes it more influential."

The agreement called for Henkle to use $92,453 of the $451,000 awarded him to cover costs incurred by his attorneys, whose services were largely performed on a pro bono basis.

The parties agreed to make no further claims based on the events described in the complaint. The school district admitted no fault. Its communications director said: "The message has gone out to our administrators and staff: Any kid, gay or straight, rich or poor, black or white ... who sets foot on our school has a right to be treated with dignity, respect and free of harassment. Schools should be safe havens for all kids." The district released a statement that said: "Our settlement with Mr. Henkle is in no way an admission of guilt or wrondoing by any of the parties named as defendants. The facts in this case are still very much in dispute. We believe our employees acted responsibly and professionally. In front of a jury we feel our witnesses would have been persuasive and that we likely would have won, but given the huge amounts of money at stake, it was a risk that we were unwilling to take."

At a press conference following the announcement of the agreement, Henkle said: "It's great to be standing here this morning. There were times in my childhood when I wasn't sure I would make it." He added: "My experience might sound extreme, but it's a daily reality for kids across the country." Henkle, who had obtained his high school equivalency diploma while waiting for the resolution of his lawsuit, announced plans to use the settlement money to attend American University in Washington, D.C. He also said that the school district had "acted quickly and appropriately including the suspension of some students" when it learned Henkle was being harassed.

In a press release issued to announce the agreement, one of Henkle's attorneys said: "Lesbian and gay students are coming out at younger ages. This settlement provides the first real blueprint for how schools can meet their legal obligations as this trend continues." While an agreement like that reached in the case creates no precedent, he believed the settlement showed all school districts that failure to protect all students exposed them to serious financial risks. Another of the attorneys told Good Morning America: "The important thing is for schools to know that if they bash you and allow you to be bashed, they will pay. Eighty-four percent of homosexual high school students report being harassed on a regular basis. Teachers and administrators all across America have a responsibility to protect all of their students."

== Aftermath ==
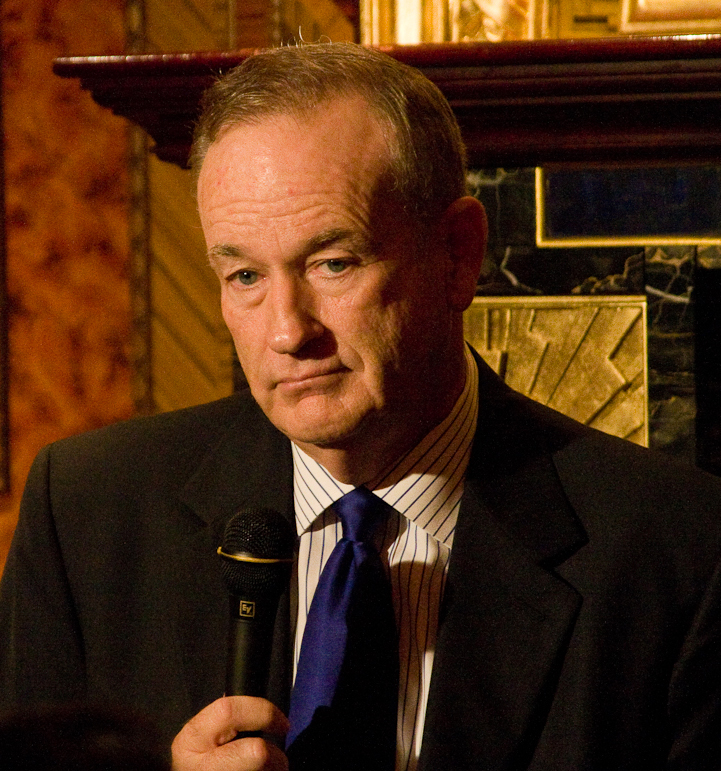
In a 2002 interview with Henkle, Bill O'Reilly advised gays and lesbians to avoid discussing their sexuality as Henkle had, warning that "It's not going to be good for you."

Henkle publicized his case in a series of appearances that included the Today Show, Good Morning America, and NBC Nightly News. During a September 23 interview on the O'Reilly Report, Bill O'Reilly used Henkle's case to advise gay and lesbians not to follow his example: "And I have to tell you, Mr. Henkle, I mean, we don't want any American ever to be tortured or harassed by anyone, but I am going to say again: Do not define your sexuality out there, you guys or girls listening, in any way. It's not going to be good for you." He told Henkle: "I'm asking you to shut up about sex."

When a Frontline interviewer later asked Henkle if he saw himself as an activist he replied: "I've been preparing for it my whole life. I got an immense education in ignorance through my high schools. That definitely prepared me for a long, hard struggle in life. It's great today, because I can be safe in my household. I can be safe in life. I can be safe in my job even, because I work for a company that is very accepting. I do a lot of non-profit work, which allows me to be very free and very liberated to go out there and do that. Not everybody has that benefit."

He attended American University, spending a summer as an intern at Good Morning America. He graduated in 2007 with a B.A. in international political media, and has worked in various capacities as a video journalist with major news organizations including Voice of America and Associated Press.

In 2009, the Washoe County School District agreed to pay $350,000 to Jana Elhifny, an Egyptian-American female student who claimed she had been harassed for being a Muslim and wearing a headscarf. It also paid $50,000 to a non-Muslim female student who was ostracized by other students after she befriended Elhifny. The district praised its personnel for their "professional and thorough handling of [Elhifny's] educational and personal issues". Her attorney disagreed and said: "I don't believe a district pays $400,000 if it believes it has no exposure."

== See also ==
- Gillman v. Holmes County School District

== Sources ==
- Merjian, Armen H. (2009). "Henkle v. Gregory: A Landmark Struggle against Student Gay Bashing" (PDF). Cardozo Journal of Law & Gender. Yeshiva University: 41–64. Archived from the original (PDF) on March 29, 2014.
