= 2006 Arizona Proposition 107 =

Failed referendum on a statewide same-sex marriage ban

Arizona Proposition 107 (2006)
- November 7, 2006
- Arizona Marriage Amendment

Results
Choice	Votes	%
Yes	721,789	48.21%
No	775,498	51.79%
Valid votes	1,497,287	96.41%
Invalid or blank votes	55,745	3.59%
Total votes	1,553,032	100.00%
Registered voters/turnout	2,568,401	58.28%
County results
Yes
60–70%
50–60%
No
50–60%

Arizona Proposition 107 was a proposed same-sex marriage ban, put before voters by ballot initiative in the 2006 general election. If passed, it would have prohibited the U.S. state of Arizona from recognizing same-sex marriages or civil unions. The state already had a statute defining marriage as the union of a man and a woman and prohibiting the recognition of same-sex marriages performed elsewhere.

This proposed amendment to the Arizona Constitution failed, with 48.2% voting in favor and 51.8% opposed, making Arizona the first U.S. state to defeat a state constitutional amendment banning same-sex marriage. Several states approved similar measures between 1998 and 2006.

The proposition was backed by the Protect Marriage Arizona coalition, which included the Center for Arizona Policy and United Families Arizona. The proposition was primarily opposed by the Arizona Together coalition, which included the Arizona Human Rights Fund and the Human Rights Campaign.

Voters approved a more limited constitutional amendment which banned same-sex marriage but not state-recognized civil unions or domestic partnerships, 2008 Arizona Proposition 102, in 2008 with 56% of the vote.

== Official title and text ==
An Initiative Measure

Proposing an amendment to the Constitution of Arizona; amending the Constitution of Arizona; by adding Article XXX; relating to the protection of marriage

To preserve and protect marriage in this state, only a union between one man and one woman shall be valid or recognized as a marriage by this state or its political subdivisions and no legal status for unmarried persons shall be created or recognized by this state or its political subdivisions that is similar to that of marriage.

== Electoral results ==
=== Statewide ===
Proposition 107
Choice	Votes	%
For	721,789	48.21
Against	775,498	51.79
Total	1,497,287	100.00

=== By county ===
County	Yes	No
Apache County	50% (8,661)	50% (8,740)
Cochise County	56% (19,422)	44% (15,490)
Coconino County	40% (15,139)	60% (22,279)
Gila County	52% (8,526)	48% (7,775)
Graham County	69% (5,221)	31% (2,369)
Greenlee County	57% (1,151)	43% (885)
La Paz County	52% (1,921)	48% (1,772)
Maricopa County	48% (421,568)	52% (449,065)
Mohave County	57% (25,429)	43% (19,254)
Navajo County	56% (14,194)	44% (11,246)
Pima County	42% (115,915)	58% (158,721)
Pinal County	52% (28,873)	48% (26,882)
Santa Cruz County	45% (3,473)	55% (4,204)
Yavapai County	52% (36,992)	48% (34,346)
Yuma County	55% (15,004)	45% (12,470)
Total	48% (721,489)	52% (775,498)

== Pre-decision opinion polls ==
Date of opinion poll	Conducted by	Sample size	In favor	Against	Undecided	Margin	Margin of Error	Source
October 2006	Social Research Lab for Northern Arizona University	?	51%	42%	?	9% pro	?	
October 2006	Arizona State University / KAET-TV	?	30%	56%	?	26% con	?	
October 7–8, 2006	Harstad Strategic Research	?	41%	48%	11%	7% con	?	

== See also ==
- List of Arizona Ballot Propositions
- 2008 Arizona Proposition 102
- LGBT rights in Arizona
