= 2006 Arizona Proposition 207 =

Ballot measure on eminent domain

Arizona Proposition 207 (2006)
- November 7, 2006
- Private Property Rights Protection

Results
Choice	Votes	%
Yes	955,533	64.80%
No	519,161	35.20%
Total votes	1,474,694	100.00%
County results
For
70–80%
60–70%
50–60%

Arizona Proposition 207, a 2006 ballot initiative officially titled the Private Property Rights Protection Act, requires the government to reimburse land owners when regulations result in a decrease in the property's value, and also prevents government from exercising eminent domain on behalf of a private party. It was approved by a 64.8% margin. The land use portion of this proposition is similar to Oregon's 2004 Ballot Measure 37, and the eminent domain portion is similar to initiatives advanced in numerous states following the 2005 US Supreme Court decision in Kelo v. City of New London.

== The Private Property Rights Protection Act ==
Proposition 207, which was officially titled the “Private Property Rights Protection Act,” has been codified at Ariz. Rev. Stat. section 12–1134. The Act provides that “[i]f the existing rights to use, divide, sell or possess private real property are reduced by...any land use law enacted after the date the property is transferred to the owner and such action reduces the fair market value of the property the owner is entitled to just compensation[.]” Landowners are entitled to compensation only if the challenged regulation continues to apply to their property 90 days after filing a claim, allowing the government to grant waivers in lieu of compensation. The Act specifically declares that waivers run with the land and are not personal to the owners that first obtain them.

The Act exempts the following categories of regulation from the compensation/waiver requirement: (1) laws intended to protect the public health and safety (e.g. building codes, health and sanitation laws, transportation and traffic control, solid and hazardous waste regulations, and pollution controls); (2) law that “[l]imit or prohibit the use or division of real property commonly and historically recognized as a public nuisance under common law”; (3) regulations required under federal law; (4) regulations of adult businesses, housing for sex offenders, liquor, and other undesirable uses; (5) laws necessary to establish locations for utility facilities; (6) laws that “[d]o not directly regulate an owner’s land”; and (7) laws enacted before Proposition 207.

Although opponents to Proposition 207 argued that the law would result in many lawsuits, few have been brought.

== Supporters ==
The campaign for Proposition 207 was funded almost entirely from outside the state of Arizona, through groups run by New York libertarian and real estate developer Howie Rich.

Advocates of Proposition 207 said it prevents the government from taking private property for third-party private development merely to increase tax revenue, and ensures just compensation for property owners in public use takings and when governmental regulation devalues property.

The Goldwater Institute claims credit for developing the policy proposal.

== Opponents ==
Opponents to Proposition 207 said the measure would limit the ability of the state, counties, cities and towns to implement land use regulations that might have the impact of reducing property values. Large landowners and corporations could demand huge payouts from state and local taxpayers just by claiming a law has harmed the value of their property or business, no matter how important the law may be or how far-fetched the claim.

== See also ==
- List of Arizona ballot propositions
