= RateMyCop.com =

Defunct review site

RateMyCop

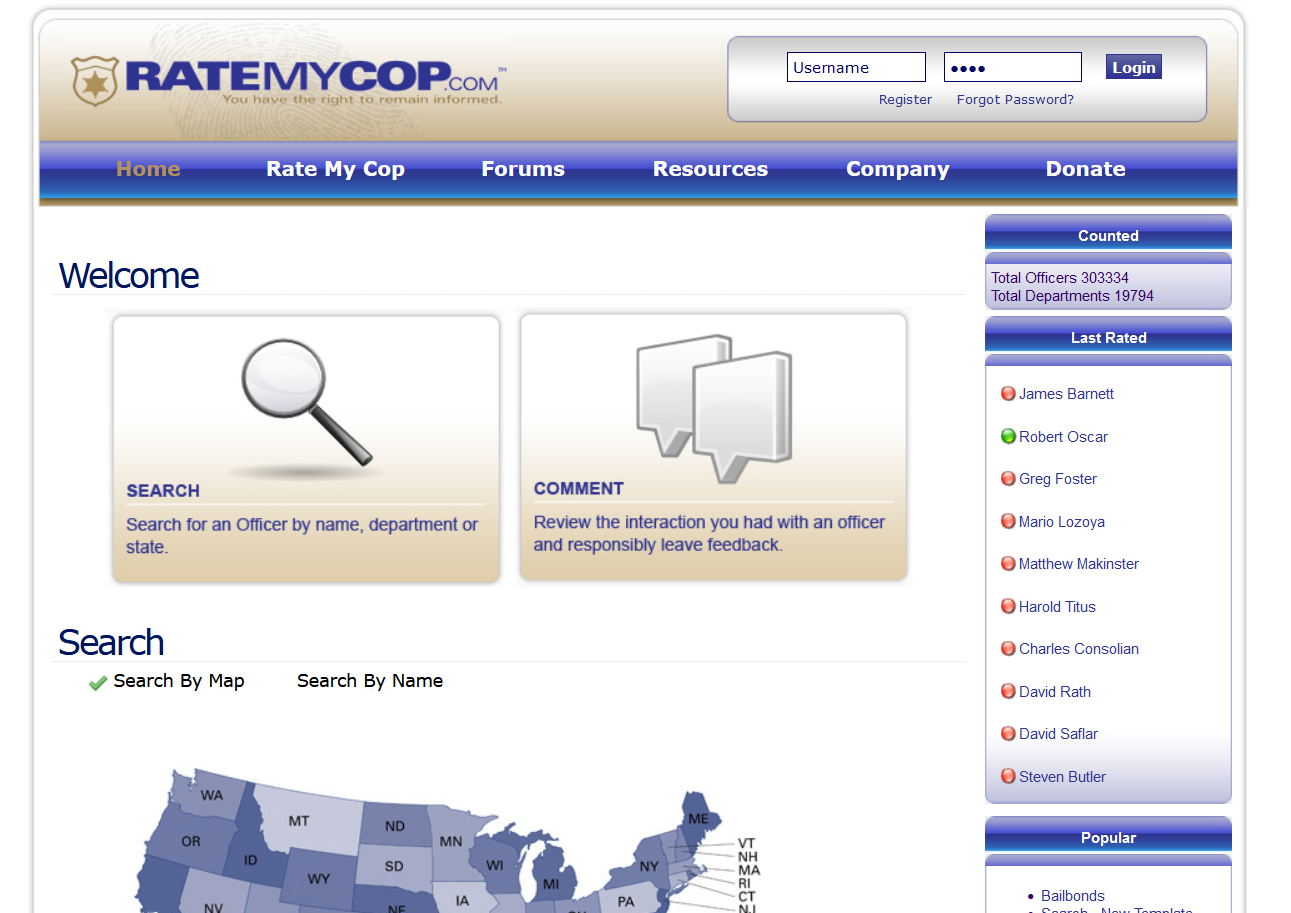
- Screenshot The homepage of RateMyCop on March 17, 2017
- Creators: Gino Sesto; Rebecca Costell
- Website: ratemycop.com (defunct)
- Registration: Optional
- Launched: February 28, 2008; 18 years ago
- Current status: Shut down

RateMyCop.com (also stylized RATEMYCOP.com) was a review site that allowed users to give feedback on police officers in the United States. The website contained info on over 300,000 officers obtained through public records, which could be searched through by name, state, or department, in addition to allowing users to comment on and rate officers in regards to professionalism, fairness, and overall satisfaction. The website was started in February 2008 by Gino Sesto and Rebecca Costell, who were inspired by other websites that allowed users to rate their teachers or doctors. The website faced several challenges in its history, including its legality being challenged in the Utah State Senate, losing its domain hosts twice, and a user being arrested for posting on the website.

The website received mixed to negative reception from police officers and their associates, hinging on the danger it could have posed to officers in duty, the possibility of personal information being posted on the website, and the lack of personal accountability for what was posted. Other officers remained unconcerned with it, or even wanted to use it or similar websites as tools for communication with the public. RateMyCop.com has been frequently cited as an example of how Web 2.0 technologies like social computing could affect the transparency of services provided by governments.

== History ==
RateMyCop.com started out as an internet forum for discussing police officers and departments in 2007, but inspired by websites that allowed users to rate their teachers or doctors, the couple Gino Sesto and Rebecca Costell changed the site's purpose to rating police on February 28, 2008. Sesto said he got the idea from a dinner conversation he had with a friend, where they discussed their experiences with police officers, but realized there was no place to share their experiences online. Based out of Culver City, California, they started sending letters to thousands of police and sheriff's departments in the United States in September 2007 to gather information for their database. Co-founder Costell stated that the website was not "anti-cop", and was created to invite better accountability for police officers. They decided to forego including the police department of their local city, stating in a phone interview that "If something were to happen, if we need to call the Culver City Police Department and they showed up an hour later... I wouldn't want to put them under the microscope. I wouldn't want to put us under the microscope". Their friend Crys Spelman ran public relations; she stated that they created the website to "open up dialogue" between opponents and supporters of law enforcement agencies. Close to the site's launch, it had the names of over 140,000 police officers from more than 500 police departments in the United States. The site is no longer operational, but was last archived on the Internet Archive on March 17, 2017, by which point there were over 300,000 officers from nearly 20,000 departments in their database.

=== Utah State Senate bill ===
Before the website's official launch on February 28, 2008, a bill was proposed in the Utah State Senate with the goal of allowing police to withhold misconduct reports from the public. This was prompted by RateMyCop.com's requests for misconduct reports on every police officer in every agency in the state. It was sponsored by Republican politician Chris Buttars, who claimed the bill would only encompass non-criminal reports. Buttars later regretted sponsoring the bill, asking his colleagues in the senate to vote against the bill. He commented that he wanted the bill to "conceal disciplinary actions" if the officer in question had been acquitted, which was contrary to the sweeping protections it provided for all records of misdeeds committed by them.

=== Domain hosting issues ===
On March 11, 2008, GoDaddy shut down RateMyCop.com without prior notice after complaints from police officers. After being contacted about the shutdown, GoDaddy responded that it was due to "suspicious activity". However, the owner of the site was later told by GoDaddy that the site was shut down for reaching its 3 terabyte bandwidth limit, but Sesto doubted this explanation, as the site had only 80,000 connected users that day and 400,000 the previous day.

A day later, the web-hosting service Rackspace began hosting the website, before being shortly removed because it "could create a risk to the health and safety of law enforcement officers", said Rackspace's senior corporate counsel Beth Sherfy. They soon found a third domain host, which Sesto would not identify.

=== Prosecution of user under Florida law ===
In 2007, Florida resident Robert Brayshaw was investigated by Tallahassee police officer Annette Garrett for trespassing. No charges were pursued, but Brayshaw found her conduct to be unprofessional, and over several weeks in 2008, posted critical comments and personal information about her on RateMyCop.com that were usually not covered on the website, including her home address, personal website, marital status, cell phone number and personal e-mail address. He was arrested and prosecuted in 2008 by the state attorney under a 1972 statute that made it illegal to publish the personal information of a police officer. The case was dismissed by the state in December 2008, but the state attorney filed again less than two weeks later. The charges were conclusively dismissed in April 2009 because they violated Florida's speedy trial law.

Brayshaw subsequently sued the city of Tallahassee and the state attorney in September 2009 with the assistance of the American Civil Liberties Union of Florida to have the statute declared unconstitutional, and to be paid damages for his arrest. Federal judge Richard Smoak ruled in favor of Brayshaw, and on April 30, 2010, struck down the statute that made it a crime to publish police officers' addresses and phone numbers to intimidate, hinder or interfere with their duties, because he deemed it to be in violation of the right to free speech. Brayshaw received US$60,000 (equivalent to $89,000 in 2025) in damages and legal fees, $25,000 of which was ordered to be given in legal expenses by the city of Tallahassee for his false arrest.

== Content ==
RateMyCop.com allowed for registered users to search for officers by their name, department, or state, in addition to allowing users to provide anonymous comments and ratings (Note: The scale of the rating system ranged from zero to five stars.) in regards to the officers' professionalism, fairness, and overall satisfaction. The amount of ratings that any given officer could receive weekly was limited to prevent abuse. The information on the officers were obtained through public records, and the founders of the website claimed that it did not disclose private information, only what is "available on an everyday traffic ticket". The site did not feature undercover police in their database. Comments on the website were moderated, with threats being removed. According to Costell, serious threats were reported to police.

== Reception ==
Less than a month after its inception in February 2008, the website was receiving 100,000 visitors a day. Site founder Sesto estimated at the time that "at least half" of the website's userbase were police officers.

RateMyCop.com received mostly negative reception from law enforcement. Kevin Martin of the San Francisco Police Officers Association worried that users of the website would have access to officers' personal information, like home addresses or personal phone numbers. Jerry Dyer, president of California Police Chiefs Associations, criticized the website for allowing police officers to "face unfair maligning without any opportunity to defend themselves". He noted that the organization would work with other law enforcement organizations to stop the website from operating. Similarly, citing that the website puts officers in danger, vice president of the Latino Police Officers Association, Hector Basurto, also wanted to see the website gone.

Other police officers remained unconcerned with the content of the website. Ruben Vasquez, president of the Saginaw police officers union, commented on the lack of verification associated with anonymous reports on the website, and said that they have "more serious things to be concerned with", like the safety of the city and its citizens. Similarly, Mike Tellef, speaking on behalf of the Peoria police department, explained that they would use the website as a tool and that they welcome the feedback: "We have an obligation to ensure that the services that we're providing to the public are the utmost and the best that we can give them for their taxpayer dollar".

Salt Lake City police chief Chris Burbank said the website did not raise any privacy concerns for him, and that he wanted the department to start a similar feedback forum on their website. Hillsborough County Sheriff's Office spokesperson Larry McKinnon said that the department did not take the website seriously, and that they did not use it for internal affairs issues, as they were already giving out forms for people in the community to provide feedback. Another spokesperson for the department, Andrea Davis, noted that anonymous feedback was not used for rating the performance of their officers.

Fiorella de Cindio and Cristian Peraboni at the University of Milan commented on the possible danger of RateMyCop.com and similar websites in regard to their lack of accountability concerning comments provided by anonymous individuals. They suggested that civic accountability could be effective when citizens assumed their actual identities in online communities. Pasco County Sheriff's spokesperson Kevin Doll named a similar concern: "You know nothing about the people posting those comments and that in itself is a danger". Writing for The Times, Sathnam Sanghera called the website a "truly dangerous idea" and a "recipe for disaster", after commenting that the police are exposed to the "criminally insane" more often than others are. On the talk show The O'Reilly Factor, host Bill O'Reilly reflected on the website's lack of verifiability in regard to user comments, calling it dangerous.

Jacqui Cheng of Ars Technica also commented on the website's potential for abuse, but that it could be likely to skew the other way too; she noted that among the top rated officers, one user had left five-star reviews across the entire country. She also thought the police's privacy concerns to be unfounded, as the information posted on the website would have already been public, and would have been protected by free speech laws. Her first comments on potential abuse were mirrored by University of Southern California law professor Thomas D. Griffith, remarking that "unconfirmed reports that can be over-praising or condemning is not the best way to ensure accountability".

== Legacy ==
RateMyCop.com has been among the most frequently cited examples of review site initiatives to provide citizens with the ability to provide feedback to public services provided by governments. It has been cited by Ed Downey, associate professor at The College at Brockport, as an example of a larger trend enabled by Web 2.0 technologies to assess the quality of civil servants. He further noted that sites like it suggest a strong possibility of change in the power dynamic between experts and users. Similarly, the website has also been given as an example of "social reporting" that allows the people within a given community to gather information and comments for collective assessment of the quality of public officials. Researchers at the Joint Research Centre proposed that social computing on websites like RateMyCop.com has led to the "increased transparency of government institutions, their services and their employees", in addition to enabling greater "accountability of the public sector and governance systems".

The website helped inspire the Landman Report Card, a tool for landowners to grade landmen (i.e. oil and gas industry representatives) that they have negotiated mineral rights with.

== See also ==
- Rate My Professors
