= Jeremiah S. Gutman =

American civil rights lawyer (died 2004)

Jeremiah S. Gutman (c. 1924 – February 25, 2004) was an American civil rights lawyer and founding member of the New York Civil Liberties Union.

== Biography ==
Gutman served in World War II as a corporal in the 2nd platoon, Company G of the 273rd Infantry Regiment in the 69th Infantry Division, receiving a Purple Heart. During the 1948 Palestine war, he collected light arms to smuggle to the Haganah.

As a student at the New York University School of Law, Gutman edited the New York University Law Review. In 1949, he joined the law firm Levy, Gutman, Goldberg & Kaplan, where his father was a partner. In 1951, hoping to combat McCarthyism, Gutman became a founding member of the New York Civil Liberties Union.

Over the course of his career, Gutman litigated many civil rights cases, with prominent clients including Abbie Hoffman, Douglas Faneuil, Jerry Rubin, and conscientious objectors to the Vietnam War. He also defended cult leaders such as Sun Myung Moon and leaders of the Hare Krishna movement; sociologist Stjepan Meštrović described Gutman as "sympathetic to cult movements, express[ing] regret that the First Amendment is not applied vigorously to defend them, and refer[ring] to 'deprogramming' as a 'dirty business'".

In 2001, Gutman became the chair of the National Coalition Against Censorship, where he had served as an officer since the 1980s. He became president of Meretz USA in the same year. Gutman died from a heart attack on February 25, 2004.
