= Lambda Legal =

American LGBT civil rights organization

Lambda Legal Defense and Education Fund
- Formation: 1973; 53 years ago
- Type: NPO
- Legal status: 501(c)(3)
- Purpose: LGBTI (lesbian, gay, bisexual, transgender and intersex) civil rights
- Headquarters: New York City, United States
- Chairman: John F. Stafstrom
- Website: lambdalegal.org

The Lambda Legal Defense and Education Fund, better known as Lambda Legal, is an American civil rights organization that focuses on lesbian, gay, bisexual, and transgender (LGBTQ) communities as well as people living with HIV/AIDS (PWAs) through impact litigation, societal education, and public policy work.

Kevin M. Cathcart is the current chairman of the organization.

== History ==
Lambda's founder William J. Thom, Esq. submitted incorporation papers for approval to the New York Courts in 1971, but his application was denied on the grounds that its proposed activities would be "neither benevolent nor charitable in purpose" and "there was no demonstrated need for its existence". That decision was overturned in 1973 by the New York Court of Appeals, which is the highest court of New York State. (In re Thom, 301 N.E.2d 542 (N.Y. 1973).)

In 1973, a group of gay lawyers formed the Lambda Legal Defense and Education Fund, with the help and support of prominent heterosexual lawyers. They drafted legislation protecting gay people from housing and employment discrimination.

The original incorporators, in addition to Bill Thom, were E. Carrington Boggan, and Michael J. Lavery. At their first meeting on November 10, 1973, they were elected to the newly constituted board of directors namely Rodney L. Eubanks, Shepherd Raimi, and D. Nicholas Russo.

Because of the scarcity of openly gay lawyers in 1973, Lambda Legal formed a Board of Advisors of prominent New Yorkers sympathetic to the cause of gay rights. They included US Congressperson Bella Abzug, New York State Senator Carol Bellamy, Association of the Bar President Merrell E. Clark, Rev. John Corn of Trinity Church and Martin Duberman, Distinguished Professor at City University of New York. Also on the Board of Advisors were the two lawyers who later became New York State Supreme Court Justices: Phyllis Gangel-Jacob and Shirley Fingerhood.

By the 1980s, with the crisis of the AIDS epidemic getting more attention, awareness of gay activism had grown significantly. Thomas B. Stoddard, who was executive director from 1986 to 1992, helped to author a bill passed in 1986 by the New York City Council to protect queer people against bias in housing, employment, and public accommodations. Mayor Ed Koch, who signed the bill enacting it into law said: "The legislation drafted by Tom Stoddard was perfect." In 1993, Stoddard and other nationally known gay leaders met with President Bill Clinton, first such delegation to meet inside the Oval Office.

In 2013, Lambda Legal – Midwest Regional Office was inducted into the Chicago Gay and Lesbian Hall of Fame.

Its national headquarters remained in New York City, but today it has regional offices in Atlanta, Chicago, Dallas, Los Angeles, and Washington.

== Work ==
Lambda Legal has played a role in many legal cases pertaining to gay rights, including the 6–3 United States Supreme Court's 2003 decision in Lawrence v. Texas, which invalidated sodomy laws in the United States.

Lambda Legal maintains a national network of volunteer cooperating attorneys.

Lambda Legal pursues litigation in all parts of the country, in every area of the law that affects communities they represent, such as discrimination in employment, housing, public accommodations, and the military; HIV/AIDS-related discrimination and public policy issues; parenting and relationship issues; equal marriage rights; equal employment and domestic partnership benefits; "sodomy" law challenges; immigration issues; anti-gay initiatives; and free speech and equal protection rights.

Before taking on legal work on behalf of same-sex marriage rights, Lambda Legal had to resolve an internal debate over the significance of marriage for its constituency and the strategic wisdom of taking on the issue. In 1990, it declined to represent the plaintiffs in the initial challenge to Hawaii's denial of marriage licenses to same-sex couples. It filed an amicus brief in that case at a later stage and another in Dean v. District of Columbia, its first advocacy for same-sex marriage.

In 1996, Jennifer C. Pizer (also known as Jenny Pizer) joined the staff of Lambda Legal. In 2022, Pizer was named Chief Legal Officer. Pizer co-counseled the litigation that legalized marriage between same-sex couples in California on May 15, 2008, in re Marriage Cases. On August 18 of that same year, Pizer won a unanimous California Supreme Court victory in N. Coast Women's Care Med. v. S.C on behalf of Guadalupe T. Benitez, a lesbian denied infertility due to the discriminatory religious objections brought forth by her doctor.

In July 2012, Lambda founder Bill Thom was interviewed at his nursing home in Manhattan, and gave a first-hand account of the early years of Lambda Legal. This resulted in a letter from the current co-chair of Lambda Legal to Bill Thom dated September 25, 2012, in which he thanked Thom for his contribution to the LGBT community.

Represented by Lambda Legal, Immigration Equality and law firm Morgan Lewis & Bockius, in October 2020, the United States Department of State withdrew its appeal of the verdict in Kiviti v. Pompeo, and declined to appeal Mize-Gregg v. Pompeo. Federal district courts ruled the State Department's refusal to recognize children born overseas to married same-sex, American citizen couples as U.S. citizens to be unlawful in both cases.

Following a 2017 Trump administration presidential order to ban transgender troops from the US military, Lambda indicated that they would be taking action to challenge the legality of the order. The order was blocked by courts until the Supreme Court allowed it to go into effect in January 2019, but was reversed two years later by executive order of President Biden, less than a week after his inauguration in January 2021.

In 2019, attorney Shelly Skeen joined Lambda Legal's South Central Regional Office in Dallas. She later became South Central Regional Director and, as a Lambda senior attorney represented plaintiffs in litigation challenging Texas investigations of families seeking gender-affirming care for transgender youth.

In May 2022, Lambda Legal launched the podcast, "Making the Case," hosted by Alex Berg, discussing the organization's litigation and advocacy work..

In 2026, Lambda Legal joined the American Civil Liberties Union and the New York Civil Liberties Union in representing transgender patients in federal litigation concerning access to medical records related to gender-affirming care. The lawsuit arose amid disputes between the Trump administration, health-care providers, and patients over the confidentiality of medical records and the privacy rights of transgender patients.

== Public education ==
Lambda Legal publishes reports, surveys, and educational materials related to LGBTQ rights and HIV-related issues. Lambda Legal publishes the "Little Black Book", which contains information regarding protection against police harassment of gay men "cruising" for sex in public places, and other dangers. On April 20, 2023, Lambda Legal partnered with the non-profit organizations Black and Pink National, and Strength in Numbers Consulting Group to publish the "Protected & Served" Survey The report is a data-quantitative information of personal stories conducted across over 2,500 LGBTQ+ people and people living with HIV capturing their experiences with misconduct involving police, courts, prisons, jails, schools, and other government agencies.

== See also ==
- LGBT rights in the United States
- List of LGBT rights organizations
- Diaz v. Brewer
- Henkle v. Gregory
