= Sex sting =

Type of sting operation

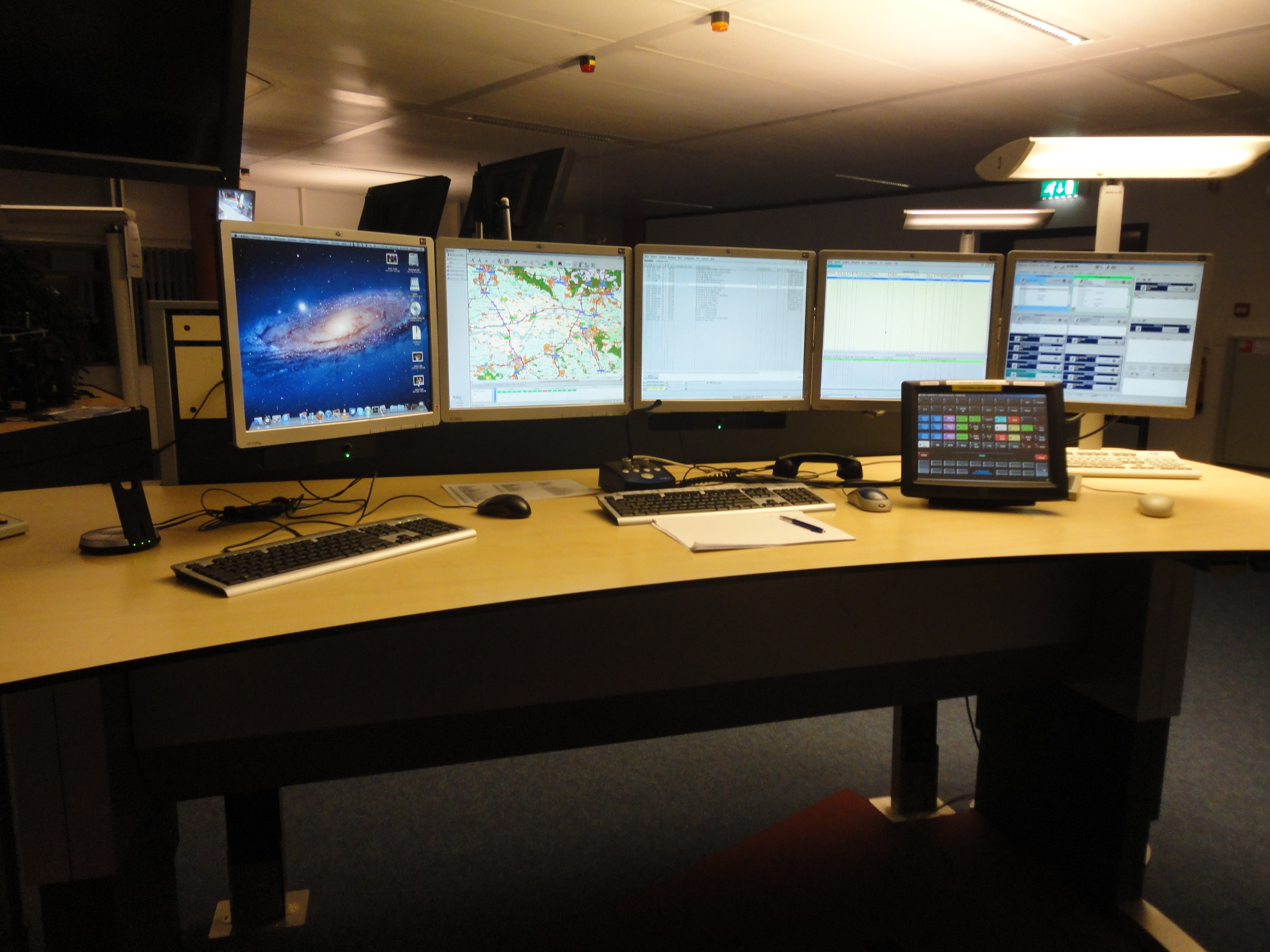
Law enforcement computer gear

A sex sting is a type of sting operation where a person, usually a law enforcement officer, purports to be a child or teenager on the internet in order to engage in sexually explicit activities with an adult. The evidence of the interactions between the two parties is then collected by the undercover agent and used in criminal prosecutions.

Sex stings are valid for legal purposes in the United States, Australia, Singapore and the United Kingdom.

== Characteristics ==
Law enforcement sex sting operations are operated by a police officer who pretends to be a minor on the internet. The officer contacts a suspected child predator online and subsequently arranges a face-to-face meeting with them at an agreed location, where an arrest will be made.

Online profiles used by undercover officers generally feature sexually suggestive nicknames. The age of the fake minor is usually not featured on the account's public information. Some law enforcement agencies have used authorized pictures to convince the suspect that the person behind the account is a real minor.

=== Stings by vigilante groups ===
Sex stings operated by vigilante groups are conducted by chatting with a suspect on the internet and then arranging a real-life meeting with them. During the meeting, the suspect is confronted and detained by the vigilante group. Afterwards, law enforcement is notified and the suspect is taken for questioning. In some cases, online platforms may be used to "name and shame" the suspect.

Some groups reject applying the word "vigilante" to themselves, while others do not. Vigilante groups that conduct sex stings are different from spontaneous vigilante collectives due to the organized methodologies of their operations.

Some scholars have pointed out that online sex stings conducted by people other than law-enforcement are laden with legal, ethical and moral problems. Although vigilante groups have claimed that many offenders have been convicted due to their operations, law enforcement officers have generally discouraged these groups from engaging in justice-seeking and advised them to leave such matters to the police. Common criticisms of vigilante conduct include that it hinders police work, compromises official investigations and may result in innocent people being misidentified as perpetrators. In some cases, vigilantes have been criminally charged during their own operations.

=== Compared to real child solicitation cases ===
Internet sex sting cases differ from cases where a real child is enticed by an adult online. Research has shown that the type of offenders caught in sex stings is different from those caught in real victimization cases. Studies have also reported that there are differences between the behaviors of real children online versus undercover vigilantes and law enforcement officers (LEOs) purporting to be children. Among other differences, undercover law enforcement officers and vigilantes posing as minors are more likely than real victims to be open to online sexual behavior and request real-life meetings.

Researchers have also found that vigilantes and LEOs differ from real victims when reacting to sexual comments and in the overt sexual explicitness of their profiles. Vigilantes and LEOs chats are also shorter and feature more pointed language than victim chats. Furthermore, the eagerness reported in undercover agents does not reflect the distrust or language used by real teenagers.

A high-profile report published by the Berkman Center for Internet and Society at Harvard University stated that the majority of sexual solicitation that teenagers receive online come from peers and or adults aged 18 to 21. The study also reported that minors are generally able to rebuff unwanted online solicitations while feeling little to no emotional distress.

Similar to offline offenders, online offenders who contacted real teenagers are rarely strangers, but rather people known to the victim in real life.

== Offenders ==
A study published in 2005 classified its sample of online sting offenders as mostly white, male, educated, employed, aged 35 and having no criminal record. Another study from the same year stated that these offenders are older, from a higher socioeconomic status and less likely to have a sexual and non-sexual criminal history. The first study also reported that internet sting offenders are more likely to have hebephilia and ephebophilia than pedophilia.

Compared to offenders who engage in physical sexual abuse, online sting offenders are often whiter, younger, less likely to be married and have higher level of victim empathy and impulse control. A 2017 report that evaluated 334 men convicted of sex stings stated that 87% of the sample had no prior, concurrent or subsequent convictions.

In a study published in the 2020s that examined online sting offenders, the most people in the sample had brought sex paraphernalia to the meeting place.

=== Offender motivations ===
Internet sex stings are usually conducted under the premise that an adult who shows up will eventually engage in child sexual abuse. There are, however, empirically validated theories according to which people's judgements about motivations for illegal behaviors are often inaccurate. The fundamental attribution error theory, for example, posits that human beings are more prone to attribute a person's behavior to their intrinsic characteristics rather than the external, situational circumstances they find themselves in.

When applied to sex stings, the fundamental attribution error theory suggests that society is more likely to attribute the behavior of an alleged offender to their personal characteristics (e.g. sexual attraction to minors) rather than situational factors (e.g. the characteristics of the conversation with the undercover agent). As shown in the Stanford prison experiment, where healthy participants began exhibiting immoral and cruel behaviors when placed into situations that fostered such actions, situational factors can play a significant role in influencing a normal person's actions.

In a study of internet sex offenders, in which the majority of the sample were arrested for online stings, researchers suggested that many of the offenders were motivated by a sexual fantasy and would not have progressed to engage in in-person sexual assault (they classified those as "chatroom offenders"). In this study, only 10% of the 51 men who received psychological evaluation were reported to have a sexual interest in children. This finding is consistent with other studies that report that these offenders rarely have any history of sexual offenses.

== Legality ==
Sex stings are a legally valid tool for criminal prosecutions in the United States, Canada, the United Kingdom, Australia and Singapore.
