= 2008 Arizona Proposition 102 =

Referendum to ban same-sex marriage

Arizona Proposition 102
- November 4, 2008
- Marriage Protection Amendment; Amends the Arizona Constitution to define marriage between one man and one woman.

Results
Choice	Votes	%
Yes	1,258,355	56.20%
No	980,753	43.80%
Valid votes	2,239,108	96.48%
Invalid or blank votes	81,743	3.52%
Total votes	2,320,851	100.00%
Registered voters/turnout	2,987,451	74.95%
County results
Yes
70–80%
60–70%
50–60%
No
50–60%

Arizona Proposition 102 was an amendment to the constitution of the U.S. state of Arizona adopted by a ballot measure held in 2008. It added Article 30 of the Arizona Constitution, which says: "Only a union of one man and one woman shall be valid or recognized as a marriage in this state." The amendment added a constitutional ban on same-sex marriage to existing statutory bans in place since 1996.

In October 2014, Article 30 of the Arizona Constitution was struck down as federally unconstitutional in the United States District Court for the District of Arizona, and is no longer enforced by the state of Arizona, which subsequently allows and recognizes same-sex marriages.

Despite the court ruling, Article 30 remains in the state's constitution, and on the Arizona State Legislature's website there is no indication that Article 30 of the constitution was struck down or otherwise rendered inoperative.

== Overview ==
On August 26, 2008, Arizona Attorney General Terry Goddard and Secretary of State Jan Brewer agreed that the ballot description would state that same-sex marriage was already prohibited by statute. Incorporating the same provision into the Arizona Constitution was meant to prevent an Arizona court from ruling that the statute was invalid under the Arizona Constitution.

Along with similar measures in California (California Proposition 8 (2008)) and Florida (Florida Amendment 2 (2008)), Proposition 102 was decided by voters in the general election on November 4, 2008. The amendment passed by a margin of 56% in favor and 44% against.

Proposition 102 had no immediate impact because its definition of marriage was consistent with the existing statutory definition. As an amendment to the Constitution of Arizona, the definition cannot be changed by the state legislature, and the possibility that a state court might find a state constitutional guarantee of same-sex couples' right to marry is eliminated.

== Supporters and opponents ==
As of August 27, 2008 three committees related to Proposition 102 were registered with the Secretary of State: YESforMarriage.com supporting Prop 102 was the one committee in support, and the two committees in opposition were No on Prop 102 and Arizona Together Opposed to Prop 102.

Supporters said that Proposition 102 was necessary to prevent judges changing the legal definition of marriage, as was done in Massachusetts, California, Connecticut and Iowa. Opponents said that Proposition 102 was unnecessary because same-sex marriage was already illegal in Arizona, and that there were more pressing issues facing Arizona; also they cited the issue of the separation of church and state.

== Miscellaneous ==
Proposition 102 was placed on the ballot via referendum rather than through the initiative process on the last day of the legislative session. Presiding State Senator Jack Harper defeated a filibuster on June 27, 2008 to place the proposed Constitutional Amendment on the ballot. Harper faced an ethics investigation over allegedly violating Senate rules by cutting off the microphones of two senators who were attempting to filibuster the bill. Despite the fact that Harper admitted to cutting off the microphones intentionally, a Senate ethics committee consisting of three Republicans and two Democrats voted 3–2, along strict party lines, to dismiss the charges.

State Senators Jack W. Harper, Ronald Gould, Thayer Verschoor, and John Huppenthal stood out as the proponents of the Marriage Amendment to the Arizona State Constitution. The language of Prop 102 was adopted as a strike-everything amendment to Senator Gould's SCR1042.

In 2006, a more restrictive measure, Proposition 107, had been defeated in the general election.

== Results ==
Arizona Proposition 102
Choice	Votes	%
For	1,258,355	56.20
Against	980,753	43.80
Total	2,239,108	100.00

=== By county ===
County	Yes (%)	Yes (#)	No (%)	No (#)
Apache	76%	18,044	23%	5,405
Cochise	63%	30,492	37%	17,582
Coconino	50%	26,845	49%	26,264
Gila	68%	14,443	32%	6,884
Graham	80%	9,406	20%	2,352
Greenlee	73%	2,024	27%	744
La Paz	66%	3,524	34%	1,785
Maricopa	55%	741,797	45%	595,077
Mohave	66%	43,258	34%	21,861
Navajo	75%	25,317	25%	8,460
Pima	49%	188,942	51%	195,148
Pinal	61%	62,425	39%	39,457
Santa Cruz	52%	6,412	48%	5,902
Yavapai	61%	59,497	39%	38,546
Yuma	63%	25,929	37%	15,286
Total	56.2%	1,258,355	43.8%	980,753

== Full text ==
Be it resolved by the Senate of the State of Arizona, the House of Representatives concurring:

1. Article XXX, Constitution of Arizona, is proposed to be added as follows if approved by the voters and on proclamation of the Governor:

ARTICLE XXX. MARRIAGE

SECTION 1. ONLY A UNION OF ONE MAN AND ONE WOMAN SHALL BE VALID OR RECOGNIZED AS A MARRIAGE IN THIS STATE.

2. The Secretary of State shall submit this proposition to the voters at the next general election as provided by article XXI, Constitution of Arizona.

== Effects ==
The amendment, which took effect on December 1, 2008, constitutionally banned same-sex marriages, which were never recognized by the state and were statutorily banned since 1975. Arizona became the 29th US state to ban same-sex marriage in its constitution. This preempted the state judiciary from requiring the state to legally recognize same-sex marriages and preempted the Arizona State Legislature from enacting a statute legalizing same-sex marriages.

== Pre-decision opinion polls ==
Date of opinion poll	Conducted by	Sample size	In favor	Against	Undecided	Margin	Margin of Error	Source
September 25 – 28, 2008	KAET-TV and Arizona State University	976 registered voters	49%	42%	9%	7% pro	±3%	
Prior to May 15, 2008	?	?	49%	40%	11%	9% pro	?	

== See also ==
- Arizona Proposition 107 (2006)
- List of Arizona Ballot Propositions
- LGBT rights in Arizona
