= 1850 North Carolina gubernatorial election =

- August 1, 1850
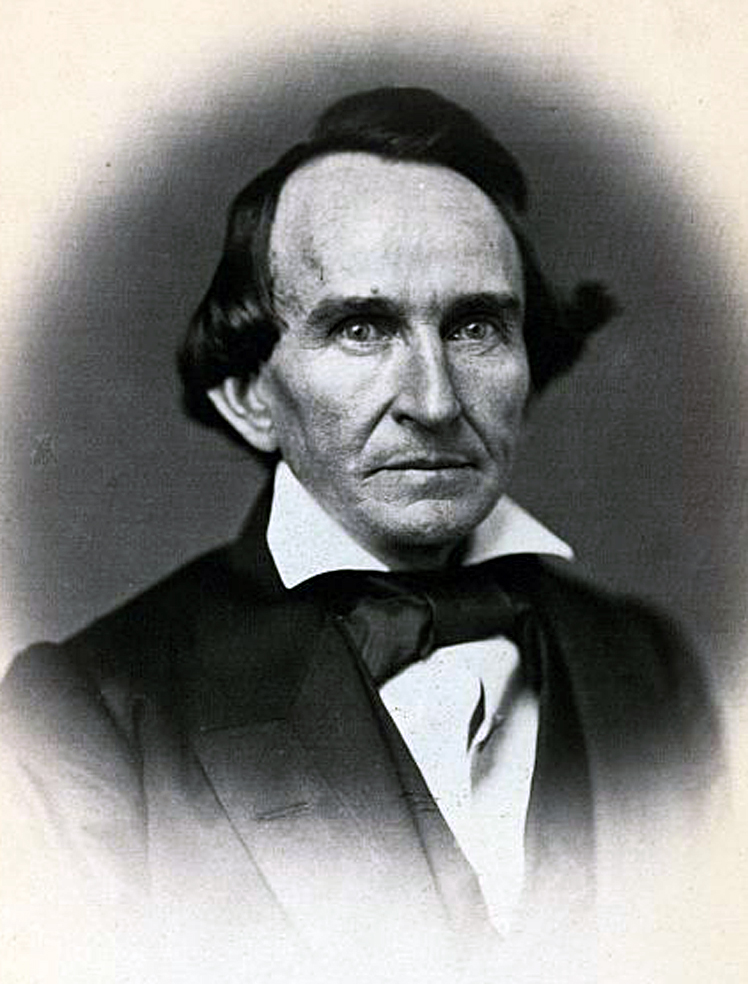

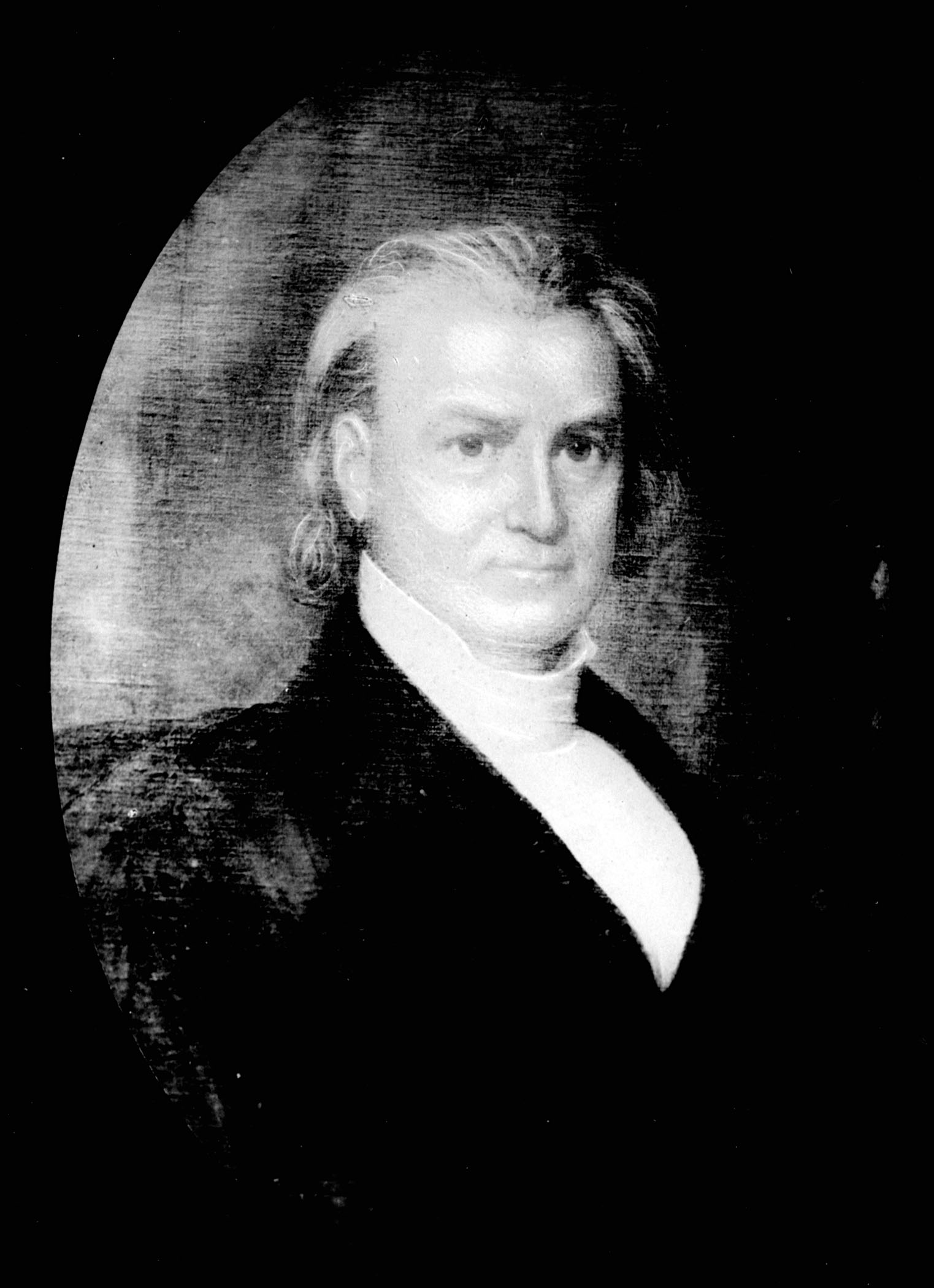
Nominee	David Settle Reid	Charles Manly
Party	Democratic	Whig
Popular vote	45,827	42,972
Percentage	51.61%	48.39%
- County results Reid: 50–60% 60–70% 70–80% 80–90% 90–100% Manly: 50–60% 60–70% 70–80% 80–90% 90–100% No Data/Vote
Governor before election
Charles Manly
Whig
Elected Governor
David Settle Reid
Democratic

The 1850 North Carolina gubernatorial election was held on August 1, 1850, in order to elect the governor of North Carolina. Democratic nominee and former member of the U.S. House of Representatives from North Carolina's 3rd district David Settle Reid defeated incumbent Whig governor Charles Manly in a rematch of the previous election.

== General election ==
On election day, August 1, 1850, Democratic nominee David Settle Reid won the election by a margin of 2,855 votes against his opponent incumbent Whig governor Charles Manly, thereby gaining Democratic control over the office of governor. Reid was sworn in as the 32nd governor of North Carolina on January 1, 1851.

=== Results ===
North Carolina gubernatorial election, 1850
Party	Candidate	Votes	%
Democratic	David Settle Reid	45,827	51.61
Whig	Charles Manly (incumbent)	42,972	48.39
Total votes		88,799	100.00
Democratic gain from Whig			
