= Thomas Settle =

Thomas Settle may refer to:

- Thomas Settle (North Carolina, 15th–16th Congress) (1789–1857), U.S. Representative from North Carolina, 1817–1821
- Thomas Settle (judge) (1831–1888), American judge and politician in North Carolina, Minister to Peru
- Thomas Settle (North Carolina, 53rd–54th Congress) (1865–1919), U.S. Representative from North Carolina, 1893–1897
- Thomas G. W. Settle (1895–1980), U.S. Navy aviator and rear admiral
