= Henrietta Williams Settle Reid =

First Lady of North Carolina (1851–1854)

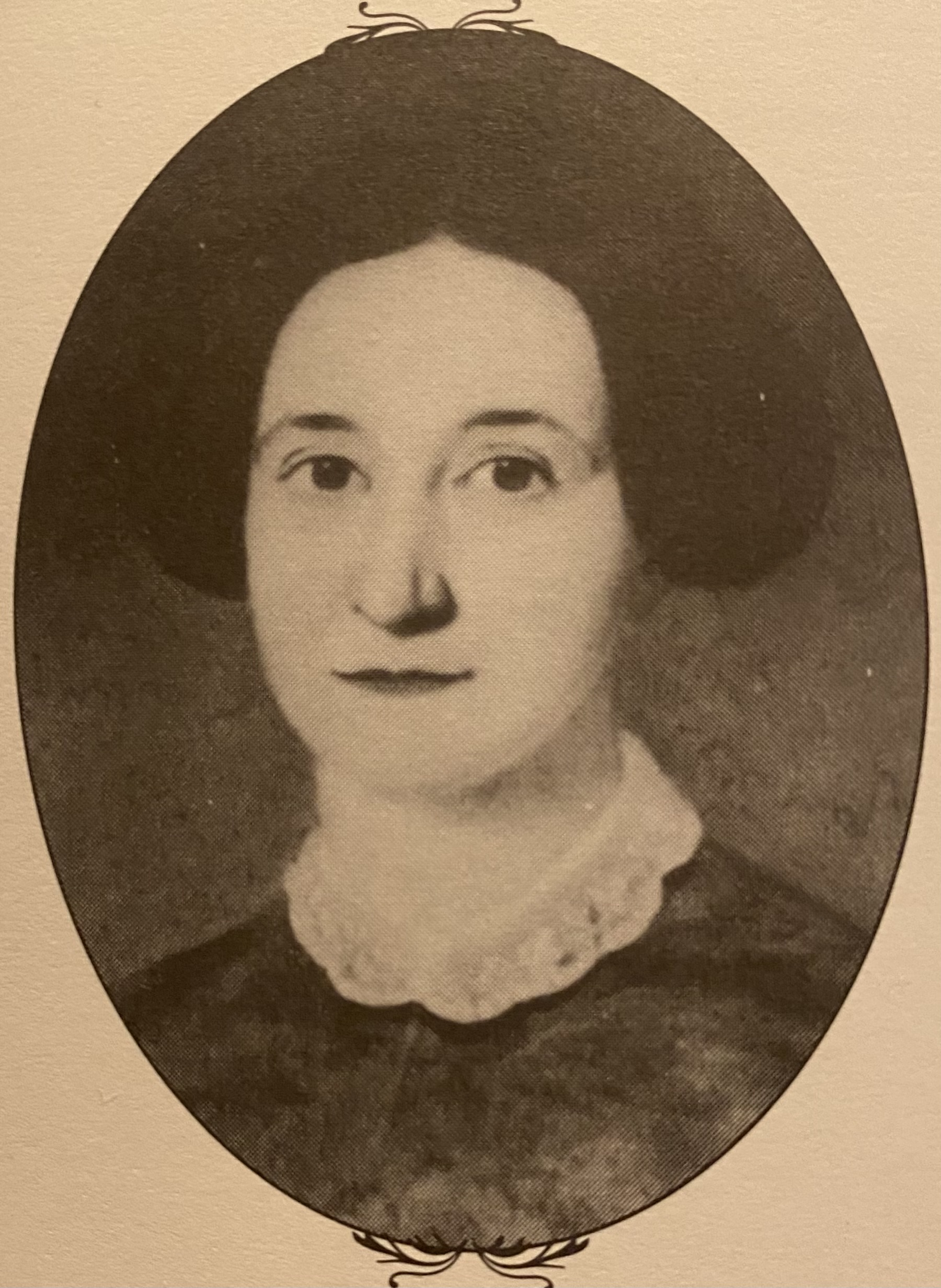

First Lady of North Carolina
- In office January 1, 1851 – December 6, 1854
- Governor: David Settle Reid
- Preceded by: Charity Hare Haywood Manly
- Succeeded by: vacant

Personal details
- Born: Henrietta Williams Settle; October 7, 1824 Madison, North Carolina, U.S.
- Died: March 3, 1913 (aged 88) Reidsville, North Carolina, U.S.
- Resting place: Greenview Cemetery
- Spouse: David Settle Reid
- Parent(s): Thomas Settle; Henrietta Graves
- Relatives: Thomas Settle Jr. (brother); Thomas Settle III (nephew)
- Occupation: planter

Henrietta Williams Settle Reid (October 7, 1824 – March 3, 1913) was an American planter who, as the wife of David Settle Reid, was the first lady of North Carolina from 1851 to 1854.

Reid was born Henrietta Williams Settle on October 7, 1824. She was the daughter of U.S. congressman Thomas Settle Sr. and Henrietta Williams Graves. She was a sister of the judge Thomas Settle.

She married her first cousin, David Settle Reid, on December 19, 1850. They had four children: David Jr., Thomas, Carrie, and Reuben David. They lived at the 700-acre Reid Plantation near the Dan River, where they enslaved twenty-two people. She later lived here as a widow for twenty years. From 1851 to 1854, she served as the state's first lady while her husband served as governor.

Reid died from pneumonia on March 3, 1913 in Reidsville, North Carolina.
