= Daily Record (Wilmington, N.C.) =

The Daily Record
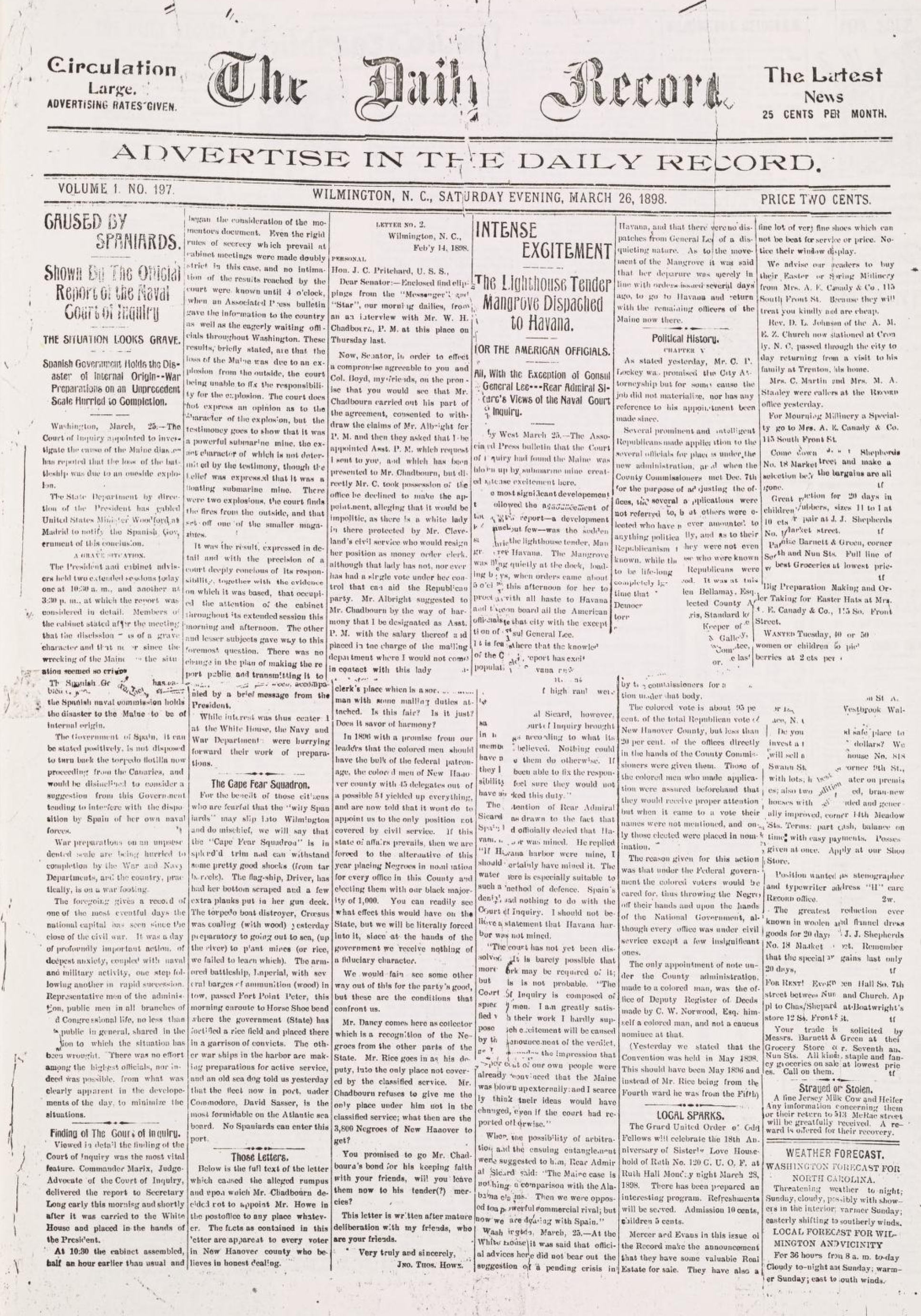
- Daily Record, Volume 1 No. 197, March 26, 1898
- Type: Daily newspaper
- Format: Broadsheet
- Owner(s): Alexander Lightfoot Manly, Frank Graham Manly
- Publisher: Record Publishing Co.
- Editor: Alexander Manly
- Founded: 1895
- Ceased publication: November 10, 1898
- Language: English
- Headquarters: Love and Charity Hall, 7th Street, Wilmington, North Carolina
- Country: United States

The Daily Record was an African American newspaper published in Wilmington, North Carolina from 1895 until its destruction on November 10, 1898. It was owned and edited by Alex Lightfoot Manly and co-owned by his brother Frank Graham Manly, who took on the role of General Manager. At the time, the Daily Record was the only Black-owned newspaper in the city and was considered the only Black-owned daily periodical in the United States, marketing itself as “The Only Negro Daily in the World.” The paper covered both local and national news, with readers and advertisers from both the Black and white communities in Wilmington.

The Daily Record’s offices were burned to the ground during the Wilmington Coup d'état of 1898, an insurrection of the city’s biracial government by white supremacists. The destruction of the offices, as well as the coup itself, has largely been attributed to an editorial that Manly published in the August 18, 1898 edition of the paper, condemning accusations of Black men raping white women. Today, only seven issues of the paper have been recovered.

== Background ==
During the 1890s, Wilmington was North Carolina’s largest city with an 1898 population of 20,055 residents, 11,324 of which were Black. At the time, Black residents of Wilmington held jobs as doctors and lawyers, owned property and businesses, and held elected government positions, including seats in the U.S. House of Representatives. Black political participation in Wilmington grew under the Fusionist political movement, which combined white Populists with Black and white Republicans to challenge the Democratic control of the state.

Alexander Manly assumed control over the Daily Record in 1895 as editor and co-owner along with his brother Frank Graham Manly as co-owner and general manager. In the September 28, 1895 edition, Frank Manly described the paper’s purpose as being “of the Negro for the Negro and by the Negro” with the promise of “continu[ing] to look after the interests of the Negro.” The Daily Record covered local and national news and advocated for the interests of the Black community. The Daily Record’s offices were located in Love and Charity Hall, 7th Street, Wilmington, NC. A monthly subscription was priced at 25 cents, with individual copies sold for two cents.

== 1898 White Supremacy Campaign ==
In 1898, Charles B. Aycock, a prominent member of the Democratic Party, wanted to become governor of North Carolina. The same year, the Democratic Party launched what historians have termed the 'White Supremacy Campaign,' an effort to drive Fusionist politicians out of office across the state.

Ahead of the 1898 state elections, the Democrats launched campaigns relying on racial propaganda, including headlines and cartoons, distributed primarily through the News & Observer in Raleigh, edited by Josephus Daniels. Daniels himself referred to the paper as “the militant voice of white supremacy.” White Democratic leaders openly called for the overthrow of Wilmington’s biracial municipal government, which they characterized as “Negro domination,” despite the city government being led by a white majority.

Democrats also targeted Black voters directly. The Democrats created a Red Shirt militia consisting of gunmen who would break into Black homes, beat Black people, and threaten to kill them if they registered to vote. White business owners were instructed to find out if their Black employees had registered to vote or planned on voting and fire them. On election day, Red Shirts patrolled the streets of Wilmington, intimidating and preventing Black men from voting. Election officials threw out Republican ballots and replaced them with Democratic ballots.

== Felton’s Speech and Manly’s Editorial ==
On August 11, 1897, Rebecca Latimer Felton gave a speech to the Georgia Agricultural Society, in which she called for the lynching of Black men to protect white women from rape. Felton stated that “if it needs lynching to protect woman’s dearest possession from the ravening human beasts----then I say lynch, a thousand times a week if necessary.” In 1898, Democratic newspapers reprinted and circulated the speech.

In the August 18, 1898 issue of the Daily Record, Manly printed an editorial directly responding to Felton’s speech. Manly argued that white men were hypocrites, citing their exploitation of Black women, while they argued for the protection of white women. In his editorial, Manly stated:

"Tell your men that it is no worse for a black man to be intimate with a white woman than for the white man to be intimate with a colored woman. You set yourselves down as a lot of carping hypocrites — in fact you cry aloud for the virtue of your women while you seek to destroy the morality of ours."

Manly also argued against the label of rape itself, pointing at the charge often only being applied when a relationship was discovered.

Within five days, Democratic newspapers reprinted Manly’s 1898 editorial under headlines such as “Vile and Villainous” and “A Horrid Slander.” These newspapers characterized Black Americans as condoning rape and supporting interracial relationships. Following the editorial, white advertisers pulled their ads from the Daily Record. Manly was evicted from his offices, and received death threats. Many Black citizens of Wilmington criticized the editorial and distanced themselves from Manly. The Wilmington Republican Party Executive Committee, made up of 14 Black people and 1 white person, labeled the editorial as a “base and vile libel upon countless thousands of good people.”

== Wilmington Coup d'État of 1898 ==
Through threats and intimidation tactics, the Democratic Party won the state elections on November 8, 1898. However, Wilmington’s local government remained under the Fusionist movement’s control.

On November 9, 1898, the Wilmington Messenger published an announcement calling the white men of Wilmington to meet at the Court House, stating that "business in the furtherance of White Supremacy will be transacted." The resolution of the meeting was referred to as the “White Declaration of Independence,” and was published in the Raleigh News and Observer on November 10, 1898. The declaration promised that whites would never again be ruled by “men of African origin” and called for the Daily Record to cease publication, demanding that Manly leave the city within 24 hours.

On the morning of November 10, 1898, a mob of approximately 2,000 armed white men marched on the Daily Record printing offices, broke in, and burned the building to the ground. Violence broke out at the intersection of Fourth and Harnett Streets when shots were fired into a group of Black men.

The mob then marched on City Hall, where they forced the elected Republican mayor and city aldermen to resign. Violence spread through Black neighborhoods across the city. Red Shirts fired on Black residents with rifles, revolvers, and a Gatling gun. Historians estimate the total death toll to be between 60 and 300 Black citizens, though the full death toll has never been confirmed. Thousands of Black residents, including prominent business owners and elected officials, were forcibly exiled from the city.

The events of November 10, 1898 are recognized by historians as the only successful coup d'état in United States history. No one was ever prosecuted for the violence.

== Lasting Impact ==
Following the coup, the state legislature passed a suffrage amendment disenfranchising Black voters and passed the state’s first Jim Crow laws. Black residents made up approximately 56% of Wilmington's population in the 1890s. As of 2025, that figure has fallen to 14.5%.

== Legacy ==
After fleeing Wilmington, the Manly brothers moved to Washington, D.C. and re-established the Washington Daily Record, running it for four more years before handing it off to another editor. The story of the Wilmington coup d'état was suppressed for more than a century and termed a “race riot” started by Black citizens. Until 2006, a widely used textbook taught in classrooms, North Carolina: A Proud State in Our Nation, had no mention of a coup or massacre at all.

Very few copies of the Daily Record are known to have survived. Author and editor John Jeremiah Sullivan and Joel Finsel, working with the Third Person Project and groups of Wilmington eighth-grade students, located and transcribed seven surviving issues. Three issues were found in Wilmington at the Cape Fear Museum, three at the Schomburg Center for Research in Black Culture in New York City, and one at the State Archives of North Carolina in Raleigh. The project also gathered content from the Daily Record that had been reprinted by other newspapers of the time and compiled a “Remnants” issue in the same style of the original paper. All surviving issues and the Remnants volumes are available through the North Carolina Digital Heritage Center and the Third Person Project website.
