= 1848 North Carolina gubernatorial election =

- August 3, 1848
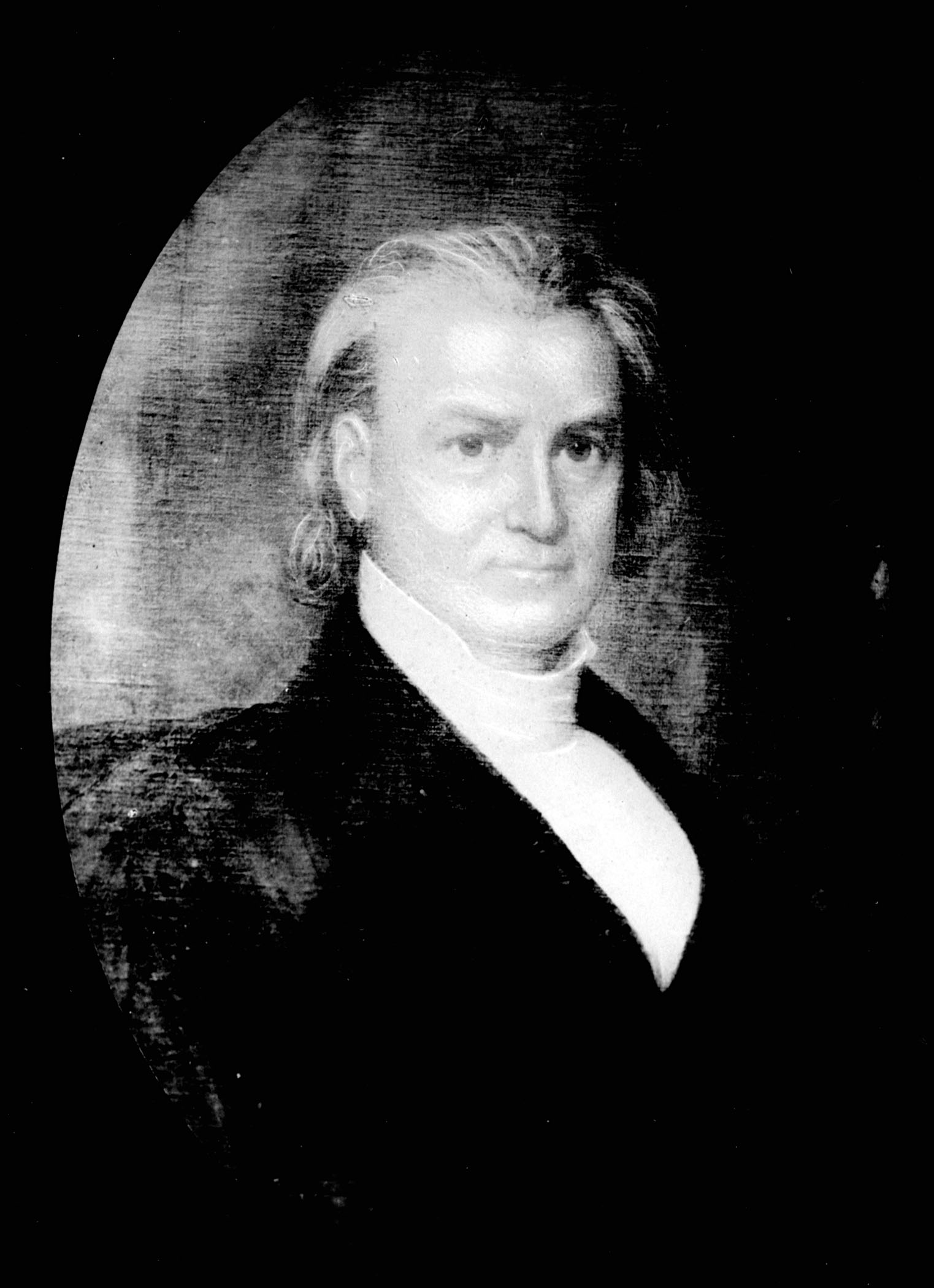

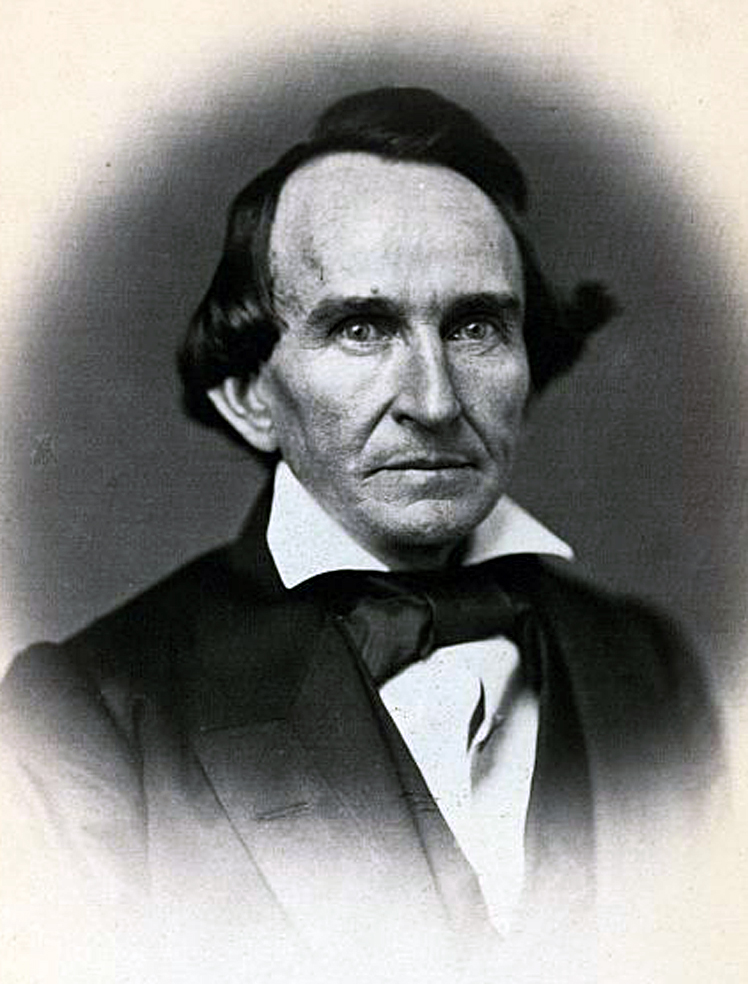
Nominee	Charles Manly	David Settle Reid
Party	Whig	Democratic
Popular vote	42,536	41,682
Percentage	50.51%	49.49%
- County results Manly: 50–60% 60–70% 70–80% 80–90% 90–100% Reid: 50–60% 60–70% 70–80% 80–90% 90–100% No Data/Vote
Governor before election
William Alexander Graham
Whig
Elected Governor
Charles Manly
Whig

The 1848 North Carolina gubernatorial election was held on August 3, 1848, in order to elect the Governor of North Carolina. Whig nominee Charles Manly defeated Democratic nominee and former member of the U.S. House of Representatives from North Carolina's 3rd district David Settle Reid.

== General election ==
On election day, August 3, 1848, Whig nominee Charles Manly won the election by a margin of 854 votes against his opponent Democratic nominee David Settle Reid, thereby retaining Whig control over the office of Governor. Manly was sworn in as the 31st Governor of North Carolina on January 1, 1849.

=== Results ===
North Carolina gubernatorial election, 1848
Party	Candidate	Votes	%
Whig	Charles Manly	42,536	50.51
Democratic	David Settle Reid	41,682	49.49
Total votes		84,218	100.00
Whig hold			
