= 1876 North Carolina gubernatorial election =

- November 7, 1876
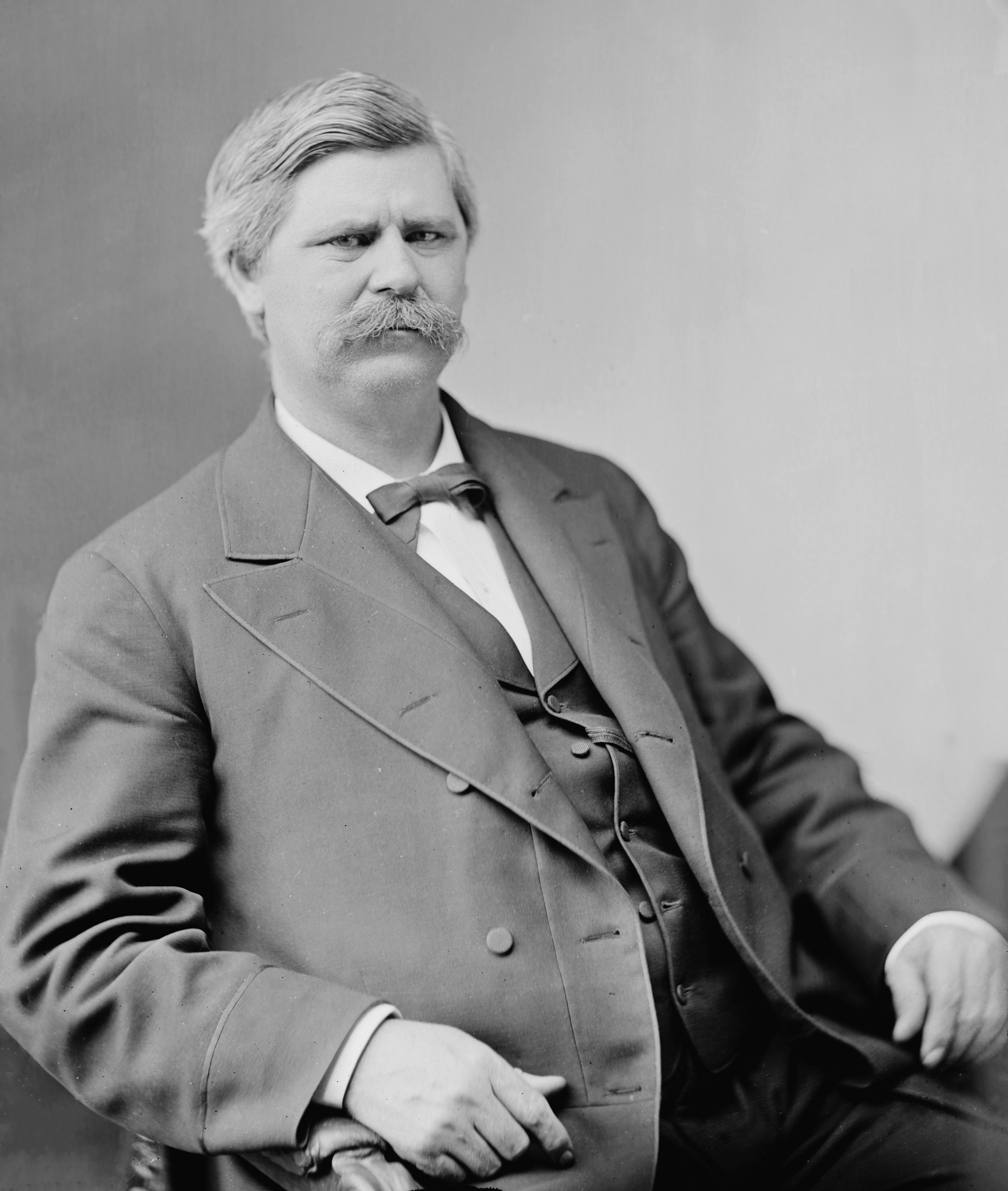

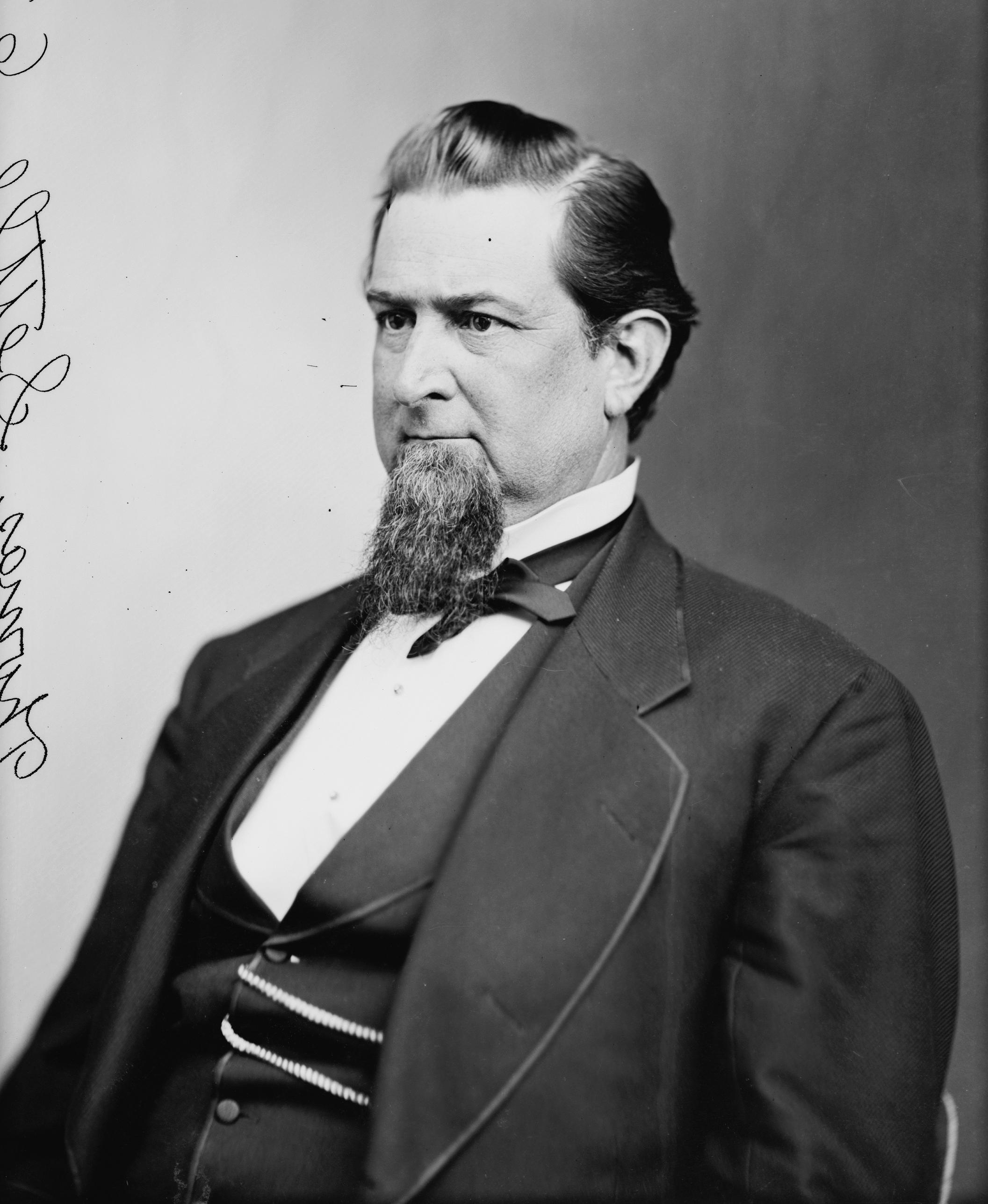
Nominee	Zebulon Baird Vance	Thomas Settle
Party	Democratic	Republican
Popular vote	123,265	110,061
Percentage	52.83%	47.17%
- County results Vance: 50–60% 60–70% 70–80% 80–90% Settle: 50–60% 60–70% No Data/Vote
Governor before election
Curtis Hooks Brogden
Republican
Elected Governor
Zebulon Baird Vance
Democratic

The 1876 North Carolina gubernatorial election was held on November 7, 1876. Democratic nominee Zebulon Baird Vance defeated Republican nominee Thomas Settle with 52.83% of the vote.

== Democratic convention ==
The Democratic convention was held on June 14, 1876.

=== Candidates ===
- Zebulon Baird Vance, former Governor
- David Settle Reid, former United States Senator

=== Results ===
Democratic convention results
Party	Candidate	Votes	%
Democratic	Zebulon Baird Vance	962	99.59
Democratic	David Settle Reid	4	0.41%
Total votes		966	100.00

== Republican convention ==
The Republican convention was held on July 12, 1876.

=== Candidates ===
- Thomas Settle, former United States Envoy Extraordinary and Minister Plenipotentiary to Peru
- Oliver H. Dockery, former U.S. Representative

=== Results ===
Republican convention results
Party	Candidate	Votes	%
Republican	Thomas Settle	175	72.92
Republican	Oliver H. Dockery	65	27.08
Total votes		240	100.00

== General election ==
=== Candidates ===
- Zebulon Baird Vance, Democratic
- Thomas Settle, Republican

=== Results ===
1876 North Carolina gubernatorial election
Party	Candidate	Votes	%	±%
Democratic	Zebulon Baird Vance	123,265	52.83%	
Republican	Thomas Settle	110,061	47.17%	
Majority		13,204		
Turnout				
Democratic gain from Republican		Swing		
