= Senator Brower =

Senator Brower may refer to:

- Greg Brower (born 1964), Nevada State Senate
- John M. Brower (1845–1913), North Carolina State Senate
