= Gov. David S. Reid House =

Historic house in North Carolina, United States

- U.S. National Register of Historic Places
- U.S. Historic district – Contributing property
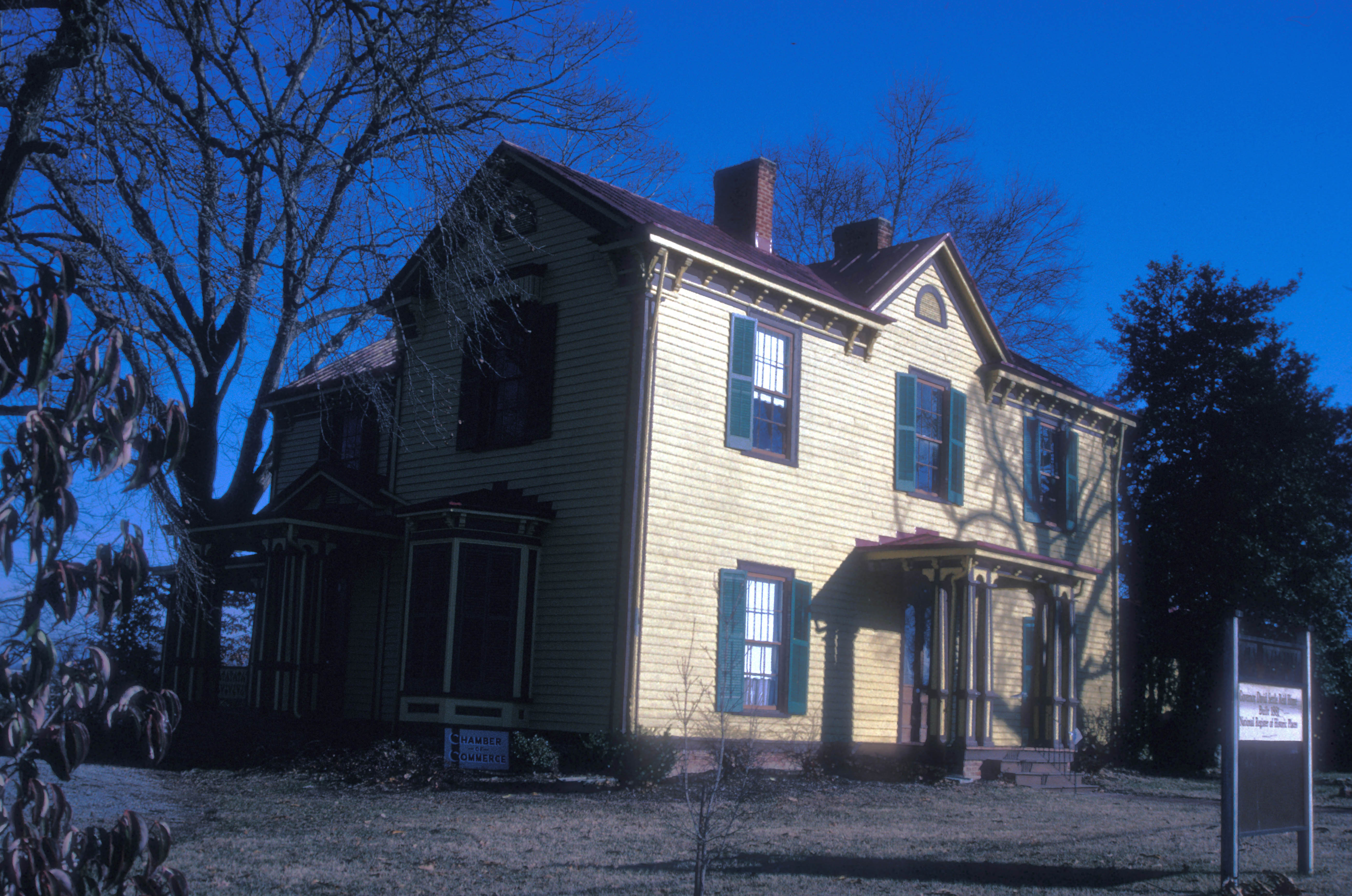
- Gov. David S. Reid House, July 1971

- Location within North Carolina Location within the United States
- Location: 321 SE Market St., Reidsville, North Carolina
- Coordinates: 36°21′36″N 79°39′46″W
- Area: less than one acre
- Built: 1881
- Built by: Walker, J.M., Co.
- Architectural style: Late Victorian
- NRHP reference No.: 74001374
- Added to NRHP: April 26, 1974

Gov. David S. Reid House is a historic house located at Reidsville, Rockingham County, North Carolina. It was built about 1881, and is a two-story, T-shaped, Late Victorian style frame dwelling. It sits on a brick foundation and has a gable roof and original one-story, rear shed projection and one-story rear kitchen wing. The front facade features a hipped roof entrance porch. It was the home of the home of North Carolina Governor David Settle Reid (1813-1891) from 1881 until his death in 1891. Following his death, his widow Henrietta Williams Settle Reid, continued to live in the house until her death in 1913.

It was listed on the National Register of Historic Places in 1974. It is located in the Reidsville Historic District.
