= State v. Linkhaw =

1873 case of the North Carolina Supreme Court

- Court: North Carolina Supreme Court
- Full case name: State of North Carolina v. William Linkhaw
- Decided: 1873
- Citation: 69 N.C. 214 (N.C. 1873)

Case history
- Appealed from: Robeson County Superior Court

Holding
- Since Linkhaw was attempting in good faith to worship, he cannot be subjected to criminal penalties. Guilty verdict vacated.

Court membership
- Judges sitting: Pearson, C.J., Reade, Rodman, Settle, Boyden

Case opinions
- Decision by: Settle, for a unanimous court

State v. Linkhaw, 69 N.C. 214 (N.C. 1873), was a case in which the North Carolina Supreme Court reversed a criminal conviction for disturbing a religious congregation. Defendant William Linkhaw, a Methodist, sang so poorly in church that a grand jury indicted him for disrupting the church's services. At trial, the evidence showed that Linkhaw's singing was so bad that the pastor once declined to sing a hymn at all. When a witness imitated Linkhaw's manner, the entire courtroom burst into laughter. Some of his fellow congregants found Linkhaw's singing amusing, but others were decidedly displeased. They asked him to cease singing, but Linkhaw, a faithfully religious man, replied that he felt a duty to worship God. All parties agreed that Linkhaw did not mean to disturb the service, but trial judge Daniel L. Russell ruled that he could nonetheless be held responsible because he ought to have known that his acts would result in a disruption of the congregation. The jury found Linkhaw guilty, and Russell fined him one penny. Linkhaw appealed to the North Carolina Supreme Court, which unanimously vacated the conviction. In an opinion by Justice Thomas Settle, the court ruled that Linkhaw could not be found guilty when he was genuinely trying to worship. Settle suggested that the matter was more appropriate for church discipline than for the courts of law. Because of its peculiar nature, the case attracted significant public attention from across the world.

== Incident ==
William Linkhaw attended the Methodist church in Lumberton, North Carolina. He sang hymns very loudly and very poorly. Deviating from the correct notes, he continued singing well after the congregation reached the end of each verse. This provoked various reactions from his fellow congregants: one portion of the church found Linkhaw's singing hilarious, while others were considerably displeased. On one occasion, the pastor simply read the hymn aloud, refusing to sing it because of the disruption that would inevitably occur. The presiding elder refused to preach in the church at all. Upon the entreaties of a prominent church member, Linkhaw once stayed quiet after a particularly solemn sermon. Yet he rejected the repeated pleas of his fellow congregants to remain silent altogether, responding that "he would worship his God, and that as a part of his worship it was his duty to sing".

== Trial ==
A Robeson County grand jury handed down a misdemeanor indictment against Linkhaw, charging that he had disturbed the congregation. The case went to trial in August 1872, with Judge Daniel L. Russell – who later was elected governor of North Carolina – presiding. Several witnesses, including the church's pastor, testified that Linkhaw's singing disturbed the church service. One witness, being asked to describe the way in which Linkhaw sang, gave an imitation of it. Singing a hymn in Linkhaw's style, the witness provoked what the court described as "a burst of prolonged and irresistible laughter, convulsing alike the spectators, the Bar, the jury and the Court". Witness testimony also showed, however, that Linkhaw was a devout and spiritual man, and the prosecution admitted that he was not deliberately attempting to disrupt worship. Linkhaw asked the court to instruct the jury that it could not find Linkhaw guilty unless it found intent to disturb the service. Russell, however, rejected this request, ruling instead that the jury only needed to determine whether Linkhaw's singing actually disrupted the service. Russell contended that a lack of intent did not excuse Linkhaw because he presumably should have known that disruption would result from his singing. The jury found Linkhaw guilty, and Russell fined him one penny.

== Appeal ==
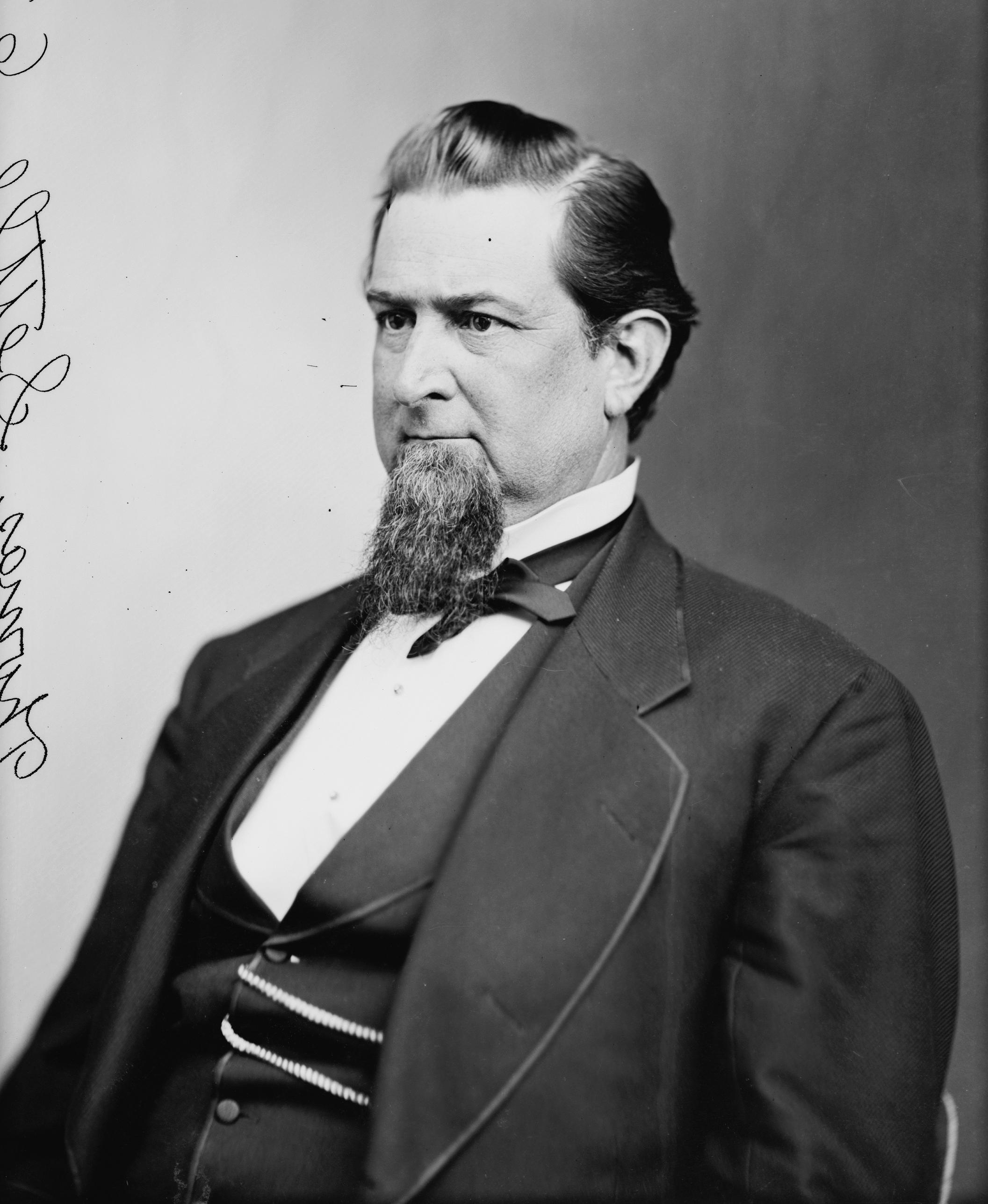
Justice Thomas Settle wrote the court's opinion in State v. Linkhaw.

Linkhaw appealed the judgment against him to the North Carolina Supreme Court; the case was heard in 1873. In an opinion by Justice Thomas Settle, the court unanimously set aside the verdict. The opinion accepted the jury's ruling that Linkhaw had indeed caused a substantial disturbance. It also agreed with Russell that intent can generally be presumed when the defendant could have anticipated his actions. However, the court observed that the prosecution had expressly admitted that Linkhaw had no malicious intent. The justices therefore held that the presumption, being contradicted by uncontested evidence, did not apply. The court issued a writ of venire de novo, nullifying the jury's verdict. Settle closed his opinion by noting that "[i]t would seem that the defendant is a proper subject for discipline of his church, but not for the discipline of the courts."

== Reactions and legacy ==
A 1964 article in the Charlotte Observer declared that Linkhaw's "lousy singing made [North Carolina] legal history". When asked in 1882 why they had chosen to reprint the already-old Linkhaw case, the Ohio Law Journal's editors responded that "[t]he case itself, aside from its importance as an authority, is of great interest as an example of ludicrous circumstances upon which are predicated both civil and criminal cases at law." The Green Bag, a legal magazine, published one poem about the case in 1889 and another in 1906; the latter contained the lines "And that, although the proof did show / That Linkhaw's voice was awful / The judges found no valid ground / For holding it unlawful." The Raleigh News & Observer opined in 1942 that Linkhaw was "the funniest case ever tried in the Supreme Court of North Carolina".
