= 1912 North Carolina gubernatorial election =

- November 5, 1912
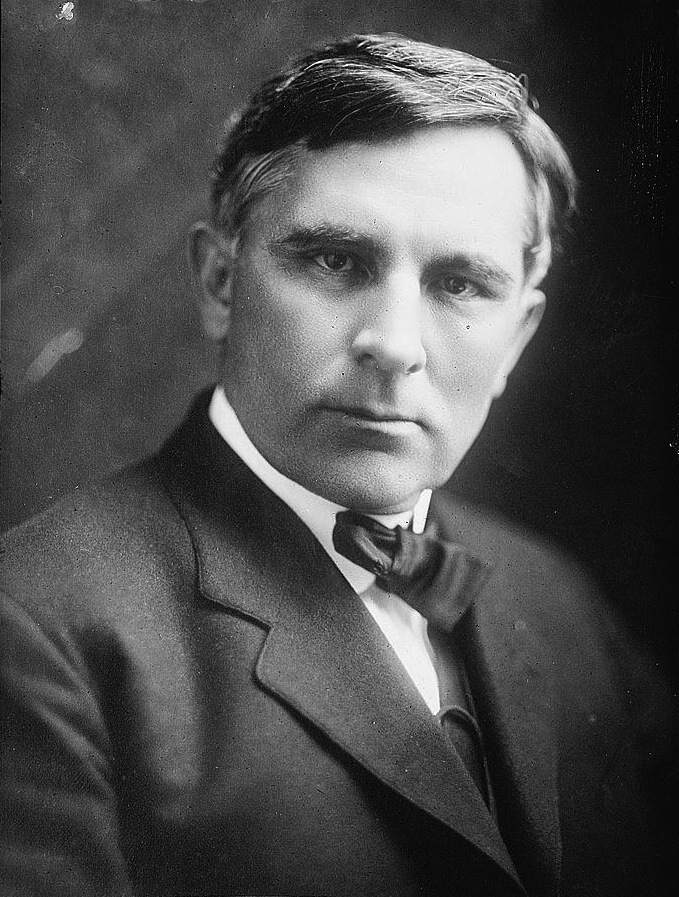

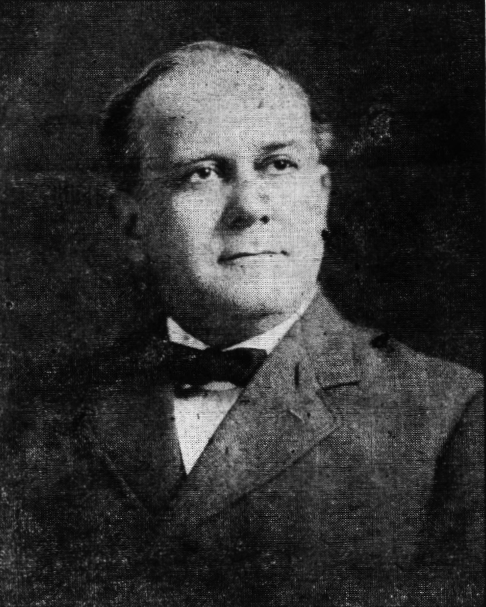

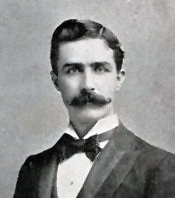
Nominee	Locke Craig	Iredell Meares	Thomas Settle
Party	Democratic	Progressive	Republican
Popular vote	149,975	49,930	43,625
Percentage	61.35%	20.42%	17.84%
- County results Craig: 30–40% 40–50% 50–60% 60–70% 70–80% 80–90% >90% Meares: 40–50% 50–60% 60–70% Settle: 40–50% 50–60%
Governor before election
William Walton Kitchin
Democratic
Elected Governor
Locke Craig
Democratic

The 1912 North Carolina gubernatorial election was held on November 5, 1912. Democratic nominee Locke Craig defeated Progressive nominee Iredell Meares with 61.35% of the vote.

== General election ==
=== Candidates ===
Major party candidates

- Locke Craig, Democratic
- Thomas Settle, Republican

Other candidates

- Iredell Meares, Progressive
- H.E. Hodges, Socialist

=== Results ===
1912 North Carolina gubernatorial election
Party	Candidate	Votes	%	±%
Democratic	Locke Craig	149,975	61.35%	
Progressive	Iredell Meares	49,930	20.42%	
Republican	Thomas Settle	43,625	17.84%	
Socialist	H.E. Hodges	944	0.39%	
Majority		100,045		
Turnout				
Democratic hold		Swing		
