= Thomas Settle (judge) =

American judge (1831–1888)

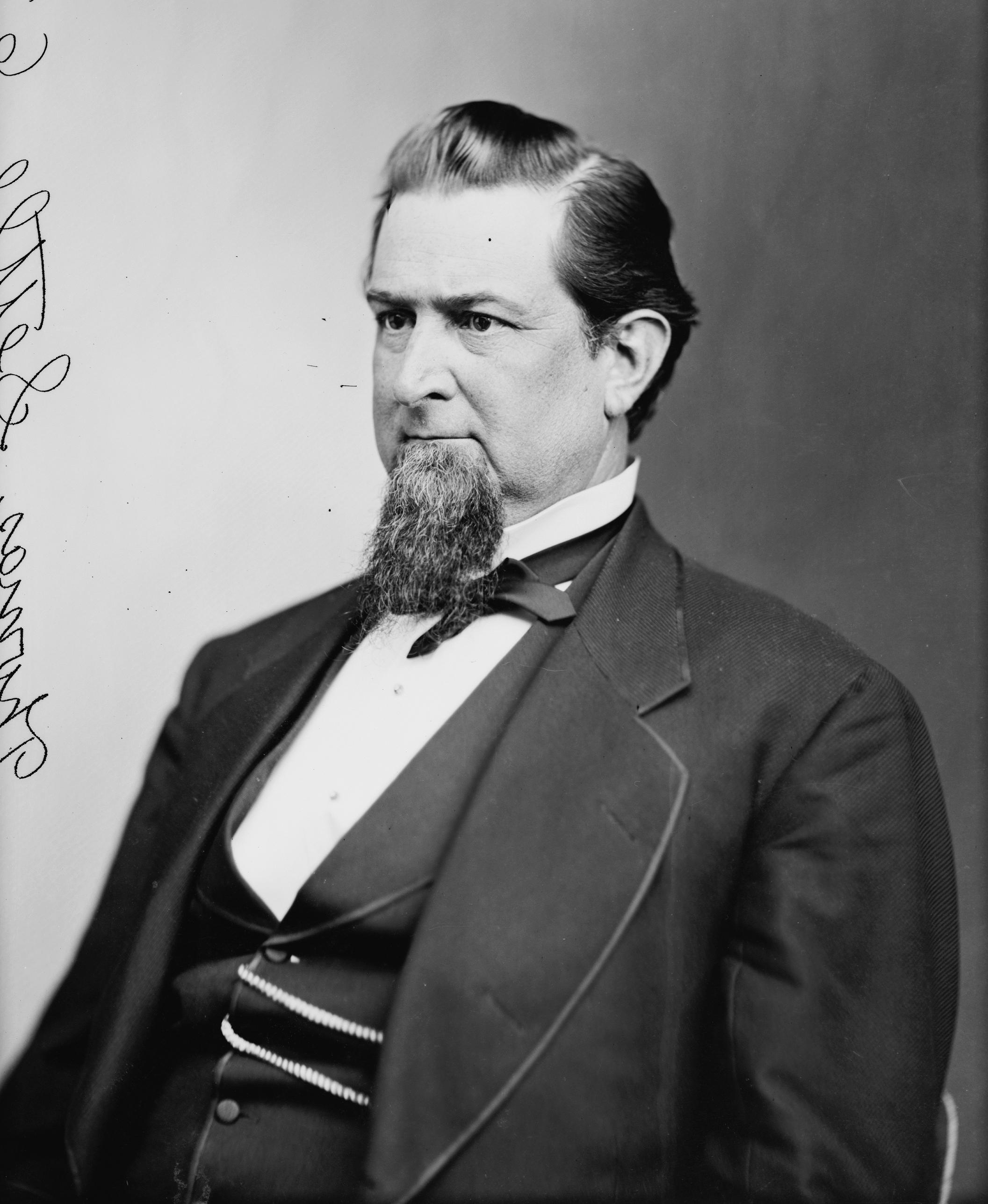

Judge of the United States District Court for the Northern District of Florida
- In office January 30, 1877 – December 1, 1888
- Appointed by: Ulysses S. Grant
- Preceded by: Philip Fraser
- Succeeded by: Charles Swayne

United States Envoy Extraordinary and Minister Plenipotentiary to Peru
- In office May 13, 1871 – November 22, 1871
- President: Ulysses S. Grant
- Preceded by: Alvin Peterson Hovey
- Succeeded by: Francis Thomas

Personal details
- Born: Thomas Settle; January 23, 1831 Rockingham County, North Carolina, U.S.
- Died: December 1, 1888 (aged 57) Raleigh, North Carolina, U.S.
- Party: Republican
- Other political affiliations: Democratic
- Spouse: Mary Glen
- Children: Thomas Settle
- Parent: Thomas Settle (father)
- Relatives: David Settle Reid
- Education: University of North Carolina at Chapel Hill (A.B.) read law

Thomas Settle (January 23, 1831 – December 1, 1888) was a United States Envoy Extraordinary and Minister Plenipotentiary to Peru, an associate justice of the Supreme Court of North Carolina and a United States district judge of the United States District Court for the Northern District of Florida.

== Education and career ==
Born on January 23, 1831, in Rockingham County, North Carolina, Settle received an Artium Baccalaureus degree in 1850 from the University of North Carolina at Chapel Hill and read law at Richmond Hill Law School in 1854. He was private secretary to Governor of North Carolina David Settle Reid from 1850 to 1854. He entered private practice in Rockingham County in 1854.

As a member of the Democratic Party, Settle was elected as a member of the North Carolina House of Commons (now the North Carolina House of Representatives) from 1854 to 1859, serving as Speaker from 1858 to 1859. He resumed private practice in North Carolina from 1860 to 1861. He was solicitor for the Fourth Judicial Circuit of North Carolina in 1861, and from 1862 to 1868. He was a Captain in the Confederate States Army from 1861 to 1862.

After the war ended, he was elected as a member of the North Carolina Senate and was speaker of that body. A supporter of Gov. William W. Holden, Settle helped Holden found the North Carolina Republican Party. He was an associate justice of the Supreme Court of North Carolina from 1868 to 1871, and from 1872 to 1876. He wrote the opinion for a unanimous court in State v. Linkhaw, reversing the criminal conviction of a man who sang so badly in church that he was found guilty of disturbing a religious congregation. In between his stints on the court, he served as United States Envoy Extraordinary and Minister Plenipotentiary to Peru in 1871.

Settle resigned from the Supreme Court in 1876 to accept the Republican nomination for governor. He lost the election to former Gov. Zebulon B. Vance.

== Federal judicial service ==
Settle was nominated by President Ulysses S. Grant on January 26, 1877, to a seat on the United States District Court for the Northern District of Florida vacated by Judge Philip Fraser. He was confirmed by the United States Senate on January 30, 1877, and received his commission the same day. His service terminated on December 1, 1888, due to his death in Raleigh, North Carolina.

== Family ==
Settle's father was also named Thomas Settle, as was his son, Thomas Settle. Both his father and his son served in the United States Congress.. He was the cousin and brother-in-law of North Carolina Governor David Settle Reid, under whom he had served as private secretary. David was married to his sister, Henrietta Williams Settle Reid. He was married to Mary Glen of Yadkin County and lived at Mulberry Island Plantation.

== Sources ==
- "Index to Politicians: Serr to Sewak". The Political Graveyard. 2005-03-10.
- "Documenting the American South: Settle, Thomas" (bio). University of North Carolina at Chapel Hill. 2005.

Party political offices
Preceded by Tod Robinson Caldwell	Republican nominee for Governor of North Carolina; 1876	Succeeded by Ralph P. Buxton
Diplomatic posts
Preceded by Alvin Peterson Hovey	United States Envoy Extraordinary and Minister Plenipotentiary to Peru; 1871	Succeeded by Francis Thomas
Legal offices
Preceded by Philip Fraser	Judge of the United States District Court for the Northern District of Florida; 1877–1888	Succeeded by Charles Swayne
