= A. H. A. Williams =

American politician and businessman (1842–1895)

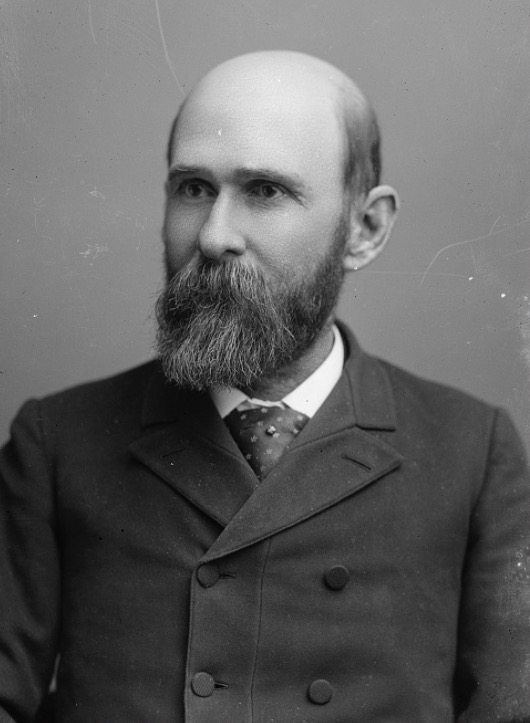
- Portrait of Williams by Charles Milton Bell, taken between January 1891 and January 1894

Member of the U.S. House of Representatives from North Carolina's 5th district
- In office March 4, 1891 – March 3, 1893
- Preceded by: John M. Brower
- Succeeded by: Thomas Settle

Member of the North Carolina House of Representatives from the Granville County district
- In office 1883–1885

Personal details
- Born: Archibald Hunter Arrington Williams; October 22, 1842 Louisburg, North Carolina, US
- Died: September 5, 1895 (aged 52) Chase City, Virginia, US
- Party: Democratic
- Occupation: Politician, businessman

Archibald Hunter Arrington Williams (October 22, 1842 – September 5, 1895) was an American politician and businessman. A Democrat, he was a member of the United States House of Representatives from North Carolina.

== Early life and education ==
Williams was born on October 22, 1842, either near Louisburg, North Carolina, or in Nash County. He was one of five children born to Henry Guston Williams and Elizabeth Nicholson (née Arrington) Williams. His father was a member of the North Carolina Senate. He was the nephew of Archibald Hunter Arrington, the second cousin twice removed of William Walton Kitchin and Claude Kitchin, and the second cousin thrice removed of A. Paul Kitchin.

Educated at common schools, Williams studied at Emory & Henry University.

== Career ==
During the American Civil War, Williams was for four years a private in the Army of Northern Virginia of the Confederate States Army. He was wounded at the Battle of Gettysburg and participated in the Battle of Appomattox Court House, during the latter of which he was captain of the 56th North Carolina Infantry Regiment. After the war, he was a farmer and merchant in Oxford, North Carolina. He was president of the Oxford and Henderson Railroad.

Williams was a Democrat. From 1883 to 1885, he represented Granville County in the North Carolina House of Representatives. He was a member of the United States House of Representatives from March 4, 1891, to March 3, 1893, representing North Carolina's 5th district. He lost the following election, though unsuccessfully claimed his successor, Thomas Settle III, won the election illegally. Politically, he was liberal.

== Personal life and death ==
For many years, Williams was a director of the Oxford Orphan Asylum. On July 25, 1871, he married Susan Alice Bryan. He was a member of the Freemasons and the Independent Order of Odd Fellows. He was nicknamed "Baldy". He died on September 5, 1895, aged 52, in Chase City, Virginia, from Bright's disease, and was buried at Elmwood Cemetery, in Oxford.

U.S. House of Representatives
Preceded by John M. Brower	Member of the U.S. House of Representatives from North Carolina's 6th congressional district 1891–1893	Succeeded by Thomas Settle III
