= Alexander Manly =

American newspaper owner (1866–1944)

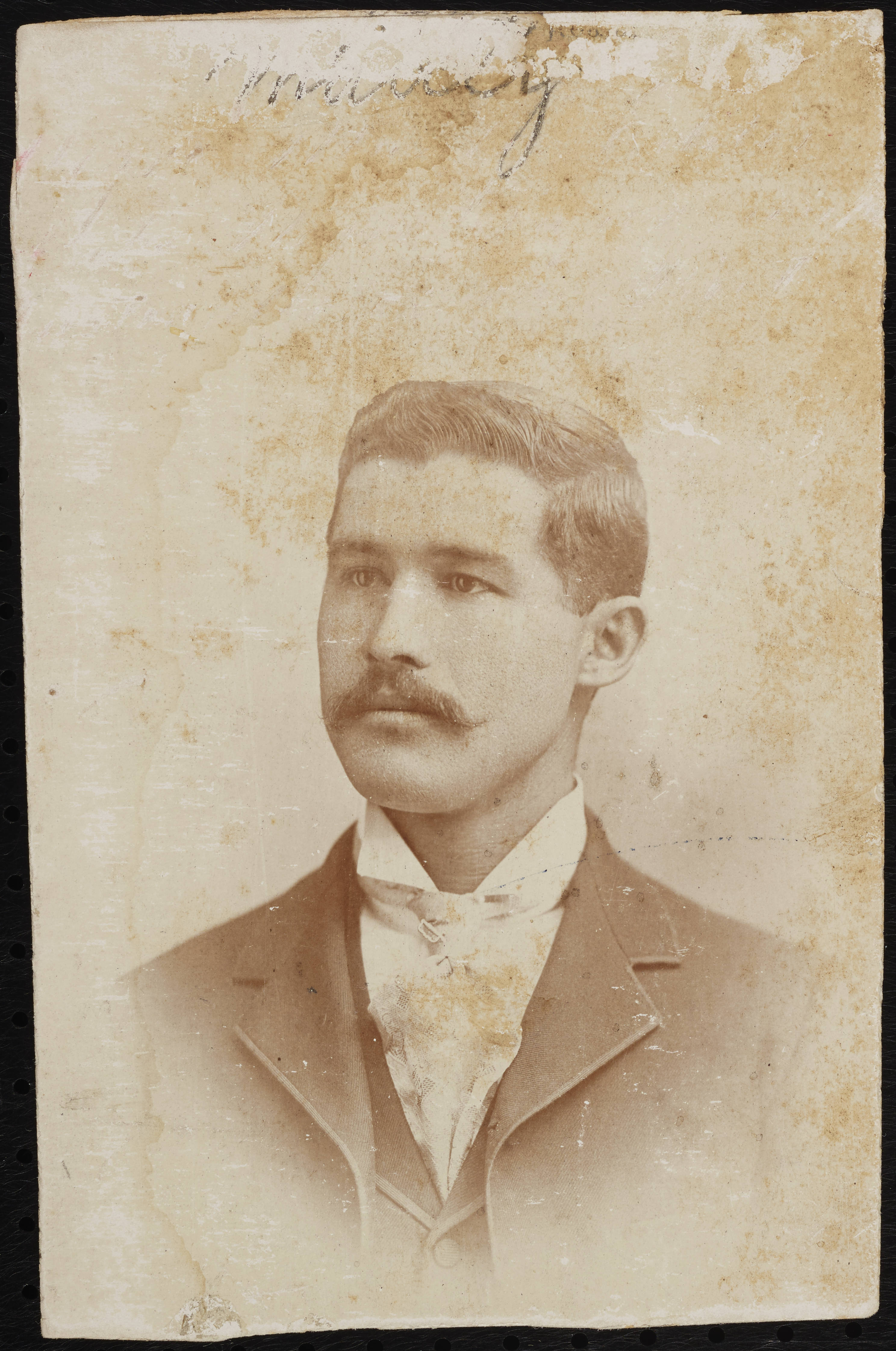
- Born: Alexander Lightfoot Manly; May 13, 1866; Near Raleigh, North Carolina, U.S.
- Died: October 5, 1944 (aged 78); Philadelphia, Pennsylvania, U.S.
- Education: Hampton Institute
- Occupations: Journalist; editor; activist
- Known for: Editor of the Daily Record; figure in the Wilmington massacre of 1898
- Political party: Republican
- Spouse: Caroline Sadgwar (m. 1900)
- Children: 2
- Relatives: Charles Manly (grandfather)

Alexander Lightfoot Manly (May 13, 1866 – October 5, 1944) was an American newspaper owner and editor who lived in Wilmington, North Carolina. With his brother, Frank G. Manly, as co-owner, he published the Daily Record, the state's only daily African-American newspaper and possibly the nation's only black-owned daily newspaper. At the time, the port of Wilmington had 10,000 residents and was the state's largest city; its population was majority black, with a rising middle class.

In August 1898 Manly published an editorial objecting to lynchings and rejected stereotypes of black men as rapists of white women. He had earlier responded to a Rebecca Latimer Felton in Georgia who wrote about African-American males having relationships with white women. At the time, white Democrats were inflaming racial tensions and promoting white supremacy in a bid to regain power in the state legislature. They had lost control in the 1894 and 1896 elections to "fusion" candidates supported by a Republican and Populist coalition; these voters also elected Republican Daniel L. Russell as governor in 1896. When biracial fusionist candidates were elected to Wilmington's mayor and council, a secret committee of Democrats conducted the only successful coup d'état in United States history, the Wilmington massacre of 1898, and overturned the city government. They also ran the Manly brothers out of town, threatening their lives; a large mob destroyed the printing press and burned down the newspaper offices; out of control, it also attacked black neighborhoods, killing an estimated 30-100 people and destroying much of what freedmen had built in the city.

The Manly brothers were among the 2,100 blacks who permanently moved out of Wilmington after the riot, resulting in its becoming a majority-white city. The brothers moved briefly to Washington, D.C., helped by former Congressman George Henry White. He had moved to the city permanently after North Carolina passed legislation in 1899 to disenfranchise blacks in the state. Alex married Caroline Sadgwar at his house. Alex Manly and his wife moved to Philadelphia, where they had a family. Frank Manly moved to Alabama and taught at Tuskegee University. Alex Manly supported his family as a painter, but remained politically active; he helped found The Armstrong Association, a precursor to the National Urban League, and was a member of the African-American newspaper council.

== Early life ==
Alexander Lightfoot Manly, called "Alex", was born in 1866 in Raleigh, North Carolina. Both of his parents were of mixed ancestry: his father was a freedman who, like many African Americans, possessed African ancestry and European ancestry, while his mother was a free woman of color of mixed European ancestry and African ancestry. Through his father's paternal line, Manly was a descendant of Governor Charles Manly and Corinne Manly, who was enslaved by the Governor. Among his siblings were brothers Frank G. and much younger Thomas Manly.

After attending local schools, Alex Manly attended Hampton University, a historically black college in Virginia. He later moved to Wilmington, where he taught Sunday school at Chestnut Street Presbyterian Church.

== Professional career ==
In 1895, Manly became the owner and editor of the Wilmington Daily Record, the only daily African-American newspaper in the state and possibly the nation. He shared ownership with his brother Frank G. Manly. The progressive newspaper was for blacks in the Wilmington community, and it was heralded as "The Only Negro Daily in the World". The Daily Record advocated for black civil rights, better health-care, roads, and bicycle paths. Its success attracted white advertisers, and the newspaper and its editors were well respected in Wilmington.

== Political background ==
Wilmington then had a majority-black population. Statewide, the Republican Party had mostly black members. In 1894 and 1896, the state had three active parties: fusion candidates of the allied Republican and Populist parties (which were respectively composed of mostly black and white members) gained control of the state legislature in the elections, defeating the Democrats. In 1896, Republican Daniel L. Russell was elected as governor as a Fusionist candidate, the first Republican since Reconstruction. In 1898 the fusionist legislature passed a law to expand the franchise for the first time since Reconstruction by lowering property requirements, which benefited the white majority of the state as well as black voters.

But, the Democrats worked to regain political control of the legislature and the state. In 1897 they generated rhetoric about miscegenation to curry votes in the next election cycle. In 1898, they continued to inflame white racial fears and campaigned for white supremacy, suggesting "the Democratic citizenry [should] overthrow political domination and control of the Negro".

== 1897–1898 editorials ==
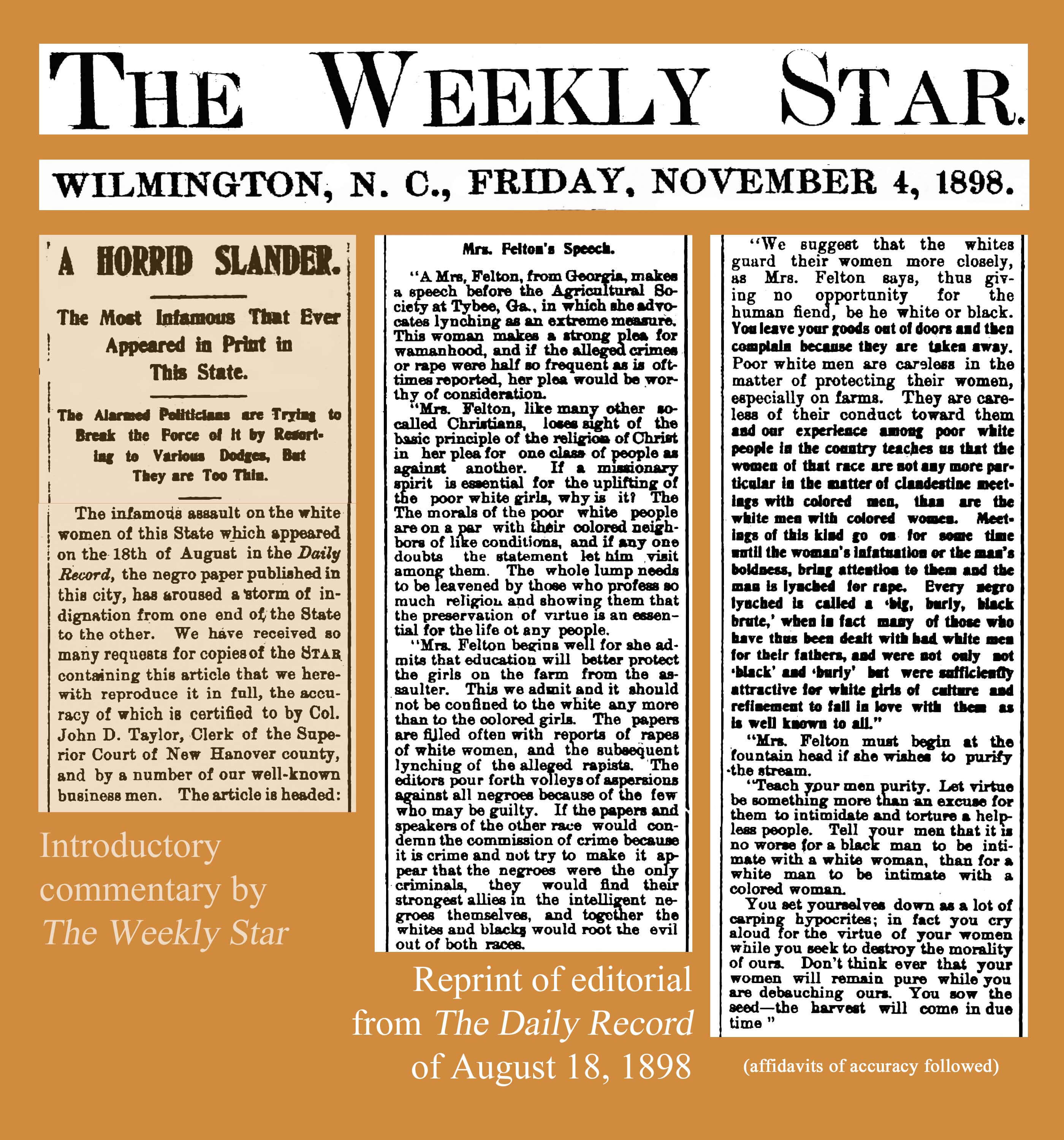
On August 11, 1898, Mrs. W. H. Felton delivered a speech asserting that, given the inability of the church or courts to protect white women from "the ravening human beasts—then I say lynch; a thousand times a week if necessary." Felton's speech was the subject of Manly's August 18 Daily Record rebuttal editorial (reprint shown here). Manly's editorial was used as a pretext for the Wilmington massacre of November 1898.

Mrs. Rebecca Felton of Georgia gave a speech before the Agricultural Society at Tybee Island, Georgia, in which she spoke out in favor of broad use of lynching of African-American men in order to "protect" white women from the sexual attentions of Black men. Clawson published her speech in the Wilmington Messenger.

Manly responded in an August 18, 1898, editorial in his Daily Record, saying that white men were hypocrites for protecting their white women while seeking to "destroy the morality of ours." He noted that whites had long preyed sexually on black women, both during slavery and since the Civil War, as white men often held economic and political power over black women in the segregated society.

He generated great controversy by referring openly to miscegenation in South Carolina society, noting flaws in the white double standard of assuming that all relationships of black men with white women were sexually coercive. He said that consensual relationships took place between white women and black men, but when these relationships attracted public attention, white people called it rape. Referring to another social fact that many whites wanted to ignore, he said that many "black" men were in fact biracial, with white fathers who themselves had liaisons with African American women. Alluding to studies by black journalist Ida B. Wells, he therefore argued that the stereotype of the "Big Burly Black Brute" punished in lynchings was incorrect: many were "sufficiently attractive for white girls of culture and refinement to fall in love with them, as is very well-known to all.", and many were, scandalously, fathered by White men, a fact that meant interracial liaisons were also dealt by White men.

"If the papers and speakers of the other race would condemn the commission of the crime because it is crime and not try to make it appear that the Negroes were the only criminals, they would find their strongest allies in the intelligent Negroes themselves; and together the whites and blacks would root the evil out of both races... Tell your men that it is no worse for a black man to be intimate with a white woman than for the white man to be intimate with a colored woman. You set yourselves down as a lot of carping hypocrites in fact you cry aloud for the virtue of your women while you seek to destroy the morality of ours. Don’t ever think that your women will remain pure while you are debauching ours. You sow the seed — the harvest will come in due time."

== Racial tensions ==
Manly's opinion piece was republished in white papers, including the Wilmington News and The News and Observer in Raleigh. It also gained national attention, in a year when North Carolina racial tensions were already high, inflamed by the Democratic campaigns for the pending election. Democrats were promoting white supremacy and exaggerating racial fears related to miscegenation to bring out their supporters. Manly's comments about interracial relationships were controversial and unwelcome in the segregated society, although most in the white community were well aware of the many relationships that white men had with black women, including some men who kept second families with their mixed-race children. Thomas Clawson, a white local businessman and editor of The Wilmington Messenger, claimed that Manly's editorial "made Wilmington seethe with uncontrollable indignation, bitterness, and rage." Critics described Manly's article as slanderous and degrading to white women.

=== Political tensions ===
Democrats capitalized on Manly's editorial, claiming that "as long as fusion remains, Negro men would continue preying on white women". Clawson published Manly's article daily in his newspaper in the weeks leading up to the November 9th election and other newspapers also repeatedly published it in the two months leading up to the election. Additionally, Democrats carried copies of Manly's editorial with them to generate controversy in conversations and to strengthen their appeal. The editorial became so controversial that the struggling Republicans claimed that the Democrats, not Manly, had written it.

Democrats were successful in regaining control of the state legislature in the election on November 9, 1898. Much of the state was watching the outcome of elections in Wilmington, the largest city and with a majority-black population. A secret committee of white Democrats led by Alfred Waddell had already planned the Wilmington massacre of 1898 if they lost local offices and control of the city government. In 1898 a biracial fusion ticket won the mayor's office and control of the city council: the mayor and two-thirds of the aldermen were white. Democrats initiated their insurrection.

=== Wilmington massacre ===
Democrats were determined to overthrow the city government after losing the election. A group of white supremacists, known as the Committee of Twenty-five, first decided to remove publisher Manly from Wilmington by force. They also had already identified numerous black leaders whom they wanted to expel from the city, including the Manly brothers. The Committee gave leaders of the black community an ultimatum: the Manly brothers would have to be gone from the city by 10 A.M. on November 10, or else they would be forcefully removed.

But on the night of November 9, a "pre-arranged lynching party" went to the Daily Record to find Manly. They had declared him an outlaw to be killed on sight. The brothers fled town that night. While there is debate about how Alex and Frank Manly left Wilmington, by November 10, the brothers had left the city. A large white mob of more than 1500 people destroyed the printing press and burned the offices of the Daily Record to the ground, and went on to massacre many of the towns black citizens in what would later be known as the Wilmington 1898 Coup d'état and Massacre.

Manly sought shelter with black U.S. Congressman George Henry White from North Carolina. For a time, Manly served in his office and wrote civil rights legislation, which White was unable to get through Congress.

== Personal life and later career ==
Manly and his brother Frank moved to Washington, D.C., in 1900. Frank Manly eventually moved to Alabama, where he taught at Tuskegee University, a noted historically black college.

While in the capital, Alex Manly married his fiancée Caroline Sadgwar (also referred to as Carrie Sadgwar), a graduate of Fisk University and a member of the Fisk Jubilee Singers. Sadgwar was the daughter of Frederick Cutlar Sadgwar, a prominent businessman in Wilmington's African-American community and his Cherokee wife; her paternal great-grandfather was a French sea captain. She had become engaged to Manly in Wilmington. N.C., and the couple were wed at the home of North Carolina Congressman George Henry White, who had moved permanently to Washington, D.C., after North Carolina passed a suffrage amendment in 1899 that created barriers to voter registration and excluded most black voters from the political system. White had announced that he would not run for a third term under such conditions, and instead built a law practice in the capital and also became a highly successful banker. In 1906, he moved to Philadelphia, where he founded a bank, and a black residential community in New Jersey.

David became a carpenter, and taught his trade to Frederick. After the war Frederick completed his education at Lincoln University, a historically black college in Pennsylvania. He returned to Wilmington and developed as a leader in the business community.

Together, the Manlys moved from Washington, D.C., to Philadelphia. They had two sons born in Philadelphia: Milo and Lewin. The former became an activist and fought for black property rights in Wilmington; he later became executive director of the Pennsylvania Human Relations Commission.

In Philadelphia, Alex Manly became a member of an African-American newspaper council. He helped found The Armstrong Association, a precursor to the National Urban League. He suffered from losing his newspaper and worked as a painter to support his family.

His sons were marked by the family's losses as well, and descendants have said the family frequently talked about "what might have been" if Alex Manly had not been run out of Wilmington and lost his newspaper business. But Manly and his descendants persisted and were described as "among Philadelphia's most industrious and civic-minded citizens." Lewin Manly was less successful than his brother. He did not finish college and worked as a waiter in Savannah, Georgia. He married but was later divorced. But his namesake son, Lewin Manly Jr., became a successful dentist. When a Commission was appointed to study the Wilmington massacre of 1898, Lewin Manly Jr. was among those who favored compensation to descendants of victims for property and economic losses.

== Legacy ==
- In 1994, the site of Manly's newspaper, Daily Record, was marked by a historical plaque that includes information about him and the insurrection of 1898, noted as a turning point in state history.
- A small collection of Manly's papers, including photographs of him and his brother, and his wife and son Milo, is held at East Carolina University.
- Manly is discussed in The North Carolina Election of 1898, Southern Historical Collection at the University of North Carolina at Chapel Hill.
