= John M. Brower =

American politician (1845–1913)

Member of the U.S. House of Representatives from North Carolina's 5th district
- In office March 4, 1887 – March 3, 1891
- Preceded by: James W. Reid
- Succeeded by: Archibald H. A. Williams

Personal details
- Born: John Morehead Brower; July 29, 1845 Greensboro, North Carolina
- Died: August 5, 1913 (aged 68) Paris, Texas
- Resting place: Oakdale Cemetery, Mt. Airy, North Carolina
- Party: Republican
- Occupation: merchant, businessman

John Morehead Brower (July 19, 1845 – August 5, 1913) was an American farmer and agriculture merchant who served two terms as a Representative from North Carolina from 1887 to 1891.

== Early life and education ==
Brower was born in Greensboro, Guilford County, North Carolina on July 19, 1845, but soon moved to Surry County with his parents, who settled in Mount Airy in 1845. He was educated by private tutors and attended the Mount Airy Male Academy and engaged in agricultural pursuits, the raising and processing of tobacco, and mercantile pursuits.

== Political career ==
Brower was delegate to all Republican State conventions from 1872 to 1896 and a member of the North Carolina State Senate from 1876 to 1878.

=== Congress ===
He was elected as a Republican to the Fiftieth and Fifty-first Congresses (March 4, 1887 – March 3, 1891), where he was chairman of the Committee on Expenditures in the Post Office Department (Fifty-first Congress).

He was an unsuccessful candidate for reelection in 1890 to the Fifty-second Congress.

=== Return to state legislature ===
Browser then became a member of the North Carolina House of Representatives from 1896 to 1898, later resuming his former agricultural and business pursuits.

== Later career ==
Brower moved to Oklahoma and settled in Boswell, Choctaw County, in 1907 and engaged in the manufacture of lumber, agricultural pursuits, and stock raising.

== Death and burial ==
He died in Paris, Lamar County, Texas, August 5, 1913 and was interred in Oakdale Cemetery, Mount Airy, North Carolina.

U.S. House of Representatives
Preceded by James W. Reid	Member of the U.S. House of Representatives from North Carolina's 6th congressional district 1887–1891	Succeeded by Archibald H. A. Williams
