= Thomas Settle (1865–1919) =

American politician

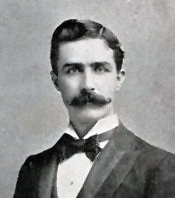

Member of the U.S. House of Representatives from North Carolina's 5th district
- In office March 4, 1893 – March 3, 1897
- Preceded by: Archibald H.A. Williams
- Succeeded by: William W. Kitchin

Personal details
- Born: March 10, 1865 near Wentworth, North Carolina, U.S.
- Died: January 20, 1919 (aged 53) Asheville, North Carolina, U.S.
- Resting place: Oakdale Cemetery
- Party: Republican
- Education: Georgetown University
- Occupation: lawyer

Thomas Settle (March 10, 1865 – January 20, 1919) was an American lawyer who served for two terms as a member of the U.S. House of Representatives from North Carolina from 1893 to 1897. A Republican, he was the son of Thomas Settle, a judge and politician in North Carolina, and a grandson of Thomas Settle (1789–1857), also a U.S. Representative from North Carolina.

== Biography ==
Thomas Settle was born near Wentworth, Rockingham County, N.C., on March 10, 1865. He attended the public schools and Georgetown University, studied law in Greensboro; was admitted to the bar in 1885 and commenced practice in Wentworth.

=== Career ===
Settle served as solicitor of the ninth judicial district (1886–1894) before he was elected as a Republican to the Fifty-third and Fifty-fourth Congresses (March 4, 1893 – March 3, 1897).

Settle was chairman of the Committee on Expenditures on Public Buildings during the Fifty-fourth Congress. He was an unsuccessful candidate for reelection in 1896.

=== Career after Congress ===
He resumed the practice of law in Asheville, N.C.; was appointed by the Department of Justice as special attorney to the United States Court of Customs in New York City in 1909, and served in that capacity until 1910.

Like his father before him, Settle ran unsuccessfully for Governor of North Carolina. As the Republican nominee in 1912, he came in third behind winner Locke Craig and Progressive Party nominee Iredell Meares.

=== Death ===
Settle died in Asheville, NC, on January 20, 1919. He is buried in Oakdale Cemetery, Wilmington, N.C.

== Notes ==
Party political offices
Preceded by J. Elwood Cox	Republican nominee for Governor of North Carolina; 1912	Succeeded by Frank A. Linney
U.S. House of Representatives
Preceded by Archibald H.A. Williams	Member of the U.S. House of Representatives from North Carolina's 6th congressional district 1893–1897	Succeeded by William W. Kitchin
