= Iredell Meares =

North Carolina lawyer and politician

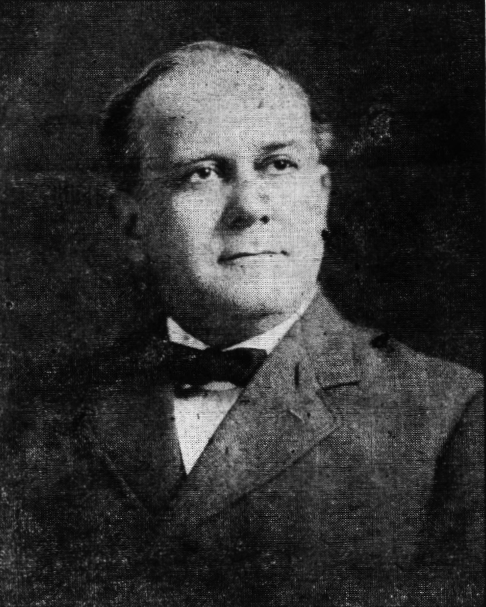

Iredell Meares (December 15, 1856 – September 15, 1931) was an American lawyer, public speaker, and politician in North Carolina. His obituary describes him as one of lower Cape Fear's most colorful characters.

== Early life ==
He was born in Raleigh, North Carolina into a prominent family. His family's finances were wrecked by the Civil War and father died in 1871.

A Democrat, he became an independent, then a Republican, and ran for governor as a Progressive.

He reportedly sent his co-counsel a poem in lieu of a fee. He served as deputy of customs in Wilmington. He testified on the proposed establishment of a Department of Education in Washington D.C. He was a lawyer for the Sentinels of the Republic.

He was a Progressive Party candidate in the 1912 North Carolina gubernatorial election. Later in his career he worked in Washington D.C.

He owned two Albert Rosenthal etchings, one of James Iredell.

He was married to Josephine Meares. They had a daughter. He died September 15, 1931 in Wilmington, North Carolina.

== Writings ==
- "An Address on the Administration of the Law; Delivered at the Laying of the Corner-stone of the New Courthouse for New Hanover County, at Wilmington, N.C., April 21st, 1892"
- "Mix Brains and Ballots; Day for Intellectual Voting" (1908)
- "Bank Deposit Guaranty; An Opposition View" (1908)
- "Mr. Taft's Judicial Decisions as They Relate to the Brotherhood of Locomotive Engineers and Labor Strikes" (1908)
- "Is the South to be Humiliated?; An Appeal to Southern Manhood" (1908)
- "Presidents who Have Visited Wilmington, N.C.; Washington, Monroe, Polk, Fillmore, Taft : Souvenir, November 9, 1909"
- "God Not in the Covenant; The League of Nations Doomed on the Day the Conference Met" (1920)
- The Trading with the Enemy Act; As Enacted and Amended, with Annotations : Addendum and Appendix Comprising Data Relating to the Act Star Publishing 1924

== See also ==
- Wilmington massacre
