= Thomas Settle (1789–1857) =

American politician (1789–1857)

Member of the U.S. House of Representatives from North Carolina's 9th district

Thomas Settle (March 9, 1789 – August 5, 1857) was a Congressional Representative from North Carolina from 1817 to 1821.

Settle was born near Reidsville, North Carolina, March 9, 1789; educated by private tutors; studied law; was admitted to the bar in 1812 and commenced practice in Wentworth, North Carolina. He was elected to the State House of Commons in 1816; elected as a Republican to the Fifteenth and Sixteenth Congresses (March 4, 1817 – March 3, 1821); declined to be a candidate for reelection in 1820. Settle resumed the practice of law, was again a member of the State House of Commons, from c. 1826–1829, and served as speaker in the last session. Later, Settle served as a judge of the superior court of North Carolina from 1832 to 1857. He died in Rockingham County, North Carolina, August 5, 1857; interment in the Settle family graveyard, near Reidsville, N.C.

His son was also named Thomas Settle (1831–1888), as was his grandson, Thomas Settle III. David Settle Reid was his nephew. His daughter, Henrietta Williams Settle, married his nephew, David Settle Reid.

== See also ==
- Fifteenth United States Congress
- Sixteenth United States Congress

U.S. House of Representatives
Preceded by Bartlett Yancey	Member of the U.S. House of Representatives from North Carolina's 9th congressional district March 4, 1817 – March 3, 1821	Succeeded by Romulus M. Saunders
