= Charles Manly =

American lawyer and politician from North Carolina (1795–1871)

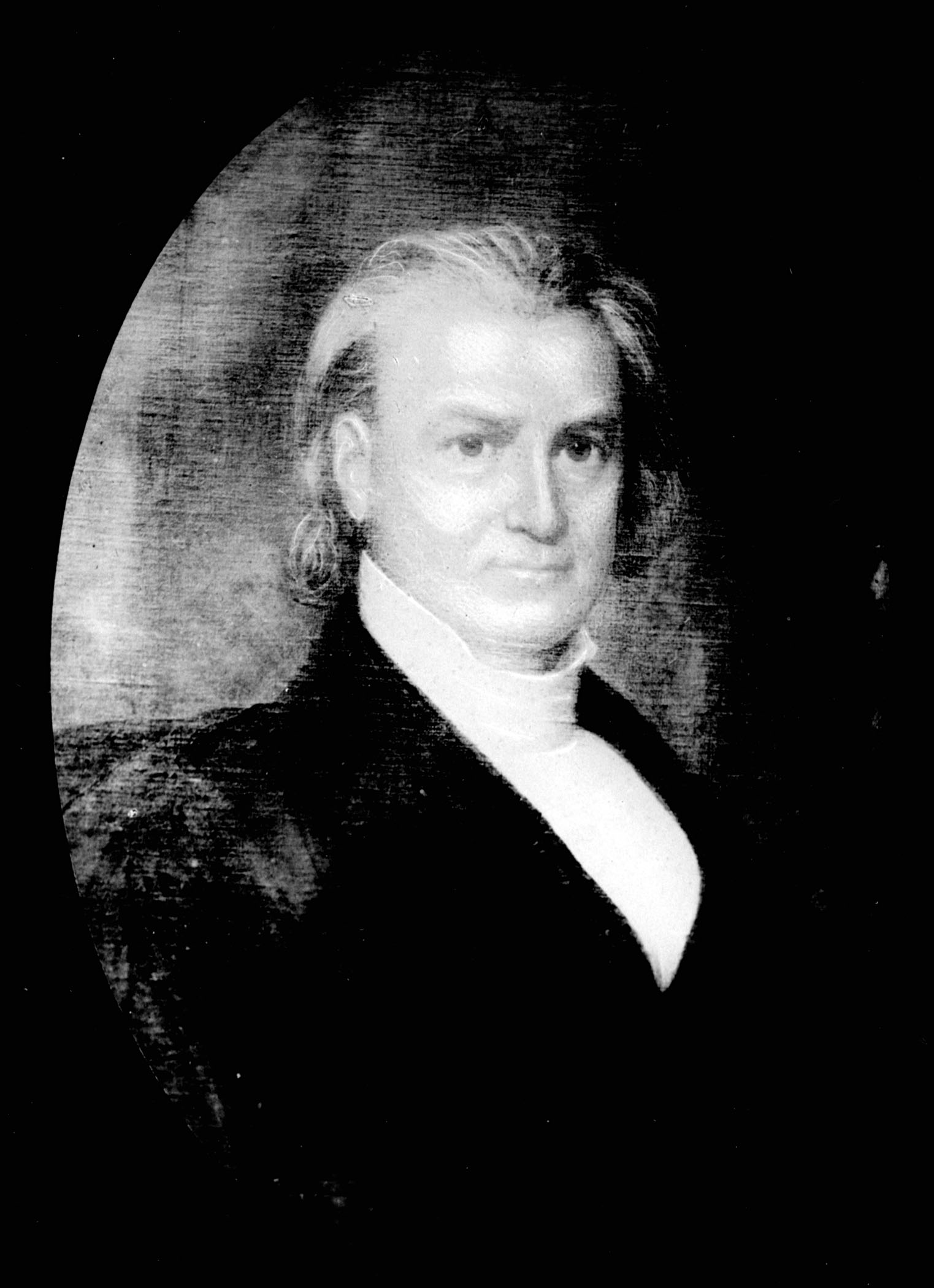

31st Governor of North Carolina
- In office January 1, 1849 – January 1, 1851
- Preceded by: William Alexander Graham
- Succeeded by: David Settle Reid

Personal details
- Born: May 13, 1795 Chatham County, North Carolina, U.S.
- Died: May 1, 1871 (aged 75) Raleigh, North Carolina, U.S.
- Party: Whig
- Education: University of North Carolina at Chapel Hill
- Profession: Lawyer

Charles Manly (May 13, 1795 – May 1, 1871) was a lawyer who served as the 31st governor of the U.S. state of North Carolina from 1849 to 1851. He was the last member of the Whig Party to hold the office. After one two-year term, Manly was defeated in the 1850 election by Democrat David S. Reid, whom Manly had defeated in 1848. He was the last sitting governor of North Carolina to lose re-election until Pat McCrory in 2016.

He was the brother of Matthias Evans Manly. He was also an ancestor of Alexander Manly, the African-American editor of the Wilmington Daily Record. He attended the University of North Carolina at Chapel Hill.

== Notes ==
Party political offices
Preceded by William Alexander Graham	Whig nominee for Governor of North Carolina; 1848, 1850	Succeeded by John Kerr Jr.
Political offices
Preceded by William Alexander Graham	Governor of North Carolina; 1849–1851	Succeeded by David Settle Reid
