= David Settle Reid =

American politician (1813–1891)

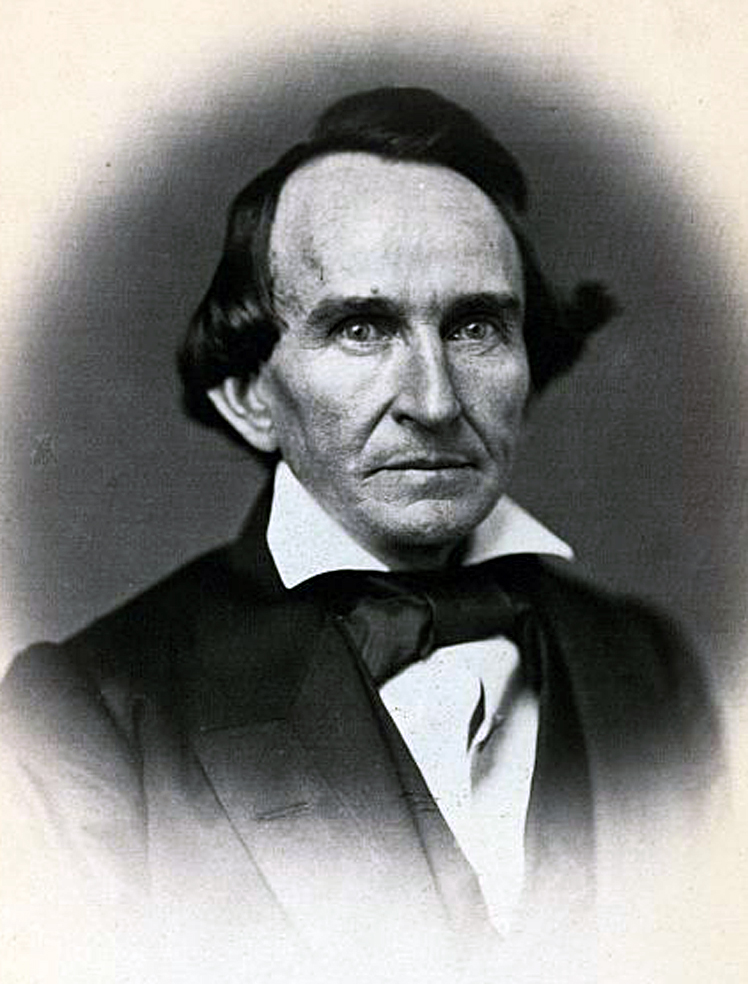

Member of the U.S. House of Representatives from North Carolina's 3rd district
- In office March 4, 1843 – March 4, 1847
- Preceded by: William Henry Washington
- Succeeded by: Daniel Moreau Barringer

32nd Governor of North Carolina
- In office January 1, 1851 – December 6, 1854
- Preceded by: Charles Manly
- Succeeded by: Warren Winslow

United States Senator from North Carolina
- In office December 6, 1854 – March 4, 1859
- Preceded by: Willie P. Mangum
- Succeeded by: Thomas Bragg

Member of the North Carolina Senate
- In office 1835–1842

Personal details
- Born: April 19, 1813 Rockingham County, North Carolina, US
- Died: June 19, 1891 (aged 78) Reidsville, North Carolina, US
- Party: Democratic
- Spouse: Henrietta Settle
- Relations: Reuben Reid (Father); Elizabeth Settle Reid (Mother)

David Settle Reid (April 19, 1813 – June 19, 1891) was the 32nd governor of the U.S. state of North Carolina from 1851 to 1854 and a U.S. senator from December 1854 to March 1859. His uncle and eventual father-in-law was Congressman Thomas Settle.

He was born in what would later be Reidsville, North Carolina, an unincorporated town named for his father, Reuben Reid. He had a brother, Hugh Kearns Reid. At age 16, David Reid became the first postmaster for the town. He studied law and was admitted to the bar in 1833. From 1835 to 1842, Reid served in the North Carolina Senate. He was a U.S. representative from 1843 to 1847. Reid ran for governor in 1848 as a long-shot candidate. In his campaign, Reid promoted the now-obscure cause of "free suffrage," i.e. that there should not be different standards for who could vote for members of the North Carolina House of Commons and of the North Carolina Senate. It was assumed that more voters would only increase the Whig domination of the state, but the Whigs denounced suffrage reform as "a system of communism unjust and Jacobinical." To everyone's surprise, Reid lost to Charles Manly by only 854 votes. In 1850, Reid defeated Manly by 2,853 votes, becoming the first elected Democratic governor of North Carolina. He was reelected Governor in 1852.

In the United States Senate, Reid was chairman of the Committee on Patents and the Patent Office. He sought but was denied a full term in the Senate when he lost a three-way internal party fight with Thomas Bragg and William W. Holden in 1858. He returned to the practice of law and was a delegate to the ill-fated 1861 Washington Peace Conference to try to prevent the American Civil War. Reid was a member of a state constitutional convention in 1875. In the early 1870s Reid moved from his farm on the Dan River to the nearby seat of Rockingham County Wentworth where he continued to practice law and was respected as an elder statesman of the Democratic Party.

In May 1881 Reid suffered a serious stroke at Wentworth and was soon moved to his elder son's Reidsville home where he died in June 1891 and was buried in nearby Greenview Cemetery. His widow and first cousin, Henrietta Settle Reid, died in 1913 and was buried by her husband. None of the few remaining descendants of David Settle Reid live today in his native Rockingham County.

Party political offices
Preceded by James B. Shepard	Democratic nominee for Governor of North Carolina; 1848, 1850, 1852	Succeeded by Thomas Bragg
U.S. House of Representatives
Preceded by William H. Washington	Member of the U.S. House of Representatives from North Carolina's 3rd congressional district March 4, 1843 – March 4, 1847	Succeeded by Daniel M. Barringer
Political offices
Preceded by Charles Manly	Governor of North Carolina; 1851–1854	Succeeded by Warren Winslow
U.S. Senate
Preceded by Willie Mangum	U.S. senator (Class 2) from North Carolina; 1854–1859; Served alongside: George Badger, Asa Biggs and Thomas Clingman	Succeeded by Thomas Bragg
