= 1994 Oregon Ballot Measure 13 =

Referendum on gay rights

Results by county: No: 50–60%; 60–70%; Yes: 50–60%; 60–70%

Ballot Measure 13 (1994) was a ballot measure in the U.S. State of Oregon in 1994 concerning gay rights, spousal benefits, access to information, and public education. Measure 13 would have added a new section titled "The Minority Status and Child Protection Act" to Article 1 of the Oregon Constitution. It was defeated in the November 8, 1994 general election with 592,746 votes in favor and 630,628 against.

== History ==
=== Political context ===
Backed by the Oregon Citizens' Alliance (OCA), this ballot measure was the third statewide measure in Oregon that sought to restrict gay rights. It was similar to Oregon Ballot Measure 9, which was also backed by the OCA and was defeated in 1992. This new measure lacked some of the language of the 1992 measure, which described homosexuality as "abnormal, wrong, unnatural and perverse" and compared homosexuality to sadism and pedophilia, but the OCA and opponents of the measure said that it would have virtually the same effect if it were passed.

The neighboring state of Idaho had a similar ballot measure in the same year: 1994 Idaho Proposition 1. The principal sponsor of Proposition 1 was the Idaho Citizens Alliance, an offshoot of the OCA.

== Full text ==
Be It Enacted by the People of the State of Oregon:

The Constitution of the State of Oregon is amended by creating a new section to be added to and made a part of Article 1. The new section shall be known as "The Minority Status and Child Protection Act" and will read as follows:

Section 41: MINORITY STATUS BASED ON HOMOSEXUALITY PROHIBITED.

(1) In the State of Oregon, including all political subdivisions and government units, minority status shall not apply to homosexuality; therefore, affirmative action, quotas, special class status or special classifications such as "sexual orientation," "domestic partnerships" or similar designations shall not be established on the basis of homosexuality.

(2) Children, students and employees shall not be advised, instructed or taught by any government agency, department or political unit in the State of Oregon that homosexuality is the legal equivalent of race, color, gender, age or national origin; nor shall public funds be expended in a manner that has the purpose or effect of promoting or expressing approval of homosexuality.

(a) The State of Oregon, political subdivisions and all units of state and local government shall not grant marital status or spousal benefits on the basis of homosexuality.

(b) The State of Oregon, political subdivisions and all units of state and local government, with regard to public employees, shall generally consider private lawful sexual behaviors as non-job related factors, provided such factors do not disrupt the workplace and that such consideration does not violate subsections (1) and (2).

(c) Though subsections (1) and (2) are established and in effect, no unit of state or local government shall deny to private persons business licenses, permits or services otherwise due under existing statutes; nor deprive, nullify, or diminish the holding or exercise of any rights guaranteed by the Constitution of the State of Oregon or the Constitution of the United States of America.

(d) Though subsections (1) and (2) are established and in effect, this section shall not limit the availability in public libraries of books and materials written for adults which address homosexuality, provided access to such materials is limited to adults and meets local standards as established through the existing library review process.

(3) The PEOPLE INTEND, that if any part of this enactment be found unconstitutional, the remaining parts shall survive in full force and effect. This Section shall be in all parts self-executing.

== Reception ==
State senator Jim Bunn spoke in support of Measure 13.

The Portland Gay Men's Chorus toured in protest of the measure, just two years after their previous protest tour against 1992 Oregon Ballot Measure 9. Suzanne B. Goldberg of Lambda Legal said that the measure would have been a violation of the equal-protection clause of the 14th amendment.

It ultimately failed by a 3% margin.

== See also ==
- Basic Rights Oregon
- Defense of Marriage Act
- LGBTQ Victory Fund
- List of Oregon ballot measures
  - 1994 Oregon Ballot Measure 11
  - 1994 Oregon Ballot Measure 16
  - 1994 Oregon Ballot Measure 19
  - 2004 Oregon Ballot Measure 36
- List of U.S. ballot initiatives to repeal LGBTQ anti-discrimination laws
- Romer v. Evans
