= Basic Rights Oregon =

U.S. nonprofit LGBTQ rights organization

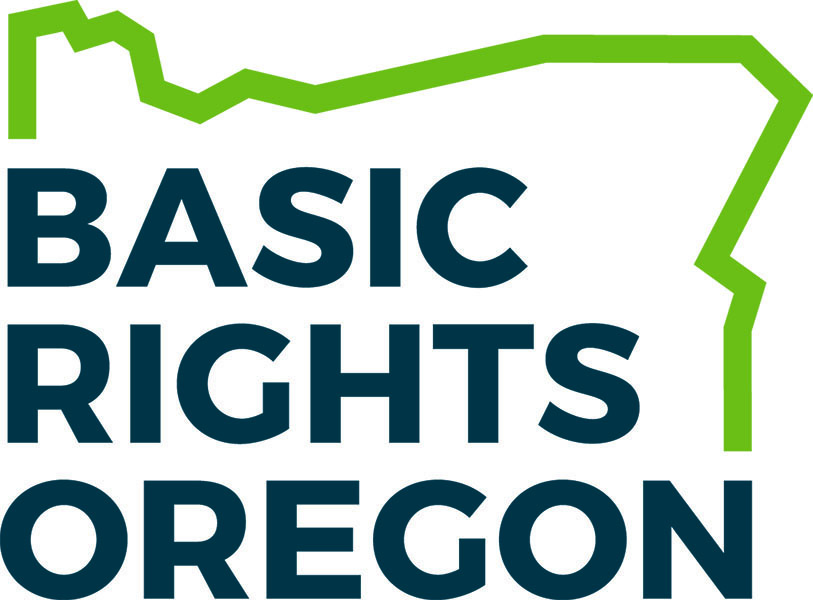
- Logo

- U.S. state of Oregon
- Abbreviation: BRO
- Formation: 1995; 31 years ago
- Type: 501(c)(4)
- Tax ID no.: EIN 93-1108531
- Headquarters: Portland, Oregon
- Region served: Oregon
- Executive director: Kyndall Mason
- Revenue: $377,166 USD (2024)
- Expenses: $237,805 USD (2024)
- Staff: 12 (2023)
- Volunteers: 60 (2023)
- Website: basicrights.org

Basic Rights Oregon (BRO) is an American nonprofit LGBTQ rights organization based in Portland, Oregon. It is the largest advocacy, education, and political organization working in Oregon to end discrimination based on sexual orientation and gender identity. Basic Rights Oregon has a full-time staff, a contract lobbyist, and more than 10,000 contributors, and 5,000 volunteers. It is a 501(c)(4) organization that maintains a 501(c)(3) education fund, a state candidate PAC, and a ballot measure PAC. The organization is a member of the Equality Federation.

== Background ==
Oregon Citizens Alliance (OCA), an organization that opposed LGBTQ rights, successfully backed the passage of a 1988 ballot measure revoking the ban on sexual-orientation discrimination in the state's executive branch. In 1992, when OCA proposed a ballot measure to prohibit the "encouragement" of homosexual lifestyles in public schools, Oregonians who supported LGBTQ rights raised over $2 million and were successful in defeating the measure. OCA continued to promote similar measures at the local level and promised another statewide ballot in 1994. In response activists pressured for a stable political organization and formed Support Our Communities-PAC (SOC-PAC) in 1993. The following year, SOC-PAC successfully organized the opposition to another OCA proposal, a ballot measure to ban the recognition of homosexuals as a minority group. Oregon Ballot Measure 9, in the year 2000, would have prevented any positive or neutral language from being used by educators or administrators in all Oregon public schools from kindergarten through Ph.D.

=== Advocacy ===
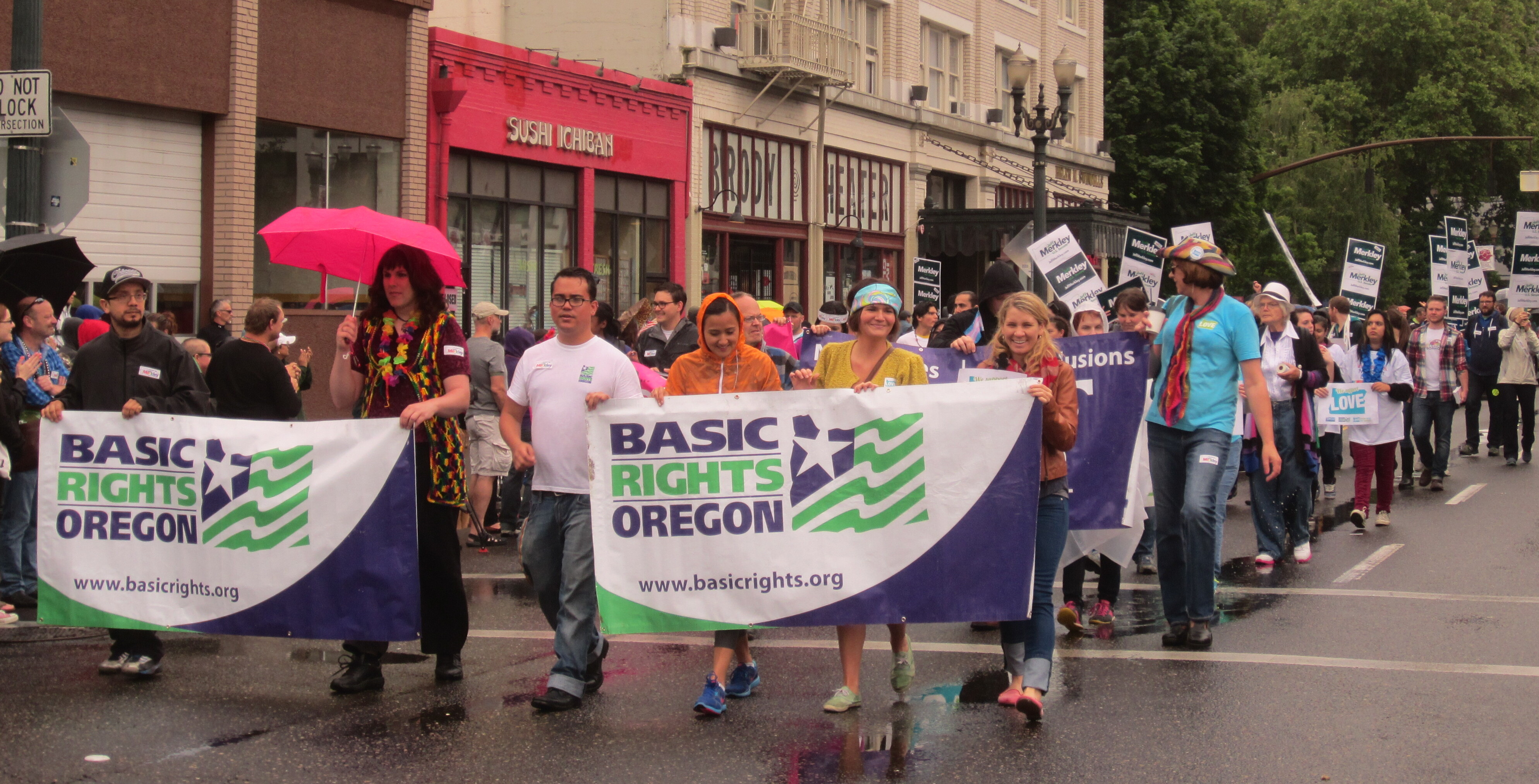
Basic Rights Oregon at the Portland Pride Festival, 2014

Basic Rights Oregon held its first meetings in 1995 and became a 501(c)(4) organization in 1996.

In 1999, BRO launched the Fair Workplace Project, which was designed to increase the number of employers voluntarily adopting nondiscrimination policies.

In 2002, BRO endorsed Democratic candidate Bill Bradbury for election to the United States Senate, opposing the Human Rights Campaign, a national LGBTQ rights organization, which endorsed the re-election of the Republican incumbent Gordon H. Smith.

In 2004, BRO, nine same-sex couples, the American Civil Liberties Union, and Multnomah County joined as plaintiffs against the State of Oregon, the Governor, the Attorney General, the Director of the Department of Human Services, and the State Registrar in a suit, Li v. State, in the Oregon Supreme Court seeking a declaration that the statutes (ORS chapter 106) prohibiting same-sex couples from marrying on the same terms as different-sex couples violated the Oregon Constitution.

In 2004, BRO worked against Ballot Measure 36, which amended the Oregon Constitution to prohibit same-sex marriage. Although BRO raised nearly $3 million to fight the measure, it passed with 57% in favor and 43% opposed. Following this loss, BRO hired its first team of field organizers and pushed nondiscrimination ordinances in Washington County, Bend, Hillsboro, and Wasco County.

In 2007, BRO led the lobbying effort to pass the Oregon Equality Act and the Oregon Family Fairness Act.

In 2012, following years of education and collaboration with BRO, the state Insurance Division issued a bulletin banning many private insurers from selling discriminatory policies in Oregon.

In 2015, in the wake of the Supreme Court ruling on Marriage Equality, BRO adopted a new strategic direction for 2015–2020. The new strategic direction seeks to center the voices of LGBTQ people of color, of rural and religious LGBTQ Oregonians, and of transgender and gender non-conforming Oregonians.

In 2015, Oregon became the third state to ban the discredited practice of conversion therapy on minors. BRO joined the effort begun by the Democratic Party of Oregon LGBTQ Caucus in 2013 to pass HB2307, the Youth Mental Health Protection Act, which was signed into law by Governor Kate Brown, then the nation's only out bisexual governor.

In 2017 Oregon passed HB 2673A - effective January 1, 2018 - simplifying the process for changing the name on a birth certificate, and also establishing a gender amendment process for transgender citizens. The revisions provide less expensive, more private and simpler transactions. The state's Department of Motor Vehicles (DMV) also changed its procedure for gender changes on IDs, allowing Oregonians to self-certify gender change without input from their health provider. Furthermore, effective July 1, 2017, the DMV made Oregon the first state in the country to recognize non-binary identities. The third marker on IDs is "X", for "not specified."

As of January 1, 2018, contractors working with the state of Oregon must have in place policies and practices which prohibit discrimination against their LGBTQ employees. The sponsor of the successful bill, HB 3060, was Rep. Ann Lininger. The measure also prevents state contractors from health care discrimination based on gender identity.

In 2023, BRO hosted a virtual event with Unicorn Solutions and the Oregon Department of Human Services (ODHS) to bring to light fostering LGBTQ+ youth in the foster system. ODHS is working in conjunction with BRO as well as the National Suicide Prevention, to hold events to educated families about fostering LGBTQ+ youth and educate people about rising LGBTQ+ suicide rates.

== See also ==
- LGBTQ rights in Oregon
- List of LGBT rights organizations
- Same-sex marriage in Oregon
