= List of U.S. ballot initiatives to repeal LGBTQ anti-discrimination laws =

Ballot initiatives to repeal LGBTQ anti-discrimination laws in the United States have been a recurring political strategy aimed at overturning legal protections for LGBTQ individuals at the state and local levels from 1974–2018. Ballot initiative efforts to repeal anti-discrimination laws on the basis of sexual orientation or sexual preference lasted from 1974–2016, while ballot initiative efforts to repeal anti-discrimination laws on the basis of gender identity and/or gender expression or gender presentation lasted from 2002–2018.

== History ==
Jurisdictions in the United States began outlawing discrimination on the basis of sexual orientation in 1972, when East Lansing, Michigan, passed an ordinance forbidding discrimination based on "affectional or sexual preference". In response, opponents began organizing campaigns to place measures on their local ballots to repeal these anti-discrimination laws. The repeal movement found a national spokesperson in Anita Bryant, who helped found—and served as president of—Save Our Children. Save Our Children organized in Florida in 1977 in response to the passage by the Dade County Commission of an anti-discrimination ordinance. Bryant's campaign was successful; the Miami-Dade ordinance was repealed by a greater than two-to-one margin. Repeal campaigns, building on this success, spread nationally and several other ordinances were repealed. In California in 1978, conservative state senator John Briggs sponsored Proposition 6, which would have barred gay and lesbian people from working in a public school. The defeat of this measure, and of an ordinance repeal measure in Seattle, Washington, the same day, stalled the momentum of the repeal forces.

Opponents of Colorado's Amendment 2 at a rally sponsored by the National Organization for Women

The mid-1980s and early 1990s saw a resurgence in ballot initiatives, culminating in proposed state constitutional amendments in Oregon and Colorado not only to repeal existing anti-discrimination ordinances but to proactively prohibit the state and any local unit of government within the state from ever passing such an ordinance. In 1992, Oregon's Measure 9 sponsored by the Oregon Citizens Alliance failed, but Colorado's Amendment 2 passed. Amendment 2 was declared unconstitutional by the United States Supreme Court in its 1996 Romer v. Evans decision. Oregon and two other states, Idaho and Maine, had initiatives between the passage of Amendment 2 and the Court decision; all three were defeated but many municipalities within Oregon passed local measures.

As the question of same-sex marriage has risen to greater prominence, opponents of such marriages have turned their attention to passing constitutional amendments barring individual states from legalizing same-sex marriages or recognizing such marriages performed in other jurisdictions. These amendments are listed here. Before the marriage issue arose, some jurisdictions had begun providing limited rights and benefits to same-sex domestic partners. These ordinances also became targets of repeal efforts, with repeal supporters meeting with less success.

Since the 2015 US Supreme Court ruling in the case of Obergefell v. Hodges, the prominence of LGBT anti-discrimination laws became the top priority of LGBT rights activists. One of the most controversial, recent, and largest repeal effort was Proposition 1 in Houston, Texas.

== Ballot initiatives ==
=== Statewide level ===
The first attempt to restrict gay and lesbian rights through a state wide ballot measure occurred in 1978 in California. While the measure failed, the late-1980s and early 1990s saw a resurgence in ballot initiatives, culminating in proposed state constitutional amendments in Oregon and Colorado not only to repeal existing anti-discrimination ordinances but to proactively prohibit the state and any local unit of government within the state from ever passing such an ordinance. Oregon's Measure 9, sponsored by the Oregon Citizens Alliance, failed, but Colorado's Amendment 2 passed. Amendment 2 was declared unconstitutional by the United States Supreme Court in its 1996 Romer v. Evans decision. Oregon and two other states, Idaho and Maine, had initiatives between the passage of Amendment 2 and the Court decision; all three were defeated but many municipalities within Oregon passed local measures.

Election date	State	Goal	Outcome
November 7, 1978	California	Proposition 6, to ban gays and lesbians from working in California's public schools.	Defeated with 58.43% of the vote.
November 8, 1988	Oregon	Measure 8: “Revokes ban on sexual orientation discrimination in state executive branch.” The measure was aimed at Governor Neil Goldschmidt’s executive order (EO-87-20), which prohibited employment discrimination within the executive branch based on sexual orientation, both in hiring and the performance of job duties.	Passed. Yes: 626,751 (52.75%) No: 561,355 (47.25%) Overturned by the Oregon Court of Appeals on November 12, 1992.
November 3, 1992	Colorado	Amendment 2, to repeal all gay rights ordinances within the state and to prevent the state or any political subdivision from passing new gay rights ordinances	Passed with 53.2% of the vote. Later struck down by the United States Supreme Court in Romer v. Evans.
November 3, 1992	Oregon	Measure 9. Would amend the Oregon Constitution to prohibit the state, counties, and municipalities from legally recognizing homosexuality as a minority status, and prohibit the passing of anti-discrimination laws based on sexual orientation; prohibit the state, counties, and municipalities from using public funds and properties to “promote, encourage, or facilitate homosexuality;” and require state, county, and municipal agencies, specifically the Oregon Department of Education, to “assist in setting a standard for Oregon’s youth that recognizes homosexuality, pedophilia, sadism and masochism as abnormal, wrong, unnatural, and perverse and that these behaviors are to be discouraged and avoided.”	Defeated. Yes: 638,527 (43.53%) No: 828,290 (56.47%)
November 8, 1994	Oregon	Measure 13: “SUMMARY: Amends state Constitution. Governments cannot: create classifications based on homosexuality; advise or teach children, students, employees that homosexuality equates legally or socially with race, other protected classifications; spend public funds in manner promoting or expressing approval of homosexuality; grant spousal benefits, marital status based on homosexuality; deny constitutional rights, services due under existing statutes.; Measure nonetheless allows adult library books addressing homosexuality with adult-only access. Public employees’ private lawful sexual behaviors may be cause for personnel action, if those behaviors disrupt workplace.”	Defeated. Yes: 592,746 (48.45%) No: 630,628 (51.55%)
November 8, 1994	Idaho	Proposition 1, to forbid state and local governments from granting minority status and rights based on homosexual behavior.	Defeated with 50.1% of the vote.
November 7, 1995	Maine	Question 1, to ban the state and local governments from passing anti-discrimination ordinances	Defeated with 53% of the vote.
November 3, 1998	Maine	To repeal state's gay rights law	Passed with 52% of the vote.
November 7, 2000	Oregon	Measure 9: This was the third and final unsuccessful ballot initiative by the OCA to attempt to discourage homosexuality at a statewide level.	Defeated by 52.89%
November 7, 2000	Maine	To repeal state's gay rights law	Passed.
November 8, 2005	Maine	To repeal state's gay rights law	Defeated by 57% of the vote.
November 6, 2018	Massachusetts	To repeal state's 2016 transgender rights law that forbids discrimination in public accommodations (including bathrooms and locker rooms)	Defeated by 67.82% of the vote.

=== Local level ===
After failing to pass Measure 9 in 1992, OCA turned its attention to passing anti-discrimination bans at the county and municipal level. Couching the debate in terms of forbidding LGBT people from receiving so-called "special rights", OCA sought not only to block ordinances in these communities but to bar them from spending money to "promote homosexuality". OCA was successful in passing over two dozen initiatives. However, in 1993 the Oregon Legislative Assembly passed a law prohibiting local governments from considering LGBT rights measures so the ordinances had no legal force. The Oregon Court of Appeals upheld the state law in 1995. Two weeks after the United States Supreme Court ruled in Romer, OCA suspended its efforts for a third statewide ballot initiative.

Election date	Locale	Goal	Outcome
1974	Boulder, Colorado	Placed on the ballot by the Boulder city council after passage of a gay rights ordinance met with public outcry	Passed with 83% of the vote.
June 7, 1977	Miami-Dade County, Florida	To repeal the county's gay rights ordinance	Passed with 69.3% of the vote.
April 25, 1978	St. Paul, Minnesota	To repeal the city's gay rights ordinance	Passed with 63.1% of the vote.
May 9, 1978	Wichita, Kansas	To repeal the city's gay rights ordinance	Passed with 80% of the vote.
May 23, 1978	Eugene, Oregon	To repeal the city's gay rights ordinance	Passed with 64.3% of the vote.
November 7, 1978	Seattle, Washington	To repeal the city's gay rights ordinance	Defeated with 62.9% of the vote.
June 3, 1980	Santa Clara County, California	To repeal the county's gay rights ordinance	Passed with 70.2% of the vote.
June 3, 1980	San Jose, California	To repeal the city's gay rights ordinance	Passed with 75.2% of the vote.
1982	Austin, Texas	To repeal the city's gay rights ordinance in housing	Defeated with 63% of the vote.
1984	Duluth, Minnesota	To repeal the city's gay rights ordinance	Passed with 76% of the vote.
1985	Houston, Texas	To repeal the city's gay rights ordinance	Passed with 82% of the vote.
1986	Davis, California	To repeal the city's gay rights ordinance	Defeated with 58% of the vote.
November 7, 1989	Athens, Ohio	To repeal the city's gay rights ordinance	Passed with 53% of the vote.
November 7, 1989	Irvine, California	To repeal the city's gay rights ordinance	Passed with 53% of the vote.
November 7, 1989	Concord, California	To repeal the city's gay rights ordinance	Passed with 50.2% of the vote.
November 7, 1989	Tacoma, Washington	To repeal the city's gay rights ordinance	Passed with 51.2% of the vote.
1990	Wooster, Ohio	To repeal the city's housing law	Passed with 63% of the vote.
May 21, 1991	Denver, Colorado	To repeal the city's gay rights ordinance	Defeated with 55% of the vote.
November 5, 1991	St. Paul, Minnesota	To repeal the city's gay rights ordinance	Defeated with 54% of the vote.
May 19, 1992	Corvallis, Oregon	Would prohibit the city from recognizing homosexuality, passing anti-discrimination laws based on homosexuality, and from using city funds and properties to "promote" homosexuality.	Failed with 63% voting against.
May 19, 1992	Springfield, Oregon	Would prohibit the city from recognizing homosexuality, passing anti-discrimination laws based on homosexuality, and from using city funds and properties to "promote" homosexuality.	Passed with 55.4% of the vote.
1993	Portsmouth, New Hampshire	To repeal the city's gay rights law	Passed.
November 2, 1993	Portland, Maine	To repeal the city's gay rights law	Defeated with 57% of the vote.
November 2, 1993	Tampa, Florida	To repeal the city's gay rights ordinance	Passed with almost 58.5% of the vote. However, the Florida Supreme Court later ruled that 462 signatures from the initiative petition were invalid and voided the repeal.
November 2, 1993	Cincinnati, Ohio	Ballot Issue 3, to prevent the city from enacting any gay rights ordinances.	Passed with 67% of the vote. Despite being worded almost identically to Colorado's Amendment 2, the Sixth Circuit Court of Appeals upheld the measure as constitutional in 1997. Cincinnati voters repealed Issue 3 in 2004.
November 2, 1993	Lewiston, Maine	To repeal a recently passed anti-discrimination ordinance	Passed with 68% of the vote.
May 18, 1993	Cornelius, Oregon	Measure 34-5: “SUMMARY: Amends City Charter. Prohibits City from extending minority status based on homosexuality, sexual orientation or preference and from enforcing such laws. Prohibits City spending to promote or approve homosexuality. Does not deny City services based on lawful sexual practices. Does not forbid public library materials for adults. Does not nullify civil rights based on race, religion, color, sex, marital status, familial status, national origin, age or disability. Does not limit constitutional rights. Allows laws which prohibit employment discrimination based on non-work related reasons.”	Passed. YES: 981 (61.74%) NO: 608 (38.26%)
June 29, 1993	Canby, Oregon	To repeal the city's gay rights ordinance	Passed.
June 29, 1993	Junction City, Oregon	To repeal the city's gay rights ordinance	Passed by one vote. The measure was later invalidated by a court but a new initiative passed in March 1994.
June 29, 1993	Douglas County, Oregon	To repeal the city's gay rights ordinance	Passed.
June 29, 1993	Josephine County, Oregon	To repeal the city's gay rights ordinance	Passed.
June 29, 1993	Klamath County, Oregon	To repeal the city's gay rights ordinance	Passed.
June 29, 1993	Linn County, Oregon	To repeal the city's gay rights ordinance	Passed.
September 21, 1993	Creswell, Oregon	To repeal the city's gay rights ordinance	Passed.
September 21, 1993	Estacada, Oregon	To repeal the city's gay rights ordinance	Passed.
September 21, 1993	Grants Pass, Oregon	To repeal the city's gay rights ordinance	Passed.
September 21, 1993	Gresham, Oregon	To repeal the city's gay rights ordinance	Passed.
September 21, 1993	Lebanon, Oregon	To repeal the city's gay rights ordinance	Passed.
September 21, 1993	Medford, Oregon	To repeal the city's gay rights ordinance	Passed.
September 21, 1993	Molalla, Oregon	To repeal the city's gay rights ordinance	Passed.
September 21, 1993	Sweet Home, Oregon	To repeal the city's gay rights ordinance	Passed.
September 21, 1993	Jackson County, Oregon	To repeal the city's gay rights ordinance	Passed.
November 9, 1993	Keizer, Oregon	To repeal the city's gay rights ordinance	Passed with 55% of the vote.
November 9, 1993	Oregon City, Oregon	To repeal the city's gay rights ordinance	Passed with 53% of the vote.
1994	Springfield, Missouri	To repeal the city's gay rights ordinance	Passed.
March 22, 1994	Albany, Oregon	To repeal the city's gay rights ordinance	Passed.
March 22, 1994	Junction City, Oregon	To repeal the city's gay rights ordinance	Passed.
March 22, 1994	Turner, Oregon	To repeal the city's gay rights ordinance	Passed.
March 22, 1994	Marion County, Oregon	To repeal the city's gay rights ordinance	Passed.
May 17, 1994	Cottage Grove, Oregon	To repeal the city's gay rights ordinance	Passed.
May 17, 1994	Gresham, Oregon	To repeal the city's gay rights ordinance	Received a majority of the vote but not the 60% majority required for passage.
May 17, 1994	Oakridge, Oregon	To repeal the city's gay rights ordinance	Passed.
May 17, 1994	Roseburg, Oregon	To repeal the city's gay rights ordinance	Passed.
May 17, 1994	Veneta, Oregon	To repeal the city's gay rights ordinance	Passed.
November 1994	Alachua County, Florida	1) To overturn the existing gay rights law 2) To bar future ordinances	Passed with 57% of the vote. Passed with 59% of the vote.
November 8, 1994	Lake County, Oregon	To repeal the city's gay rights ordinance	Passed.
January 10, 1995	West Palm Beach, Florida	To repeal the city's gay rights ordinance	Defeated with 56% of the vote.
March 7, 1995	Tampa, Florida	To repeal the city's gay rights ordinance	Five days before the election a judge threw out the referendum so the votes were not tallied.
1996	Lansing, Michigan	Two initiatives, both to repeal the city's gay rights ordinance	Passed with 52% of the vote. Passed with 55% of the vote.
1998	Fayetteville, Arkansas	To repeal the city's gay rights law	Passed with 60% of the vote.
1998	Fort Collins, Colorado	To repeal the city's gay rights law	Passed with 62% of the vote.
1999	Falmouth, Maine	To repeal the city's gay rights law	Defeated with 59% of the vote.
1999	Spokane, Washington	To repeal the city's gay rights law	Defeated with 52% of the vote.
2000	Ferndale, Michigan	To repeal the city's gay rights law	Passed.
2001	Huntington Woods, Michigan	To repeal the city's gay rights law	Defeated.
2001	Kalamazoo, Michigan	To repeal the city's gay rights law	Defeated with 54% of the vote.
2001	Traverse City, Michigan	To repeal the city's gay rights law	Defeated with 58% of the vote.
September 10, 2002	Miami-Dade County, Florida	To repeal the county's gay rights ordinance	Defeated with 53% of the vote.
2002	Westbrook, Maine	To repeal the city's gay rights law	Defeated.
2002	Ypsilanti, Michigan	To repeal the city's gay rights law	Defeated with 63% of the vote.
2002	Tacoma, Washington	To repeal the city's gay rights law	Defeated.
March 1, 2005	Topeka, Kansas	To bar Topeka from recognizing sexual orientation as a protected class for ten years	Defeated with 52% of the vote.
March 24, 2009	Gainesville, Florida	Charter Amendment One, to repeal the city's gay rights ordinance	Defeated with 58% of the vote.
November 8, 2011	Traverse City, Michigan	To repeal the anti-discrimination ordinance enacted in 2010.	Defeated by 62.9% of the vote.
November 6, 2012	Salina, Kansas	To repeal the city's anti-discrimination ordinance in public employment or housing.	Passed by 54% of voters.
November 6, 2012	Hutchinson, Kansas	To repeal the city's anti-discrimination ordinance in public employment or housing.	Passed by 58% of voters.
May 20, 2014	Pocatello, Idaho	To repeal the cities anti-discrimination ordinance for sexual orientation and gender expression	Defeated by a margin of 80 votes.
August 7, 2014	Chattanooga, Tennessee	To repeal Ordinance 12781, an ordinance prohibiting discrimination on the basis of sexual orientation and gender identity and establishing domestic partnership benefits for city employees.	Passed by a vote of 62.58% in favor of repeal and 37.42% against.
December 9, 2014	Fayetteville, Arkansas	To repeal Ordinance 5703 Chapter 119, an ordinance to protect and safeguard the right and opportunity of all persons to be free from discrimination based on real or perceived race, ethnicity, national origin, age, gender, gender identity, gender expression, familial status, marital status, socioeconomic background, religion, sexual orientation, disability and veteran status.	Passed by a vote of 51.66% in favor of repeal and 48.34% against.
April 7, 2015	Springfield, Missouri	To repeal the Ordinance 6141	Passed with 51.43% of the vote.
September 8, 2015	Fayetteville, Arkansas	To repeal the Ordinance 5781	Defeated with 52.77% of the vote.
November 3, 2015	Houston, Texas	Proposition 1	Defeated with 60.97% of the vote.
April 3, 2018	Anchorage, Alaska	Proposition 1	Defeated by 52.64% of the vote.
March 3, 2019	Tampa, Florida	Amendment 16. Amends the charter of the City of Tampa, Florida to prohibit discrimination (in addition to those already in the charter) based upon sexual orientation, pregnancy, age, marital status, familial status, disability, gender identification, genetic information, ethnicity, and any others prohibited by law, and to provide training for all city employees to address these items	Passed with 75.78% of the vote.
May 20, 2025	Pittsburgh, Pennsylvania	Question 1. This amendment would add a section to the Pittsburgh Home Rule Charter which would prohibit "the discrimination on the basis of race, religion, ancestry, sex, sexual orientation, age, gender identity or expression, disability, place of birth, national origin or association or affiliation with any nation or foreign state in conducting business of the City."	Passed with 68.25% of the vote.

== Domestic partnership repeal initiatives ==
Election date	Locale	Outcome
November 6, 1990	Seattle, Washington	Failed.
1991	San Francisco	Failed.
August 7, 2014	Chattanooga, Tennessee	Passed by a vote of 62.58% in favor of repeal and 37.42% against.

== See also ==
- LGBT rights in the United States
