= Oregon Defense of Marriage Coalition =

Political organization based in Oregon

Organization logo

The Defense of Marriage Coalition (sometimes styled Oregon Defense of Marriage Coalition to distinguish itself from similar organizations in other states) is a Christian citizens' political organization formed to support the traditional definition of marriage as the union of one man and one woman. It was organized in 2004 by the Oregon Family Council as a campaign first to place Oregon Ballot Measure 36 (2004) before the voters by initiative petition, and then once signatures were collected, as a campaign for its passage.

== History ==
The Defense of Marriage Coalition was founded in 2004. It was put together by 1,500 churches in Oregon to push for an amendment to the Constitution of Oregon to officially define marriage as a union only between one man and one woman. They collected a record 244,000 signatures to place the amendment on the ballot. This became Oregon Ballot Measure 36. The Oregon Defense of Marriage Coalition held rallies and campaigned in favor of the measure. The measure was approved by the Oregoneon voters in the subsequent referendum.

Prior to the referendum, some Oregon counties started to issue marriage licenses to same-sex couples in 2004. The Defense of Marriage Coalition initiated lawsuits against the counties as a result seeking injunctions to stop them being issued. The Oregon circuit courts issued an injunction to order the counties to stop issuing marriage licences to same-sex couples. In 2005, the Supreme Court of Oregon ruled in favor of the Defense of Marriage Coalition and ruled that the counties had acted illegally against the constitution. Accordingly, they ruled the marriage licences issued to same-sex couples were null and void.

== See also ==
- Basic Rights Oregon
