= 1994 Oregon Ballot Measure 19 =

Measure 19
- No Free Speech Protection for Obscenity, Child Pornography.

Results
Choice	Votes	%
Yes	549,754	45.74%
No	652,139	54.26%
Total votes	1,201,893	100.00%
County results
Yes
50–60%
No
50–60%
60–70%

Ballot Measure 19 was a citizen's initiative in the U.S. state of Oregon in 1994. The measure sought to amend the Oregon Constitution, limiting free speech protection for obscenity and child pornography. The measure was rejected by the voters 54.3 percent to 45.7 percent.

The measure was sponsored by the Oregon Citizens Alliance, the sponsor of Oregon Ballot Measure 9 (also a constitutional amendment), which among other things sought to prevent all governments in Oregon from using their resources to promote, encourage or facilitate homosexuality.

The text of the measure read as follows:

Article 1, Section 8 of this Constitution shall not be interpreted to prevent the people, the Legislative Assembly, or any City or County from enacting laws regulating or prohibiting obscenity, to the extent permitted by the United States Constitution. For purposes of this section, the term "obscenity" shall have the meaning given it by the United States Supreme Court, and in addition shall also include child pornography.

Opposing the measure were a coalition of groups that made up the "No Censorship - No On 19" Committee, led by the American Civil Liberties Union. Other groups included bookstores, video stores and student groups.

The OCA also sponsored Measure 13 in the same year.

== See also ==
- I know it when I see it
- Jacobellis v. Ohio, a 1964 U.S. Supreme Court decision
- List of Oregon ballot measures
- Miller v. California, a 1973 U.S. Supreme Court decision
- State v. Henry, the 1987 Oregon state Supreme Court decision that ruled there is no legal definition of obscenity in the state
