= Oregon Citizens Alliance =

American conservative Christian political organization

The Oregon Citizens Alliance (OCA) was a conservative Christian political activist organization, founded by Lon Mabon in the U.S. state of Oregon. It was founded in 1986 as a vehicle to challenge then-U.S. Senator Bob Packwood in the Republican primaries, and was involved in Oregon politics from the late 1980s into the 1990s.

== Legislative activism ==
In 1988 the group sponsored Measure 8, an initiative that repealed Governor Neil Goldschmidt's executive order banning discrimination based on sexual orientation in the executive branch of state government. The measure not only repealed the executive order, but also put a statute on the books that prohibited any job protection for gay people in state government. The measure was approved by the voters, 52.7 percent to 47.3 percent. It was the OCA's only statewide victory.

Afterwards, the OCA turned its attention to abortion. It placed Measure 10 on the 1990 general election ballot, which would have required parental notification for a minor's abortion. The measure was defeated, 52.2 percent to 47.8 percent.

In 1992 the OCA returned to the issue of homosexuality, when it proposed Measure 9. This initiative would have amended the Oregon Constitution to prevent what the OCA called "special rights" for homosexuals and bisexuals, by adding a provision that the state "recognizes homosexuality, pedophilia, sadism and masochism as abnormal, wrong, unnatural, and perverse." The ballot measure was defeated, 56 percent to 44 percent. That same year, the Oregon Court of Appeals declared Measure 8 unconstitutional. As a result, the OCA's only statewide victory was nullified.

The OCA promoted similar measures at the local level, both before and after the 1992 election, but those measures were ultimately invalidated by the Oregon Legislative Assembly. It also promoted similar statewide measures with language softer than that of Measure 9. These included Measures 13 and 19 in 1994, and Measure 9 (sometimes referred to as "Son of 9") in 2000.

The organized opposition to 1992's Measure 9 formed the basis of much of the current LGBT rights movement in Oregon, including the organization Basic Rights Oregon.

== Local efforts ==
After failing to pass Measure 9 in 1992, the OCA turned its attention to passing anti-discrimination bans at the county and municipal level. Couching the debate in terms of forbidding LGBTQ people from receiving so-called "special rights," the OCA sought not only to block ordinances in these communities but to bar them from spending money to "promote homosexuality." The OCA was successful in passing over two dozen initiatives. However, in 1993 the Oregon Legislative Assembly passed a law prohibiting local governments from considering LGBTQ rights measures so the ordinances had no legal force. The Oregon Court of Appeals upheld the state law in 1995, and the Oregon Supreme Court denied review. Two weeks after the United States Supreme Court ruled in Romer v. Evans, the OCA suspended its efforts for a third statewide ballot initiative.

Election date	Locale	Measure	Outcome			Notes
May 19, 1992	Corvallis	02-06	✗	4,896 (36.21%)	8,625 (63.79%)	
May 19, 1992	Springfield	20-08	✓	5,929 (55.38%)	4,777 (44.62%)	Final official results.
May 18, 1993	Cornelius	34-5	✓	956 (61.64%)	595 (38.36%)	
June 29, 1993	Canby		✓	1,961 (55.76%)	1,556 (44.24%)	Final unofficial results
June 29, 1993	Junction City	20-01	✓	631 (50.04%)	630 (49.96%)	The initial certified count was 631 Yes-628 No, but a recount was conducted, narrowing the margin to one vote. The measure was later invalidated by a court, but a new initiative passed March 22, 1994.
June 29, 1993	Douglas Co.		✓			
June 29, 1993	Josephine Co.		✓	13,048 (60.47%)	8,529 (39.53)	Final unofficial results
June 29, 1993	Klamath Co.	18-01	✓	11,304 (65.87%)	5,856 (34.13%)	
June 29, 1993	Linn Co.		✓	18,197 (69.06%)	8,153 (30.94%)	Final unofficial results
September 21, 1993	Creswell	20-01	✓	368 (57.86%)	268 (42.14%)	Final official results
September 21, 1993	Estacada	3-1	✓	349 (54.45%)	292 (45.55%)	Final unofficial results
September 21, 1993	Lebanon	22-02	✓	1,869 (65.24%)	996 (34.76%)	Final unofficial results
September 21, 1993	Medford	15-2	✓	8,550 (58.48%)	6,070 (41.52%)	Incomplete results
September 21, 1993	Molalla	3-2	✓	443 (54.96%)	363 (45.04%)	Final unofficial results
September 21, 1993	Sweet Home	22-01	✓	1,242 (77.33%)	364 (22.67%)	Final unofficial results
September 21, 1993	Jackson Co.	15-1	✓	27,621 (59.10%)	19,115 (40.90%)	Incomplete results
November 9, 1993	Keizer		✓	55%	45%	
November 9, 1993	Oregon City		✓	53%	47%	
March 22, 1994	Albany	22-3	✓	5,357 (58.82%)	3,750 (41.18%)	Final unofficial results
March 22, 1994	Junction City	20-6	✓	658 (56.97%)	497 (43.03%)	Final official results Replaced a measure passed June 29, 1993 but invalidated in court.
March 22, 1994	Marion Co.	24-5	✓	36,663 (60.77%)	23,666 (39.23%)	Final unofficial results
March 22, 1994	Turner	22-03	✓	349 (78.96%)	93 (21.04%)	Final unofficial results
May 17, 1994	Cottage Grove	20-15	✓	1158 (57.13%)	869 (42.87%)	Final official results
May 17, 1994	Grants Pass		✓			
May 17, 1994	Gresham	26-4	✗	8,035 (50.45%)	7,891 (49.55%)	Charter amendments require 60%.
May 17, 1994	Oakridge	20-10	✓	397 (51.42%)	375 (48.58%)	Final official results
May 17, 1994	Roseburg		✓	65%	35%	Final unofficial results
May 17, 1994	Veneta	20-12	✓	321 (55.44%)	258 (44.56%)	Final official results
November 8, 1994	Lake Co.	19-3	✓	1864 (60.03%)	1241 (39.97%)	Final Official Results

== Hands Off Washington ==
In 1993, the OCA intervened in Washington state politics by introducing two ballot measures that would have threatened the employability of persons who were, or were perceived to be, LGBTQ. An ad hoc grassroots movement called Hands Off Washington was organized in opposition to the measures. The Hands Off Washington campaign repelled both efforts.

== 1996 Senate race ==
In the 1996 U.S. Senate special election to succeed Senator Bob Packwood, the OCA endorsed Gordon Smith over Ron Wyden in the race. Critics faulted Smith for failing to take a strong stand against the OCA, and he was defeated by Wyden. When Smith made a second run for the Senate a few months later after incumbent Mark Hatfield had retired, Mabon ran against Smith. The Oregonian cited Mabon's candidacy as a key component of Smith's attempt in the second race to establish himself as a centrist, contributing to his victory over Democrat Tom Bruggere.

== See also ==
- Abortion in Oregon
- Christianity in the United States
- LGBTQ rights in Oregon
- List of Oregon ballot measures
- List of US ballot initiatives to repeal LGBT anti-discrimination laws
- Scott Lively
