= Domestic partnership in Oregon =

Oregon has registered domestic partnerships between same-sex couples since 2008 and has expanded the law to begin registering partnerships between opposite-sex couples in 2024.

In April and May 2007, following a previous attempt in 2005, the Oregon state legislature passed legislation to make virtually all of the rights afforded by the state to married couples available to same-sex couples. The status is referred to in Oregon law as a domestic partnership, avoiding the use of the terms marriage or civil union. Governor Ted Kulongoski signed the bill on May 9, 2007. While January 1, 2008 was the date the statute would have taken effect, a court challenge had delayed its implementation. It was resolved on February 1, 2008, and the law went into effect that day, with registrations beginning on February 4, 2008.

== History ==
=== Advocacy for civil unions ===
The original Oregon Senate Bill 1000 would have created civil unions and prohibited discrimination based on sexual orientation in housing, employment, public accommodations and public services. On July 8, 2005, Oregon state senators approved it. Lawmakers at the Oregon State Capitol in Salem voted 19–10 in favor, but the Republican Speaker of the Oregon House of Representatives, Karen Minnis, blocked it.

=== Advocacy for reciprocal beneficiaries ===
On July 21, 2005, the House performed a series of moves where the bill was amended, removing most of its language and replacing it with different text (seen by some to be a "gut and stuff" maneuver). The new text of Senate Bill 1000 no longer contained language about sexual orientation, prohibition of discrimination, nor civil unions. Instead, it reaffirmed the recent state constitutional prohibition of same-sex marriage and proposed to create "reciprocal beneficiary agreements". "Reciprocal beneficiaries" could be any two people prohibited by law from marrying each other, such as a "widowed mother and her unmarried son", and would not have the rights and obligations of married persons, specifically excluding employer-granted benefits such as health insurance or retirement benefits. Reciprocal beneficiaries would be granted inheritance rights, and the power to make medical or financial decisions if the reciprocal beneficiary was incapacitated.

The changes effectively killed momentum to pass the bill, which died in committee.

=== Domestic partnerships ===
However, after the November 2006 mid-term elections Democrats won a majority of the formerly Republican-controlled House, and in early 2007, Democrats re-introduced a bill in the House similar to the 2005 legislation. The bill adopted the term "domestic partnership" to describe these unions; the terms "marriage" or "civil union" were absent. This bill enjoyed a relatively easy passage through the legislature, when compared to its 2005 predecessor. Passed by the House on April 17, 2007 (by a vote of 34–26) and by the Senate on May 2, 2007 (by a vote of 21–9), Governor Kulongoski signed the Oregon Family Fairness Act on May 9, 2007. The law was scheduled to take effect January 1, 2008, but was delayed by a preliminary injunction until after a hearing on February 1, 2008, where the injunction was lifted. Domestic partnerships became effective from February 4, 2008.

== Differences in the legislation ==
Oregon uses the term "domestic partnerships", as do Washington state and California. While the registries in Washington state and California made domestic partnerships available to couples of any gender, Oregon initially limited them to same-sex couples. Opposite-sex couples in Oregon may apply for domestic partnerships beginning January 1, 2024.

Oregon's legislation has no ceremony requirement. All marriage (and civil unions, in states that offer it) requires a ceremony, whether religious or civil, to be considered valid. In Oregon couples are required only to register their domestic partnerships through the submission of a paper form.

An Oregon domestic partnership is recognized by the state of Oregon, but it is up to other states and the federal government whether they'll recognize it too.

== House Bill 2839 ==
On June 25, 2009, the governor signed House Bill 2839. It updated the domestic partnership law in several areas: taxes, health insurance benefits and entitlements, taking a domestic partner's surname, and clarifying other states' uses of the terms "domestic partnership" and "civil union" so that Oregon could recognize these as "domestic partnerships".

== Delays ==
In 2007, an attempted referendum to repeal these laws before they take effect failed to gather enough signatures. Such an effort, accomplished by a petition putting the laws to voter approval via a ballot question, would have delayed enforcement of the law to January 1, 2009. In September 2007, groups challenging the amendment submitted approximately 63,000 signatures in favor of repealing the legislation; the minimum number of signatures required for a referendum is 55,179. The Secretary of State's office later determined that only 55,063 valid signatures were collected, thereby removing a barrier to a January 1, 2008 effective date. On December 28, federal judge Michael W. Mosman issued an injunction preventing implementation of the law, after hearing a legal challenge (by a group opposing the measure) criticizing the method used by the Secretary of State's office to determine what constitutes a valid signature. A hearing on this issue was then scheduled for February 1, 2008, when the injunction was lifted, allowing the law to go in force immediately, with registrations beginning on February 4, 2008.

== Opposite-sex domestic partnerships ==
In April 2023, both houses of the Oregon Legislative Assembly voted to allow opposite-sex couples to formally enter into domestic partnerships. The bill was signed into law by the Governor of Oregon and goes into effect on January 1, 2024.

== See also ==
- LGBT rights in Oregon
- Same-sex marriage in Oregon
- Same-sex marriage in the United States
- Same-sex marriage legislation in the United States
- Same-sex marriage in the United States public opinion
- Same-sex marriage status in the United States by state
- List of benefits of marriage in the United States
- Defense of Marriage Act
- Marriage Protection Act
- U.S. state constitutional amendments banning same-sex unions
- Federal Marriage Amendment
- Domestic partnerships in the United States
- Freedom to Marry Coalition
- History of civil marriage in the U.S.
