= Idaho Proposition 1 =

Idaho Proposition 1 may refer to:

- 1994 Idaho Proposition 1, regarding gay rights
- 2018 Idaho Proposition 1, regarding horse racing
- 2024 Idaho Proposition 1, regarding top-four primary and ranked choice voting
- 2026 Idaho Proposition 1, regarding abortion
