= Thomas More Law Center =

Christian conservative law firm in Michigan, US

- Headquarters: Ann Arbor Charter Township, Michigan
- Region served: United States
- President and Chief Counsel: Richard Thompson
- Budget: US$1,378,329 (2012)
- Website: www.thomasmore.org

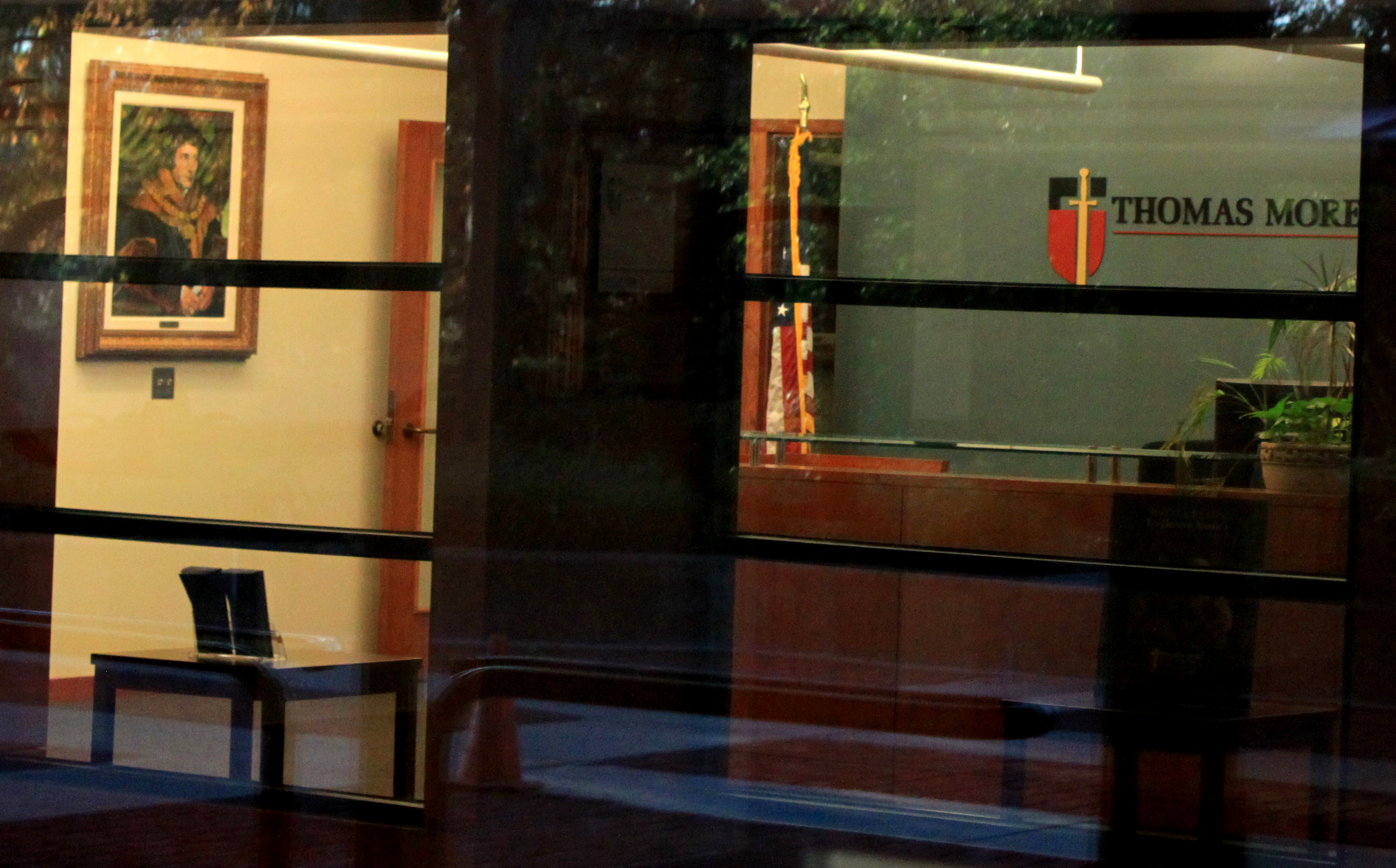
Thomas More Law Center offices lobby, Domino's Farms

The Thomas More Law Center is a Christian, conservative, nonprofit, public interest law firm based in Ann Arbor Charter Township, Michigan, and active throughout the United States. According to the Thomas More Law Center website, its goals are to "preserve America's Judeo-Christian heritage, defend the religious freedom of Christians, restore time-honored moral and family values, protect the sanctity of human life, and promote a strong national defense and a free and sovereign United States of America".

The Thomas More Law Center is active in social issues such as opposing same-sex marriage, abortion, provisions of the Patient Protection and Affordable Care Act and the HHS Mandate. The Law Center has been involved, often unsuccessfully, in high-profile cases including the litigation of the Dover, Pennsylvania intelligent design case, the defense of Lt. Col. Jeffrey Chessani against misconduct allegations stemming from the November 2005 Haditha incident, and the Law Center's federal lawsuit against the US Government regarding the constitutionality of the Patient Protection and Affordable Care Act and the Individual Mandate. The Law Center also litigates cases related to the defense of Christians and anti-abortion activists.

== Founding and history ==
The center was founded in 1999 by Domino's Pizza founder Tom Monaghan and the center's current President and Chief Counsel Richard Thompson, a former Oakland County, Michigan prosecutor known for his role in the prosecution of Jack Kevorkian. Among those who have sat on the center's advisory board are former Senators Rick Santorum and retired Rear Admiral Jeremiah Denton, former Major League Baseball commissioner Bowie Kuhn, Catholic academic Charles Rice, Mary Cunningham Agee, and Ambassador Alan Keyes. The center's Citizens' Advisory Board also includes Representative Michele Bachmann and Lieutenant Colonel Allen West. The center is primarily financed by contributions from individuals, foundations, and corporations and is recognized by the IRS as a 501(c)(3) organization.

=== Name ===
The center is named after Thomas More, an English lawyer, social philosopher, author, statesman and Renaissance humanist. He was an important councilor to Henry VIII and was Lord Chancellor. More opposed the Protestant Reformation, in particular, the theology of Martin Luther and William Tyndale, whose books he burned. More later opposed the King's separation from the Catholic Church and refused to accept him as Supreme Head of the Church of England because it disparaged papal authority. He was tried for treason, convicted, and beheaded. Thomas More is the patron saint of lawyers in the Catholic Church.

== Notable cases ==
=== Intelligent design ===
In 2005, the Thomas More Law Center represented the defendants in one of the country's first intelligent design cases, Kitzmiller v. Dover Area School District.

Prior to taking on this particular case, the lawyers of the Thomas More Law Center traveled the country seeking a school board willing to withstand a lawsuit as a test case for the teaching of intelligent design in public schools, forcing the first test case for intelligent design in the courts.

In the summer of 2004, the Dover, Pennsylvania, school board, after receiving legal advice from the Discovery Institute, accepted the center's offer of advice and possible representation as they worked to change their science curriculum. On November 19, 2004, the Dover Area School District announced that commencing in January 2005, teachers would be required to read a statement to students in the ninth-grade biology class at Dover High School: "The Pennsylvania Academic Standards require students to learn about Darwin's Theory of Evolution and eventually to take a standardized test of which evolution is a part. Because Darwin's Theory is a theory, it continues to be tested as new evidence is discovered. The Theory is not a fact. Gaps in the Theory exist for which there is no evidence. A theory is defined as a well-tested explanation that unifies a broad range of observations. Intelligent Design is an explanation of the origin of life that differs from Darwin's view. The reference book, Of Pandas and People, is available for students who might be interested in gaining an understanding of what Intelligent Design actually involves. With respect to any theory, students are encouraged to keep an open mind. The school leaves the discussion of the Origins of Life to individual students and their families. As a Standards-driven district, class instruction focuses upon preparing students to achieve proficiency on Standards-based assessments."

A large number of copies of Of Pandas and People had been donated to the school by a member of the school board who purchased them using money he had given to his father, Donald Bonsell, and said they were donations solicited from his church. A month later, on December 14, 2004, the ACLU and Americans United for Separation of Church and State filed suit on behalf of eleven Dover parents, claiming that the statement was a violation of the Establishment Clause of the First Amendment.

The Center defended the school district in the trial, which lasted from September 26 through November 4.

The case was decided on December 20, 2005. Judge John E. Jones III delivered a 139-page decision in favor of the plaintiffs, ruling that Intelligent Design is not science but essentially religious in nature and consequently inappropriate for a biology class. Members of the board that had originally enacted the policy were not re-elected, preventing an appeal.

The judge was scathing about the conduct of the defendants, saying, "It is ironic that several of these individuals, who so staunchly and proudly touted their religious convictions in public, would time and again lie to cover their tracks and disguise the real purpose behind the ID Policy" and "The students, parents, and teachers of the Dover Area School District deserved better than to be dragged into this legal maelstrom, with its resulting utter waste of monetary and personal resources."

=== Christian religious freedom issues ===
- Travis Leach In 2001, the Law Center faxed a letter in defense of Traverse City, Michigan, police veteran Travis Leach, after he raised a religious objection to the city's newly adopted diversity measure which put rainbow flag bumper stickers on city vehicles, including police cruisers. Leach, a devout Christian, objected to the stickers as promoting "the homosexual lifestyle", which he considered a sin. The city's Human Rights Commission requested that Leach's fitness as a police officer be investigated. On the same day the letter was faxed, Police Chief Ralph Soffredine announced Leach had been cleared.
- Hansen et al., v Ann Arbor Public Schools et al. In July 2002, the Thomas More Law Center sued the Ann Arbor Public School system for violating a student's constitutional right to freedom of speech and right to equal protection, as well as the Establishment Clause. The Center won the case, with the judge ruling that the district had violated the student's rights by not allowing her to participate in a "Diversity Week" panel discussion concerning homosexuality and religion because she wished to discuss her Catholic faith.
- Skoros v. City of New York The Thomas More Law Center sued New York's school district in December 2002, saying a school policy was discriminatory against Roman Catholics by not allowing Nativity displays at Christmas but allowing the display of the Jewish menorah and the Islamic Star and Crescent during certain religious holidays and observances. Judge Charles P. Sifton of the United States District Court for the Eastern District of New York rejected the Center's constitutional claims. The 2nd Circuit Court of Appeals upheld the lower court's decision in February 2006.
- Johnson v. Poway Unified School District The Center filed a federal lawsuit against a Southern California school district on behalf of a teacher who was ordered to remove several banners from his classroom because school officials claimed the banners promoted an impermissible Judeo-Christian viewpoint. The banners contained slogans such as "In God We Trust" and "One Nation Under God". On September 13, 2011, the 9th Circuit U.S. Court of Appeals overturned the summary judgment and ruled that the school district did not violate Johnson's free speech rights. The unanimous decision of the federal appeals court relied on U.S. Supreme Court rulings that said governments can limit the free speech rights of public employees in the workplace.
- On behalf of Catholic priest Ray Leonard, the Center sued the federal government for not allowing him to conduct services on a military base during a government shutdown.

=== Abortion & euthanasia issues ===
- Bernardo v. Planned Parenthood Federation of America In August 2001, the Thomas More Law Center filed a lawsuit against Planned Parenthood Federation of America and its affiliate Planned Parenthood of San Diego and Riverside Counties on behalf of three California women. The lawsuit accused Planned Parenthood of misleading women about the safety of abortion. The Center demanded that Planned Parenthood inform women of a link between abortion and breast cancer. Although Planned Parenthood and medical experts denied any such link, a Center lawyer claimed that a "preponderance of medical evidence" did establish a link. The judge dismissed the case and said there was little likelihood the lawsuit would succeed. This particular case was dismissed on appeal on a procedural issue under California's anti-SLAPP statute as the information concerning the link between abortion and breast cancer provided by Planned Parenthood on its website "did not concern any product or service within the meaning of the UCL, nor did it concern or advertise any product or service within the meaning of the FAL, and thus did not fall within the ambit of these consumer protection statutes".
- Martin v. Larsen In 2001, the Law Center filed a lawsuit against Great Falls, Montana, Assistant City Attorney Kory Larsen, and two other city officials, claiming they violated the rights of abortion protesters with an already-removed one-week ban on graphic signs depicting aborted fetuses. Larsen said the signs were creating a public nuisance and were a risk to public safety.
- Schiavo et al. v Schiavo The Thomas More Law Center also got involved in the Terri Schiavo case in Florida in October 2003, sending Governor Jeb Bush a legal analysis stating that he could order a criminal investigation into whether or not Michael Schiavo had abused his wife. The Florida legislature passed "Terri's Law", giving Bush the authority to intervene in Schiavo's case and have her life-sustaining measures reconnected. The law was later deemed unconstitutional by Judge W. Douglas Baird, a Circuit Judge in the Florida Sixth Circuit.
- Fitzgerald v. City of Portland In February 2014, the Law Center sued the City of Portland, Maine, on behalf of several anti-abortion activists concerning Portland City Ordinance § 17-108-111, which creates a Prohibited Zone where "[n]o person shall knowingly enter or remain on a public way or sidewalk adjacent to a reproductive health care facility with a radius of 39 feet of any portion of an entrance, exit, or driveway of a reproductive health care facility." The United States Supreme Court in June 2014 declared a similar 35-foot prohibited zone in Massachusetts to be unconstitutional. In July, the Portland City Council voluntarily repealed the ordinance. Most of the lawsuit was then dismissed as moot. Still, as of October 2014, a portion of the lawsuit seeking nominal damages of one dollar in recognition of past constitutional harm remained.

=== Sexual orientation and gender identity ===
- In RE: The Estate of Marshall M. Gardiner In 2002, the Law Center filed an amicus brief opposing the notion that a sex change operation changes a person's sex for the purpose of marriage. At issue was whether Marshall Gardiner's wife, J'Noel Ball, was eligible to receive one-half of his sizable estate after he died without a will. J'Noel was designated male at birth, had sex reassignment therapy, and had her Wisconsin birth certificate changed to reflect that she was a woman and not a man. The Kansas Supreme Court determined that "J'Noel remains a transsexual and a male for purposes of marriage under K.S.A.2001 Supp. 23-101."
- Rohde v Ann Arbor Public Schools MEA NEA In September 2003, the Thomas More Law Center filed a lawsuit against the Ann Arbor Public School District on behalf of 17 individual taxpayers who had sent the school district letters requesting they stop using the public funds for employee domestic partnership benefits. The Center argued that the use of taxpayer funds to provide insurance benefits to same-sex domestic partners circumvented the 1996 Michigan Defense of Marriage Act, which defines marriage as "inherently a unique relationship between a man and a woman". On July 25, 2007, the Michigan Supreme Court ruled that the individuals did not have the constitutional standing to sue the Ann Arbor Public School District. The case was eventually dismissed due to lack of standing.
- American Family Association v Michigan State University The Thomas More Law Center filed a similar lawsuit against Michigan State University in July 2006 after Michigan passed the Marriage Protection Amendment to the Michigan Constitution in 2004. The constitutional amendment defined "the union between a man and a woman" as "the only agreement recognized as a marriage or similar union for any purpose". The Michigan Supreme Court ruled that the amendment banning same-sex marriages also blocks Michigan governments and state universities from offering "domestic partnership" benefits for homosexual couples. The ruling, however, had little effect since most public employers relaxed their eligibility criteria to avoid violating the amendment's restrictions.
- Charter Amendment One (Gainesville, Florida) The City Council of Gainesville, Florida, voted to enact protection for sexual preference and gender identity in January 2008. The Thomas More Law Center wrote an amendment to repeal the protection that went to popular vote on March 24, 2009, losing with 42% of the vote in favor of repeal and 58% against repeal.
- Michigan Marriage Amendment The Law Center participated in the drafting of Michigan's Marriage Amendment, which voters enacted in November 2004. The amendment made it unconstitutional for the state to recognize or perform same-sex marriages or civil unions.
- National Black Pastors and Christian Leaders Coalition In May 2014, the Law Center announced a partnership with the National Coalition of Black Pastors and Christian Leaders to oppose the legalization of same-sex marriage through the filing of amicus briefs filed on behalf of the pastors in what the Law Center deemed "key cases" around the country. The Law Center filed amicus briefs before the U.S. Court of Appeals for the Fifth Circuit, Sixth Circuit, the Supreme Court.

=== Islam issues ===
- Eklund v. Byron Union School District In July 2002, the Thomas More Law Center filed a lawsuit against Contra Costa County's Byron Union School District on behalf of the parents of four students. The suit argued that the curriculum required that "students pretend to be Muslims, wear robes, simulate jihads via a dice game, learn the Five Pillars of Faith and memorize verses from the Koran in classroom exercises as part of a World History and Geography class" and thus violated the Establishment Clause of the First Amendment. The 9th Circuit Court of Appeals found that the curriculum did not amount to an unconstitutional school sponsorship of a specific religion. The U.S. Supreme Court declined review of the case.
- Kevin Murray v. U.S. Treasury Sec. Timothy Geithner, et al. The Law Center filed a federal lawsuit against the Department of Treasury and the Board of Governors of the Federal Reserve, challenging a portion of the Emergency Economic Stabilization Act of 2008 that appropriated $40 billion in taxpayer money to fund the federal government's majority ownership interest in American International Group (AIG). The lawsuit claimed that the federal government, through its ownership of AIG, engages in Sharia-based Islamic religious activities. The Center claimed the use of taxpayer dollars to fund Shariah-based Islamic religious activities violated the Establishment Clause of the First Amendment. While federal Judge Lawrence P. Zatkoff was requested by the Department of Justice to dismiss the lawsuit in 2009, he reached a summary judgment in January, 2011, noting that the religious involvement did not achieve the "excessive entanglement" required under a precedential ruling.
- Olmsted Falls, Ohio In October 2013, the Law Center threatened the Olmsted Falls City School District to remove what the center described as an "Islamic proselytizing video" from the 7th-grade world history curriculum. The School District felt it could not spare the funds to defend itself in court. The film in question comes from the FX television network's 30 Days series. The specific episode, "Muslims and America", followed a Christian man who is transported to Dearborn, Michigan where he lives with a Muslim family, attends prayer services and religious instruction in a mosque and otherwise lives as a Muslim.

=== Military and national security issues ===
- LtCol Jeffrey Chessani Jeffrey R. Chessani was a United States Marine Corps Lieutenant Colonel and the commanding officer of 3rd Battalion, 1st Marines during the time of the November 19, 2005, urban combat in Haditha, Iraq, where Marines in his battalion were accused of having killed 15 civilians while pursuing insurgents. The Thomas More Law Center defended Chessani against the charge that he failed to investigate the killings. The center also defended him before an administrative Board of Inquiry, wherein the Board found that there was no misconduct. Chessani retired from the US Marine Corps on July 16, 2010.

On June 17, 2008, Military Judge Colonel Steven Folsom dismissed all charges against Chessani because General James Mattis, who approved the filing of charges against Chessani, was improperly influenced by an investigator probing the incident. The ruling was without prejudice, which allows the prosecution to refile.

- Downey v. United States Department of the Army In November 2014, the Law Center filed a federal lawsuit against the United States Department of the Army and the Secretary of the Army John M. McHugh on behalf of Lt. Col. Christopher Downey. Downey was administratively convicted in an Article 15 procedure of assaulting a soldier who was attempting to videotape two lesbian officers engaged in a public display of affection during a full-dress formal military ball at Ft. Drum, New York, as well as violating the repeal of Don't Ask, Don't Tell. The lawsuit disputes these administrative convictions, saying that the soldier was never assaulted, but may have been accidentally hit as Downey sought to lower the camera being used to film the officers. The lawsuit claims that Downey was seeking to stop the women's behavior out of concern for their reputations and the reputation of the Army. A special three-officer "show cause" board, convened after the Article 15 conviction, which reviewed the punishment, unanimously ruled that the evidence showed Downey did not violate Army rules; the board also voted to retain Lt. Col. Downey. The lawsuit accuses the Army of violating Downey's constitutional rights by preventing him from adequately defending himself and asks a federal judge to overturn the convictions.

=== Free speech ===
- Anti-abortion T-shirts During the early 2000s, the Law Center was involved in disputes involving anti-abortion T-shirts including those distributed by Rock for Life for National Pro-Life T-shirt Day. These black T-shirts and sweatshirts emblazoned with "Abortion is Homicide" were deemed inappropriate by administrators of schools in Virginia, California, Texas, Michigan, Pennsylvania, New Hampshire, New York, Ohio, and Maine. The Law Center distributed a copy of a similar legal memo to students participated in National Pro-Life T-shirt Day. The Law Center also successfully defended Samantha Gallardo's anti-abortion T-shirts in California in 2002.
- Savage v Napolitano In 2009, American radio talk show Michael Savage was banned from entry into the United Kingdom as he was "considered to be engaging in unacceptable behavior by seeking to provoke others to serious criminal acts and fostering hatred which might lead to inter-community violence" by the United Kingdom's Home Secretary. Savage and lawyers from Thomas More Law Center appealed to then Secretary of State Hillary Clinton, asking that Savage's name be removed from the list of individuals barred from entering the UK. As of 2017, Savage remains banned from the UK.
- Terry Jones Since 2011, the Law Center has represented pastor Terry Jones in lawsuits against him and against the City of Dearborn. The lawsuits stem from Jones's anti-Islamic activities, including protests and the staged burning of the Quran. In April 2011, Jones planned to protest outside the Islamic Center of America. On the day he was to attend the protest, local authorities questioned him in Court and required him to post a $45,000 "peace bond" to cover Dearborn's potential security costs. Jones contested that requirement, and the jury voted on April 22 to require the posting of a $1 "peace bond", but Jones and his co-pastor Wayne Sapp initially to refuse to pay. They were held briefly in jail, while claiming violation of First Amendment rights. That night Jones was released by the court after paying the reduced bond amount. On November 11, 2011, Wayne County Circuit Court Judge Robert Ziolkowski vacated the "breach of peace" ruling against Jones and Wayne Sapp on the grounds that they were denied due process.
- Glowacki v. Howell Public School District In 2011, the Law Center filed a lawsuit against Howell public school and one of its teachers on behalf of a student who was removed from the classroom on October 20, 2010 after expressing religious beliefs against the acceptance of homosexuality. According to the lawsuit, on the day that the district was observing the Gay & Lesbian Alliance Against Defamation (GLAAD) supported anti-homosexual-bullying Spirit Day, the student reacted to a fellow student being asked to remove a Confederate flag belt buckle by asking why it was permissible to display the gay pride flag. The suit further says that the teacher asked him "if he supported gays", and that when the student said his Catholic religion prohibited him from doing so, the student and another student who shared his views were told to leave the class or face suspension.

In reference to the case, Richard Thompson, the Law Center's president and chief counsel said, "The purpose of our lawsuit was to protect students' constitutional rights to free speech, defend religious liberty and stop public schools from becoming indoctrination centers for the homosexual agenda." In June 2013, the claims against Howell Schools were dismissed. However, the claims that the teacher involved violated the student's First Amendment right to free speech were granted, and the teacher was ordered to pay $1 for the violation.

=== Ten Commandments monuments ===
- Summum v. Duchesne City In 2003, the Law Center took up the defense of a Ten Commandments monument in Duchesne City, Utah. The Ten Commandments went up in Roy Park in Duchesne City in 1979, a donation by the family of the late Irvin Cole. After Summum filed suit, the city deeded the monolith and its 10-by-11-foot plot to the local Lions Club for $10 and 10,000 hours of already performed beautification services. After U.S. District Judge Dee Benson expressed concern about how the transfer was carried out, the city undid the transaction and sold the monument and land to three Cole daughters for $250. Benson deemed in her summary judgement that the city's "efforts to disassociate itself from further involvement with the Ten Commandments monument are sufficient..." This case is a companion case to Pleasant Grove City v. Summum. The lawsuits made their way to the 10th U.S. Circuit Court of Appeals, where a panel said the municipalities must allow Summum to put up its monuments. Both municipalities then asked the U.S. Supreme Court to overturn the 10th Circuit ruling. In the Pleasant Grove case, the Supreme Court ruled unanimously in February 2009 that the city did not violate Summum's free-speech rights when it refused permission to place a Seven Aphorisms monument in a public park. The high court never ruled on the Duchesne suit, which was sent back to U.S. District Judge Dale Kimball in Salt Lake City for a decision based on the Pleasant Grove ruling. However unlike in Pleasant Grove, whose park includes several other donated monuments or displays, Duchesne's park only had the Ten Commandments monument. Eventually, Duchesne officials decided to move the Ten Commandments monument from Roy Park to the city cemetery to avoid continued litigation.
- Society of Separationists v. Pleasant Grove City et al. In 2004, the Law Center defended a Ten Commandments monument that has stood since 1971 in a public park in Pleasant Grove City, Utah. The suit filed by the Society of Separationists against the city was initially dismissed by Judge Bruce S. Jenkins. However, in 2005, the United States Court of Appeals for the Tenth Circuit reversed the lower court's grant of judgment on the pleadings and remanded the case back to the district court for further proceedings. In 2006, after the Supreme Court's ruling in Van Orden v. Perry, which described the constitutionality of a Ten Commandments monument in at the Texas State Capitol in Austin, Texas, the Society of Separationists asked that the lawsuit be dismissed.

=== Christmas ===
- Donnell v. Palm Beach Town Council In 2003, the Law Center filed a lawsuit on behalf of two Palm Beach residents against the town for not allowing them to put a nativity scene next to the town's two menorah displays. The lawsuit alleged that for the past two years the town had permitted the public display of menorahs at various prominent public locations, and that town officials had repeatedly refused to review requests to have nativity scenes displayed alongside them. On December 16, 2003 U.S. District Judge Daniel T.K. Hurley gave town officials 48 hours to respond to the request. Hurley said the town's inaction on the request may be a constitutional violation because the women were entitled to a timely answer. The town council eventually denied the request. After a consent judgement was entered in favor of the nativity display, the city of Palm Beach was forced to pay attorney's fees and publicly apologize to the women.
- Snowden v. Town of Bay Harbor Islands In 2004, the Law Center filed a lawsuit on behalf of Sandra Snowden against the Town of Bay Harbor Islands after Snowden was denied permission to display a nativity on public property. Judge Cecilia Altonaga for the United States District Court for the Southern District of Florida ruled in favor of Snowden, requiring the city to describe in writing how it would allow the nativity display.
- Stratechuk v. Board of Education, South Orange-Maplewood School District et al. In 2004, the Law Center filed a lawsuit on behalf of Michael Stratechuk challenging New Jersey's Maplewood Public School District's ban on traditional Christmas music, including instrumentals. Richard Thompson, the Law Center's chief counsel described the ban as "another example of the anti-Christmas, anti-religion policy infecting our public school system". In a statement, school Superintendent Brian Osborne said the policy "was adopted to promote an inclusive environment for all students in our school community". U.S. District Judge William H. Walls held that the school's policy has a valid secular purpose, does not convey a message of disapproval of religion, and does not foster an excessive entanglement with religion.
- John Satawa v. Mcomb County Road Commission In 2009, the Law Center filed a lawsuit on behalf of John Satawa in the United States District Court for the Eastern District of Michigan, Southern Division claiming Satawa's constitutional rights were violated when he was ordered to remove a nativity scene from the median of a public road. The suit sought for Satawa to be allowed to put back the 8- by 8-foot nativity scene.

After receiving a complaint by the Wisconsin-based Freedom From Religion Foundation, the Road Commission of Macomb County told Satawa to remove the holiday display, citing incomplete permits. Satawa's permit application was later denied because it "clearly displays a religious message" and violated "separation of church and state", according to Macomb County highway engineer Robert Hoepfner. After a four year court battle, the United States Court of Appeals for the Sixth Circuit ruled in favor of the display and the roads commission opted not to appeal the ruling, granting Satawa a permit for the display.

=== Other ===
- Vasquez v. Los Angeles County In 2006, the center's West Coast office filed a federal lawsuit against Los Angeles County officials for their decision to remove a small cross from the county seal after they were threatened with a lawsuit by the American Civil Liberties Union and spent an estimated $700,000 to replace the seal on thousands of government buildings, vehicles and uniforms. The Law Center argued that the same Constitutional clause that prevents the establishment of a state religion also forbids the government from taking actions that convey a message of hostility toward religion. The lawsuit was rejected at the district, federal appeals, and Supreme court levels. The center also provided legal supervision for a ballot initiative to keep the cross on the seal, which did not generate enough signatures for placement on the ballot.
- Trunk v. City of San Diego The center's West Coast office intervened on behalf of the Citizens for the Mt. Soledad National War Memorial, to prevent the city of San Diego from removing a 29 ft cross from the existing Mt. Soledad war memorial. In December 2013, U.S. District Judge Larry Burns ruled that the cross must be removed. However, he issued a stay on the ruling allowing for the Law Center to appeal to the United States Supreme Court, asking for a stay in destruction of the memorial. In June 2013, the U.S. Supreme Court refused to intervene in the two-decade-old battle until the appellate court rules on the issue. The case was dismissed by the 9th U.S. Circuit Court of Appeals in 2016 after a group called the Mt. Soledad Memorial Association bought the land under the cross in 2015.
- Thomas More Law Center et al. v. Barack H. Obama et al. The Thomas More Law Center filed a federal lawsuit challenging the constitutionality of the Patient Protection and Affordable Care Act. The purpose of the lawsuit was to permanently enjoin enforcement of the new health care legislation. The lawsuit was filed on behalf of the Center itself, and four individuals from the Southeastern Michigan area, none of whom had private health care insurance. On October 7, 2010, U.S. District Court Judge George Caram Steeh dismissed two out of six of their claims, upholding these provisions under Congress's interstate commerce clause powers. The court eventually ruled that the minimum coverage portion of the Act which was in question was Constitutionally sound, a ruling that was confirmed by the U.S. Court of Appeals for the Sixth Circuit in June, 2011. In July 2011, the Center petitioned the Supreme Court to review the case; that petition was denied in July 2012.
- Brinsdon v. McAllen Independent School District In 2013, the Law Center filed a lawsuit against McAllen Independent School District, stating that a student enrolled in a high school Spanish class had been punished for refusing to recite the Mexican Pledge of Allegiance and Mexican National Anthem complete with arm outstretched in the appropriate posture. In January 2015, U.S. District Judge Micaela Alvarez of the Southern District of Texas dismissed the case, ruling that the student's attorneys provided no evidence of a school board policy that required students to recite the Mexican Pledge of Allegiance or sing the Mexican National Anthem, adding that teaching multiculturalism in public school is not inherently unconstitutional and that there was no evidence that the student's rights were violated.

== Evaluations ==
Charity evaluator Charity Navigator rated the center with three stars out of a possible four overall, based on their filings for the fiscal year ending December 2013. This overall rating reflects the combination of a three-star financial rating and a three-star accountability and transparency rating. For the fiscal year ending December 2011, the organization had a one-star overall, reflecting one star each for financial and accountability and transparency. Those same ratings repeated for the year ending December 2012.

The Southern Poverty Law Center designated the center as an anti-Muslim hate group in 2019, but by 2022 they had removed that designation and instead described it as a "general hate" group.
