= Ballot Measure 9 =

1995 documentary film

- Film poster
- Directed by: Heather Lyn MacDonald
- Produced by: Heather Lyn MacDonald
- Cinematography: Ellen Hansen
- Edited by: Heather Lyn MacDonald & BB Jorissen
- Music by: Julian Dylan Russell
- Distributed by: Sovereign Distribution
- Release date: 1995
- Running time: 72 minutes
- Country: United States
- Language: English

Ballot Measure 9 is a 1995 documentary film directed and produced by Heather MacDonald. The film examines the cultural and political battle that took place in 1992 over Oregon Ballot Measure 9, a citizens' initiative proposition that would have declared homosexuality "abnormal, wrong, unnatural, and perverse."

== Awards ==
- Audience Award at the Sundance Film Festival, 1995.
- Teddy Award at the Berlin International Film Festival, 1995.
- "Best of the Fest" at the Edinburgh International Film Festival, 1995.
- People's Choice Award at the Denver International Film Festival, 1995.
