= 1992 Oregon Ballot Measure 9 =

Referendum on gay rights

Measure 9
- Government Cannot Facilitate, Must Discourage Homosexuality, Other "Behaviors".

Results
Choice	Votes	%
Yes	638,527	43.53%
No	828,290	56.47%
Total votes	1,466,817	100.00%
County results
Yes
50–60%
60–70%
No
50–60%
60–70%

Oregon Ballot Measure 9 was a 1992 ballot initiative concerning LGBTQ rights in the state of Oregon. Sponsored by the Christian conservative group Oregon Citizens Alliance (OCA), the measure sought to amend the Oregon Constitution to prohibit anti-discrimination laws regarding sexual orientation and to declare homosexuality to be "abnormal, wrong, unnatural, and perverse". Listing homosexuality alongside pedophilia and sadism and masochism, it has been described as one of the harshest anti-gay measures presented to voters in American history.

The initiative was defeated by 56 percent to 44 percent in the 1992 general election. The OCA went on to successfully sponsor similar anti-LGBTQ initiatives in municipalities across Oregon. These local measures were later overruled by the state legislature. Opposition to Measure 9 was an early victory for the LGBTQ movement in the United States.

== Campaign ==
Measure 9 was an effort of the Oregon Citizens Alliance (OCA), a conservative group affiliated with the Christian Coalition that was active in Oregon politics in the 1990s. The initiative sought to amend the Oregon Constitution to prohibit anti-discrimination laws regarding sexual orientation and to declare homosexuality to be "abnormal, wrong, unnatural, and perverse". William Schultz, writing in Oregon Historical Quarterly, describes it as one of the most comprehensive and harshest anti-gay measures put to voters in American history.

Taking advantage of public hostility toward affirmative action, campaigners invoked the idea of "special rights" to imply that LGBTQ people wanted social advantages rather than mere equality. In this and similar campaigns, homosexuality was portrayed as a choice at odds with societal norms rather than an innate characteristic deserving of protection. The campaign made extensive use of a video titled The Gay Agenda produced by a California evangelical group, which featured scenes from gay pride parades chosen to portray gay men as hypermasculine and threatening. Another film titled Gay Rights–Special Rights: Inside the Homosexual Agenda (1993), produced by the Southern Baptist Convention, also circulated in the state.

Opponents outspent the OCA six to one. The measure was ultimately defeated, with 56 percent of voters voting against and 44 percent in support of the measure.

== Background ==
In 1991, OCA Chairman Lon Mabon announced an "Abnormal Behaviors Initiative" that would seek to prevent state and local governments from "condoning or promoting" homosexuality along with necrophilia, bestiality, or pedophilia. Mabon and the OCA sponsored initiatives restricting LGBTQ rights in the cities of Corvallis and Springfield in early 1992.

Supporters of Measure 9 felt that their traditional values were under siege in the face of growing acceptance of homosexuality by society. Also in 1992, voters in Colorado passed Amendment 2, a similar anti–LGBTQ rights measure. Christian Coalition director Ralph Reed believed these efforts could successfully counter the LGBTQ rights movement in the United States; he stated that, if successful, Measure 9 and Amendment 2 could "roll back and snuff out the homosexual rights movement".

The campaign for Measure 9 occurred in the midst of national discourse around "family values" and an economic downturn in which incumbent president George H. W. Bush sought to appeal to socially conservative voters. At the 1992 Republican National Convention, conservative commentator Pat Buchanan gave a speech saying, "There is a religious war going on in this country. It is a cultural war [...] this is a war for the soul of America". Bush stated his opposition to anti-discrimination laws protecting sexual orientation, while his opponent Bill Clinton expressed support for LGBTQ rights. In response to a question at a campaign event in Portland, Oregon, Clinton defended homosexuals' right to "live their lives and make a contribution to the rest of us".

Meanwhile, there was an increase in anti-LGBTQ hate crimes, threats, and harassment in Oregon, with targets including the Campaign for a Hate Free Oregon, CAP Northwest (the Cascade AIDS Project), Just Out, the Lesbian Community Project, the Portland chapter of the National Organization for Women, and the Portland Pride Parade.

== Reception ==
Measure 9 was opposed by Oregon's most prominent newspapers, including The Oregonian, which published an eleven-part series of editorials denouncing the measure. Opponents of Measure 9 said it was unfairly discriminatory and unconstitutional, and that it demonstrated the homophobia and bigotry of its backers. Fearing another failure after the first OCA-backed anti-gay measure passed in 1988, opponents of Measure 9 created the No on 9 Campaign, forming a coalition with the goal of defeating the measure. More than 100 groups had joined the No on 9 Campaign in August 1992, and by October that number had grown to over 200.

Christian groups and leaders were divided on the measure, with some in support and others opposed. The primary proponent of the measure was Oregon Citizens Alliance, a Christian group. Local Christians in support include the Eagle Forum, Pat Robertson's Christian Coalition of America, the evangelical group Concerned Women for America, Carol A. Petrone and Phillip Ramsdell of Oregon Catholics for Life, and some Assemblies of God. Out-of-state Christian supporters included Richard Cizik of the National Association of Evangelicals in Washington, Richard Land of the Southern Baptist Convention's Christian Life Commission, and Louis Sheldon of the Traditional Values Coalition. However, many Christians opposed the measure, including the state's United Church of Christ, African Methodist Episcopal Zion Church, Christian Church (Disciples of Christ), Church of the Brethren, Episcopal Church, Evangelical Lutheran Church in America, Metropolitan Community Church, Presbyterian Church, Reorganized Church of Jesus Christ of Latter day Saints, Roman Catholic Archdiocese of Portland, Society of Friends, United Church of Christ, and United Methodist Church. After a Catholic church in Hillsboro was vandalized with homophobic and anti-Catholic messaging, local Catholics began to oppose Measure 9, with some comparing the treatment of gay people to the history of the Oregon Ku Klux Klan harassing and attacking Catholics.

Some Republicans opposed the measure. Some opposed it because they were opposed to homophobia, while others cited a belief in limited government, constitutionalism, and/or the separation of church and state as their primary reason. Dave Frohnmayer, known as a prominent Oregon Republican, campaigned against Measure 9. Other Republican opponents included Vic Atiyeh, Craig Berkman, Neil Bryant, Allan "Punch" Green, then-Senators Mark Hatfield and Bob Packwood, Salem City Council member Dave Moss, Norma Paulus, Jack Roberts, and Kenneth Upton. Log Cabin Oregon, a Republican group, submitted a statement in opposition for the voter's pamphlet. Some Republicans, such as State Treasurer Tony Meeker, Senator Bob Packwood, and Congressman Bob Smith, attempted to remain "neutral" or changed their stances on the measure during the year prior to the election.

Many business leaders in Oregon were opposed to the measure, with many voicing concern that consumer boycotts of Oregon businesses would hurt the state's economy. Oregon businesses and leaders who voiced opposition included Powell's Books and US West Communications. Labor groups like the Oregon AFL–CIO and Oregon Public Employees Union were also opposed, as were some educators and librarians, such as Jane Howard of the Oregon Federation of Teachers, Education and Health Professionals; Karen Famous of the Oregon Education Association; and Deborah Jacobs of the Oregon Library Association. Other organizations, such as the American Civil Liberties Union (ACLU), National Lawyers Guild, and the Oregon Psychiatric Association, released statements opposing it. The Portland Gay Men's Chorus toured in protest of Measure 9, and the grunge rock band Nirvana played a benefit concert titled "No on #9".

== Legacy ==
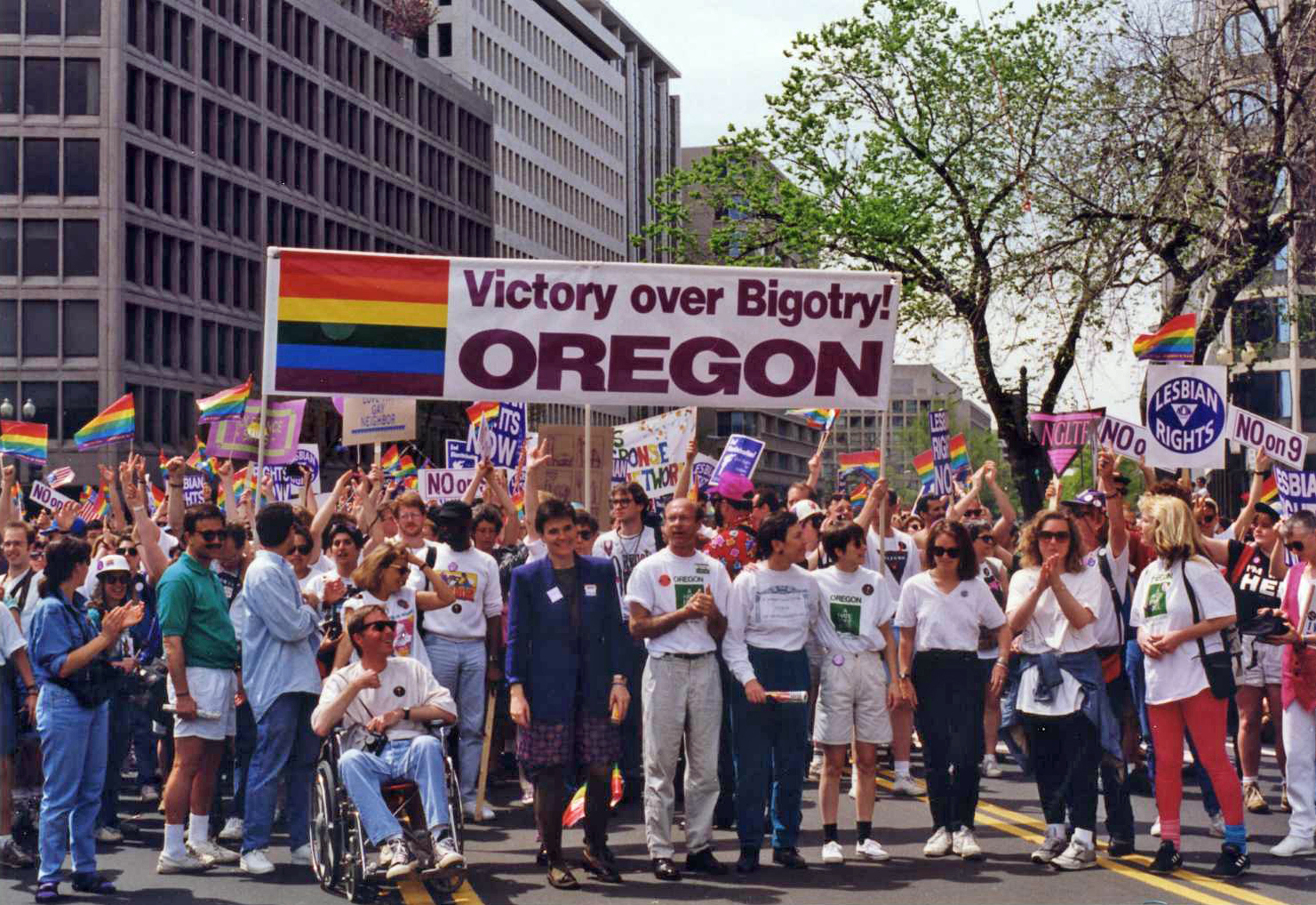
Banners and signs celebrating the defeat of Measure 9 at the March on Washington for Lesbian, Gay, and Bi Equal Rights and Liberation, April 1993

Even though Measure 9 failed, the campaign was described as divisive and politically polarizing, and was expected to have a negative impact on the state. Many LGBTQ people in Oregon said that they were distressed or afraid because of it. The campaign against Measure 9 was an early victory for the LGBTQ movement in the United States, and formed the basis of much of the gay rights movement in Oregon, including the organization Basic Rights Oregon.

Mabon and the OCA would go on to back additional anti-LGBTQ initiatives at the state and local level, which were often referred to as "the son of 9". These included the 1994 Oregon Ballot Measure 13, which would have prevented schools from using materials that were deemed to "legitimize homosexuality", and a second Oregon Ballot Measure 9 in 2000, which would have prohibited public schools in Oregon from "encouraging, promoting, or sanctioning homosexual and bisexual behaviors". While these statewide measures failed, the OCA succeeded in sponsoring anti-LGBTQ initiatives in parts of Oregon where a majority of voters had supported Measure 9. Such local measures were passed in Josephine, Douglas, Linn, and Klamath counties, as well as in Canby and Junction City. The Oregon Legislative Assembly overruled these local measures in 1993 with the passage of Oregon House Bill 3500, which barred municipalities from passing laws that would "single out citizens or groups of citizens on account of sexual orientation". HB 3500 was upheld by the Oregon Supreme Court in 1995.

== See also ==
- Ballot Measure 9 – 1995 documentary film
- 1978 California Proposition 6 – Failed Californian anti-gay ballot initiative
- 2008 California Proposition 8 – Successful referendum on banning same-sex marriage
- Gay agenda – Disparaging term used by opponents of gay rights activism
- List of Oregon ballot measures
- List of U.S. ballot initiatives to repeal LGBTQ anti-discrimination laws
- Opposition to LGBTQ rights
- Romer v. Evans – 1996 United States Supreme Court case
