= State v. Henry =

Court Case in Oregon

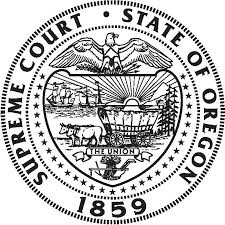
- Court: Oregon Supreme Court
- Full case name: State of Oregon v. Earl A. Henry
- Decided: January 21, 1987
- Citations: 302 Or. 510; 732 P.2d 9

Case history
- Subsequent action: none

Court membership
- Judges sitting: Edwin J. Peterson, Robert E. Jones

Case opinions
- Robert E. Jones

State v. Henry was a 1987 decision of the Oregon Supreme Court which held that the Oregon state law that criminalized obscenity was unconstitutional because it violated the free speech provision of the Oregon Constitution. The ruling made Oregon the first (and only state as of 2022) to abolish the offense of obscenity in its state law, although obscenity remains a federal offense.

== Background ==
The case came about when the owner of an adult bookstore, Earl Henry, was charged and convicted of obscenity (specifically for possessing and distributing obscene materials) after police raided his store. He was fined $2,000 and sentenced to 60 days in jail but was allowed to remain free pending an appeal. The ACLU of Oregon filed an appeal to the Oregon Supreme Court on Mr. Henry's behalf arguing that the Oregon Constitution's free speech clause (Article 1, Section 8) provides greater protection than the free speech clause found in the First Amendment to the United States Constitution and that "state courts should interpret and develop state law under their state constitutions without regard to the swings in interpretation at the national level", especially when state constitutions provide greater protections than the federal one.

No law shall be passed restraining the free expression of opinion, or restricting the right to speak, write, or print freely on any subject whatever; but every person shall be responsible for the abuse of this right.

— Oregon Constitution, Art. I §8

== Ruling ==
In a unanimous (7–0) ruling on January 21, 1987, the Oregon Supreme Court agreed that "the text of the state constitution was "broader" than the text of the First Amendment and dismissed the charges against Earl Henry. The court's ruling declared that the state's obscenity statute was unconstitutional with the majority opinion noting that:

In this state any person can write, print, read, say, show or sell anything to a consenting adult even though that expression may be generally or universally 'obscene.'

The court further explained that "no criminal law could outlaw a certain category of speech unless that speech represented a "historically established exception" to the general guarantee of freedom of expression afforded by the state constitution", noting that "The very fact that 'obscenity' originally was pursued and repressed for its 'anti-establishment' irreverence rather than for its bawdiness elsewhere and only to protect the morals of youth in this state leads us to conclude that no broad or all-encompassing historical exception from the guarantees of free expression was ever intended."

== Aftermath ==
Oregon Ballot Measure 19 (1994) and Oregon Ballot Measure 31 (1996) attempted to amend the free speech provision of the Oregon Constitution so that it no longer protected obscenity but both measures failed and no other changes have been proposed since.
