= 2004 Oregon Ballot Measure 36 =

Referendum to ban same-sex marriage

Measure 36
- November 2, 2004
- Amends Constitution: Only Marriage Between One Man and One Woman Is Valid or Legally Recognized as Marriage

Results
Choice	Votes	%
Yes	1,028,546	56.63%
No	787,556	43.37%
Valid votes	1,816,102	98.08%
Invalid or blank votes	35,569	1.92%
Total votes	1,851,671	100.00%
Registered voters/turnout	2,141,249	84.82%
County results
Yes
70–80%
60–70%
50–60%
No
50–60%

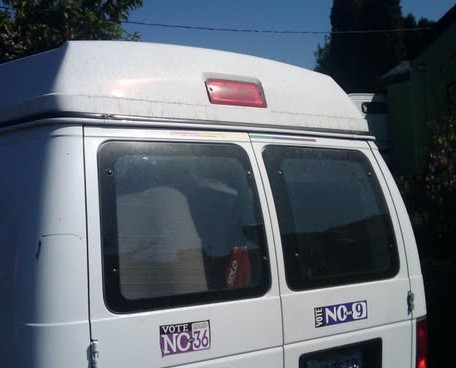
A van in 2009 displays bumper stickers against Measure 9 and Measure 36.

Ballot Measure 36 was a 2004 initiative in the U.S. state of Oregon. It amended the Oregon Constitution to define marriage as a union of one man and one woman. The initiative passed with 1,028,546 votes in favor, and 787,556 votes against (57% to 43%) in the November 2, 2004 general election, passing in all but two counties: Benton (Corvallis, home of Oregon State University), and Multnomah (Portland). It is one of a number of U.S. state constitutional amendments banning same-sex marriage. However, unlike other similar ballot measures passed on or near the same election date, the amendment did not explicitly ban civil unions between same-sex couples.

On May 19, 2014, the measure was declared unconstitutional by a U.S. federal district court judge, who ruled that it violated the Equal Protection Clause of the Fourteenth Amendment to the United States Constitution.

== Results ==
Measure 36
Choice	Votes	%
For	1,028,546	56.63
Against	787,556	43.37
Total	1,816,102	100.00
Registered voters/turnout	2,550,887	71.19

== Amendment to Constitution ==
Measure 36 added the following text to Article 15 of the Oregon Constitution, as Section 5a:

Policy regarding marriage. It is the policy of Oregon, and its political subdivisions, that only a marriage between one man and one woman shall be valid or legally recognized as a marriage. [Created through initiative petition filed March 2, 2004, and adopted by the people Nov. 2, 2004]

== Political context ==
The measure was placed on the ballot through an initiative petition brought by the Oregon Defense of Marriage Coalition, a group dedicated to "preserving marriage as a union only between one man and one woman." The group was formed in reaction to same-sex marriages performed in Multnomah County and Benton County after their respective county commissions interpreted the Oregon Constitution and Oregon law as authorizing the issuing of marriage licenses to same-sex couples. Supporters of the measure, in addition to opposing same-sex marriage on principle, were also angry by the controversial means by which the Multnomah County Commission had come to its decision: no public hearings were held before the commission voted to allow the marriages and one of the commissioners, Lonnie Roberts, was not informed of the move until after the other commissioners began issuing licenses. Roberts criticized the "clandestine way" that the decision was made and speculated that he had not been included in the discussion because the other commissioners knew that he wouldn't support their decision. Supporters also wanted to prevent the state courts from coming to the same conclusion as the county commissions—that the state constitution and law required the government to license same-sex marriage—before several standing civil rights lawsuits on the issue could be resolved.

Basic Rights Oregon led the campaign against Measure 36. Opponents of the measure made several arguments. Many were supporters of same-sex marriage. In addition, some argued that regardless of voters' feelings on same-sex marriage, the state constitution was an inappropriate place to dictate marriage policy, which should have been statutory. Opponents also argued that the measure added discriminatory language to the state constitution, which, they predicted, would later be seen in the same negative light as earlier constitutional language against African Americans. They also feared that the measure could be used as a legal basis for denying benefits to same-sex couples which are automatically granted to heterosexual married couples.

According to Daniel June in JD Journal, Judge Harry Pregerson effectively undermined the ban by declaring it unconstitutional, when he ruled in favor of Allison Clark that she should receive the same work benefits with her homosexual partner as heterosexual couples would receive.

On May 19, 2014, United States District Judge Michael McShane ruled that Oregon's constitutional ban on same-sex marriage was unconstitutional. Since then, same-sex marriage has been legally recognized in Oregon.

== Satirical arguments ==
Marvin Dennis Moore, a Portland church organist, wrote satirical arguments on several Oregon ballot measures, including Measure 36. Moore's arguments, ostensibly in favor of the measure, were printed in the official voters' pamphlet. For example, reacting to some supporters' claims that the purpose of marriage is for procreation, he argues that "couples who fail to conceive within two years ought to have their marriage licenses revoked." Measure 36 supporters criticized the placement of Moore's arguments in the "Arguments in Favor" section of the pamphlet, but the Oregon Secretary of State's Office countered they had no choice under the law but to print his arguments as specified.

== See also ==
- Same-sex marriage in Oregon
- List of Oregon ballot measures
- Same-sex marriage in the United States
- Same-sex marriage legislation in the United States
- Same-sex marriage in the United States by state
- Same-sex marriage in the United States public opinion
- Same-sex marriage status in the United States by state
- List of benefits of marriage in the United States
- Defense of Marriage Act
- Marriage Protection Act
- Federal Marriage Amendment
- Domestic partnerships in the United States
- Freedom to Marry Coalition
- History of civil marriage in the U.S.
- Karen Minnis
