= LGBTQ rights in Oregon =

- Oregon (US)
- Legal status: Legal since 1972
- Gender identity: Transgender people allowed to change gender, surgery not required
- Discrimination protections: Sexual orientation and gender identity are protected categories

Family rights
- Recognition of relationships: Domestic partnerships since 2008; Same-sex marriage since 2014
- Adoption: Same-sex couples may jointly adopt

Lesbian, gay, bisexual, and transgender, and queer (LGBTQ) people in the U.S. state of Oregon have the same legal rights as non-LGBTQ people. Oregon became one of the first U.S. jurisdictions to decriminalize sodomy in 1972, and same-sex marriage has been legal in the state since May 2014 when a federal judge declared the state's ban on such marriages unconstitutional. Previously, same-sex couples could only access domestic partnerships, which guaranteed most of the rights of marriage. Additionally, same-sex couples are allowed to jointly adopt, and discrimination based on sexual orientation and gender identity in the areas of employment, housing and public accommodations is outlawed in the state under the Oregon Equality Act, enacted in 2008. Conversion therapy on minors is also illegal.

Oregon is frequently referred to as one of the United States' most LGBTQ-friendly states, and is home to an active LGBTQ community with multiple bars, clubs, venues, events and other establishments. Governor Kate Brown (served 2015–2023) was the nation's first openly bisexual governor. A 2019 opinion poll conducted by the Public Religion Research Institute showed that 70% of Oregonians supported anti-discrimination legislation protecting LGBTQ people.

== History ==
During European settlement of Oregon in the late 18th and early 19th centuries, the region was infamous for its "temptation towards immorality", mostly due to its overwhelmingly male population. Among the Native Americans, perceptions towards gender and sexuality were very different from those of the Western world. The Northern Paiute people, for instance, recognize male-bodied individuals who act, behave and live as women, known as tüdayapi. Similarly, among the Modoc and the Klamath peoples, t'winiːq individuals form a "third gender" alongside male and female.

Oregon, then known as the Oregon Territory, adopted its first criminal code in 1850. It made no mention of sodomy or common law crimes. This changed in 1853, when the Oregon Territorial Legislature passed laws criminalizing sodomy with one to five years' imprisonment. This was later extended to one to fifteen years' imprisonment, after the Portland vice scandal. In 1913, the Oregon Supreme Court, in State v. Start, held that fellatio (oral sex), whether heterosexual or homosexual, also constituted an offence, and similarly in 1928 that mutual masturbation was also criminal. In addition to imprisonment, sterilization became a possible penalty for sodomy in 1913, though this was later repealed by voters with a 56% majority. Nonetheless, a similar law was passed in 1917, but was declared unconstitutional in 1921. Up until then, 127 sterilizations had been carried out in the state, many on "flagrant masturbators or sex perverts". Oregon accounted for about 92% of the total castrations performed in the United States between 1907 and 1921. The state enacted another sterilization law in 1923, providing for the castration or oophorectomy of "[...] moral degenerates and sexual perverts". By 1960, 2,293 people had been sterilized under this law, most of them women. The law was amended in 1965, and was made applicable only to the "mentally ill and the mentally retarded". Cunnilingus was found to be a violation of the sodomy law in 1961, in the case of State v. Black.

In 1953, Oregon passed a psychopathic offender law, under which those convicted of sodomy could receive a life sentence. This was amended ten years later to apply only to sexual activity with children under the age of 12.

== Law regarding same-sex sexual activity ==
Oregon decriminalized same-sex sexual activity in 1972.

Renewed debate surrounding the state's sodomy law began in the 1970s. The Criminal Law Revision Commission was of the opinion that "any sexual conduct engaged in between consenting adults, whether of a heterosexual or homosexual nature" should not be outlawed. This received notably little opposition, with reportedly only one person testifying against it. In 1971, the Oregon Legislative Assembly repealed the consensual sodomy law and established an age of consent of 18, effective in 1972. At the same time, it also passed a controversial "lewd solicitation" provision, making it a criminal offence to invite a person in a public place to have sexual intercourse. This provision was declared unconstitutional by the Oregon Supreme Court on free speech grounds in a unanimous decision in 1981.

== Recognition of same-sex relationships ==
Same-sex marriage was legalized in Oregon on May 19, 2014, after U.S. District Court Judge Michael McShane ruled that the state's 2004 constitutional amendment banning such marriages was unconstitutional in relation to the Equal Protection Clause of the Federal Constitution. Prior to that ruling, same-sex marriage was prohibited by the State Constitution due to the passage of Ballot Measure 36 on November 2, 2004. Proponents had formed a campaign to place a same-sex marriage initiative on the ballot in November 2014, but those plans were cancelled because of the May 2014 ruling legalizing marriage for same-sex couples in the state.

Domestic partnerships for same-sex couples have been available since February 4, 2008, when the Oregon Family Fairness Act took effect.

Oregon has provided benefits to same-sex partners of state employees since 1998.

Since October 16, 2013, based on an opinion from the state Department of Justice, Oregon has recognized same-sex marriages from other jurisdictions. In July 2015, the Oregon Legislative Assembly passed a bill to codify gender-neutral marriage in various state statutes, effective from January 1, 2016.

In April 2023, a bill passed both houses of the Oregon Legislative Assembly to allow opposite-sex couples to formally enter into a domestic partnerships. The bill was signed into law by the Governor of Oregon and went into effect on January 1, 2024.

== Adoption and parenting ==
Same-sex couples, whether unmarried or married, may apply to adopt. Lesbian couples have access to assisted reproduction services, such as in vitro fertilization, and state law recognizes the non-genetic, non-gestational mother as a legal parent to a child born via donor insemination, but only if the parents are married.

Surrogacy is neither expressly prohibited nor permitted in Oregon. However, courts are generally favorable to surrogacy, which means both the surrogate and the intended parents, including same-sex couples, can pursue a surrogacy arrangement in the state.

In July 2025 the 9th U.S. Circuit Court of Appeals ruled the State's adoption requirement to “respect, accept and support” a child's gender expression and sexual orientation was unconstitutional. The lawsuit was the result of Oregon Department of Human Services preventing an Oregon woman seeking to adopt.

== Discrimination protections ==
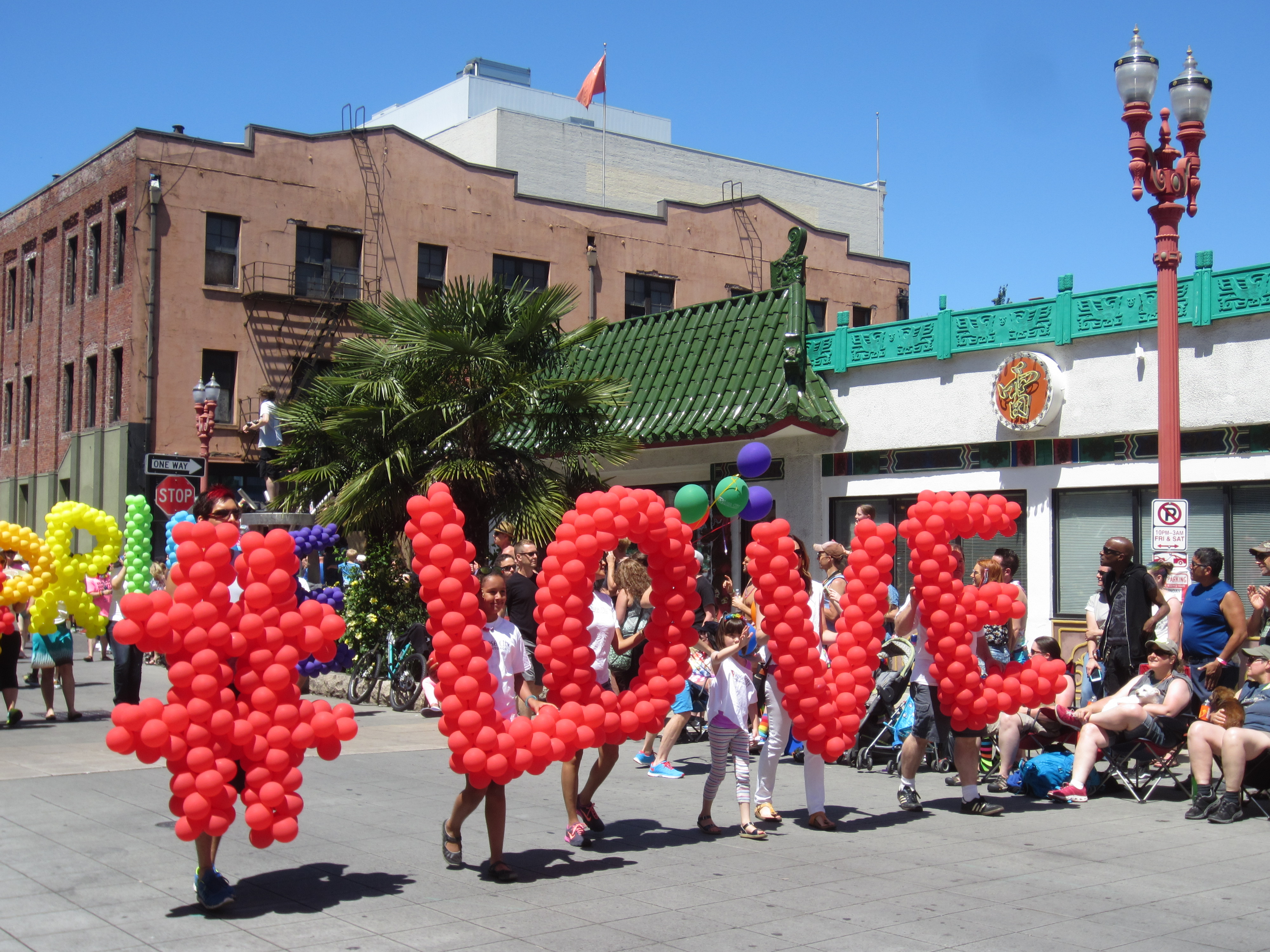
Portland Pride parade 2015

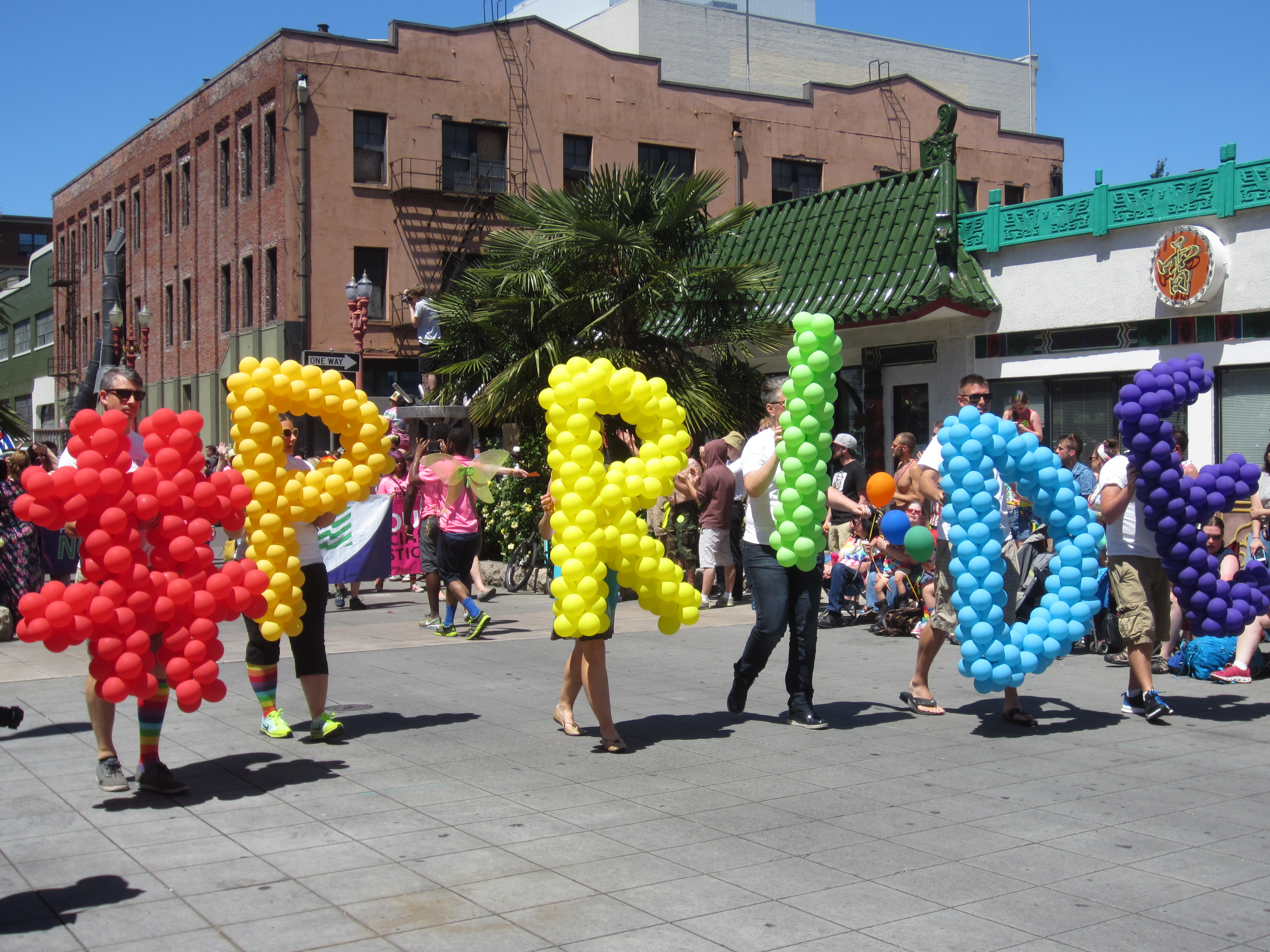
Participants at the Portland Pride parade, 2015

Since January 1, 2008, Oregon has banned unfair discrimination in employment, housing, and public accommodations based on sexual orientation or gender identity. The protections were added by the Oregon Equality Act, signed into law by Governor Ted Kulongoski on May 9, 2007. "Sexual orientation" is defined under state law as "an individual's actual or perceived heterosexuality, homosexuality, bisexuality or gender identity, regardless of whether the individual's gender identity, appearance, expression or behavior differs from that traditionally associated with the individual's assigned sex at birth." The City of Portland enacted an anti-discrimination ordinance effective since April 10, 2026, that legally protects polyamorous and consensually non-monogamous families and diverse relationship structures from discrimination within housing, employment, and public accommodations - alongside sexual orientation and gender identities explicitly included.

Moreover, the state's anti-bullying law prohibits bullying on the basis of race, color, religion, sex, sexual orientation, national origin, marital status, familial status, source of income and disability. The law also explicitly includes cyberbullying and harassment, and applies to all public schools.

In October 2019, Governor Kate Brown signed an executive order to add gender identity to a 1987 policy that prohibits state agencies from engaging in unlawful discrimination (in hiring, the provision of public services, or any government-related interactions). The order had already included sexual orientation. Agencies will also be required an include a third gender option ("X") as a sex descriptor.

In June 2021, the Oregon Legislative Assembly passed a bill to update the 2008 legal definition of "gender identity". The Governor of Oregon Kate Brown signed the bill into law and becomes effective immediately.

Effective from January 1, 2022, a law (that was overturned by the courts on May 11, 2022) banning real estate agents (buying or selling) from sharing documents that include protected class information that could lead to intentional or unintentional discrimination against clients and/or individuals due to sexual orientation and gender identity grounds - that the Governor of Oregon Kate Brown signed a bill (HB2550) into law in June 2021.

== Criminal justice ==
=== Hate crime law ===
State hate crime statutes provide for additional legal penalties for crimes committed based on the victim's gender identity or sexual orientation (alongside other categories, such as religion, race, disability and/or sex).

=== Gay or trans panic defense abolition ===
In May 2021, both the Oregon Legislature passed and the Governor of Oregon Kate Brown signed the bill SB704 into law, effective January 1, 2022. The law abolishes the archaic common-law "gay panic defense" and/or "trans panic defense" within murder, manslaughter, and hate crime legal cases in all Oregon court rooms for judges, lawyers, and juries.

== Transgender rights ==
In January 2013, as part of an out-of-court settlement in a discrimination suit with a public employee related to medical insurance coverage of a gender-affirming surgery, the state agreed to provide full medical insurance coverage for all such surgeries, drugs, and related treatments for individuals covered on public employee health plans.

Since 2014, sex reassignment surgery has not been a requirement to change the gender marker on an Oregon birth certificate. Transgender individuals can apply to change their legal gender solely by request. In addition, in August 2014, state officials announced that Oregon Medicaid would shortly begin covering gender-affirming hormone therapy and other gender-affirming healthcare.

On June 10, 2016, an Oregon circuit court ruled that a resident could legally change their gender to non-binary. The Transgender Law Center believed this to be "the first ruling of its kind in the U.S." Since July 1, 2017, the Oregon Department of Motor Vehicles has offered a third choice for gender on driver's licenses and IDs: "X", designating a neutral or non-binary gender identity. The "X" option is also available for birth certificates.

In May 2017, a bill passed the Oregon Legislative Assembly to abolish the 1991 requirement for transgender people to publish their names in newspapers before they can undergo a legal change of sex on government documents. This requirement was viewed as a breach of privacy and a safety risk for transgender people. In January 2019, Representative Karin Power introduced a bill to amend a 1951 Oregon mental health law that equated "transvestites" with pedophilia. In April 2019, the bill passed the Legislative Assembly by a vote of 58–2 in the House and 29–0 with 1 excused in the Senate. Governor Kate Brown signed it into law on May 6.

In December 2020, the U.S. Supreme Court denied certiorari to Parents for Privacy v. Barr, a case that had challenged a transgender-inclusive policy in public schools. The United States District Court for the District of Oregon had ruled against the plaintiffs on July 24, 2018; a decision upheld by the Ninth Circuit Court of Appeals on February 12, 2020.

In May 2023, amid a national anti-LGBTQ backlash, the Oregon House of Representatives passed a bill to explicitly "protect and defend" gender-affirming healthcare for transgender individuals, especially those who enter into Oregon jurisdictional boundaries from other states. The bill was essentially "frozen" in the Oregon Senate for a time because the Republican representatives staged the longest boycott in Oregon history. In late June, the boycott ended and the bill finally passed the Senate with "watered down amendments". The House agreed to pass the amendments, and Governor Tina Kotek signed the bill into law on July 13, 2023.

In July 2025, the 9th U.S. Circuit Court of Appeals ruled the State's adoption requirement to “respect, accept and support” a child's gender expression and sexual orientation was unconstitutional.

=== Sports ===
In June 2025, the U.S. Department of Education announced a Title IX investigation into Oregon Department of Education for allowing transgender women to compete in women's sports.

== Conversion therapy ==
Oregon became the third state to ban performing sexual orientation change efforts (conversion therapy) on minors. In 2015, the Legislative Assembly passed a bill banning conversion therapy on minors. The bill passed the House by a vote of 41–18 on March 17 and the Senate by a vote of 21–8 on May 7. On May 18, 2015, Governor Kate Brown signed the bill into law, and it went into effect on July 1, 2015.

== Education ==
In June 2021, a bill (SB52) passed the Oregon Legislative Assembly to implement LGBTIQ+ safe policies and procedures by the Oregon Department of Education - within all the schools, universities, and colleges throughout Oregon. The Governor Kate Brown signed the bill into law in July 2021 and it went into effect immediately.

== Book Protection Law ==
In June 2025, a bill passed the Oregon Legislature that would explicitly “protect books from being banned, censored, destroyed and/or removed from library shelves”. The Governor of Oregon signed the bill into law, and it went into effect immediately, one week after the Legislature approved the bill. California, Illinois, Washington State, Minnesota, Maryland, and New York State have also enacted similar legislation.

== Politics ==
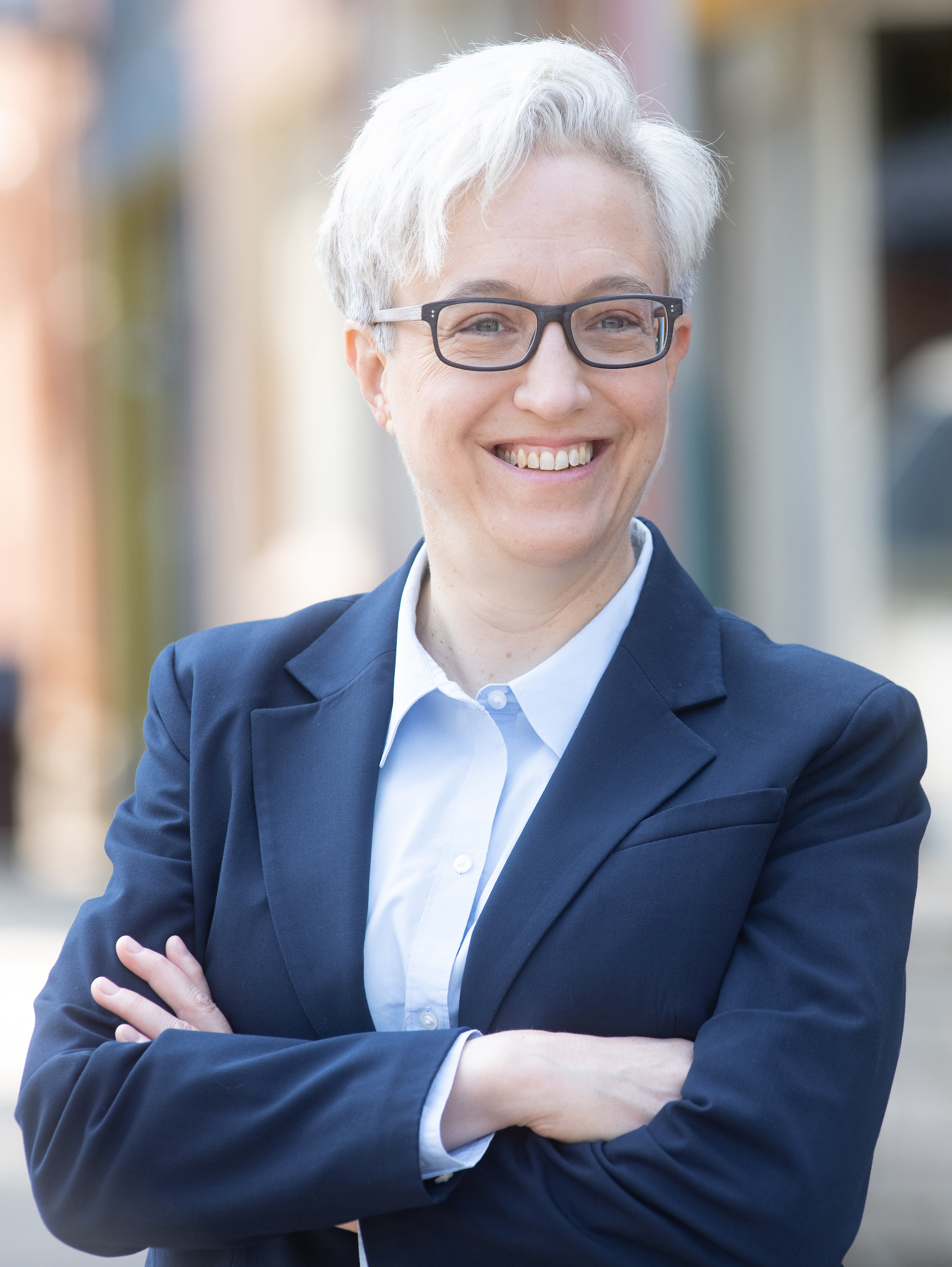
The 39th Governor of Oregon, Tina Kotek (pictured in 2021), is openly lesbian

Oregon's governor, Tina Kotek, is openly lesbian, married to her spouse Aimee Wilson. Former Oregon Governor Kate Brown was the first openly bisexual governor in United States history. Michael McShane, the judge who struck down Oregon's same-sex marriage ban, is also openly gay. Sam Adams was Portland's first openly gay city councilor and the first openly gay mayor of a top-30 U.S. city.

== Public opinion ==
A 2022 Public Religion Research Institute (PRRI) opinion poll found that 78% of Oregon residents supported same-sex marriage, while 22% were opposed. Additionally, 86% of Oregon residents supported discrimination protections covering sexual orientation and gender identity, while 13% were opposed and 1% were unsure.

Public opinion for LGBTQ anti-discrimination laws in Oregon
Poll source	Date(s) administered	Sample size	Margin of error	% support	% opposition	% no opinion
Public Religion Research Institute	January 2-December 30, 2019	854	?	70%	23%	7%
Public Religion Research Institute	January 3-December 30, 2018	1,006	?	72%	23%	5%
Public Religion Research Institute	April 5-December 23, 2017	1,130	?	72%	21%	7%
Public Religion Research Institute	April 29, 2015-January 7, 2016	1,296	?	77%	16%	7%

== Summary table ==
Same-sex sexual activity legal with an equal age of consent	Yes (Since 1972)
Anti-discrimination laws for both sexual orientation and gender identity	Yes (Since 2008)
Repealed the “defunct” state Constitutional ban on same sex marriage	X
Same-sex marriages enacted by legislation, but a “defunct ban” under the state Constitution remains	Yes (Since 2014)
Recognition of same-sex couples (e.g. domestic partnership)	Yes (Since 2008)
Full parentage and adoption rights for children of same-sex couples, regardless of marital status	Yes (Since 2007)
Ban on book bans implemented	Yes (Since 2025)
Lesbian, gay and bisexual people allowed to serve openly in the military	Yes (Since 2011)
Transgender people allowed to serve openly in the military	(Since 2025, by an executive order and SCOTUS decision)
Intersex people allowed to serve openly in the military	(Current DoD policy bans "hermaphrodites" from serving or enlisting in the military)
Conversion therapy banned on minors	Yes (Since 2015)
Abolished the common-law "gay or trans panic defence"	Yes (Since 2022)
Right to change legal gender and a third gender or "gender X" options on both driver's licences and birth certificates	Yes (Since 2017)
Intersex individuals legally protected from genital mutilations, especially babies	No
Access to IVF for lesbian couples	Yes
Surrogacy arrangements for gay male couples	Yes
MSMs allowed to donate blood	Yes (Since 2023, on the condition of being monogamous)

== See also ==
- Hands Across Hawthorne
- Oregon Citizens Alliance
- LGBTQ culture in Portland, Oregon
- LGBTQ culture in Eugene, Oregon
- LGBTQ culture in Salem, Oregon
