= Oregon Equality Act =

Oregon anti-discrimination law that became effective in 2008

The Oregon Equality Act is a law of the U.S. state of Oregon which prohibits discrimination based on sexual orientation and gender identity in employment, housing, public accommodations, and other categories. It was enacted in 2007 and came into effect in 2008.

The act passed during the 74th Oregon Legislative Assembly. Senate Bill 2 was introduced on March 5, 2007 in the Oregon Senate, where it was approved on March 21 in a 21–7 vote. The Oregon House of Representatives amended the bill and voted 35–25 to approve it on April 17. The Oregon Senate voted 19–7 on April 19 to approve the amended bill. Governor Ted Kulongoski signed it on May 9, 2007 along with the Oregon Family Fairness Act, and it took effect on January 1, 2008.

== See also ==
- Employment Non-Discrimination Act
- LGBTQ rights in Oregon
- Oregon Family Fairness Act
