= 1978 California Proposition 6 =

Failed Californian anti-gay ballot initiative

California Proposition 6
- November 7, 1978
- Restricts gays and lesbians from working in California's public schools.

Results
Choice	Votes	%
Yes	2,823,293	41.57%
No	3,969,120	58.43%
Valid votes	6,792,413	95.24%
Invalid or blank votes	339,797	4.76%
Total votes	7,132,210	100.00%
Registered voters/turnout		70.41%
- County results Yes: 50–60% 60–70% No: 50–60% 60–70% 70–80%

California Proposition 6, informally known as the Briggs Initiative, was an unsuccessful ballot initiative put to a referendum on the California state ballot in the November 7, 1978, election. It was sponsored by John Briggs, a conservative state legislator from Orange County. The failed initiative sought to ban gay men and lesbians from working in California's public schools.

Openly gay San Francisco politician Harvey Milk and Sally Miller Gearhart, as well as many other gay and lesbian activists of the time, were instrumental in fighting the measure. Opposition to the proposition from a variety of public figures, including then-former California Governor Ronald Reagan and President Jimmy Carter, helped to swing public opinion against it.

== Background ==
Singer and Florida Citrus Commission spokesperson Anita Bryant received national news coverage for her successful efforts to repeal a Dade County, Florida ordinance preventing discrimination based on sexual orientation. This success sparked additional efforts to repeal legislation that added sexual orientation or preference as a protected group to anti-discrimination statutes and codes. In a step beyond repeal of anti-discrimination measures, Oklahoma and Arkansas banned gays and lesbians from teaching in public schools. The idea for the Briggs Initiative was formed during the success of the repeal of the Dade County anti-discrimination language.

The measure was the first attempt to restrict gay and lesbian rights through a statewide ballot measure.

== Text ==
The initiative provided that a public school teacher, teacher's aide, administrator, or counselor could be fired if the employee was found to have engaged in either (1) "public homosexual activity", which the initiative defined as an act of homosexual sex which was "not discreet and not practiced in private, whether or not such act, at the time of its commission, constituted a crime", or (2) "public homosexual conduct", which the initiative defined as "the advocating, soliciting, imposing, encouraging or promoting of private or public homosexual activity directed at, or likely to come to the attention of, schoolchildren and/or other employees".

The employee would be terminated if the school board, after a hearing, determined by a preponderance of the evidence that the employee had engaged in "public homosexual activity" or "public homosexual conduct" and "that said activity or conduct render[ed] the employee unfit for service". The factors that the board would consider in the determination of "unfitness for service" would "include, but not be limited to: (1) the likelihood that the activity or conduct may adversely affect students or other employees; (2) the proximity or remoteness in time or location of the conduct to the employee's responsibilities; (3) the extenuating or aggravating circumstances which, in the judgment of the board, must be examined in weighing the evidence; and (4) whether the conduct included acts, words or deeds, of a continuing or comprehensive nature which would tend to encourage, promote or dispose schoolchildren toward private or public homosexual activity or private or public homosexual conduct".

The initiative further provided that a person could not be hired as a public school teacher, teacher's aide, administrator, or counselor if the person had "engaged in public homosexual activity or public homosexual conduct should the board determine that said activity or conduct render[ed] the person unfit for service".

== Campaign ==
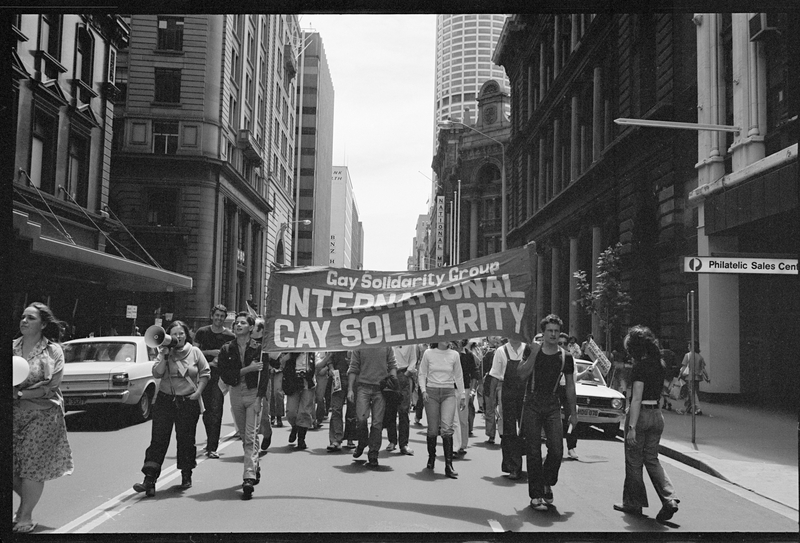
November 1978: Gay Solidarity Group supporters march in Sydney, Australia to protest the Briggs Initiative.

A coalition of activists including Sally Gearhart, Gwenn Craig, Bill Kraus, openly gay San Francisco Supervisor Harvey Milk, teacher (later president of San Francisco Board of Supervisors) Tom Ammiano, and Hank Wilson mobilized under the slogan "Come out! Come out! Wherever you are!" to defeat the initiative. In what became the No On 6 campaign, gay men and lesbians went door to door in their cities and towns across the state to talk about the harm the initiative would cause.

Gay men and lesbians came out to their families, neighbors, and co-workers; spoke in their churches and community centers; sent letters to their local editors; and otherwise revealed to the general population that gay people really were "everywhere" and included people they already knew and cared about. In the beginning of September, the ballot measure was ahead in public opinion polls, with about 61% of voters supporting it while 31% opposed it. The movement against it initially succeeded little in shifting public opinion, even though major organizations and ecclesiastical groups opposed it. By the end of the month, however, the balance of the polls shifted to 45% in favor of the initiative, 43% opposed, and 12% undecided.

A diverse group of politicians including Ronald Reagan, Jerry Brown, Gerald Ford, and then-president Jimmy Carter all opposed the bill.

Some gay Republicans also became organized against the initiative on a grassroots level. The most prominent of these, the Log Cabin Republicans, was founded in 1977 in California, as a rallying point for Republicans opposed to the Briggs Initiative. The Log Cabin Club then lobbied Republican officials to oppose the measure.

The former State Governor (and later US President) Ronald Reagan moved to publicly oppose the measure. Reagan issued an informal letter of opposition to the initiative, answered reporters' questions about the initiative by saying he was against, and, a week before the election, wrote an editorial in the Los Angeles Herald-Examiner opposing it.

The timing of Reagan's opposition is significant because he was then preparing to run for president in the 1980 Presidential Election, a race in which he would need the support of conservatives and those moderates who were very uncomfortable with homosexual teachers. At that very moment, he was actively courting leaders from the religious right, including Jerry Falwell, who would go on to form the Moral Majority to fight out such culture war issues the following year. As Reagan biographer Lou Cannon puts it, Reagan was "well aware that there were those who wanted him to duck the issue" but nevertheless "chose to state his convictions". Cannon reports that Reagan was "repelled by the aggressive public crusades against homosexual life styles which became a staple of right wing politics in the late 1970s". However, prominent LGBTQ activist David Mixner later noted how he secretly met with Reagan during this time and persuaded him to oppose the measure.

Extensive excerpts from his informal statement were reprinted in the San Francisco Chronicle of September 24, 1978. Reagan's November 1 editorial stated, in part, "Whatever else it is, homosexuality is not a contagious disease like the measles. Prevailing scientific opinion is that an individual's sexuality is determined at a very early age and that a child's teachers do not really influence this."

While polls initially had shown support for the initiative leading by a large margin, it was defeated heavily following opposition by the gay community and prominent conservatives, moderates, and liberals alike.

== Outcome ==
The initiative was defeated with 58 percent of the electorate voting against it. The measure failed to gain majority support even in Briggs's own Orange County, at the time a conservative stronghold.

Proposition 6
Choice	Votes	%
For	2,823,293	41.57
Against	3,969,120	58.43
Total	6,792,413	100.00
Valid votes	6,792,413	95.24
Invalid/blank votes	339,797	4.76
Total votes	7,132,210	100.00
Registered voters/turnout		70.41

== See also ==
- 1992 Oregon Ballot Measure 9 – Referendum on gay rights
- 2000 California Proposition 22 – Referendum banning same-sex marriage
- 2008 California Proposition 8 – Successful referendum on banning same-sex marriage
- Far-right politics in the United States
- Florida Parental Rights in Education Act – Florida statute commonly known as the "Don't Say Gay" bill
- Milk (2008 American film) – 2008 film by Gus Van Sant
- National Gay Task Force v. Board of Education – U.S. Court of Appeals decision on discrimination against gay teachers
- Ruth Shack – American politician (1931–2026)
- Section 28 – Former British anti-homosexuality law

== Bibliography ==
- Jones, Cleve, with Dawson, Jeff (2000). Stitching a Revolution: The Making of an Activist. ISBN 0062516426
- Milk, Harvey (2013). An Archive of Hope: Harvey Milk's Speeches and Writings. University of California Press. ISBN 978-0-520-27548-5. (Includes three articles, two speeches, and a ballot argument written by Milk against the Briggs Initiative.)
- Milk, Harvey (2012). The Harvey Milk Interviews: In His Own Words, Vince Emery Productions. ISBN 978-0-9725898-8-8 (Includes transcripts from three debates between Harvey Milk and John Briggs, and an interview with Milk about the Briggs Initiative.)
- Shilts, Randy (1982). The Mayor of Castro Street: The Life and Times of Harvey Milk, St. Martin's Press. ISBN 0-312-52330-0
