= Oregon Family Fairness Act =

U.S. state of Oregon's state law about domestic partnership

The Oregon Family Fairness Act is a state law in the U.S. state of Oregon that made domestic partnerships legal in Oregon. The bill was introduced into the House by state Democrats. The bill adopted the term "domestic partnership" to describe these unions; the terms "marriage" or "civil union" were absent.

This bill enjoyed a relatively easy passage through the legislature, when compared to its 2005 predecessor. Passed by the House on April 17, 2007 (by a vote of 34-26) and by the Senate on May 2, 2007 (by a vote of 21-9), Governor Ted Kulongoski signed the Oregon Family Fairness Act on May 9, 2007. The law was scheduled to take effect January 1, 2008, but was delayed by a preliminary injunction until after a hearing on February 1, 2008, where the injunction was lifted. Domestic partnerships became effective from February 4, 2008.

== See also ==
- Domestic partnership in Oregon
- LGBT rights in Oregon
- Oregon Equality Act
