= Charter Amendment One (Gainesville, Florida) =

Amendment 1
- Amendment to the City Charter Prohibiting the City from Providing Certain Civil Rights

Results
Choice	Votes	%
Yes	8,382	41.67%
No	11,732	58.33%
Valid votes	20,114	99.42%
Invalid or blank votes	118	0.58%
Total votes	20,232	100.00%
Registered voters/turnout	75,219	26.9%

Charter Amendment One was a citizen-led referendum defeated in Gainesville, Florida's city election on March 24, 2009. Titled the "Amendment to the City Charter Prohibiting the City from Providing Certain Civil Rights," the measure would remove the legal protections not explicitly covered under the Florida Civil Rights Act of 1992, specifically with reference to sexual orientation and gender identity.

The amendment was a key issue of debate in the elections and attracted national attention to social controversies in Gainesville, Florida that continued through the mayoral election in 2010.

The amendment was viewed as a test of LGBT rights in Florida following the passage of Florida Amendment 2 which banned same-sex unions the previous year.

== History ==
In January 2008, the Gainesville City Commission narrowly voted to add gender identity to the list of protected groups in its city discrimination ordinance. Gainesville's discrimination ordinance forbids discrimination in access to public accommodation, housing, credit and employment for ten different categories.

Going back to the early 1990s, the debate over LGBT rights in the area had been acrimonious. At a tumultuous June 1992 meeting culminating in the arrest of 15 protesters, the Gainesville City Commission voted 3-2 to oppose a proposed Alachua County anti-discrimination ordinance in a resolution equating homosexuality with "pedophilia, bestiality and necrophilia."

In March 1993, by a 3-2 vote, the Alachua County Commission passed the ordinance adding sexual orientation as a protected category on the county level. In response, a local anti-gay group called Concerned Citizens of Alachua County gathered signatures to overturn the law by referendum. Two groups, No On 1 and Just Vote No, arose to fight the referendum but were badly outspent by the Concerned Citizens group.

After a contentious months-long campaign, the Alachua County ordinance was overturned by citizen referendum in the fall elections of 1994 by a vote of 57% to 43%.

At the same election, a county charter amendment forbidding any similar anti-discrimination ordinances in the future passed with 60% of the vote. Local activists challenged the ban in state court, with national legal organizations getting involved on both sides. In November 1996, following the U.S. Supreme Court's ruling in Romer v. Evans, a judge threw out the amendment barring protection of gay people because it had no rational basis under the U.S. Constitution.

In 1998, after the makeup of the city commission changed following municipal elections, Gainesville city commissioners voted 3-1 to add sexual orientation to the city discrimination ordinance, a move which met with much less fervent opposition.

After the 2008 passage of Gainesville's ordinance protecting transgender people from discrimination, the Group Citizens for Good Public Policy organized a campaign to remove both gender identity and sexual orientation from the charter citing fears that loose gender laws would make it easier for men to infiltrate bathrooms designated for women and girls. By July 2008, they had collected enough signatures to place a referendum on the 2009 city ballot.

== Campaigns ==
Both proponents and opponents of the measure had assistance from interest groups. The PAC Citizens for Good Public Policy supported the measure with legal representation from the Thomas More Law Center, a conservative Christian law group.

Observers noted that the sides and issues involved the campaign resembled those in the 1994 vote, with one exception. The primary opposition arose from Equality is Gainesville's Business, which was represented in court by the American Civil Liberties Union and received support from Lambda Legal, the NAACP, the League of Women Voters, and other organizations.

== Political Aftermath ==
In 2010, Gainesville's mayoral race featured Don Marsh, a conservative who had vocally supported Charter Amendment One, and Craig Lowe, a city commissioner who had voted in favor of adding gender identity to the city charter.

A runoff election resulted in Craig Lowe being narrowly elected Gainesville's first openly gay mayor by a margin of 42 votes.

To express their opposition to Lowe's campaign, controversial Dove World Outreach Center displayed a sign reading "No homo Mayor" before amending the statement to read "No homo." The sign was modified after warnings that adopting a political stance could cause them to lose their tax-exempt status.
