= 1994 Idaho Proposition 1 =

- November 8, 1994

Results
| Choice | Votes | % |
|---|---|---|
| Yes | 202,681 | 49.62% |
| No | 205,754 | 50.38% |
County results
Yes
60–70%
50–60%
No
70–80%
60–70%
50–60%

Proposition 1 was a referendum in the Idaho in 1994, concerning gay rights and minority status. The purpose of Proposition 1 was to prevent homosexual people from receiving minority status in the state. The Idaho Citizens Alliance (ICA) petitioned for 2 years for enough signatures to put their initiative on the November 1994 ballot. Proposition 1 was defeated in the polls by a majority vote.

== History ==
In January 1992, Kelly Walton, leader of the newly established ICA, announced his intention to pass an initiative that would prevent any citizen of Idaho from receiving "special rights" based on their sexual orientation. Supporters of the initiative believed that homosexuality was a choice and that minority status should not be granted for a person's behavior. In order for the initiative to officially make an Idaho ballot, it required signatures. The ICA petitioned and rallied for two years until finally obtaining the required number of signatures to make the November 1994 ballot.

While the ICA petitioned, a pro-LGBT rights group Don't Sign On protested and rallied in opposition. Doing what they could to bring the issue of homosexual rights to the attention of Idaho citizens, Don't Sign On campaigned against Proposition 1 and the ICA. When Focus on the Family voiced anti-homosexual opinions, Don't Sign On and other homosexual supporters held a vigil in front of Family Forum, the Boise office for Focus on the Family. The Gay and Lesbian Freedom Day Parade drew 1,167 people to Boise and the organizers of the event credit the anti-gay initiative for the attendance boost. In August 1994, in order to bring even more attention to their cause, Don't Sign On changed their name to No On One.

== Text of measure ==
Initiative relating to homosexuality and the state's authority to afford homosexuals minority status; enacting a new chapter, chap. 80, title 67, Idaho Code: providing that no state agency, department or political subdivision shall grant minority status to persons who engage in homosexual behavior; providing that same-sex marriages and domestic partnerships shall not be legally recognized; providing that elementary and secondary school educators shall not discuss homosexuality as acceptable behavior; providing that no state funds shall be expended in a manner that has the effect of accepting or approving homosexuality; limiting to adults access to library materials which address homosexuality; providing that private sexual practices may be considered non-job factors in public employement; and providing a severability clause. Shall the above-entitled measure proposed by Proposition One be approved?
