= Constitution of Oregon =

American state constitution

Oregon Constitution
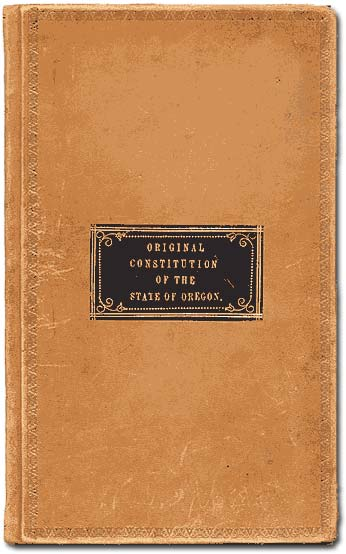
- The leather cover of the original Oregon Constitution
- Created: September 18, 1857
- Ratified: November 9, 1857 (effective on February 14, 1859)
- Location: State Archives
- Author(s): Delegates of the Oregon Constitutional Convention
- Signatories: 52 of 60 delegates

Full text
- Oregon Constitution at Wikisource

The Oregon Constitution is the governing document of the U.S. state of Oregon, originally enacted in 1857. As amended the current state constitution contains eighteen Articles, beginning with a bill of rights. This contains most of the rights and privileges protected by the United States Bill of Rights and the main text of the United States Constitution. The remainder of the Oregon Constitution outlines the divisions of power within the state government, lists the times of elections, and defines the state boundaries and the capital as Salem.

== History ==
The first constitutional documents enacted in Oregon pre-dated statehood. These were the Organic Law of 1843 and the Organic Law of 1845, adopted to govern Oregon Territory. In 1857, leaders of the territory gathered at the Oregon Constitutional Convention and drafted the current constitution. Over half of the document's content was derived in part from the Indiana constitution. The constitution of 1857 included a racial exclusion section that excluded African Americans and Chinese from the state. (See Racism in Oregon.)

On November 9, 1857, Oregon voters approved its first constitution that then became effective upon statehood on February 14, 1859. The constitution was unchanged for the remainder of the 19th century, but has been amended numerous times since 1902 (see List of Oregon ballot measures). The changes have included the introduction of a direct legislation system, which enabled Oregon voters to propose and approve amendments both to the Constitution and to the Oregon Revised Statutes.

In 1905, a coalition of Oregon lawyers advocated for convening a constitutional convention the following year, and drafted plans for the selection of delegates. According to The Oregonian, Portland attorneys were "almost to a man in favor of making the change". Dissenters included Portland attorneys George W. Joseph, who advised "leaving well enough alone", and C. E. S. Wood, who insisted that the recent passage of initiative and referendum system offered sufficient opportunity to amend the constitution as needed. Governor George Earle Chamberlain declined to take a position.

In 1916, Oregonians voted to keep Section 6 of Article II of the constitution, which read "No negro, Chinaman or mulatto shall have the right of suffrage", even though it had been rendered void by the Fifteenth Amendment to the United States Constitution. In 1927, Oregonians finally decided to remove this suffrage exclusion from their constitution.

== Differences from U.S. Constitution ==
The Oregon Constitution is easier to amend than its federal counterpart. Amending the U.S. Constitution requires a two-thirds vote in Congress and ratification by three-fourths of the states. In Oregon, once an initiative amendment to its constitution has been placed on the ballot by initiative petition, or once a legislative amendment has been referred to the people by a simple majority vote in the state legislature, a simple majority of favorable votes is enough to ratify it. Placing a petition for an amendment on the ballot requires a number of valid signatures of registered voters equal to eight percent of the total number of votes cast in the last gubernatorial election, (Note: Oregon Constitution, Art. IV §1(2)(c)) higher than the six percent required for a change in statute. (Note: Oregon Constitution, Art. IV §1(2)(b)) The Oregon Constitution can also be revised by the Oregon Legislative Assembly with a two-thirds supermajority vote in each house, which then requires a simply majority of voters to ratify. (Note: Oregon Constitution, Article XVII §1) See the list of Oregon ballot measures for initiative amendments.

=== Freedom of Speech ===
The right to free speech in Oregon is broader than the federal level:

No law shall be passed restraining the free expression of opinion, or restricting the right to speak, write, or print freely on any subject whatever; but every person shall be responsible for the abuse of this right.

— Oregon Constitution, Art. I §8

In State v. Robertson, the Oregon Supreme Court has cited this right against parts of Oregon's disorderly conduct statute, against content-based restrictions on billboards and murals, and against laws restricting the sale of pornography. (Note: For a discussion of this decision and the subsequent case law see: William R. Long (October 2003) Free Speech in Oregon: A framework under fire. In: Oregon State Bar Bulletin. Archived from the original on October 30, 2018.; American Civil Liberties Union (ACLU) Oregon (September 12, 2019): City of Nyssa v. Dufloth, State v. Ciancanelli. Archived from the original on March 30, 2019.; Charles E. Beggs (September 30, 2005): Oregon Supreme Court overturns laws on sex shows, dancers. In: The Seattle Times. Archived from the original on November 21, 2018.)

Later in 1987, the court cited this provision when it abolished the state's obscenity statute in State v. Henry.

=== Right to Bear Arms and Right to Self-Defense ===
The right to bear arms granted by the Oregon Constitution is also considered broader than federal rights granted under the Second Amendment, as Oregon's Constitution specifically states the right to bear arms is not only for militia purposes, but also includes the right for individual self-defense:

The people shall have the right to bear arms for the defence [sic] of themselves, and the State, but the Military shall be kept in strict subordination to the civil power.

— Oregon Constitution, Art. I §27

In State v. Kessler (1980), the Oregon Supreme Court struck down a state law making the mere possession of a billy club a criminal act as being unconstitutional under Article I, section 27.

In State v. Delgado (1984), the Oregon Supreme Court struck down a state ban on switchblade knives as being unconstitutional under Article I, section 27.

In City of Portland v. Lodi (1989), the Oregon Supreme Court struck down a Portland city ordinance that prohibited carrying concealed knives with blades longer than 3.5 inches as being unconstitutional under Article I, section 27.

In State v. Turner (2008), the Oregon Court of Appeals established the key legal standard for what constitutes carrying a concealed weapon. While the court upheld the charges of unlawful possession of a concealed weapon against the defendant in this case, it also addressed police stops clarifying that an officer must have reasonable suspicion to stop someone, further clarifying that the mere lawful carrying a visible weapon in-and-of-itself is not grounds to stop someone, as they are exercising their rights under Article I, Section 27.

In Oregon v. Christian (2013), the Oregon Supreme Court affirmed the constitutionality of a Portland ordinance that prohibited the possession of certain weapons, including knives, in public places like government buildings and courthouses. However, the court also reaffirmed the ruling in State v. Delgado that the general carrying of a switchblade knife is a fundamental right under Article I, Section 27.

In Arnold v. Kotek (2025), the Oregon Court of Appeals upheld Measure 114's ban on magazines with a capacity larger than 10 rounds, and upheld the requirement for a permit to purchase a firearm as being constitutional. Although the appellate court did acknowledge that a magazine is an integral part of a firearm and therefore enjoys constitutional protection, and that further efforts to restrict their use would likely constitute a violation of Article I, Section 27. The court also held that anything other than a "shall issue" policy for firearm permits would violate Article I, Section 27. The case it set to be heard by the Oregon Supreme Court, oral arguments were scheduled for November 6, 2025 and a ruling is expected by the end of the year.

== Text ==
=== Preamble ===
PREAMBLE

We the people of the State of Oregon to the end that Justice be established, order maintained, and liberty perpetuated, do ordain this Constitution.—

=== Articles ===
- I — Bill of rights
- II — Suffrage and elections (see also Elections in Oregon)
- III — Distribution of powers
- IV — Legislative department (see also Oregon Legislative Assembly)
- V — Executive department (see also List of Oregon state agencies)
- VI — Administrative department
- VII (Amended) — Judicial department (see also Oregon Judicial Department)
- VII (Original) — Judicial department
- VIII — Education and school lands (see also Education in Oregon)
- IX — Finance
- X — The militia (see also Oregon Military Department)
- XI — Corporations and internal improvements
- XI-A — Farm and home loans to veterans
- XI-D — State power development
- XI-E — State reforestation
- XI-F(1) — Higher education building projects
- XI-F(2) — Veterans' bonus
- XI-G — Higher education institutions and activities; community colleges
- XI-H — Pollution control
- XI-I(1) — Water development projects
- XI-I(2) — Multifamily housing for elderly and disabled
- XI-J — Small scale local energy loans
- XI-K — Guarantee of bonded indebtedness of education districts
- XI-L — Oregon Health and Science University (see also Oregon Health & Science University)
- XI-M — Seismic rehabilitation of public education buildings
- XI-N — Seismic rehabilitation of emergency services buildings
- XI-O — Pension liabilities
- XII — State printing
- XIV — Seat of government (see also Oregon State Capitol)
- XV — Miscellaneous
- XVI — Boundaries (see also Geography of Oregon)
- XVII — Amendments and revisions
- XVIII — Schedule
