= Timeline of civil marriage in the United States =

Many laws in the history of the United States have addressed marriage and the rights of married people. Common themes addressed by these laws include polygamy, interracial marriage, divorce, and same-sex marriage.

== 1800–1899 ==
- 1830 – Married women are granted the right to own property in their own name, instead of being owned exclusively by the husband, in Mississippi.
- 1848 – Married women are granted the right to own property in their own name in New York.
- 1856 – The platform of the Republican Party refers to polygamy as one of the "twin relics of barbarism" (alongside slavery). At the time, polygamy was a practice of The Church of Jesus Christ of Latter-day Saints (LDS Church). (See Mormonism and polygamy.)
- 1862 – The Morrill Anti-Bigamy Act makes bigamy in the territories a felony punishable by a $500 fine or five years in prison.
- 1873 – In Bradwell v. Illinois the Supreme Court rules that a state has the right to exclude a married woman from practicing law.
- 1874 – The Poland Act transfers jurisdiction over Morrill Anti-Bigamy Act cases to federal prosecutors and courts in Utah and removes Latter-day Saints from positions of authority in the Utah justice system. The Act was intended to allow for successful prosecutions of polygamists.
- 1879 – The Morrill Anti-Bigamy Act is upheld by the U.S. Supreme Court in the case of Reynolds v. United States.
- 1882 – The Edmunds Act makes bigamous cohabitation a misdemeanor, which does not require proof of a second marriage. It allows polygamists to be held indefinitely without a trial.
- 1887 – The Edmunds-Tucker Act allows prosecutors to force polygamist wives to testify against their husbands and abolishes the right of women to vote in Utah.
- 1890 – LDS Church president Wilford Woodruff issues the 1890 Manifesto, which disavows the practice of polygamy where it violates the civil law.

== 1900–1999 ==
- 1900 – All states now grant married women the right to own property in their own name.
- 1904 – LDS Church President Joseph F. Smith issues the 1904 "Second Manifesto", which stated that the church was no longer sanctioning plural (polygamous) marriages and would excommunicate anyone who participates in future polygamy.
- 1907 – Under the Expatriation Act of 1907, American women will lose citizenship when they marry a foreign husband.
- 1913 – The federal government formally recognizes marriage in law for the first time with the passage of the Revenue Act of 1913.
- 1929 – All states now have laws regarding marriage licenses.
- 1933 – Married women granted right to citizenship independent of their husbands.
- 1948 – California Supreme Court overturns interracial marriage ban (Perez v. Sharp).
- 1965 – The Supreme Court overturns laws prohibiting married couples from using contraception (Griswold v. Connecticut).
- 1967 – The Supreme Court overturns laws prohibiting interracial couples from marrying (Loving v. Virginia).
- 1969 – The first no-fault divorce law, signed by Governor Ronald Reagan, is adopted in California.
- 1971 – The Supreme Court refuses to hear challenge to a Minnesota Supreme Court ruling allowing prohibition of same-sex marriage (Baker v. Nelson).
- 1972 – The Supreme Court upholds an Alabama law which automatically changes a woman's legal surname to that of her husband upon marriage (Forbush v. Wallace).
- 1972 – The Supreme Court overturns laws prohibiting unmarried couples from purchasing contraception (Eisenstadt v. Baird).
- 1973 – Maryland becomes the first state in the U.S. to define marriage as "between a man and a woman" in statute.
- 1975 – Married women allowed to have credit in their own name.
- 1975 – Three states outlaw same-sex marriage by statutes.
- 1976 – The Supreme Court overturns laws prohibiting abortions for married women without the consent of the husband.
- 1993 – All 50 states have revised laws to include marital rape.
- 1996 – President Bill Clinton signs the Defense of Marriage Act into law, which outlaws federal recognition of both same-sex marriage and polygamy, and removes any requirement that states recognize such marriages entered into in other jurisdictions.
- 1998 – Hawaii amends its constitution to allow the legislature to ban same-sex marriage, in response to a court ruling which would otherwise have allowed such marriages. Alaska becomes the first state to ban both same-sex marriage and polygamy in its constitution.
- 1998 – South Carolina is the penultimate state in the U.S. to remove the ban on interracial marriage in its state constitution.

== 2000–present ==
- 2000 – Nebraska amends its state constitution to outlaw same-sex marriage and polygamy.
- 2000 – Alabama becomes the last state in the US to remove the ban on interracial marriage in its state constitution.
- 2002 – Nevada amends its state constitution to outlaw same-sex marriage and polygamy.
- 2004 – Massachusetts grants and recognizes same-sex marriages, while 14 states rush to outlaw same-sex marriage and polygamy through their state constitutions in response.
- 2005 – Texas amends its state constitution to outlaw same-sex marriage and polygamy.
- 2006 – 26 states outlaw same-sex marriage and polygamy through their state constitutions. Arizona becomes the first state in the United States to reject a constitutional amendment banning both same-sex marriage and polygamy, but passes a constitutional amendment two years later.
- 2006 – 8th Circuit Court of Appeals upholds Nebraska's ban on gay marriage.
- 2008 – New York starts recognizing same-sex marriages performed in other jurisdictions, but does not grant such marriages. Connecticut begins granting and recognizing same-sex marriages. California briefly granting and recognizing same-sex marriage until the passage of Proposition 8 later in the year (as well as both the states of Arizona and Florida in banning same-sex marriage and polygamy on the same day in their state constitutions). In California only (prior to Proposition 8) continues recognizing same-sex marriages entered into prior to the proposition's passage. 29 states outlaw same-sex marriage and polygamy through their state constitutions.
- 2009 – Iowa and Vermont grant and recognize same-sex marriages; the District of Columbia starts recognizing same-sex marriages performed in other jurisdictions, but does not grant such marriages. Maine repeals the legalization of same-sex marriage before coming into effect by popular vote, which was overturned three years later by another popular vote.
- 2010 – New Hampshire and the District of Columbia begins granting and recognizing same-sex marriages. Maryland starts recognizing same-sex marriages performed in other jurisdictions, but does not grant such marriages. In Perry v. Schwarzenegger, a district court overturns California's ban on same-sex marriage (however, the decision is stayed pending an appeal).
- 2011 – New York begins granting and recognizing same-sex marriages.
- 2012 – A federal appeals court upholds the district court decision that struck down California's ban on same-sex marriage (the case was appealed to the U.S. Supreme Court).
- 2012 – North Carolina amends its state constitution by a vote to outlaw both same-sex marriage and polygamy, bringing the total to 30 states that have outlawed both same-sex marriage and polygamy through their state constitutions. Rhode Island starts recognizing same-sex marriages performed in other jurisdictions, but does not grant such marriages.
- 2012 – Both Washington and Maine begins granting and recognizing same-sex marriages, only after approval from a referendum, while Minnesota rejects a constitutional amendment banning both same-sex marriage and polygamy.
- 2013 – Maryland begins granting and recognizing same-sex marriages, only after approval from a referendum.
- 2013 - Legal same-sex marriage begins in Delaware and Minnesota.
- 2013 - The Supreme Court of the United States finds that there is no standing for the appeal of the decision overturning Proposition 8 in California, leading to re-introduction of legal same-sex marriages in that state.
- 2013 - The Supreme Court of the United States overturns the Defense of Marriage Act, which outlaws federal recognition of both same-sex marriage and polygamy. Requiring that the federal government recognize marriages in states where such unions are legal.
- 2013 - US District court finds in Brown v. Buhman that portions of Utah's ban on multiple cohabitation were unconstitutional but allowed Utah to maintain its ban on multiple marriage licenses.
- 2013 - The U.S. District Court for the District of Utah strikes down Utah's ban on same-sex marriage. The ruling was not stayed for several weeks allowing nearly a thousand same-sex couples to marry, though the ruling was stayed by the U.S. Supreme Court on January 6, 2014.
- January 2014 - On January 14, The U.S. District Court for the Northern District of Oklahoma struck down Oklahoma's ban on same-sex marriage and stayed the ruling pending appeal. Oklahoma announced its intent to appeal to the Tenth Circuit Court of Appeals.
- February 2014 - On February 12, U.S. District Court struck down Kentucky's ban on recognize same-sex marriages performed in other jurisdictions. The order was stayed pending appeal on March 20 and never took effect. On February 13, the U.S. District Court for the Eastern District of Virginia struck down Virginia's ban on same-sex marriage and stayed the ruling pending appeal. On February 26, a U.S. District Court struck down Texas's ban on same-sex marriage and stayed the ruling pending appeal.
- March 2014 - On March 4, several Illinois counties began issuing marriage licenses to same-sex couple after an opinion issued by the state attorney general. This was ahead of a law scheduled to take effect statewide on June 1. On March 21, the U.S. District Court for the Eastern District of Michigan struck down Michigan's ban on same-sex marriage. The ruling took effect immediately and over 300 same-sex couples obtained marriage licenses before the ruling was stayed pending appeal by the Sixth Circuit.
- May 2014 - On May 9, a Pulaski County Circuit Judge in Arkansas struck down the state's ban on same-sex marriage. Nearly 500 couples obtained marriage licenses before the ruling was stayed on May 16 by the Arkansas Supreme Court. On May 14, the U.S. District Court for the District of Idaho struck down the state's same-sex marriage ban and ordered the state to start recognizing same-sex marriages performed in other jurisdictions as well as license them. The ruling was stayed pending appeal before it took effect. On May 19, the U.S. District Court of Oregon struck down the state's ban on same-sex marriage and ordered marriages to begin immediately. The state agreed with the ruling and refused to appeal, legalizing same-sex marriage in Oregon. On May 20, the U.S. District Court for the Middle District of Pennsylvania struck down Pennsylvania's statutory ban on same-sex marriage. Like Oregon, the judge ordered marriages to begin immediately. The state refused to appeal the decision, legalizing same-sex marriage in Pennsylvania.
- June, 2015 - On June 26, the Supreme Court ruled in Obergefell v. Hodges that the Fourteenth Amendment to the constitution requires a State to license a marriage between two people of the same sex and to recognize a marriage between two people of the same sex when their marriage was lawfully licensed and performed out-of-state, legalizing same-sex marriage in the United States.
- April 2016—The Tenth Circuit overturns the District Court's ruling on Brown v. Buhman declaring that Brown lacks standing to sue.
- 2022 – Congress passes and President Joe Biden signs the Respect for Marriage Act which requires the U.S. federal government and all U.S. states and territories (though not tribes) to recognize the validity of same-sex and interracial civil marriages in the United States.

== See also ==
- Marriage in the United States
- Polygamy in the United States
- List of benefits of marriage in the United States
- Domestic partnerships in the United States
- Timeline of same-sex marriage in the United States
- Same-sex marriage in the United States
  - Same-sex marriage legislation in the United States
  - Same-sex marriage legislation in the United States by state
  - Same-sex marriage in the United States public opinion
  - Same-sex marriage status in the United States by state
  - Defense of Marriage Act
  - Marriage Protection Act
  - U.S. state constitutional amendments banning same-sex unions
  - Federal Marriage Amendment
  - Respect for Marriage Act
