= Domestic partnership in Washington =

Domestic partnership in Washington may refer to:

- Domestic partnership in Washington (state)
- Domestic partnership in Washington, D.C.
