= Washington Families Standing Together =

Political group in Washington state

- U.S. State of Washington
- Formation: 2009
- Headquarters: Seattle, Washington

Washington Families Standing Together (WAFST) was founded in 2009 to preserve domestic partnerships in Washington State by urging voters to approve Referendum 71.

When Protect Marriage Washington, a group that opposes extending any benefits to same-sex couples, filed a petition to prevent Senate Bill 5688 (as passed by the Washington State Legislature and signed by Governor Christine Gregoire) from going into effect, WAFST sued Secretary of State Sam Reed in an attempt to keep the issue off the ballot. They argued that the Secretary's office had accepted signatures provided by people who were not registered to vote or gathered by people who did not sign their signature sheets, and that the petitions were thus invalid. However, the court declined to block the referendum, which appeared on the 2009 ballot. During the campaign, WAFST also pointed out the benefits of the domestic partnership law to elderly couples - it would have extended benefits to "unmarried heterosexual couples where one partner is at least 62." The referendum was approved, and domestic partnerships went into effect.

== See also ==
- LGBT rights in the United States
- List of LGBT rights organizations
- Washington United for Marriage
