= 2009 in LGBTQ rights =

This is a list of notable events in the history of LGBTQ rights that took place in the year 2009.

== Events ==
=== January ===
- 1 – Same-sex marriage begins in Norway.

=== February ===
- 1 – Jóhanna Sigurðardóttir becomes prime minister of Iceland, the first openly gay head of government in the modern world.
- 9 – Domestic Partnership Registry opens in Phoenix, Arizona.
- 12
  - In the United States Congress, Representative Jerrold Nadler of New York and Senator Patrick Leahy of Vermont reintroduce the Uniting American Families Act (UAFA) (H.R.1024 & S.424).
  - The government of Hungary approves a new registered partnership bill which would only apply to same-sex couples, providing all of the rights of marriage except adoption and the ability to take the same surname. Registered partnership legislation was previously passed by the government in 2007, but struck down as unconstitutional 16 days before taking effect since its availability to opposite-sex couples duplicated already-existing marriage law.
  - Hawaii civil unions bill passes the state house on a 33–17 vote.
- 18 – All five bills called the Common Ground Initiative that would have extended LGBT rights in Utah die.
- 19 – The North Dakota Senate votes 27 to 19 to amend the state Human Rights Act to include sexual orientation and gender identity.
- 20 – A bill to criminalize homosexuality dies in the Burundi Senate.
- 23 – The Colorado House approves a domestic partner benefits bill that would make it easier for unmarried couples, including gays and lesbians, to make medical decision for incapacitated partners and leave property to their partners.
- 24 – The Colorado Senate approves a domestic partner benefits bill that would make it easier for unmarried couples, including gays and lesbians, to make medical decision for incapacitated partners and leave property to their partners.

=== March ===
- 2 – Argentina ends ban on gays in the military.
- 3 – The Philippines ends ban on gays in the military.
- 5 – The California Supreme Court meets in San Francisco to hear arguments concerning the validity of Proposition 8.
- 10
  - in Tel Aviv, Uzi Even and his life partner become the first same-sex male couple in Israel whose right of adoption is legally acknowledged.
  - In the case of HJ and HT v Home Secretary, the Court of Appeal of England and Wales denies the asylum claims of two men, from Iran and Cameroon, stating that the men would not be subject to persecution for their sexual orientation if they concealed it (the so-called "discretion test").
- 20 – Denmark legalizes adoption by same-sex couples.
- 23 – The Vermont Senate passes a bill 26 to 4 legalizing same sex marriage.
- 26 – Serbian lawmakers give final approval with a majority of 127 votes in favor to 59 against to ban any kind of discrimination, whether based on race, religion, sexual orientation or gender or other factors.
- 26 – The New Hampshire House votes for gay marriage 186 to 179 after first voting against it, 183 to 182.
- 27 – Japan allows its citizens to marry same-sex foreign partners in countries where same-sex marriage is legal.

=== April ===
- 1 – Sweden legalizes same-sex marriage effective May 1.
- 3 – The Iowa Supreme Court rules that the state must offer same-sex marriage.
- 7 – Vermont legalizes same-sex marriage effective September 1.
- 9 – Colorado Governor Bill Ritter (D) signs a domestic partner benefits bill effective July 1.
- 16 – Washington Governor Chris Gregoire signs the "everything but marriage" domestic partnership bill effective June 1.
- 20 – Hungary's Registered Partnership Bill 2009 passes the National Assembly of Hungary effective July 1.
- 22 - Burundi passes a law effectively criminalizing same-sex acts and with a penalty of three months to two years imprisonment with fines.
- 30 – Iowa officials start issuing marriage licences to same-sex couples.

=== May ===
- 1 – Sweden's gender-neutral marriage law becomes effective.
- 3 – The Obama administration allows the deadline to appeal Witt v. Department of the Air Force to pass, leaving Witt as binding precedent for the United States Court of Appeals for the Ninth Circuit.
- 5 – New Hampshire passes the same-sex marriage bill by a Senate vote of 13–11 and a House vote of 186–179.
- 8 – Maine Governor John Baldacci signs the End Discrimination in Civil Marriage and Affirm Religious Freedom Act 2009 into law which legalizes same-sex marriage effective September 14, 2009.
- 12 – New York marriage bill passes the Assembly vote by a vote of 89–52.
- 15 – Uruguay allows gay people to serve openly in the military.
- 15 – Finland allows same-sex couples the legal right to adopt a biological child.
- 19 – Washington Governor Chris Gregoire signs the "everything-but-marriage" domestic partnership bill into law.
- 20 – The Nevada legislature passes the Domestic Partnership Responsibilities Act 2009 but Governor Jim Gibbon vetoes the bill a week later.
- 21 – Colorado Governor Bill Ritter signs a bill that provides health insurance and a few more entitlements for state workers that includes unmarried mixed- and same-sex couples.
- 26 – The California Supreme Court issues its ruling in Strauss v. Horton. The court upholds Proposition 8 by a 6–1 vote but the marriages performed before the measure took effect remain legal and valid.

=== June ===
- 1 – The Nevada legislature overrides Governor Jim Gibbons's veto; the state will provide domestic partnership effective October 1.
- 3
  - The Canadian province of Alberta is the last province to include the words "sexual orientation" in the Human Rights Act.
  - New Hampshire legalizes civil marriage for same-sex couples effective January 1, 2010.
  - The United States Senate Committee on the Judiciary holds the first hearing ever on the Uniting American Families Act.
- 30 – Wisconsin Governor Jim Doyle signs the Budget Considerations And Limited Domestic Partnership Act 2009 into law. The law enumerates 43 rights for registered same-sex couples.

=== July ===
- 1 – Colorado domestic partnership law becomes effective.
- 2 – The Delhi High Court rules that homosexual intercourse between consenting adults is not a criminal act.
- 3 – Delaware prohibits sexual orientation discrimination under the Delaware Code, but not gender identity.
- 6 – The District of Columbia recognizes same-sex marriages performed in other jurisdictions.

=== August ===
- 3 – Wisconsin domestic partnership law becomes effective.

=== September ===
- 1 – Vermont same-sex marriage law becomes effective.

=== October ===
- 1 – Nevada domestic partnership becomes effective.
- 13 – Ugandan Member of Parliament David Bahati introduces the Uganda Anti-Homosexuality Bill which would broaden the criminalization of same-sex relationships in Uganda and establish the death penalty for HIV-positive people engaging in sexual activity with people of the same sex or with those under 18.
- 28 – United States President Barack Obama signs the Matthew Shepard Act, which expands federal hate-crime law to include crimes motivated by a victim's actual or perceived gender, sexual orientation, gender identity, or disability, the first US federal law to extend legal protections to transgender persons.

=== November ===
- India agrees to list eunuchs and transgender people as "others", distinct from males and females, in voting rolls and voter identity cards.
- 3
  - Washington voters approve Referendum 71 to uphold the state's "everything but marriage" domestic partnership law with 53% of the vote.
  - Maine voters repeal the state's marriage equality law by 53%.
- 12 – India election authorities begin granting intersex and transsexual people the right to register as independent genders on voting lists.
- 13 – A judge in Buenos Aires, Argentina, allows for the first same-sex marriage in Argentina and Latin America.
- 14 – The mayor of Montpellier, France, Hélène Mandroux, launches the Appeal of Montpellier in support of same sex marriage in France.
- 19 – The New York Court of Appeals rules that state officials have the authority to recognize out-of-state same-sex marriages, although the court declines to rule on whether same-sex couples may legally marry in the state.

=== December ===
- The Supreme Court of Pakistan orders a census of hijras, who number between 80,000 and 300,000 in Pakistan.
- 1 – LGBT rights in Europe, The Treaty of Lisbon come together with the Charter of Fundamental Rights of the European Union into effect. In article 21 of the Charter sexual orientation is protected.
- 18 – Washington, D.C. mayor Adrian Fenty signs the city's same-sex marriage bill into law.
- 21 – The Legislative Assembly of the Federal District passes a bill allowing same-sex marriage and adoption 39-20.
- 23 – Iftikhar Muhammad Chaudhry, the Chief Justice of Pakistan, orders that the National Database and Registration Authority issue national identity cards to members of the community showing their "distinct" gender. Chaudhry asked the government to ensure that hijras can inherit property and to be sure they are not harassed. The court suggested that the federal government employ hijras in the recovery of loans from defaulters.
- 29 – Mexico City's same-sex marriage bill is signed into law by Head of Government ("Mayor") Marcelo Ebrard. It will go into effect in 45 working days.

== Deaths ==
- April 12 – Eve Kosofsky Sedgwick, 58, American theorist specializing in queer studies and LGBT rights activist.
- July 22 – Mark Leduc, 47, Canadian Olympic boxer and Toronto People with AIDS Foundation campaigner.

== See also ==
- Timeline of LGBTQ history — timeline of events from 12,000 BCE to present
- LGBTQ rights by country or territory — current legal status around the world
- LGBTQ social movements
