= Same-sex unions in the United States =

Same-sex unions in the United States are available in various forms in all states and territories, except American Samoa. All states have legal same-sex marriage, while others have the options of civil unions, domestic partnerships, or reciprocal beneficiary relationships. The federal government only recognizes marriage and no other legal union for same-sex couples.

Hawaii was the first state to recognize limited legal same-sex unions, doing so in 1997 in the form of reciprocal beneficiary relationships.

== Federal law ==
The legal issues surrounding same-sex marriage in the United States are complicated by the nation's federal system of government. Traditionally, the federal government does not attempt to establish its own definition of marriage. Instead, any marriage recognized by a state was recognized by the federal government, even if that marriage was not recognized by one or more other states (as was the case with interracial marriage before 1967 due to anti-miscegenation laws). According to the federal Government Accountability Office (GAO), more than 1,138 rights and protections are conferred to U.S. citizens upon marriage by the federal government; areas affected include Social Security benefits, veterans' benefits, health insurance, Medicaid, hospital visitation, estate taxes, retirement savings, pensions, family leave, and immigration law.

The federal Defense of Marriage Act in 1996, prompted by fears of an adverse result in Hawaii's lawsuit Baehr v. Miike, defined a marriage explicitly as a union of one man and one woman for the purposes of all federal laws (See 1 U.S.C. § 7), which was ultimately ruled unconstitutional by the Supreme Court in United States v. Windsor on June 26, 2013. As a result, shortly after Windsor was decided, a number of federal areas ranging from veteran benefits to immigration were clarified as applying equally to same-sex couples.

== Marriage ==
The movement to obtain civil marriage rights and benefits for same-sex couples in the United States began in the 1970s but remained unsuccessful for over forty years. On May 17, 2004, Massachusetts became the first U.S. state and the sixth jurisdiction in the world to legalize same-sex marriage following the Supreme Judicial Court's decision six months earlier. Before nationwide legalization same-sex marriage became legal in 37 states; 25 states by court order, 10 by legislative action, and 3 by referendum. Some states had legalized same-sex marriage by more than one of the three actions.

On June 26, 2015, the Supreme Court of the United States ruled in Obergefell v. Hodges that states must license and recognize same-sex marriages. Consequently, same-sex marriage is legal in all 50 states, the District of Columbia, Puerto Rico, Guam, U.S. Virgin Islands and Northern Mariana Islands. Officials in American Samoa are discussing whether the ruling applies to the territory; currently same-sex marriages are neither licensed nor recognized there.

=== Native American Tribal Nations ===
The Supreme Court decision legalizing same-sex marriage in the states and territories did not legalize same-sex marriage on Native American lands. In the United States, Congress (not the federal courts) have legal authority over Indian country. Thus, unless Congress passes a law imposing same-sex marriage on Native American tribes, federally recognized Native American tribes have the legal right to form their own marriage laws. As of the time of the Obergefell ruling, 24 tribal nations legally recognize same-sex marriage. Some tribes have passed legislation specifically addressing same-sex relationships and some specify that state law and jurisdiction govern tribal marriages.

== Civil unions ==
State laws regarding same-sex unions similar to marriage in the United States^{1} Domestic partnerships or civil unions granting state privileges of marriage^{2} Domestic partnerships granting limited/enumerated privileges No same-sex unions similar to marriage Same-sex unions similar to marriage banned Same-sex and opposite-sex unions similar to marriage banned^{1}Not recognized by the federal government. However, same-sex marriage is legal nationwide (excluding some territories and Native American tribal jurisdictions) and is recognized by the federal government. Same-sex unions similar to marriage are provided at the local level in many jurisdictions.^{2}Domestic partnerships in Washington are only available when at least one of the partners is 62 years of age or older.

Laws regarding same-sex partnerships similar to marriage by state, county, and local level in the United States^{1} Same-sex unions similar to marriage^{2} Domestic partnership granting limited/enumerated privileges State grants benefits to state employees Same-sex unions not provided^{1}Not recognized by the federal government. However, same-sex marriage is legal nationwide (excluding American Samoa and some Native American tribal jurisdictions) and is recognized by the federal government.^{2}Domestic partnerships in Washington are only available when at least one of the partners is 62 years of age or older.

Civil unions are a means of establishing kinship in a manner similar to that of marriage. The formalities for entering a civil union and the benefits and responsibilities of the parties tend to be similar or identical to those relating to marriage. Various names are used for similar relationships in other countries, but civil union was first applied in Vermont.

In 2013, with the Supreme Court's invalidation of Section 3 of the Defense of Marriage Act, same-sex marriage began to provide federal benefits. Civil unions continue not to provide federal benefits.

After same-sex marriage became legal in Vermont, Connecticut, New Hampshire, Rhode Island, and Delaware, those states ceased to offer civil unions.

As of 2024, civil unions are still offered in Hawaii, Illinois, New Jersey, and Colorado; as well as in several Arizona towns.

== Domestic partnerships ==
Domestic partnerships are any of a variety of relationships recognized by employers or state or local government. The benefits of domestic relationships range from very limited rights to all the rights afforded to married people by the state, except where federal law makes providing benefits impossible. While most domestic partnership schemes grant those partners limited, enumerated rights, the Oregon, Washington, and Nevada schemes provide substantially the same rights as marriage and are therefore, essentially, civil unions. In 2014, Oregon began offering marriage to same-sex couples too.

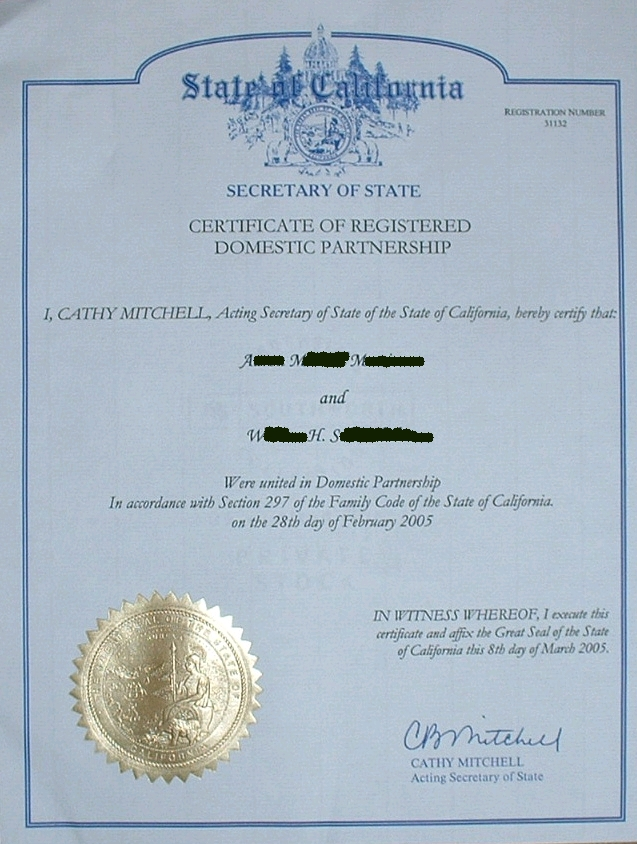
Example of California domestic partnership certificate.

Cities, boroughs, towns, townships, unincorporated areas, and villages that offers domestic partner benefits Counties, consolidated city-counties, boroughs, parishes, and independent cities that offers domestic partner benefits State-wide partner benefits through same-sex marriage, civil unions, domestic partnership, designated beneficiary agreements, or reciprocal beneficiary relationships State-wide partner benefits through same-sex marriage, civil unions, domestic partnership, designated beneficiary agreements, or reciprocal beneficiary relationships, including state-wide domestic partnership benefits for state employees^{1}

Some U.S. cities, including New York, San Francisco, and Toledo, offer domestic partnership registries. These registries afford registered partner specified rights otherwise reserved to married couples. The rights afforded include access to city services and rights created by city ordinances. Some private employers within such cities use the domestic partnership registries for the purpose of determining employee eligibility for domestic partner benefits.

Six U.S. states and the District of Columbia have some form of domestic partnership. One of these, Hawaii, calls its scheme a "reciprocal beneficiary" registry. Domestic partnership benefits vary widely, ranging from enumerated lists of benefits similar to municipal domestic partnerships to benefits equal to marriage.

When state governments legalize same-sex unions in some form, municipalities and counties in these states may sometimes choose to sunset their own domestic partnership registries (as Cook County, Illinois did in May 2011), while others which enacted such local registries prior to the state's own registry may retain their registries for various reasons. Such registries continue to be separate from state-level registries and unions, and usually must be filed after the dissolution of a state-level union. Those states include California, Colorado, Hawaii, Maine, Maryland, Nevada, New Jersey, and Washington.

== Employment benefits ==
Some public- and private-sector U.S. employers provide health insurance or other spousal benefits to same-sex partners of employees, although the employee receiving benefits for his or her partner may have to pay income tax on the value of the benefit.

Partner benefits are more common among large employers, colleges and universities than at small businesses. The qualifications for and benefits of domestic partnership status vary from employer to employer; some recognize only same-sex or different-sex couples, while others recognize both.

According to data from the Human Rights Campaign Foundation, the majority of Fortune 500 companies provided benefits to same-sex partners of employees as of June 2006. Overall, 41 percent of HR professionals indicate that their organizations offered some form of domestic partner benefits (opposite-sex partners, same-sex partners or both).

Because the U.S. federal government does not recognize same- or opposite-sex partners, tax benefits provided to opposite-sex spouses are generally not available to same-sex partners and spouses or opposite-sex partners. While there are certain exceptions, generally under the Internal Revenue Code Section 152, the imputed value of the benefit will be considered taxable income. The proposed Tax Equity for Domestic Partner and Health Plan Beneficiaries Act would remove the disparity in tax treatment between such partners and married people, who are not taxed on benefits.

== See also ==
- Civil union in the United States
- Domestic partnership in the United States
- Same-sex marriage in the United States
- LGBT rights in the United States
