= Washington United for Marriage =

Political coalition in Washington state

- The Washington United for Marriage campaign logo

- U.S. State of Washington
- Formation: 2011
- Type: Nonprofit
- Headquarters: Seattle, Washington

Washington United for Marriage was a coalition of secular and religious organizations in Washington State involved in lobbying the State Legislature to provide marriage for same-sex couples. The organization was founded in 2011, and formed to secure passage of a bill in the Washington legislature calling for same-sex marriage, and to then defend such a measure should a statewide referendum be launched to challenge it. Members of the coalition include Equal Rights Washington, the Human Rights Campaign, and the American Civil Liberties Union. Within 24 hours of having been publicly launched, the coalition had secured an endorsement for same-sex marriage in Washington from the editorial board of the Seattle Times.

== History ==
The 2009 public decision to allow domestic partnerships for same-sex couples through the approval of Referendum 71 made Washington the first state in the United States to approve any form of relationship recognition for same-sex couples at a public vote. Led by a coalition of organizations known as Washington Families Standing Together (WAFST), the campaign to approve the referendum was built around the notion that secular organizations needed to ally with progressive religious organizations in order to leverage their organizing power, and credibility within communities of faith, where much opposition to LGBT equality finds root.

Following on the approval of Referendum 71, LGBT organizations in Washington began to build the support and infrastructure to launch a full campaign in favor of same-sex marriage. Through public education work, organizations like Equal Rights Washington took advantage of growing support across the United States to begin to build local support to enact laws protecting lesbian and gay couples and their families from marriage discrimination. At the time of the founding of Washington United for Marriage, one poll showed 55% of Washington voters would support a law bestowing marriage rights on same-sex couples in Washington.

Washington United for Marriage, led by many of the same individuals involved in the Approve Referendum 71 campaign run by WAFST, was founded on a similar model of secular and religious coalition building. In addition, national heavy-hitters in the area of LGBT advocacy including the Human Rights Campaign and American Civil Liberties Union were to become even more central players in the campaign to secure votes in the Washington State Senate to pass a measure granting same-sex couples marriage rights.

== See also ==
- Same-sex marriage in Washington state
- LGBT rights in Washington (state)
- Domestic partnership in Washington state
