= 2012 Washington Referendum 74 =

Referendum Measure No. 74
- November 6, 2012
- Same-Sex Marriage

Results
Choice	Votes	%
Yes	1,659,915	53.70%
No	1,431,285	46.30%
Valid votes	3,091,200	97.42%
Invalid or blank votes	81,730	2.58%
Total votes	3,172,930	100.00%
Registered voters/turnout	3,905,140	81.25%

Approve
90–100%
80–90%
70–80%
60–70%
50–60%
Reject
90–100%
80–90%
70–80%
60–70%
50–60%
Other
Tie
No data

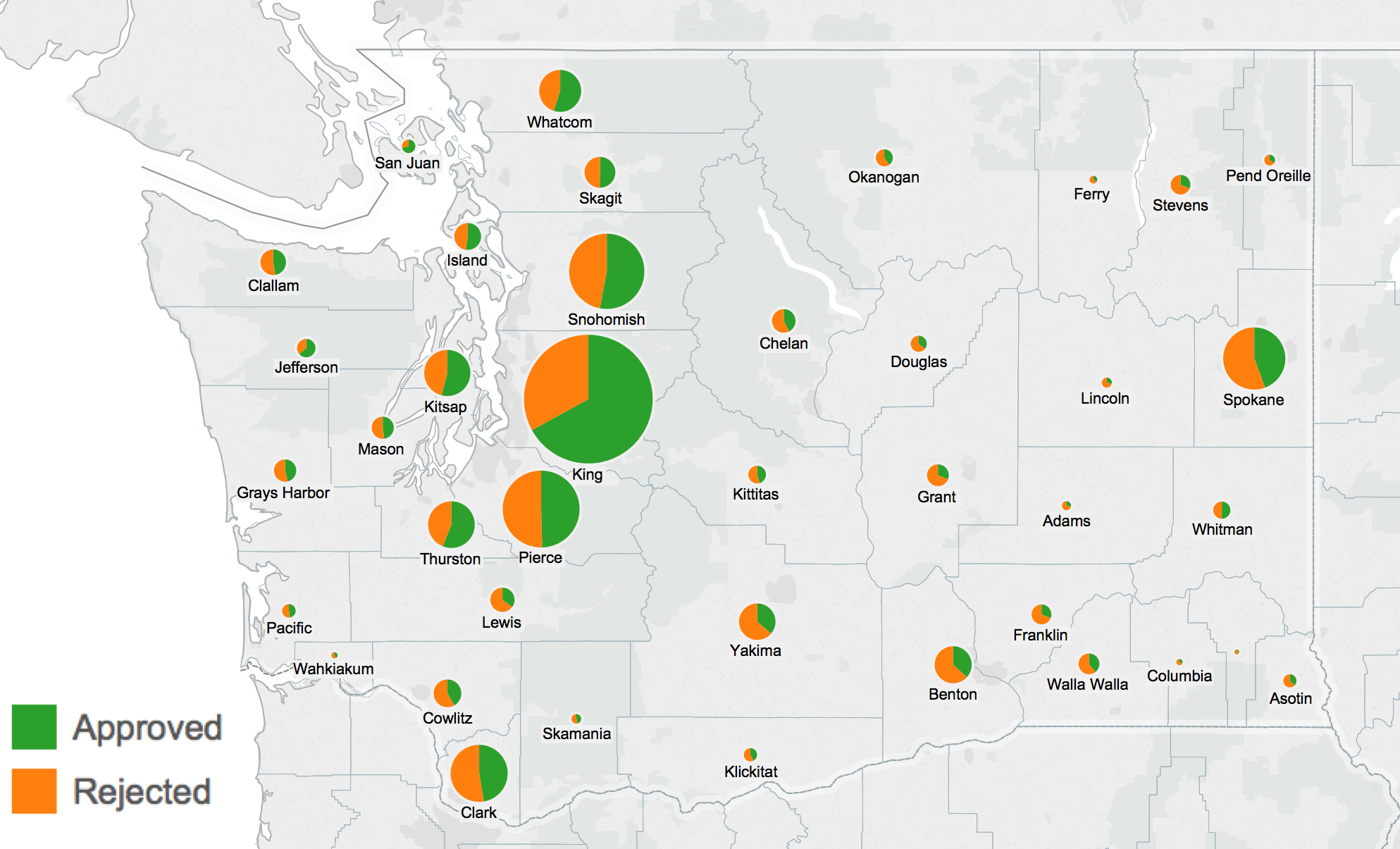
Results by county. Size shows total votes cast, Approved is green, Rejected is orange

Referendum 74 (R-74 or Ref 74) was a Washington state referendum to approve or reject the February 2012 bill that would legalize same-sex marriage in the state. On June 12, 2012, state officials announced that enough signatures in favor of the referendum had been submitted and scheduled the referendum to appear on the ballot in the November 6 general election. The law was upheld by voters in the November 6, 2012 election by a final margin of 7.4% (53.7% approve, 46.3% reject) and the result was certified on December 5.

== Ballot measure ==
The ballot title read as follows:

The legislature passed Engrossed Substitute Senate Bill 6239 concerning marriage for same-sex couples, modified domestic-partnership law, and religious freedom, and voters have filed a sufficient referendum petition on this bill.

This bill would allow same-sex couples to marry, preserve domestic partnerships only for seniors, and preserve the right of clergy or religious organizations to refuse to perform, recognize, or accommodate any marriage ceremony.

Should this bill be:

Approved [ ]

Rejected [ ]

The following summary accompanied the ballot measure:

This bill allows same-sex couples to marry, applies marriage laws without regard to gender, and specifies that laws using gender-specific terms like husband and wife include same-sex spouses. After 2014, existing domestic partnerships are converted to marriages, except for seniors. It preserves the right of clergy or religious organizations to refuse to perform or recognize any marriage or accommodate wedding ceremonies. The bill does not affect licensing of religious organizations providing adoption, foster-care, or child-placement.

== History ==
Title 26 of the Revised Code of Washington, entitled "domestic relations", governs marriage in Washington state. A 2012 bill, Senate Bill 6239, would legalize same-sex marriage and convert into a marriage on June 30, 2014, any undissolved state registered domestic partnership that does not involve at least one party aged 62 years or older. It also would add language in Section 26.04.010 exempting religious organizations from any requirement to "provide accommodations, facilities, advantages, privileges, services, or goods related to the solemnization or celebration of a marriage". Governor Christine Gregoire signed the engrossed bill on February 13. The bill was scheduled to take effect June 7 – 90 days after the legislative session — but opponents submitted on June 6 the necessary signatures to suspend the bill and require a statewide voter referendum. On June 12, the Washington secretary of state announced that they had submitted enough signatures to place the referendum on the ballot for the November general election.

== Support and opposition ==
Statements for and against the bill were available online as part of the official online voter's guide for the referendum. Per Section 42.17A on "campaign disclosure and contribution", the Washington state Public Disclosure Commission posted campaign information online, including information for referendums and initiatives, showing seven groups registered for approval of the bill and one against. Of these, Washington United for Marriage (WUM) and Preserve Marriage Washington were the most active, for and against the bill, respectively.

WUM lists "a coalition of more than 500 organizations and businesses" on its website. Amazon's Jeff Bezos and his then-wife Mackenzie Scott pledged $2.5 million to support the same-sex marriage law. Steve Ballmer of Microsoft and co-founder Bill Gates each donated $100,000 to the campaign in support as well. Starbucks, Nike, Inc., REI, Alcoa, Expedia, Inc., T-Mobile, Nordstrom, the Seattle Metropolitan Chamber of Commerce, and dozens of other businesses also supported the bill. United States President Barack Obama encouraged support as well.

Opposition to the bill was coordinated largely by the National Organization for Marriage (NOM) and the Roman Catholic Archdiocese of Seattle, which encouraged support for rejecting the bill among all parishes. Parishes planned "in-pew donations as part of what it is calling Preserve Marriage month" and NOM was expected to bring in additional money from outside the state.

Several newspapers in Washington state supported the bill, with the Seattle Times also launching an interactive social media campaign to encourage readers to support the bill publicly. Other endorsements included the Tacoma News-Tribune, Spokane's The Spokesman-Review, Vancouver's The Columbian, Yakima Herald-Republic, Tri-City Herald, Everett's The Herald, The Olympian, The Wenatchee World, and the Walla Walla Union-Bulletin.

== Campaign fundraising ==
Referendum 74 generated a large number of individual donations which may have surpassed the 2008 record of 13,500 for the Washington Death with Dignity Act. As of July 3, 2012, Referendum 74 sponsor Preserve Marriage Washington (seeking "rejection" votes) had reportedly raised $132,000, while Washington United for Marriage (seeking "approval" votes) raised $1.9 million. As of August, campaign-financing proponents showed a 13-to-1 fundraising advantage for same-sex marriage, but a National Organization for Marriage campaign director was confident that $4 million would appear as needed. A Public Disclosure Commission complaint has been filed, accusing both Preserve Marriage Washington and the National Organization for Marriage of having failed to report donations as required by law. As of October 5, 2012, proponents of Referendum 74 Washington United for Marriage have raised $9.4 million in donations and opponents Preserve Marriage Washington have raised about $1 million.

== Opinion polls ==
Various public opinion surveys of Washington residents asked questions regarding same-sex marriage. The questions vary, with some surveys referring directly to Referendum 74 and others asking more general questions. A post-election poll indicated much stronger support for such marriage among women than men across several categories.

Date of opinion poll	Conducted by	Sample size	For	Against	Undecided	Margin of error	Question
October 10–30, 2011	University of Washington Center for Survey Research	938	55%	38%	7%	±3.2%	"Next year, the legislature could pass a law allowing gay and lesbian couples to get married. If that happens, there could be a referendum in which voters would beasked to approve or reject the law. If such a referendum were held today: Would you vote YES – that is, to keep a law in place allowing gay and lesbian couples to marry OR would you vote NO, against the law – to make it so that gay and lesbian couples could not marry?"
January 12–16, 2012	SurveyUSA	617	47%	46%	7%	±4.0%	"If the legislature were to approve marriage for same-sex couples, and you were asked to approve or reject the law, how would you vote?"
February 7–9, 2012	Elway Research	405	51%	45%	4%	±5.0%	"Should gay and lesbian couples have the same legal right to marry as straight couples?"
February 13–15, 2012	SurveyUSA	572	50%	45%	5%	±4.2%	"A new law will allow same-sex couples to marry in Washington state. If you were asked to approve or reject the law, how would you vote?"
February 16–19, 2012	Public Policy Polling	1,264	50%	46%	4%	±2.76%	"If there was a referendum on the new law legalizing same-sex marriage, would you vote to uphold the law, or would you vote to repeal it?"
May 22–24, 2012	Strategies 360	500	54%	33%	12%	±4.4%	"Do you think it should be legal or illegal for gay and lesbian couples to get married?"
May 29–30, 2012	SurveyUSA	661	40%	37%	23%	±3.9%	"The state legislature has passed a bill to allow same-sex couples to marry, while allowing clergy and religious organizations to refuse to perform, recognize or accommodate any marriage ceremony. The issue may appear on the ballot in November as Measure 74, asking voters to approve or reject the bill. If Measure 74 is on the ballot, will you vote to approve the bill? Vote to reject the bill? Or are you not yet sure how you will vote?"
June 14–17, 2012	Public Policy Polling	1,073	51%	42%	7%	±3.0%	"Do you think same-sex marriage should be legal or illegal?"
July 16–17, 2012	SurveyUSA	630	50%	43%	7%	±4.0%	"A new law passed by the legislature would allow same-sex couples to marry in Washington state. Should this law be approved? Or rejected?"
September 7–9, 2012	SurveyUSA	524	56%	38%	6%	±4.3%	"A new law passed by the legislature would allow same-sex couples to marry in Washington state. Should this law be approved? Or rejected?"
September 9–12, 2012	Elway Poll	405	51%	37%	12%	±5%	"The legislature passed Engrossed Substitute Senate Bill 6239 concerning marriage for same-sex couples, modified domestic-partnership law, and religious freedom, and voters have filed a sufficient referendum petition on this bill. This bill would allow same-sex couples to marry, preserve domestic partnerships only for seniors, and preserve the right of clergy or religious organizations to refuse to perform, recognize, or accommodate any marriage ceremony. Should this bill be: Approved...Rejected."
September 28–30, 2012	Survey USA	540	55%	40%	6%	±4.3%	"A new law passed by the legislature would allow same-sex couples to marry in Washington state. Should this law be approved? Or rejected?"
October 1–16, 2012	University of Washington Center for Survey Research	644	54.1%	38.4%	5.7%	±3.9%	"Statewide ballot referendum seventy-four (74) concerns marriage for same-sex couples. This referendum would allow same-sex couples to marry, preserve domestic partnerships only for seniors, and preserve the right of clergy or religious organizations to refuse to perform, recognize, or accommodate any marriage ceremony."
October 12–14, 2012	Survey USA	543	54%	41%	5%	±4.3%	"A new law passed by the legislature would allow same-sex couples to marry in Washington state. Should this law be approved? Or rejected?"
October 17–20, 2012	Strategies360	500	55%	38%	8%	±4.4%	"Here is the next one. This initiative is called Referendum 74. The legislature passed a bill concerning marriage for same-sex couples, modified domestic-partnership law, and religious freedom, and voters have filed a referendum on this bill. This bill would allow same-sex couples to marry, preserve domestic partnerships only for seniors, and preserve the right of clergy or religious organizations to refuse to perform, recognize, or accommodate any marriage ceremony. Should this bill be approved or rejected?"
October 18–21, 2012	Elway Poll	451	49%	45%	6%	±4.5%	"The legislature passed Engrossed Substitute Senate Bill 6239 concerning marriage for same-sex couples, modified domestic-partnership law, and religious freedom, and voters have filed a sufficient referendum petition on this bill. This bill would allow same-sex couples to marry, preserve domestic partnerships only for seniors, and preserve the right of clergy or religious organizations to refuse to perform, recognize, or accommodate any marriage ceremony. Should this bill be: Approved...Rejected."
October 18–31, 2012	University of Washington Center for Survey Research	632	57.9%	36.9%	5.7%	±3.9%	"Statewide ballot referendum seventy-four (74) concerns marriage for same-sex couples. This referendum would allow same-sex couples to marry, preserve domestic partnerships only for seniors, and preserve the right of clergy or religious organizations to refuse to perform, recognize, or accommodate any marriage ceremony."
October 28–31, 2012	Survey USA	555	52%	43%	5%	±4.2%	"A new law passed by the legislature would allow same-sex couples to marry in Washington state. Should this law be approved? Or rejected?"
November 1–3, 2012	Public Policy Polling	932	52%	42%	6%	±3.2%	"Referendum Measure No. 74 deals with Senate Bill 6239, which would allow same-sex couples to marry, preserve domestic partnerships only for seniors, and preserve the right of clergy or religious organizations to refuse to perform, recognize, or accommodate any marriage ceremony. Do you think this bill should be approved or rejected?"

== Results ==
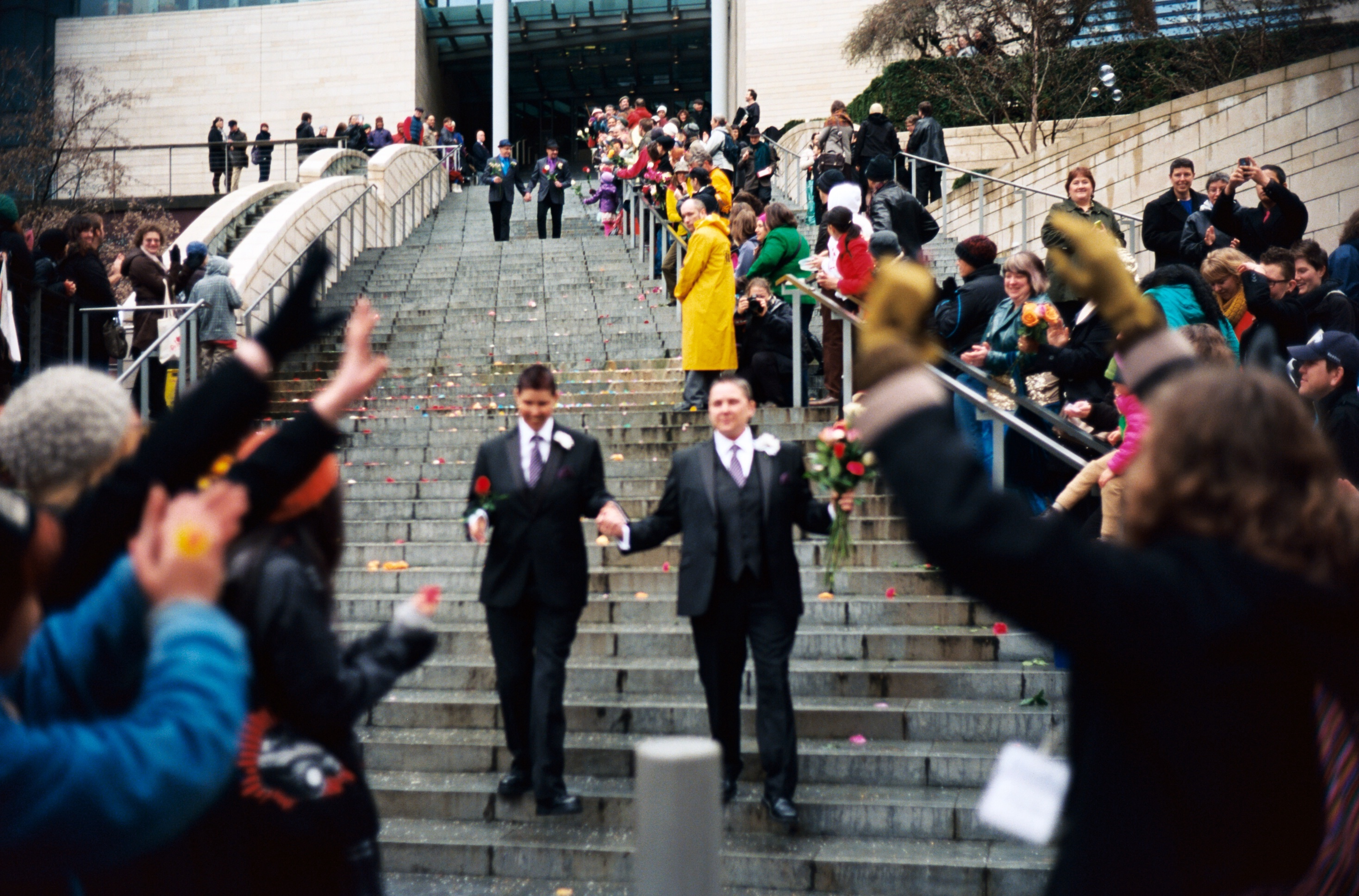
Recently married couples leaving Seattle City Hall are greeted by well-wishers on the first day of same-sex marriage in Washington state.

Upon certification, Secretary of State Sam Reed partially credited the referendum for encouraging voter turnout of 81%, the highest in the nation. County offices in King and Thurston counties opened at 12:01 a.m. after the measure was certified, with celebrations in support outside of several government offices, with various same-sex weddings scheduled, free of charge, beginning just after midnight on December 9, just after the mandatory three-day waiting period applying to all Washington weddings.

2012 Washington Referendum 74
Choice	Votes	%
For	1,659,915	53.70
Against	1,431,285	46.30
Total	3,091,200	100.00
Source: Washington Secretary of State

=== By county ===
County results
County	Yes		No		Margin		Total votes
County	#	%	#	%	#	%	Total votes
Adams	1,329	28.14%	3,394	71.86%	-2,065	-43.72%	4,723
Asotin	3,641	36.98%	6,205	63.02%	-2,564	-26.04%	9,846
Benton	29,109	36.79%	50,007	63.21%	-20,898	-26.41%	79,116
Chelan	13,624	42.63%	18,337	57.37%	-4,713	-14.75%	31,961
Clallam	17,933	47.51%	19,814	52.49%	-1,881	-4.98%	37,747
Clark	88,870	47.40%	98,637	52.60%	-9,767	-5.21%	187,507
Columbia	726	32.15%	1,532	67.85%	-806	-35.70%	2,258
Cowlitz	18,576	41.98%	25,672	58.02%	-7,096	-16.04%	44,248
Douglas	5,336	35.82%	9,559	64.18%	-4,223	-28.35%	14,895
Ferry	1,210	35.30%	2,218	64.70%	-1,008	-29.40%	3,428
Franklin	7,069	31.34%	15,490	68.66%	-8,421	-37.33%	22,559
Garfield	361	28.61%	901	71.39%	-540	-42.79%	1,262
Grant	8,518	31.16%	18,820	68.84%	-10,302	-37.68%	27,338
Grays Harbor	13,214	46.16%	15,412	53.84%	-2,198	-7.68%	28,626
Island	21,687	52.24%	19,824	47.76%	1,863	4.49%	41,511
Jefferson	12,458	63.74%	7,087	36.26%	5,371	27.48%	19,545
King	638,939	67.00%	314,639	33.00%	324,300	34.01%	953,578
Kitsap	66,271	53.99%	56,470	46.01%	9,801	7.99%	122,741
Kittitas	8,215	45.70%	9,760	54.30%	-1,545	-8.60%	17,975
Klickitat	4,278	42.38%	5,816	57.62%	-1,538	-15.24%	10,094
Lewis	11,932	35.17%	21,992	64.83%	-10,060	-29.65%	33,924
Lincoln	1,654	28.47%	4,155	71.53%	-2,501	-43.05%	5,809
Mason	13,498	47.98%	14,632	52.02%	-1,134	-4.03%	28,130
Okanogan	6,662	40.04%	9,977	59.96%	-3,315	-19.92%	16,639
Pacific	4,934	47.31%	5,494	52.69%	-560	-5.37%	10,428
Pend Oreille	2,242	33.72%	4,407	66.28%	-2,165	-32.56%	6,649
Pierce	168,656	49.59%	171,453	50.41%	-2,797	-0.82%	340,109
San Juan	7,395	71.16%	2,997	28.84%	4,398	42.32%	10,392
Skagit	27,482	50.23%	27,233	49.77%	249	0.46%	54,715
Skamania	2,430	45.18%	2,949	54.82%	-519	-9.65%	5,379
Snohomish	172,744	52.97%	153,358	47.03%	19,386	5.94%	326,102
Spokane	98,659	44.34%	123,838	55.66%	-25,179	-11.32%	222,497
Stevens	6,977	31.36%	15,272	68.64%	-8,295	-37.28%	22,249
Thurston	70,285	56.07%	55,070	43.93%	15,215	12.14%	125,355
Wahkiakum	946	42.44%	1,283	57.56%	-337	-15.12%	2,229
Walla Walla	9,894	39.66%	15,056	60.34%	-5,162	-20.69%	24,950
Whatcom	55,788	55.08%	45,500	44.92%	10,288	10.16%	101,288
Whitman	8,554	50.66%	8,330	49.34%	224	1.33%	16,884
Yakima	27,819	36.36%	48,695	63.64%	-20,876	-27.28%	76,514
Totals	1,659,915	53.70%	1,431,285	46.30%	228,630	7.40%	3,091,200

=== By congressional district ===
"Yes" won six of ten congressional districts.

District	Yes	No	Representative
1st	54%	46%	Suzan DelBene
2nd	56%	44%	Rick Larsen
3rd	45%	55%	Jaime Herrera Beutler
4th	35%	65%	Doc Hastings
5th	43%	57%	Cathy McMorris Rodgers
6th	53%	47%	Norm Dicks
6th	53%	47%	Derek Kilmer
7th	79%	21%	Jim McDermott
8th	49%	51%	Dave Reichert
9th	60%	40%	Adam Smith
10th	51%	49%	Denny Heck

== See also ==
- Andersen v. King County
- Domestic partnership in Washington state
- LGBT rights in Washington (state)
- Minnesota Amendment 1
- Same-sex marriage in Washington state
- Washington Referendum 71 (2009)

=== Other same-sex marriage referendums ===
- Australian Marriage Law Postal Survey, 2017
- 2016 Bermudian same-sex union and marriage referendum
- 2013 Croatian constitutional referendum
- Irish same-sex marriage referendum, 2015
- 2015 Slovak same-sex marriage referendum
- 2015 Slovenian same-sex marriage referendum
- United States:
  - 2008 California Proposition 8
  - Maine:
    - 2009 Maine same-sex marriage referendum
    - 2012 Maine same-sex marriage referendum
  - 2012 Maryland same-sex marriage referendum
  - 2012 Washington same-sex marriage referendum
