= Domestic partnership in the United States =

In the United States, domestic partnership is a city-, county-, state-, or employer-recognized status that may be available to same-sex couples and, sometimes, opposite-sex couples. Although similar to marriage, a domestic partnership does not confer any of the myriad rights and responsibilities of marriage afforded to married couples by the federal government. Domestic partnerships in the United States are determined by each state or local jurisdiction, so there is no nationwide consistency on the rights, responsibilities, and benefits accorded domestic partners.

Couples who live in localities without civil unions or domestic partnerships may voluntarily enter into a private, informal domestic partnership agreement, specifying their mutual obligations; however, this involves drawing up a number of separate legal documents, including wills, power of attorney, healthcare directives, child custody agreements, etc., and is best done with the guidance of a local attorney. Without governmental enforcement of the agreement, all such provisions of the partnership may be ignored by hospitals, healthcare professionals, or other persons, and may be held invalid by state courts in disputes over child custody or over a deceased partner's estate.

== Terminology ==
As understood in the United States, a civil union is a legally recognized status almost identical to marriage, whereas domestic partnership often connotes a lesser status that may or may not be recognized by local law. However, the terminology is still evolving; the exact level of rights and responsibilities of domestic partnership depends on the particular law of a given jurisdiction.

Since 1999, the West Coast states of California, Oregon, Washington, and Nevada have all passed domestic partnership statutes; in contrast, most legislatures in the New England region and New Jersey have preferred the term civil unions.

In many other countries, the equivalent legal status is referred to as registered partnership, and domestic partnership refers to cohabitation, rather than a legal status.

== Legal rights ==
The legal rights afforded to partners depends on the location. State-level recognition of partners is, generally, significantly stronger and can help partners secure benefits such as leave similar to that provided under the Family and Medical Leave Act. The range of benefits is generally greater in such cities as San Francisco, New York City, and Washington, D.C.

== Employment benefits ==
Cities, boroughs, towns, townships, unincorporated areas, and villages that offers domestic partner benefits Counties, consolidated city-counties, boroughs, parishes, and independent cities that offers domestic partner benefits State-wide partner benefits through same-sex marriage, civil unions, domestic partnership, designated beneficiary agreements, or reciprocal beneficiary relationships State-wide partner benefits through same-sex marriage, civil unions, domestic partnership, designated beneficiary agreements, or reciprocal beneficiary relationships, including state-wide domestic partnership benefits for state employees^{1}^{1}Civil unions legal in six Arizona cities

Some public- and private-sector U.S. employers provide health insurance or other spousal benefits to same-sex partners of employees, although the employee receiving benefits for his or her partner may have to pay income tax on the value of the benefit.

Partner benefits are more common among large employers, colleges and universities than at small businesses. The qualifications for and benefits of domestic partnership status vary from employer to employer; some recognize only same-sex or different-sex couples, while others recognize both.

According to data from the Human Rights Campaign Foundation, the majority of Fortune 500 companies provided benefits to same-sex partners of employees as of June 2006. Overall, 41 percent of HR professionals indicate that their organizations offered some form of domestic partner benefits (opposite-sex partners, same-sex partners or both).

The San Francisco Human Rights Commission maintains a list of health insurance providers that offer insurance plans that cover domestic partners, or employee+1 coverage online: Domestic partner insurance provider search. The Human Rights Campaign Foundation offers best practices on how to implement them.

=== Taxation of benefits ===
Laws regarding same-sex partnerships by state, county, and local level in the United States^{1} Same-sex unions granting privileges similar to marriage^{2} Domestic partnership granting limited/enumerated privileges State grants benefits to state employees Same-sex unions not provided^{1}Not recognized by the federal government. However, same-sex marriage is legal nationwide (excluding American Samoa and some Native American tribal jurisdictions) and is recognized by the federal government.^{2}Domestic partnerships in Washington are only available when at least one of the partners is 62 years of age or older.

IRS Regulation Section 1.61-21(b)(1) generally requires that the imputed value of the benefit be considered taxable income. For example, if an employee covers his or her partner under an employer health insurance plan, the estimated amount the employer pays to cover the partner will be added to the employee's salary for tax purposes, unless the employee's partner is a qualifying dependent under Section 152. The same is not true for married couples. There are some exceptions that allow for tax-free domestic partner benefits, such as for a domestic partner that qualifies as a dependent under Internal Revenue Code Sections 152(a)(9) through 152(b)(5), a certification and annual recertification that the support and relationship tests of section 152(a)(9) are met, and the relationship between the employee and domestic partner does not violate local law.

The proposed Tax Parity for Health Plan Beneficiaries Act would remove these tax inequities.

== Cities and counties with domestic partnership registries ==
Some U.S. cities offer domestic partnership registries. Some private employers use domestic partnership registrations for the purpose of determining employee eligibility for domestic partner benefits. The following are some examples of such registries.

=== New York City ===
Domestic partnerships in New York City exist for same sex couples and opposite sex couples in which both are above the age of 18 and are New York City residents (or at least one party to the partnership is an employee of the City of New York). The status provides essentially three benefits: (1) the ability to remain in a "rent controlled" apartment after the domestic partner lease holder dies, (2) the ability to visit the domestic partner in a city hospital or jail and (3) the ability of city employees to obtain subsidized health insurance for their partners and to obtain the benefits of the Family Medical Leave Act.

Signed into law by Rudolph Giuliani on July 7, 1997, the law codified executive orders by the previous two administrations. Other communities provide similar benefits; however one town, Eastchester, which had provided domestic partner benefits, has withdrawn the plan. State employees have received similar benefits under executive orders of the Governor and have been given priority over bodily remains of Domestic Partner as enacted into law by Gov. George Pataki in February 2006. For a discussion of both the history and implementation of New York Domestic partnerships see the June 2003 report of an official New York City Council study.

=== San Francisco ===
In 1982, a domestic partnership law was adopted and passed by the San Francisco Board of Supervisors, but Dianne Feinstein, mayor of San Francisco at the time, vetoed it under intense pressure from the Catholic Church. Another such law was adopted in San Francisco in 1989, but it was repealed by voter initiative. Domestic partnerships in San Francisco were created by Proposition K, another voter initiative, in 1990. As of 2026, the city still offers a domestic partnership status separate from that offered by the state; city residents can apply for both.

=== Cities in Ohio ===
The first city to offer domestic partnerships in Ohio was Cleveland Heights in 2003, which was passed by voter referendum. In 2007, Toledo, Ohio, became the second city in Ohio to offer domestic partnerships. In 2008, the Cleveland City Council voted to enact a domestic partner registry. In 2011, the Athens City Council established a domestic partner registry. In 2012, the Dayton City Commission, the Cincinnati City Council, and the Columbus City Council approved ordinances creating domestic partnership registries. Yellow Springs, Ohio, also passed a domestic partnership registry in 2012, as did Oberlin.

== States offering domestic partnership or civil union status ==
State laws regarding same-sex unions similar to marriage in the United States^{1} Domestic partnerships or civil unions granting state privileges of marriage^{2} Domestic partnerships granting limited/enumerated privileges No same-sex unions similar to marriage Same-sex unions similar to marriage banned Same-sex and opposite-sex unions similar to marriage banned^{1}Not recognized by the federal government. However, same-sex marriage is legal nationwide (excluding American Samoa and some Native American tribal jurisdictions) and is recognized by the federal government. Same-sex unions similar to marriage are provided at the local level in many jurisdictions.^{2}Domestic partnerships in Washington are only available when at least one of the partners is 62 years of age or older.

Laws regarding same-sex partnerships similar to marriage by state, county, and local level in the United States^{1} Same-sex unions similar to marriage^{2} Domestic partnership granting limited/enumerated privileges State grants benefits to state employees Same-sex unions not provided^{1}Not recognized by the federal government. However, same-sex marriage is legal nationwide (excluding American Samoa and some Native American tribal jurisdictions) and is recognized by the federal government.^{2}Domestic partnerships in Washington are only available when at least one of the partners is 62 years of age or older.

=== California ===
Domestic partnerships in California exist for same-sex couples and for opposite-sex couples. The state of California first offered domestic partnerships in 2000. The Domestic Partner Rights and Responsibilities Act, which added nearly all the state rights and responsibilities of marriage to domestic partnerships was signed in 2003 and took effect in 2005. Couples in state registered domestic partnerships prior to 2005 who remained registered on January 1, 2005, became entitled to the rights and responsibilities of the new law. Paid Family Leave covers registered domestic partners. In 2007, domestic partnerships were allowed to change their surnames and jointly file state income taxes - eliminating the last piece of discrimination in the domestic partnerships laws at the state level.

=== Colorado ===
Since July 1, 2009, both opposite sex and same sex couples have been able to enter a designated beneficiary agreement which will grant them limited rights. Civil unions became available as well on May 1, 2013.

=== District of Columbia ===
Domestic partnership in the District of Columbia have been recognized since 1992. Effective since March 1, 2002 and expanded further to "near spousal level" rights which were given by a district vote in 2003, 2005, 2007, 2008 and in 2009.

=== Hawaii ===
Reciprocal beneficiary registration was enacted in 1997. The law took effect on June 1, 1997. Civil unions became available to same- and opposite-sex couples on January 1, 2012.

=== Illinois ===
The Village of Oak Park, Illinois in October 1997 began offering a domestic partnership registry for same-sex couples. Largely symbolic, the registry was the first of its kind in the state, and it required couples to swear that they were in committed relationships of at least six months. Oak Park's Village Board had approved the registry at a meeting in September 1997.

=== Maine ===
Domestic partnerships in Maine, enacted in 2004, exist for all couples, regardless of sex. The law took effect on January 1, 2005.

=== Maryland ===
Two bills, providing some limited domestic partnership rights for same-sex and different-sex couples, were passed by the 2008 General Assembly and came into effect on July 1 of that year.

=== Nevada ===
A bill put forth creating a domestic partnership registry with the State attorney's office, passed by both chambers of the Nevada Legislature in early May 2009, but was vetoed by Gov. Jim Gibbons. On May 31, 2009, the Legislature overrode the governor's veto, thus putting domestic partnerships into effect. In 2002, Nevada voters approved Question 2 -- the referendum banning state recognition of same-sex marriages. The domestic partnerships are not officially marriages, but may be elevated to the status of a marriage if the couple involved wishes to proceed thus far (just like California). Heterosexual couples may also apply for a domestic partnership under Nevada law. The law took effect October 1, 2009.

=== New Jersey ===
Domestic partnerships in New Jersey have been available since July 30, 2004 for same-sex couples, and for opposite-sex couples in which one person is above the age of 62. However, on October 25, 2006, the Supreme Court of New Jersey ruled that under the New Jersey state constitution, the state could not deny the benefits of marriage to same-sex couples, although the court left it up to the legislature whether to call such relationships marriage or to use a different term. Complying with the court's ruling, on December 14, 2006, the New Jersey Legislature passed a bill establishing civil unions for same-sex couples, which was signed into law by the governor on December 21 and came into effect on February 19, 2007.

=== Oregon ===
House Bill 2007, the Oregon Family Fairness Act, created legal recognition for same-sex couples and their families through domestic partnerships. The bill was signed by Governor Ted Kulongoski on May 9, 2007, and was due to come into effect on the following January 1. However, on December 28, 2007, a federal judge delayed implementation of the law pending a hearing on the legality of a petition drive to overturn the law. On February 1, the judge lifted the injunction on the law. Same-sex couples were able to register beginning February 4. Oregon is the first state in the Union to offer domestic partnerships with all the state-granted rights of heterosexual marriage to same-sex couples despite a statewide constitutional ban on same-sex marriage.

=== Wisconsin ===
The Wisconsin legislature passed its 2009-2010 Budget on June 26, 2009. Governor Jim Doyle included language in the bill to allow for domestic partnership registrations for all unmarried persons, that will provide certain and limited rights and obligations of marriage. Wisconsin is not the first state to offer such domestic partnership benefits despite having a constitutional ban on same-sex marriage and comparable alternatives, like civil unions. A legal analysis found on May 15, 2009, that adding such language to the budget despite the bans was likely legal. The law took effect August 3, 2009. Wisconsin ended its domestic partnership registry on April 1, 2018.

=== Washington ===
The Washington State Legislature approved a bill establishing domestic partnerships in the state during the 2007 (expanded further in 2008 and 2009) legislative sessions. All domestic partnership bills were signed by Governor Christine Gregoire.

Referendum 71 sought voter confirmation of the 2009 domestic partnership extensions (SB 5688) in the 2009 elections. The bill was approved by 53 percent of the voters and became law.

From June 30, 2014, domestic partnerships have only been available when at least one of the partners is sixty-two years of age or older.

=== Other states ===
Many states recognize through their judicial systems cohabitation agreements and common law partner agreements concluded between two partners in a relationship. These are de facto domestic partnerships that protect both parties and allow for shared property and court recognition of their relationships.

Additionally sometimes adult adoption by gay couples creates a de jure domestic partnership in all 50 states.

== Domestic partnership initiatives ==
=== Establish/expand ===
Election date	Locale	Outcome
November 7, 1989	San Francisco, California	Failed with 49.5% voting in favor.
November 6, 1990	San Francisco, California	Passed with 54% voting in favor.
March 2, 2004	San Francisco, California	Passed with 68% voting in favor.
May 13, 2006	Austin, Texas	Passed with 65.07% voting in favor.
November 7, 2006	Colorado (Referendum I)	Defeated with 53% voting against.

=== Repeal/prohibit ===
Election date	Locale	Outcome
November 6, 1990	Seattle, Washington	Failed.
November 5, 1991	San Francisco, California	Failed with 59.1% voting against.
May 7, 1994	Austin, Texas	Repealed with 62% voting in favor.
November 7, 1995	Northampton, Massachusetts	Repealed by a margin of 87 votes.
November 6, 2001	Houston, Texas	Passed with 52% voting in favor.
November 3, 2009	Washington (Referendum 71)	Defeated with 53% voting in favor.
November 2, 2010	El Paso, Texas	Repealed with 55% voting in favor.

== Similar legal status classifications ==
- Civil union
- Common-law marriage
- Same-sex marriage

== See also ==
- Diaz v. Brewer
- Timeline of civil marriage in the United States
- LGBT rights in the United States
- Rights and responsibilities of marriages in the United States
- Same-sex marriage in the United States
- Same-sex unions in the United States
