= Same-sex marriage in Washington (state) =

Same-sex marriage has been legally recognized in the U.S. state of Washington since December 6, 2012. On February 13, 2012, Governor Christine Gregoire signed legislation that established full marriage rights for same-sex couples in the state of Washington. Opponents mounted a challenge that required voters to approve the statute at a referendum, which they did on November 6. The law took effect on December 6, and the first marriages were performed on December 9. Within a couple of days, more than 600 marriage licenses were issued to same-sex couples in King County alone. Washington was the seventh U.S. state, and the eighth U.S. jurisdiction (after the District of Columbia), to legalize same-sex marriages. (Note: After Massachusetts, Connecticut, Iowa, Vermont, New Hampshire and New York, but excluding California which had constitutionally banned same-sex marriage in November 2008, but still recognized marriages performed between June and November 2008.) Polling suggests that a large majority of Washington residents support the legal recognition of same-sex marriage. Prior to legalization in December 2012, the Washington State Legislature had enacted a law recognizing domestic partnerships providing some of the rights and benefits of marriage in 2007.

Previously, in 1998, the state had enacted a statute that restricted marriage to different-sex couples, reinforcing its statutes which had been interpreted by a state court in 1974 as imposing the same restriction. Several lawsuits filed in state court challenged the state's marriage laws without success, including one filed in 1971, one of the first such cases in the United States.

== Domestic partnerships ==
Advocates of marriage rights for same-sex couples, lacking the votes in the Washington State Legislature to accomplish their objective, instead focused on enacting domestic partnerships that would grant couples some of the rights attached to marriage. A law to this effect was approved by the State Legislature in 2007. This legal status was also made available under certain circumstances to different-sex couples. The legislation took effect on April 22, 2007, and a law expanding the rights of domestic partners was upheld by voters in Referendum 71 two years later. Following the legalization of same-sex marriage, domestic partnerships became restricted to couples where at least one of the partners is sixty-two years of age or older.

== Same-sex marriage ==
=== Background ===
In September 1996, in response to events in Hawaii—including the Baehr v. Miike decision—which suggested that the state might legalize same-sex marriage, the United States Congress passed the Defense of Marriage Act (DOMA), which defined marriage as between "a man and a woman" and explicitly permitted states to refuse to recognize same-sex marriages performed in other states. In conjunction with dozens of other states as part of a nationwide legal panic following the events in Hawaii, the Washington State Legislature passed a bill in February 1997 that defined marriage as the "union of a man and a woman" and denied legal recognition to same-sex marriages established elsewhere. The vote was 63 to 35 in the House and 27 to 19 in the Senate. Governor Gary Locke vetoed the legislation on February 21, calling it "divisive and unnecessary", citing the 1974 state court decision in Singer v. Hara. He wrote in his veto message: "Our overarching principle should be to promote civility, mutual respect and unity. This legislation fails to meet this test." An attempt to override his veto failed in the Senate on a party-line vote, 26 to 20, when seven Democrats who had originally supported the measure changed their position to support Governor Locke. Although Republicans threatened to put the issue to a popular referendum in November, some of their members thought the issue was not urgent enough to risk a contentious public campaign.

In February 1998, the State Legislature passed the same legislation as House Bill 1130, and expected Governor Locke to allow it to become law without his signature. Instead, he vetoed it a second time, saying that "our laws right now prohibit same-gender marriages, and I oppose this legislation because it is trying to make illegal something that is already illegal". The State Legislature overruled his veto. Democrats who feared the impact of having the legislation on the November ballot helped override his veto. One Democratic leader in the House, Marlin Appelwick, said: "I'll vote to override. I'll stand up and say it's a bad bill, but it's even worse to have this issue on the ballot." According to The Seattle Times: "Lawmakers, eager to be done with the controversial issue, rushed the ban through in minutes and dumped it in the governor's lap. Locke's veto came within the hour. Then both houses voted summarily to override the veto. No one could remember the last time a bill was passed, vetoed and overridden within hours–with almost no discussion and no debate."

=== Lawsuits ===
Same-sex marriage in the United States

==== Singer v. Hara ====
In 1971, in Seattle, in one of the first same-sex marriage lawsuits in the United States, gay activists John Singer (later known as Faygele Ben-Miriam) and Paul Barwick requested a marriage license from the King County Auditor, Lloyd Hara, to demonstrate the inequality between gay and heterosexual couples. Hara refused, and Singer and Barwick brought suit on the grounds that the denial violated the Equal Rights Amendment of the State Constitution. The Washington Court of Appeals denied the claim in 1974 in Singer v. Hara, and the Washington Supreme Court later refused to review the decision.

==== Andersen v. King County ====
On March 8, 2004, six same-sex couples represented by Lambda Legal filed suit in state court challenging the constitutionality of Washington's statutory same-sex marriage ban. The four constitutional claims were based on due process, privacy, equal protection and gender equality. On August 4, King County Superior Court Judge William L. Downing issued an opinion in Andersen v. Sims that the state had no rational basis for excluding same-sex couples from the rights and benefits of marriage. The decision concluded that the state law limiting marriage to different-sex couples violated sections of the Constitution that required due process and equal protection of the laws. The court did not require the state to allow same-sex couples to marry, but mandated the creation of a civil union status that would provide all the rights and benefits of marriage. Downing stayed enforcement of his order pending appeal to the Washington Supreme Court. On April 1, 2004, eleven same-sex couples represented by the American Civil Liberties Union (ACLU) filed suit in state court challenging Washington's laws banning same-sex marriage. They also sought recognition of marriages legally performed in other jurisdictions. On September 7, Thurston County Superior Court Judge Richard D. Hicks ruled in Castle v. State that the state's marriage laws violated the Privileges and Immunities Clause of the State Constitution.

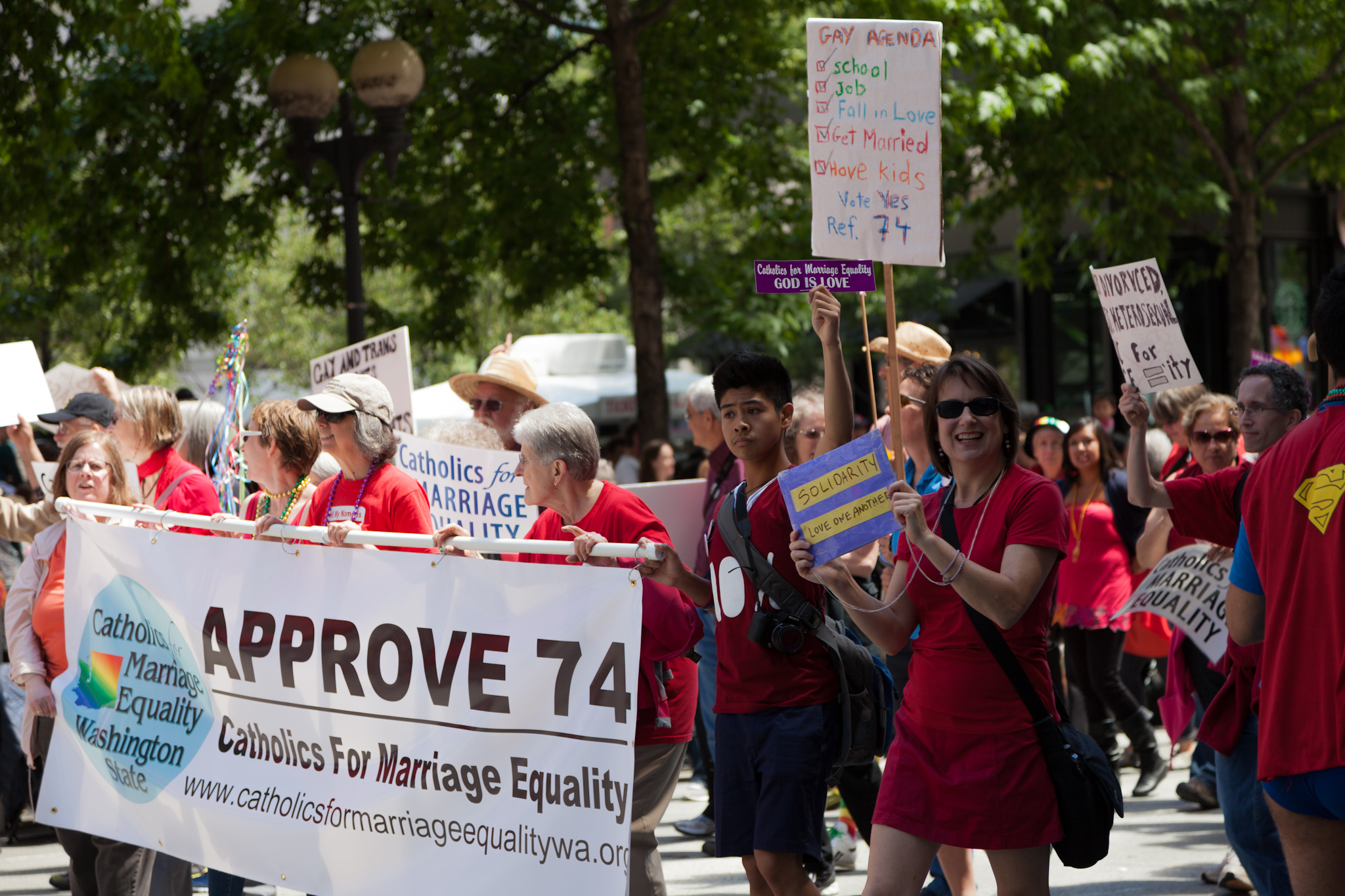
Supporters of same-sex marriage campaigning in June 2012, Seattle

The Washington Supreme Court consolidated the two cases, Andersen v. Sims and Castle v. State, for review as Andersen v. King County. It heard oral arguments on March 8, 2005. On July 26, 2006, it reversed the trial courts' determinations in a 4–5 ruling. The majority opinion focused on the constitutionality of the State Legislature's enactment of the statutory ban limiting the privileges of marriage to opposite-sex couples. In October 2006, the court refused to reconsider its ruling.

On January 10, 2007, the Washington Defense of Marriage Alliance, an activist organization that, despite its name, favored marriage rights for same-sex couples, filed a voter initiative, Initiative 957, to incorporate part of the Andersen decision into state statutes by making procreation a requirement for all marriages in Washington. The group's stated rationale was to prompt public examination of the premise that marriage exists for the purpose of procreation and to create a test case in which Andersen would be reversed. The initiative's sponsors withdrew it on July 3, after failing to gather a sufficient number of signatures to qualify for the November ballot.

=== Passage of legislation in 2012 ===
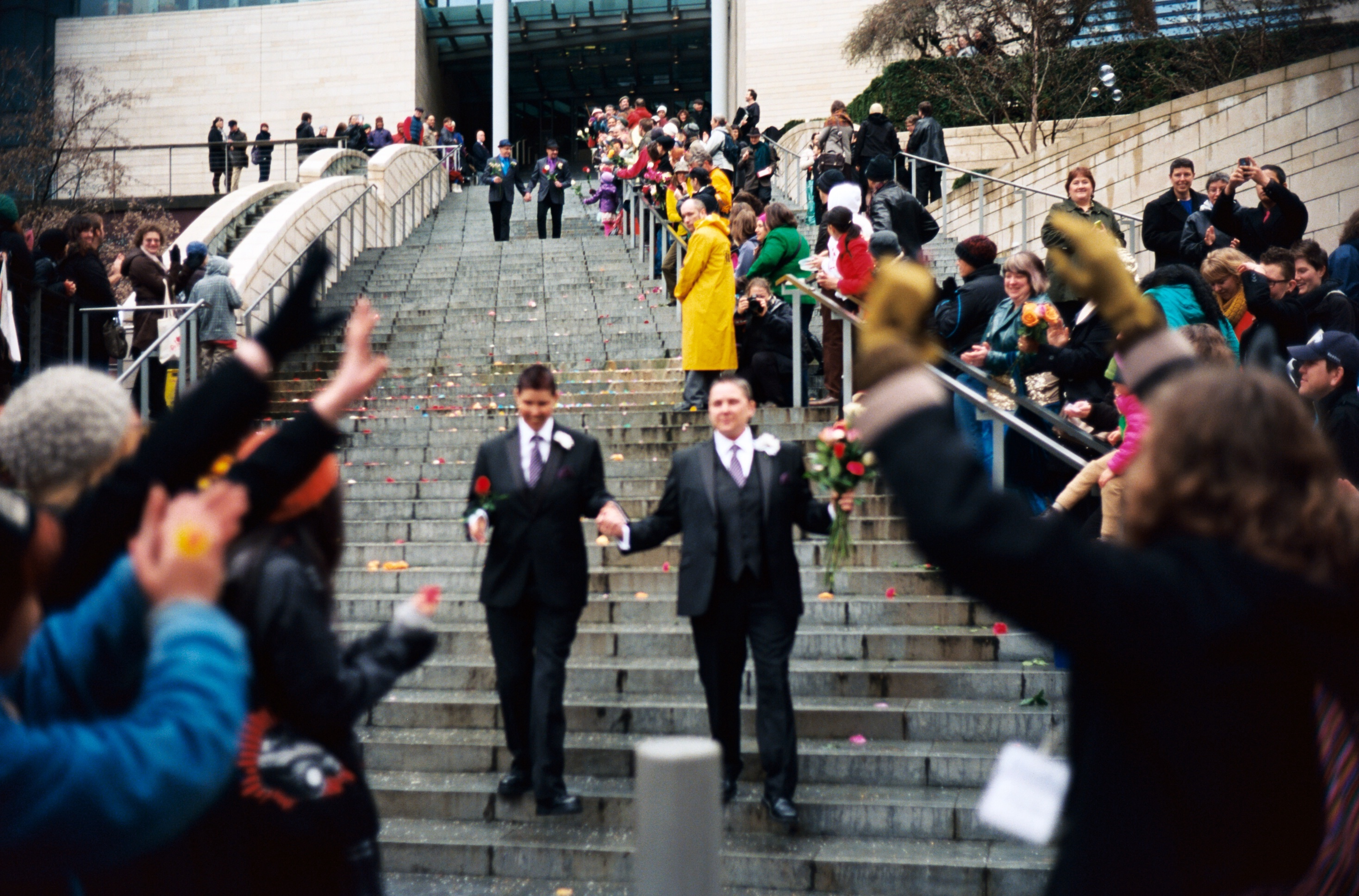
Just married couples at Seattle City Hall being greeted by well-wishers on the first day of same-sex marriage in Washington, December 9, 2012

Some of the first same-sex couples to be married in Washington proceeding to welcoming crowds down the steps of Seattle City Hall, December 9, 2012

A same-sex marriage bill was introduced in the 2007 legislative session, but failed to make it out of committee. On January 26, 2012, legislation legalizing same-sex marriage and converting most domestic partnerships not dissolved within two years into marriages passed the Washington State Senate's Committee for Government Operations, Tribal Relations and Elections. Republican Dan Swecker introduced four amendments that failed on a party-line vote of 3–4. Republican Don Benton asked for the legislation to be placed on the November 2012 ballot as a referendum, but his motion failed by a 3–4 vote. The bill was reported out of the committee by a 4–3 vote. It passed the Senate by a vote of 28–21 on February 1.

The House of Representatives took up the same measure and passed it out of the Judiciary Committee on January 30 by a 7–6 party-line vote. The committee voted on the Senate-approved version of the bill on February 6, passing it by a 7–5 vote, with one Republican committee member absent. The House passed the legislation on February 8 by a vote of 55–43. The legislation also provided that all domestic partnerships not involving at least one member aged 62 years or older and not dissolved within two years of the date the law would go into effect would automatically become marriages. Governor Christine Gregoire signed the bill into law on February 13. It was scheduled to take effect 90 days after the end of the legislative session.

February 1, 2012 vote in the Senate
Political affiliation	Voted for	Voted against	Absent (Did not vote)
Democratic Party	24: Lisa Brown; Maralyn Chase; Steve Conway; Tracey Eide; Karen Fraser; David Frockt; Nick Harper; Brian Hatfield; Mary Margaret Haugen; Steve Hobbs; Jim Kastama; Karen Keiser; Derek Kilmer; Adam Kline; Jeanne Kohl-Welles; Rosemary McAuliffe; Ed Murray; Sharon Nelson; Margarita Prentice; Craig Pridemore; Kevin Ranker; Debbie Regala; Christine Rolfes; Rodney Tom	3: Jim Hargrove; Tim Sheldon; Paull Shin	–
Republican Party	4: Joe Fain; Andy Hill; Steve Litzow; Cheryl Pflug	18: Michael Baumgartner; Randi Becker; Don Benton; Mike Carrell; Jerome Delvin; Doug Ericksen; Mike Hewitt; Janéa Holmquist Newbry; Jim Honeyford; Curtis King; Bob Morton; Mike Padden; Linda Evans Parlette; Pam Roach; Mark Schoesler; Val Stevens; Dan Swecker; Joseph Zarelli	–
Total	28	21	0
Total	57.1%	42.9%	0.0%

February 8, 2012 vote in the House of Representatives
Political affiliation	Voted for	Voted against	Absent (Did not vote)
Democratic Party	53: Sherry Appleton; Andy Billig; Brian Blake; Reuven Carlyle; Frank Chopp; Judy Clibborn; Eileen Cody; Jeannie Darneille; Mary Lou Dickerson; Hans Dunshee; Deborah Eddy; Fred Finn; Joe Fitzgibbon; Roger Goodman; Tami Green; Kathy Haigh; Drew Hansen; Bob Hasegawa; Zack Hudgins; Sam Hunt; Ross Hunter; Laurie Jinkins; Ruth Kagi; Troy Kelley; Phyllis Gutiérrez Kenney; Connie Ladenburg; Marko Liias; Kristine Lytton; Marcie Maxwell; John McCoy; Jim Moeller; Jeff Morris; Luis Moscoso; Timm Ormsby; Tina Orwall; Jamie Pedersen; Eric Pettigrew; Gerry Pollet; Tim Probst; Chris Reykdal; Mary Helen Roberts; Cindy Ryu; Sharon Tomiko Santos; Larry Seaquist; Mike Sells; Larry Springer; Derek Stanford; Pat Sullivan; Dean Takko; Steve Tharinger; Dave Upthegrove; Kevin Van De Wege; Sharon Wylie	3: Christopher Hurst; Steve Kirby; Mark Miloscia	–
Republican Party	2: Glenn Anderson; Maureen Walsh	40: John Ahern; Gary Alexander; Jan Angel; Mike Armstrong; Katrina Asay; Barbara Bailey; Vincent Buys; Bruce Chandler; Cary Condotta; Larry Crouse; Cathy Dahlquist; Bruce Dammeier; Richard DeBolt; Susan Fagan; Larry Haler; Mark Hargrove; Paul Harris; Bill Hinkle; Mike Hope; Norm Johnson; Brad Klippert; Joel Kretz; Dan Kristiansen; Jim McCune; Terry Nealey; Ed Orcutt; Jason Overstreet; Kevin Parker; Kirk Pearson; Ann Rivers; Jay Rodne; Charles Ross; Joe Schmick; Matt Shea; Shelly Short; Norma Smith; David Taylor; Judy Warnick; J. T. Wilcox; Hans Zeiger	–
Total	55	43	0
Total	56.1%	43.9%	0.0%

Results of Referendum 74 (2012) by county: Yes 70–80% 60–70% 50–60% / No 70–80% 60–70% 50–60%

Opponents of the legalization of same-sex marriage delayed the bill's implementation by collecting the signatures necessary to put the measure to a popular vote on November 6, 2012, as Referendum 74. (Note: Voters were asked: "The legislature passed Engrossed Substitute Senate Bill 6239 concerning marriage for same-sex couples, modified domestic-partnership law, and religious freedom, and voters have filed a sufficient referendum petition on this bill. This bill would allow same-sex couples to marry, preserve domestic partnerships only for seniors, and preserve the right of clergy or religious organizations to refuse to perform, recognize, or accommodate any marriage ceremony. Should this bill be: Approved [ ] or Rejected [ ]?") In that referendum, voters approved the law by a 54–46 percent margin. The law took effect on December 6. Because Washington requires a three-day waiting period (excluding the day of issue) before a marriage license may be signed, the first same-sex marriages in the state took place on December 9, 2012. Among the first couples to obtain marriage licenses were Lisa Brodoff and Lynn Grotsky in Olympia, the state capital, early on Thursday morning, December 6. In Seattle, about 150 same-sex couples lined up outside Seattle City Hall shortly before midnight, "waiting in a festive atmosphere for the doors to open" to obtain marriage licenses. Jane Abbott Lighty and Pete-e Petersen were the first couple to obtain a license in King County.

The definition of marriage in the state of Washington is now the following:

Marriage is a civil contract between two persons who have each attained the age of eighteen years, and who are otherwise capable. [RCW 26.04.010(1)]

=== Developments after legalization ===
Three years after Referendum 74, the U.S. Supreme Court legalized same-sex marriage nationwide with its Obergefell v. Hodges ruling on June 26, 2015. State Senator Jamie Pedersen welcomed the decision, "There's a great sense of peace that this is finally over after all these years. [...] There's a lot more work to do both here in our state and even more nationally. We know a hugely disproportionate number of homeless youth are LGBT." Mayor of Seattle Ed Murray said "[he had] never imagined this day", while Tom Rasmussen, a member of the Seattle City Council, said, "This day is a dream. It seems like an impossible dream."

In 2024, while running for governor, Dave Reichert told a group of Republicans that, "Let me make this very clear. I will not take any steps as Governor to restrict same-sex marriage. Every individual has the right to decide who they choose to marry. People have free will—it's their body, their life, their belief system." However, when answering questions from the audience, he said, "Number one, my wife is a woman and I am a man. You're a woman and I'm a man. There's only man and woman. I was raised with that as a Christian. And marriage is between a man and a woman." Reichert was defeated in the election by Democratic candidate Bob Ferguson.

=== Native American nations ===
The Indian Civil Rights Act primarily aims to protect the rights of Native Americans but also reinforces the principle of tribal self-governance. While it does not grant sovereignty, the Act affirms the authority of tribes to govern their own legal affairs. Consequently, many tribes have enacted their own marriage and family laws. As a result, the 2012 state law and the Supreme Court's Obergefell ruling did not automatically apply to tribal jurisdictions. Same-sex marriage is legal on the reservations of the Confederated Tribes of the Colville Reservation, whose Tribal Council voted unanimously to legalize same-sex marriage in September 2013, the Lummi Nation, the Port Gamble S'Klallam Tribe, the Puyallup Tribe of Indians, (Note: The Domestic Relations Code of the Puyallup Tribe of Indians states that a "same sex marriage may be validly contracted within the Puyallup Indian Reservation either by following the laws of the State of Washington or by meeting the requirements herein: (a) One of the persons who wishes to marry must be a member of the Puyallup Tribe of Indians; and (b) Must be 18 years of age or older; and (c) Must obtain and sign a certificate of marriage in front of witnesses.") whose Tribal Council voted unanimously to legalize in July 2014, the Suquamish Indian Tribe, which was the first tribe to do so in August 2011, and the Tulalip Tribes of Washington. The Tulalip Board of Directors amended its Tribal Code on May 6, 2016 to state: "'Marriage' means the legal union of two persons, regardless of their sex, created to the exclusion of all others." The Port Gamble S'Klallam Tribe announced in the wake of Referendum 74 in December 2012 that they would allow same-sex couples to marry on their reservation, including at the Heronswood Botanical Gardens in Kingston. The Domestic Relations Code (North Straits Salish: Schaʼche Sqaw) of the Lummi Nation was amended in 2022 to define marriage as "a civil contract which may be entered into by two persons who reach the age of eighteen (18) years." Some tribal codes use gender-neutral language with regard to whom may marry, including the Skokomish Indian Tribe and the Cowlitz Indian Tribe; (Note: The Skokomish Codes and Ordinances and the Tribal Code of the Cowlitz Indian Tribe do not explicitly ban same-sex marriage or define marriage as being exclusively between "a man and a woman" (Twana: čəʔwašəwə).) however, it is unclear if same-sex marriage is explicitly allowed on their reservations.

Native Americans have deep-rooted marriage traditions, placing a strong emphasis on community, family and spiritual connections. While there are no records of same-sex marriages being performed in Native American cultures in the way they are commonly defined in Western legal systems, many Indigenous communities recognize identities and relationships that may be placed on the LGBT spectrum. Among these are two-spirit individuals—people who embody both masculine and feminine qualities. In some cultures, two-spirit individuals assigned male at birth wear women's clothing and engage in household and artistic work associated with the feminine sphere. Historically, this identity sometimes allowed for unions between two people of the same biological sex. The Sahaptin refer to two-spirit individuals as wáƛ̓uks (pronounced [wátɬʼuks]). Other nations also have distinct terms and respected roles for two-spirit people. The Quileute, who live in the present-day Quileute Indian Reservation in La Push, refer to them as yá·x̣ʷa, the Syilx as st̓ámyaʔ (pronounced [ˈstʼamjaʔ]), the Upper Skagit as saliʔib (meaning "like two"), and the Klallam as slapúʔnə. In the Cowlitz language, the phrase yə́pɬ ʔaɬ t tamíwali t síɬmx refers to a gay man, while yə́pɬ ʔaɬ t tamíwali c kə́wɬ refers to a lesbian.

=== Economic impact ===
In 2006, a study from the University of California, Los Angeles estimated the impact of allowing same-sex couples to marry on Washington's state budget. The study concluded that allowing same-sex couples to marry would result in a net gain of approximately $3.9 million to $5.7 million each year for the state. This net impact would result from savings in state expenditures on means-tested public benefits programs and from an increase in sales tax revenue from weddings and wedding-related tourism.

=== Marriage statistics ===
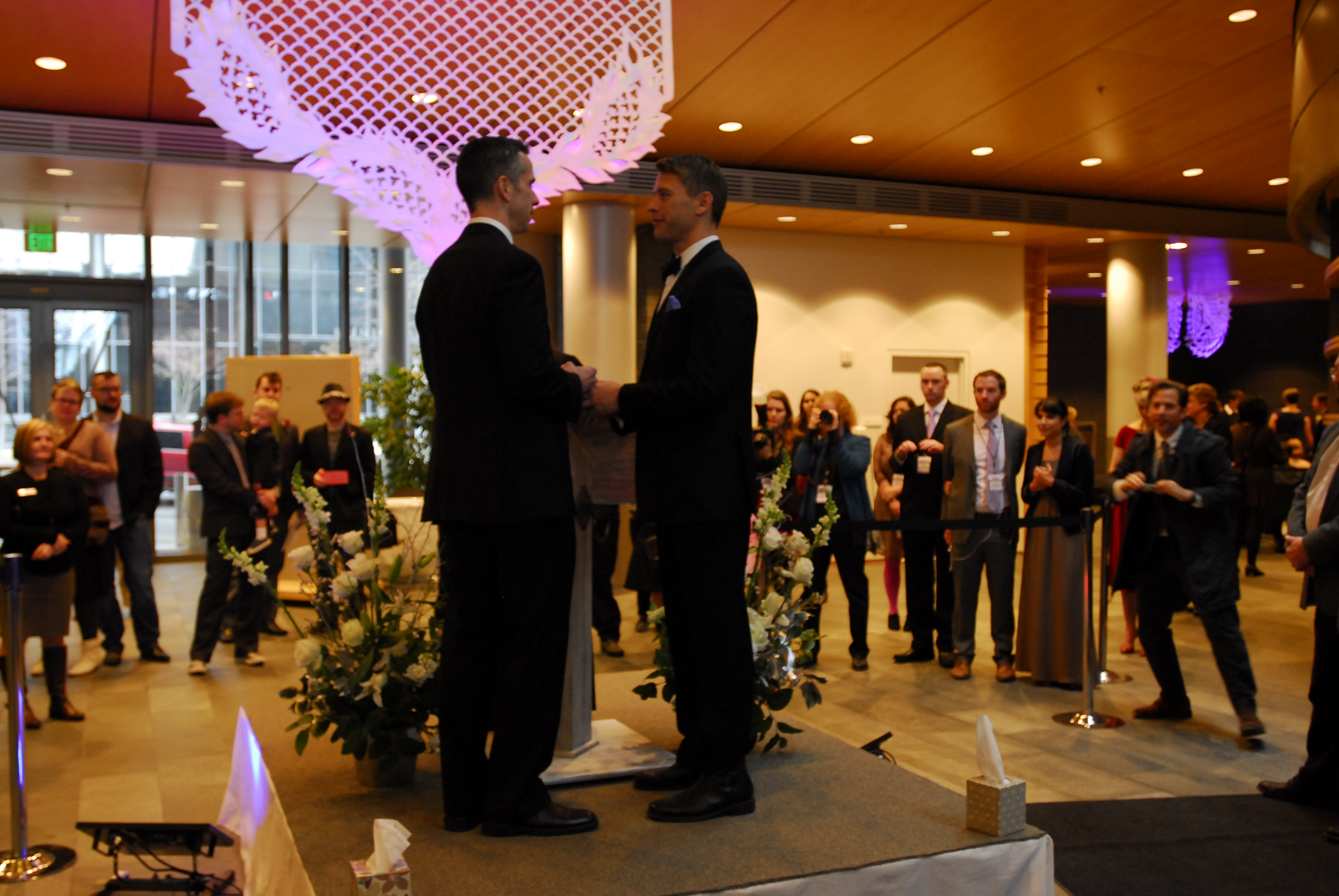
Two men marrying in Seattle on December 9, 2012, the first day in which the possibility to marry was opened to same-sex couples

By September 2013, nine months after legalization, 7,071 same-sex couples had legally married in the state, 3,452 of them in highly populated King County. Same-sex marriages accounted for 17% of all marriages, and 62% of those were between women. By December 31, 2015, approximately 15,750 same-sex marriages had been performed in Washington, a significant proportion of which occurred in the first 12 months of legalisation. 2,091 same-sex marriages were performed in 2016, 1,915 in 2017, 1,884 in 2018, 1,690 in 2019, and 1,747 in 2020, with most being between lesbian couples. These figures do not include conversions from domestic partnerships.

Between 2012 and 2016, most same-sex marriages were performed in King County (8,144), followed by Clark (2,170), Pierce (1,466), Snohomish (903), Spokane (759), Thurston (695), Kitsap (572), Whatcom (378), Island (326), Benton (216), Skagit (207), San Juan (174), Yakima (169), Jefferson (157), Clallam (152), Chelan (145), Grays Harbor (137), Mason (129), Cowlitz (124), Skamania (106), Walla Walla (95), Lewis (88), Kittitas (70), Klickitat (67), Pacific (64), Whitman (61), Grant (52), Franklin (47), Okanogan (43), Asotin (30), Stevens (29), Pend Oreille (19), Columbia (15) and Douglas (15), Lincoln (9), Wahkiakum (7), Adams (5), Ferry (3), and Garfield (2) counties.

The 2020 U.S. census showed that there were 21,659 married same-sex couple households (9,825 male couples and 11,834 female couples) and 13,693 unmarried same-sex couple households in Washington.

== Public opinion ==
Public opinion for same-sex marriage in Washington
Poll source	Dates administered	Sample size	Margin of error	Support	Opposition	Do not know / refused
Public Religion Research Institute	February 28 – December 8, 2025	504 adults	?	78%	19%	3%
Public Religion Research Institute	March 13 – December 2, 2024	542 adults	?	76%	18%	6%
Public Religion Research Institute	March 9 – December 7, 2023	517 adults	?	78%	20%	2%
Public Religion Research Institute	March 11 – December 14, 2022	?	?	83%	15%	2%
Public Religion Research Institute	March 8 – November 9, 2021	?	?	82%	16%	2%
Public Religion Research Institute	January 7 – December 20, 2020	1,310 adults	?	72%	22%	6%
Public Religion Research Institute	April 5 – December 23, 2017	1,762 adults	?	73%	21%	6%
Public Religion Research Institute	May 18, 2016 – January 10, 2017	2,264 adults	?	64%	26%	10%
Public Religion Research Institute	April 29, 2015 – January 7, 2016	1,923 adults	?	65%	28%	7%
Public Policy Polling	May 14–17, 2015	879 registered voters	± 3.3%	56%	36%	8%
Public Religion Research Institute	April 2, 2014 – January 4, 2015	1,133 adults	?	63%	29%	8%
Public Policy Polling	November 1–3, 2012	932 likely voters	± 3.2%	54%	40%	6%
Public Policy Polling	June 14–17, 2012	932 voters	± 3.2%	51%	42%	7%
Public Policy Polling	February 16–19, 2012	1,264 voters	± 2.8%	49%	44%	7%
University of Washington	October 10–30, 2011	938 registered voters	± 3.2%	43%	54%	3%
Public Policy Polling	May 12–15, 2011	1,098 voters	± 3.0%	46%	44%	10%

Various polls have been commissioned by participants in the same-sex marriage debate. The poll results reflect different question wording and sampling. The October 2011 University of Washington poll found that 55% of Washington voters would vote to uphold a legislatively approved same-sex marriage bill if it were put to a referendum, while 38% would oppose it and 7% were undecided. A separate question on the same survey found that 43% of respondents thought that gay and lesbian couples should have the same right to marry as straight couples, 22% thought that gay and lesbian couples should have the same rights as straight couples without the word "marriage", 15% thought that gay and lesbian couples should have domestic partnerships with only some of the rights of marriage, while 17% opposed all legal recognition, and 3% did not know. The February 2012 Public Policy Polling (PPP) survey found that 50% of Washington voters would vote to uphold a same-sex marriage law, while 46% would vote to repeal it and 4% were not sure. In addition, 32% believed that same-sex couples should be allowed to enter civil unions but not marriage and 20% were opposed to all legal recognition of same-sex relationships.

According to the Public Religion Research Institute (PRRI) survey conducted between March 11 and December 14, 2022, 83% of Washington respondents supported same-sex marriage, while 15% were opposed. This was the highest level of support recorded in the country, tied with Massachusetts (83%), and followed by New Hampshire (82%), Connecticut (81%), and Rhode Island (80%).

== See also ==
- LGBT rights in Washington (state)
- Domestic partnership in Washington state
- History of the LGBT community in Seattle
- Law of Washington (state)
- Washington United for Marriage
