= Borelli v. Brusseau =

- Court: California Courts of Appeal
- Full case name: Hildegard Lee Borelli, Plaintiff and Appellant, v. Grace G. Brusseau
- Decided: January 19, 1993

Case history
- Prior actions: Superior Court of Contra Costa County, No. C91- 03356

Court membership
- Judges sitting: James F. Perley, Carl West Anderson, Marcel B. Poche

Case opinions
- judgement affirmed
- Decision by: James F. Perley
- Concurrence: Carl West Anderson
- Dissent: Marcel B. Poche

Brusseau v. Borelli, 12 Cal. App. 4th 647, 16 Cal. Rptr. 2d 16, was a California Superior Court Case from 1992 involving the enforcement of a contract.

== Background ==
Borelli was the wife to an ill and dying man. They had a prenuptial agreement, but when the man fell into a worse state of sickness he agreed give more of his estate directly to his wife. After a stroke, he refused to be put in a hospital or special facility. His wife agreed to take care of him at home if he would agree to give her the title to certain real property. Shortly after, he died without making a change to his will. Brusseau, the executor of his will, refused to give Borelli the property she claimed. Borelli brought a legal suit against Brusseau and demanded that the court mandate him to bequeath the estate, but was ruled against. She subsequently appealed.

== Case ==
The court considered if such a contract, one spouse helping another in time of illness in exchange for title to property, violated public law. The court determined that spouses have an automatic duty to care for each other in times of illness, without need of special contracts. They believed that a spousal agreement that mandated such an arrangement would be contrary to public policy. Borelli claimed that if it were not for the agreement she would have likely left him in his illness.

There was a minority dissenting opinion of the court that believed that spouses did not have such duty of care and should be allowed to enter into contracts as if they were not spouses.

== Decision ==
The court ruled that the contract in question did violate public policy and was therefore unenforceable. Brusseau was not compelled to transfer title of the property to Borelli.

== Importance ==
Spouses cannot enter into similar contracts like so since, as spouses, they already have certain duties to each other. Such contracts violate public law on marriage contracts. In order for title of property to properly pass from one spouse to another in similar situations, it must be expressly written into a will or other document stating intent.
