= Rights and responsibilities of marriages in the United States =

According to the United States Government Accountability Office (GAO), there are 1,138 statutory provisions in which marital status is a factor in determining benefits, rights, and privileges. These rights were a key issue in the debate over federal recognition of same-sex marriage. Under the 1996 Defense of Marriage Act (DOMA), the federal government was prohibited from recognizing same-sex couples who were lawfully married under the laws of their state. The conflict between this definition and the Due Process Clause of the Fifth Amendment to the Constitution led the U.S. Supreme Court to rule DOMA unconstitutional on June 26, 2013, in the case of United States v. Windsor. DOMA was finally repealed and replaced by the Respect for Marriage Act on December 13, 2022, which retains the same statutory provisions as DOMA and extends them to interracial and same-sex married couples.

Prior to the enactment of DOMA, the GAO identified 1,049 federal statutory provisions in which benefits, rights, and privileges are contingent on marital status or in which marital status is a factor. An update was published in 2004 by the GAO covering the period between September 21, 1996 (when DOMA was signed into law), and December 31, 2003. The update identified 120 new statutory provisions involving marital status, and 31 statutory provisions involving marital status repealed or amended in such a way as to eliminate marital status as a factor.

The first legally-recognized same-sex marriage occurred in Minneapolis, Minnesota, in 1971. On June 26, 2015, in the case of Obergefell v. Hodges, the Supreme Court overturned Baker v. Nelson and ruled that marriage is a fundamental right guaranteed to all citizens, and thus legalized same-sex marriage nationwide.

== Rights and benefits ==
- Right to benefits while married:
  - Employment assistance and transitional services for spouses of members being separated from military service; continued commissary privileges
  - Per diem payment to spouse for federal civil service employees when relocating
  - Indian Health Service care for spouses of Native Americans (in some circumstances)
  - Sponsor husband/wife for immigration benefits
- Larger benefits under some programs if married, including:
  - Veteran's disability
  - Supplemental Security Income
  - Disability payments for federal employees
  - Medicaid
  - Property tax exemption for homes of totally disabled veterans
  - Income tax deductions, credits, rates exemption, and estimates
  - Wages of an employee working for one's spouse are exempt from federal unemployment tax
- Joint and family-related rights:
  - Joint filing of bankruptcy permitted
  - Joint parenting rights, such as access to children's school records
  - Family visitation rights for the spouse and non-biological children, such as to visit a spouse in a hospital or prison
  - Next-of-kin status for emergency medical decisions or filing wrongful death claims
  - Custodial rights to children, shared property, child support, and alimony after divorce
  - Domestic violence intervention
  - Access to "family only" services, such as reduced rate memberships to clubs & organizations or residency in certain neighborhoods
- Preferential hiring for spouses of veterans in government jobs
- Tax-free transfer of property between spouses (including on death) and exemption from "due-on-sale" clauses.
- Special consideration to spouses of citizens and resident aliens
- Threats against spouses of various federal employees is a federal crime
- Right to continue living on land purchased from spouse by National Park Service when easement granted to spouse
- Court notice of probate proceedings
- Domestic violence protection orders
- Existing homestead lease continuation of rights
- Regulation of condominium sales to owner-occupants exemption
- Funeral and bereavement leave
- Joint adoption and foster care
- Joint filing of taxes (see filing status)
- Insurance licenses, coverage, eligibility, and benefits organization of mutual benefits society
- Legal status with stepchildren
- Making spousal medical decisions
- Spousal non-resident tuition differential waiver
- Permission to make funeral arrangements for a deceased spouse, including burial or cremation
- Right of survivorship of custodial trust
- Right to change surname upon marriage
- Right to enter into prenuptial agreement
- Right to inheritance of property
- Spousal privilege in court cases (the marital confidences privilege and the spousal testimonial privilege)
- For those divorced or widowed, the right to many of ex- or late spouse's benefits, including:
  - Social Security pension
  - Veteran's pensions, indemnity compensation for service-connected deaths, medical care, and nursing home care, right to burial in veterans' cemeteries, educational assistance, and housing
  - survivor benefits for federal employees
  - Survivor benefits for spouses of longshoremen, harbor workers, railroad workers
  - Additional benefits to spouses of coal miners who die of black lung disease
  - $100,000 to spouse of any public safety officer killed in the line of duty
  - Continuation of employer-sponsored health benefits
  - Renewal and termination rights to spouse's copyrights on death of spouse
  - Continued water rights of spouse in some circumstances
  - Payment of wages and workers compensation benefits after worker death
  - Making, revoking, and objecting to post-mortem anatomical gifts

== Responsibilities ==
- Spousal income and assets are counted in determining need in many forms of government assistance, including:
  - Veteran's medical and home care benefits
  - Housing assistance
  - Housing loans for veterans
  - Child's education loans
  - Educational loan repayment schedule
  - Agricultural price supports and loans
  - Eligibility for federal matching campaign funds
- Ineligible for National Affordable Housing program if spouse ever purchased a home:
- Subject to conflict-of-interest rules for many government and government-related jobs
- Ineligible to receive various survivor benefits upon remarriage
- Providing financial support for raising children born of the marriage

== Ambiguous ==
There are some laws that either benefit or penalize married couples over single people, depending upon their own circumstances:

- Marriage penalty/bonus
- Changing beneficiaries in a retirement plan or waiving the joint and survivor annuity form of retirement benefit requires written spousal consent
- Wages can be garnished at a maximum of 60% (instead of the normal 25% limit) if the garnishing is for alimony or child support

== States ==
In addition, community-property states frequently have forms of ownership that allow a full basis step-up on one's own share of community property on the death of a spouse (in addition to the normal step-up on spouse's assets).

== Legal remedies enacted following the GAO report ==
Following the 2004 GAO report at least one bill, the Uniting American Families Act, has been proposed to attempt to remedy some of the differences in rights between same-sex partnerships and marriages.

== See also ==
- Borelli v. Brusseau
- Community property
- Domestic partnership in the United States
- Respect for Marriage Act
- Federal Marriage Amendment
- Freedom to Marry
- LGBT rights
- Marriage Protection Act
- Rights and obligations of marriage
- Same-sex marriage in the United States
- Same-sex marriage in the United States by state
- Same-sex marriage in the United States public opinion
- Same-sex marriage legislation in the United States
- Same-sex marriage status in the United States by state
- U.S. state constitutional amendments banning same-sex unions
