= Domestic partnership in Washington (state) =

State-registered domestic partnerships (SRDP) in Washington were created in 2007 following the Andersen v. King County decision. Subsequent legislation made an SRDP the equivalent of marriage under state law. As a result of the legalization of same-sex marriage in the state, starting on June 30, 2014, SRDPs became available only when at least one of the partners was sixty-two years of age or older.

== History of Washington domestic partnerships ==
=== Beginnings ===
In its Andersen v. King County decision, the Washington Supreme Court noted the Legislature was free to revisit any law it had previously enacted. Lacking sufficient votes to change the marriage laws, the Legislature worked to pass a domestic partnership law. After much debate, lawmakers approved a bill on April 10, 2007. conferring eleven of the rights of marriage to same-sex couples and opposite-sex couples (when at least one of the individuals is over the age of 62). Governor Christine Gregoire signed the bill April 21, 2007, and the law took effect on July 22, 2007.

The first partnerships were registered July 23, 2007, the first business day after the law's effective date. More than 100 couples registered on the first day — some showing up as early as 4 a.m.

=== Expansion ===
Similar to California's incremental approach with its domestic partnership laws, the Washington Legislature has expanded the scope of partnerships. On March 4, 2008, lawmakers approved adding over 170 rights and responsibilities to domestic partnerships. The bill was signed by Governor Gregoire on March 12, 2008. Washington domestic partners do not need to re-register to take advantage of the new benefits. Because of the significant changes in 2008, the Secretary of State's office mailed a letter to the last known address of each SRDP informing them of the changes. The new law became effective on June 12, 2008.

Lawmakers backing the domestic partnership legislation were open in stating that their ultimate intent was to expand marriage laws to include same-sex couples and that they saw the creation and expansion of domestic partnerships as steps toward that goal. To that end, civil marriage equality bills were also introduced to encourage discussion.

== 2009 ==
=== "Everything but marriage" ===
Like California, lawmakers continued to extend the rights and responsibilities of domestic partners. Legislation introduced on January 28, 2009, intended to provide "everything but marriage" to domestic partners. Senate Bill 5688 would amend many state laws and place domestic partnership on an equal footing with civil marriage. Despite the attempts to provide equal benefits to domestic partners, the law does not change Washington's restriction against same-sex marriages.

"Although we view this as an improvement that provides real and concrete protections to same-sex partners, it's an inadequate substitute for marriage," said Representative Jamie Pedersen, the House sponsor of the bill.

The legislation cleared the Senate on March 10, 2009, and the House on April 15, 2009. Governor Gregoire signed it into law on May 18, 2009.

=== Referendum 71 ===
The legislation was meant to come into force on July 26, 2009, but Referendum 71 was filed seeking to overturn the expansion. At the last possible moment, opponents submitted enough signatures to postpone the law and force a popular vote on the new law.

Groups such as Equal Rights Washington and Washington Families Standing Together urged voters to uphold the law providing for domestic partnerships, while Protect Marriage Washington was the main group in opposition.

Washington's voters approved the law 53.15% to 46.85% — this marked the first time in the United States that voters had approved a statewide ballot measure that extended LGBT relationship rights. The law went into effect the day the election was certified, December 3, 2009.

== 2012 ==
Senate Bill 6239 was introduced on January 16, 2012, and amended RCW 26 "Domestic relations". In addition to legalizing same-sex marriage this modifies RCW 26.60 "State registered domestic partnerships" to convert any undissolved same-sex domestic partnership that does not involve at least one member aged 62 years or older into a marriage on June 30, 2014. SB 6239 passed the Senate by a vote of 28–21 on February 1, 2012. HB 2516 passed the House of Representatives on February 8 by a vote of 55–43. Governor Christine Gregoire signed the engrossed bill into law on February 13. The law was scheduled to take effect in June 2012, but was challenged by Referendum 74. Voters approved that referendum legalizing same-sex marriage on November 6, 2012. The law also provides that Washington's registered domestic partnerships will convert automatically to marriages on June 30, 2014, if not dissolved before that date. Under RCW 26.60.100 (4), the marriage celebration or automatic conversion from domestic partnership to marriage is deemed as legally effective on the date of the original domestic partnership registration: "For purposes of determining the legal rights and responsibilities involving individuals who had previously had a state registered domestic partnership and have been issued a marriage license or are deemed married under the provisions of this section, the date of the original state registered domestic partnership is the legal date of the marriage."

== Rights and responsibilities ==
=== Original laws ===
After 2008's expanded domestic partnership law took effect, some of the domestic partner's benefits and responsibilities include:

- Visitation, health care decision-making, and information-access rights
- Inheritance and administration rights
- Burial, disposition, organ donation, autopsy, and wrongful death claim rights
- A domestic partner has testimonial privileges in court
- Community property and dissolution laws apply
- Domestic partners may sue on behalf of the community
- Domestic violence statutes apply
- Certain property transfers between partners are not taxed
- State veterans benefits apply
- Appointed and elected officials' partners subjected to same laws as married officials' spouses

=== Post-Referendum 71 ===
Under state law, domestic partners shall be treated the same as married spouses. Some of the more notable changes include:

- Use of sick leave to care for a domestic partner
- Rights to injured partners' wages and benefits and unpaid wages upon death of a partner
- Access to unemployment, disability insurance, and workers' compensation coverage
- Access to insurance continuance rights after the death of a domestic partner
- Rights related to adoption, child custody and child support
- Business succession rights

== Registration ==
Domestic partnerships are issued by the Secretary of State's Corporations Division in Olympia. Couples can register in person or by mail. Couples wishing to enter into an SRDP are required to fill out an application, have it notarized, and pay the filing fee. Once the application is received, the Secretary of State's office will issue a certificate and a wallet card for each individual.

Registrations are public records – information can be searched on the Secretary of State's domestic partnership page.

Because an SRDP may be less familiar than marriage to some, the wallet cards or online verification can be used to prove a partner's relationship, especially during an emergency.

== See also ==
- Same-sex marriage in Washington State
- LGBT rights in Washington State
- Law of Washington (state)
- Same-sex marriage in the United States
- Civil union in the United States
- Domestic partnership in the United States
