= 2009 Washington Referendum 71 =

LGBTQ rights referendum

Referendum 71
- Concerns the legal status of domestic partnerships of LGBT people

Results
Choice	Votes	%
Yes	951,822	53.15%
No	838,842	46.85%
Total votes	1,790,664	100.00%
County results
Yes:
50–60%
60–70%
70–80%
No:
50–60%
60–70%
70–80%

The 2009 Washington Referendum 71 (R-71) was a state referendum that legalized domestic partnership in Washington state, the first statewide referendum in the United States that extended to LGBT people the rights and responsibility of domestic partnership. The bill had passed State Legislature, and it was signed into law by the Governor in May 2009, but opponents gathered enough signatures to put the measure before the voters, who returned ballots by mail over three weeks ending on November 3, 2009, approving the measure 53% to 47%. The new law went into effect 30 days later, on December 3, 2009.

Prior to this Washington state vote, a ban on same-sex marriages and civil unions, Arizona Proposition 107, was rejected by voters in that state in 2006, who two years later passed the civil-unions-neutral Arizona Proposition 102.

== History ==
Senate Bill 5688 was signed by Governor Christine Gregoire on May 18, 2009. On July 25, 2009, the organization Protect Marriage Washington submitted petitions containing 137,881 signatures to the Washington Secretary of State's office. State law requires at least 120,577 valid signatures to qualify for the October–November 2009 ballot. The Secretary of State officially verified 122,007 of the signatures on September 1, 2009.

Under the State Constitution, laws passed by the legislature do not take effect until ninety days after the close of the legislative session, unless the Legislature declares an emergency, which would put the law in effect immediately. During this ninety-day period citizens can attempt to force a referendum by gathering enough verified signatures, at least four percent of the number of voters in the previous gubernatorial election. A successful petition places the law on hold, pending a referendum in the next election.

Enactment of the Washington Legislature-approved law was initially halted pending signature-verification; having received sufficient valid signatures to require voter re-confirmation, the state extended the hold until the results of the 2009 general election were made official.

Several lawsuits were filed to block R-71 from appearing on the ballot, but none was successful in court.

A second challenge to the ballot certification brought in Thurston County by Arthur West was dismissed upon the Secretary of State's misrepresentation of the scope of the federal injunction. A third challenge brought by WFST was dismissed by agreement without review of the signature sheets. There was an active lawsuit to be heard by the Supreme Court to decide if and when signatories to ballot measures are to be revealed publicly. Following the dissolution of the injunction on November 17, 2011, the Secretary of State first released some copies of the R-71 signatures, but then halted such releases pending a motion for a further injunction to be heard on November 24, 2011, in the United States Court of Appeals for the Ninth Circuit.

== Provisions of the law ==
The full title of the proposal approved in the referendum was Engrossed Second Substitute Senate Bill 5688. It was intended to make domestic partnership in Washington state equivalent to marriage, without being called by that name. For this reason it is sometimes referred to as the "everything but marriage bill". The law made many changes to the Revised Code. Its overall purpose is stated in Section 1:

It is the intent of the legislature that for all purposes under state law, state registered domestic partners shall be treated the same as married spouses ...The provisions of this act shall be liberally construed to achieve equal treatment, to the extent not in conflict with federal law, of state registered domestic partners and married spouses.

== Text of referendum ==
Legislation challenged by petition is put on the ballot with wording that asks voters to choose Approved or Rejected to either enact or strike down the law.

Ballot Title

Statement of Subject: The legislature passed Engrossed Second Substitute Senate Bill 5688 concerning rights and responsibilities of state-registered domestic partners [and voters have filed a sufficient referendum petition on this bill].

Concise Description: This bill would expand the rights, responsibilities, and obligations accorded state-registered same-sex and senior domestic partners to be equivalent to those of married spouses, except that a domestic partnership is not a marriage.

Should this bill be:

Approved ___
Rejected ___

Ballot Measure Summary

Same-sex couples, or any couple that includes one person age sixty-two or older, may register as a domestic partnership with the state. Registered domestic partnerships are not marriages, and marriage is prohibited except between one man and one woman. This bill would expand the rights, responsibilities, and obligations of registered domestic partners and their families to include all rights, responsibilities, and obligations granted by or imposed by state law on married couples and their families.

== Background ==
The proposal to overturn the bill was filed by Larry Stickney, president of the Washington Values Alliance, a group that opposes recognition of same-sex relationships. Organizations favoring the original legislation and opposing putting the issue up for referendum, such as Equal Rights Washington and Washington Families Standing Together, led the 'Decline to Sign' campaign, urging voters not to sign the petitions to put the referendum on the November 2009 ballot.

== Reaction to petition ==
Ed Murray, who sponsored the initial domestic partnership legislation in 2007 (Senate Bill 5336), stated:

While it's regrettable that a referendum is being filed to undo the progress we made this session to treat gay and lesbian families the same as married families, I don't believe that voters will decide in November to take away rights from anyone…

Governor Gregoire stated:

I respect the peoples' right to place a referendum on the ballot following legislative action. However, I am obviously very disappointed that this message will be debated once again. I signed the original bill and believe it should be and will be the law of our great state. Washington state has a history of fighting to ensure everyone – mothers, fathers, sons, daughters, brothers, sisters – enjoys equal rights.

Protect Marriage Washington argued, however, that the "consent of the governed" as per the Declaration of Independence has been withheld from same sex marriage in every state where the issue has been put to a vote of the people. It has been noted that Referendum 71 is about Domestic Partnerships and does not grant marriage equality to same sex couples.

== Polls ==
A 2007 University of Washington poll found 73% of Washington voters support some legal recognition of same-sex relationships (civil union/domestic partnership or marriage). The same group in October 2009 conducted a poll (N = 754 registered voters) and found that 56% of respondents planned to vote 'approve', and 39% planned to vote 'reject.'

A 2009 Elway Poll commissioned by the Faith and Freedom Network, an organization opposed to gay marriage, asked "Should homosexuals be allowed to legally marry?" The Elway Poll (N = 405 registered voters) reported 43% saying yes and 50% saying no.

A September 2009 poll (N = 569 likely voters) commissioned by the Approve 71 campaign and conducted by Greenberg Quinlan Rosner (GQR) found that, when presented with the actual Referendum's language, 51% of likely voters chose to approve and 44% to reject the legislation. A later GQR poll (N = 500 likely voters) released on October 26, 2009, found that the 53% approved the legislation, while 36% rejected it.

An October 2009 poll by Survey USA, funded by KING-TV in Seattle showed that 50% of the 561 likely voters polled would vote for the measure while 43% would reject it, 7% unsure.

== Results ==
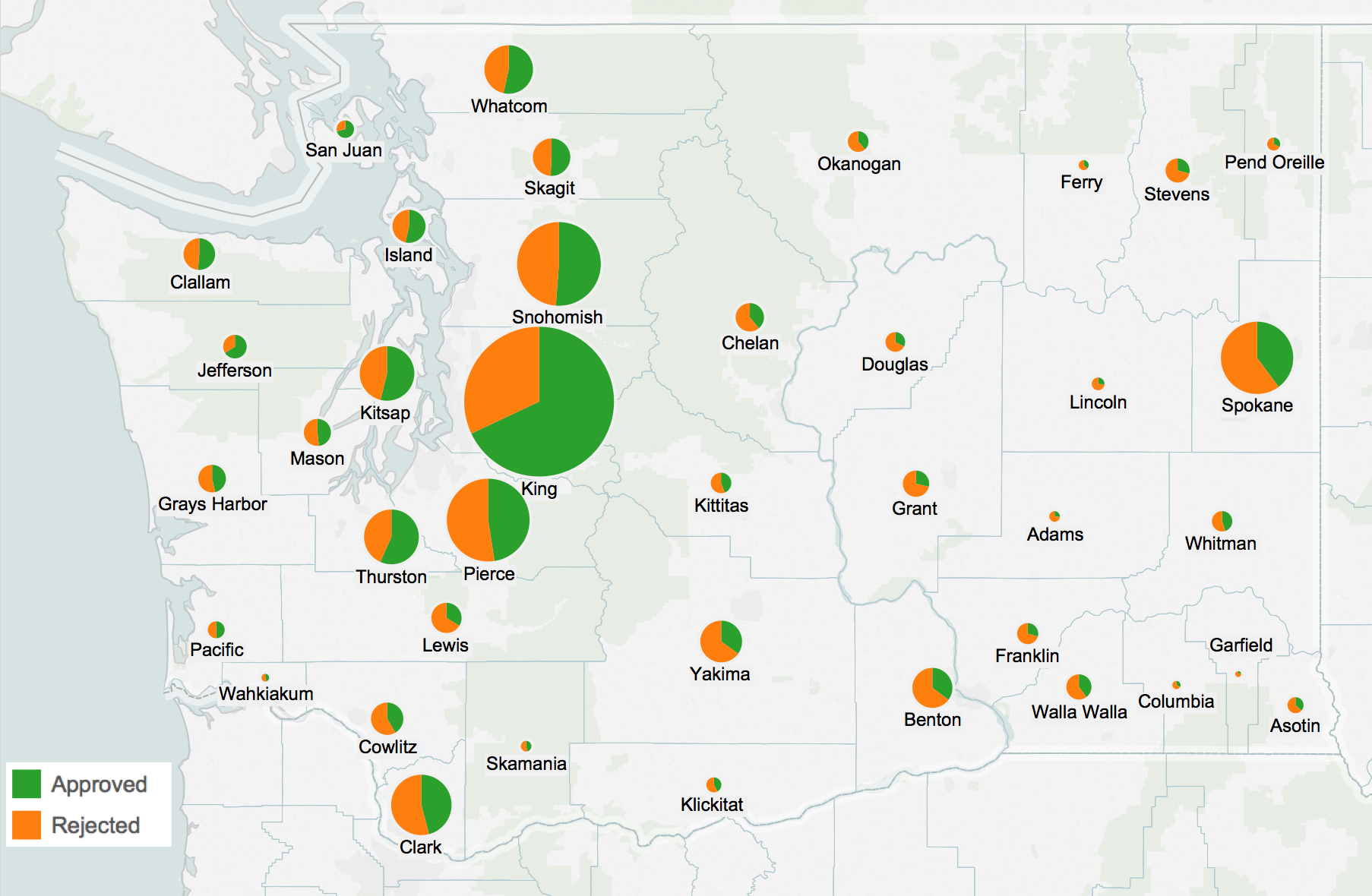
Referendum 71 results by county, with number of votes shown by size, Approved in green and Rejected in orange.

Referendum Measure 71 concerning rights and responsibilities of state-registered domestic partners
Choice	Votes	%
For	951,822	53.15
Against	838,842	46.85
Total	1,790,664	100.00
Registered voters/turnout		50.88

=== By county ===
County results
County	Yes		No		Margin		Total votes
County	#	%	#	%	#	%	Total votes
Adams	763	26.66%	2,099	73.34%	-1,336	-46.68%	2,862
Asotin	2,372	36.52%	4,123	63.48%	-1,751	-26.96%	6,495
Benton	14,180	35.12%	26,195	64.88%	-12,015	-29.76%	40,375
Chelan	7,938	39.07%	12,380	60.93%	-4,442	-21.86%	20,318
Clallam	12,949	51.35%	12,270	48.65%	679	2.69%	25,219
Clark	42,256	45.93%	49,736	54.07%	-7,480	-8.13%	91,992
Columbia	572	33.16%	1,153	66.84%	-581	-33.68%	1,725
Cowlitz	10,955	41.58%	15,389	58.42%	-4,434	-16.83%	26,344
Douglas	3,222	32.88%	6,576	67.12%	-3,354	-34.23%	9,798
Ferry	928	36.90%	1,587	63.10%	-659	-26.20%	2,515
Franklin	3,301	29.51%	7,886	70.49%	-4,585	-40.99%	11,187
Garfield	205	22.68%	699	77.32%	-494	-54.65%	904
Grant	5,028	28.76%	12,454	71.24%	-7,426	-42.48%	17,482
Grays Harbor	8,941	46.50%	10,285	53.50%	-1,344	-6.99%	19,226
Island	14,741	53.44%	12,844	46.56%	1,897	6.88%	27,585
Jefferson	9,280	66.03%	4,775	33.97%	4,505	32.05%	14,055
King	384,042	67.99%	180,821	32.01%	203,221	35.98%	564,863
Kitsap	40,400	53.81%	34,678	46.19%	5,722	7.62%	75,078
Kittitas	4,709	44.31%	5,918	55.69%	-1,209	-11.38%	10,627
Klickitat	2,391	41.89%	3,317	58.11%	-926	-16.22%	5,708
Lewis	7,801	33.81%	15,273	66.19%	-7,472	-32.38%	23,074
Lincoln	1,073	26.45%	2,984	73.55%	-1,911	-47.10%	4,057
Mason	8,923	48.19%	9,592	51.81%	-669	-3.61%	18,515
Okanogan	4,147	38.46%	6,637	61.54%	-2,490	-23.09%	10,784
Pacific	3,571	49.56%	3,634	50.44%	-63	-0.87%	7,205
Pend Oreille	1,367	32.05%	2,898	67.95%	-1,531	-35.90%	4,265
Pierce	82,189	47.57%	90,584	52.43%	-8,395	-4.86%	172,773
San Juan	5,468	70.98%	2,236	29.02%	3,232	41.95%	7,704
Skagit	17,969	50.83%	17,379	49.17%	590	1.67%	35,348
Skamania	1,311	46.11%	1,532	53.89%	-221	-7.77%	2,843
Snohomish	90,340	51.20%	86,107	48.80%	4,233	2.40%	176,447
Spokane	52,551	39.85%	79,314	60.15%	-26,763	-20.30%	131,865
Stevens	4,282	29.19%	10,387	70.81%	-6,105	-41.62%	14,669
Thurston	42,807	56.67%	32,732	43.33%	10,075	13.34%	75,539
Wahkiakum	668	44.86%	821	55.14%	-153	-10.28%	1,489
Walla Walla	6,394	39.90%	9,633	60.10%	-3,239	-20.21%	16,027
Whatcom	31,720	53.47%	27,598	46.53%	4,122	6.95%	59,318
Whitman	4,738	45.06%	5,776	54.94%	-1,038	-9.87%	10,514
Yakima	15,330	34.94%	28,540	65.06%	-13,210	-30.11%	43,870
Totals	951,822	53.15%	838,842	46.85%	112,980	6.31%	1,790,664

== Endorsers of Referendum 71 ==
=== Endorsing a vote of "approve" ===
- Governor Christine Gregoire
- U.S. Senators Patty Murray and Maria Cantwell
- U.S. Representatives Jay Inslee, Rick Larsen, and Jim McDermott
- 17 of 49 state senators
- 46 of 98 state representatives
- Microsoft
- Boeing
- Google
- Nike, Inc.
- Puget Sound Energy
- RealNetworks
- Vulcan Inc.
- Washington State Democratic Party
- Washington Association of Churches
- League of Women Voters of Washington
- Mainstream Republicans of Washington
- Washington State Council of Firefighters
- Washington State Nurses Association
- Children's Alliance
- Washington State Bar Association
- Washington State Senior Citizens Lobby
- NAACP, King County Chapter
- over 260 other organizations

Newspapers:

- The Columbian
- Everett Herald
- The News Tribune
- The Olympian
- The Oregonian
- The Seattle Times
- Skagit Valley Herald
- The Spokesman-Review
- The Stranger
- Walla Walla Union-Bulletin

=== Endorsing a vote of "reject" ===
- Washington Values Alliance - Larry Stickney
- Washington State Republican Party
- Washington Eagle Forum - Cindy Honcoop
- Pastor Ken Hutcherson, Antioch Bible Church
- Faith and Freedom Network - Gary Randall
- Christian Coalition of Washington - Rick Forcier
- YWAM & US Renewal - Ron Boehme
- Family Policy Institute of Washington
- Facts for Freedom - Jim Galbraith
- Washington Opposed to Pro-Homosexual Policies, Pastor Gary & Annetta Small
- Concerned Citizens of Pierce County - Pat Burgess
- The Reagan Wing - Doug Parris
- Constitution Party of Washington State
- Concerned Women for America (Washington)
- Spokane American Family Association - Wayne Lawson
- Knights of Columbus, Bremerton Council
- Washington State Catholic Conference.

== Signature release controversy ==
The Washington State Constitution establishes the required number of signatures for ballot measures. Referendum sponsors must submit a number of signatures at least equal to 4% of the votes cast for the office of governor in the most recent gubernatorial election in the state. The state contends that the papers on which these submitted signatures are collected are typically a matter of public record, claims that signing a petition for a referendum or initiative that qualifies for a ballot is a legislative act, and thus argues that voters are entitled to know who is behind such measures.

Some individuals and a group called WhoSigned.org requested these signatures for the Referendum 71 ballot application. Protect Marriage Washington filed to block the release of these signatures, arguing that, "due to the highly charged nature of the topic of Referendum 71, (domestic partnerships, gay rights, the traditional definition of marriage, etc.) that the personal information on the petitions for Referendum 71 warrant particular protection." The issue escalated to the U.S. Supreme Court where on October 19, 2009 Justice Kennedy issued a temporary block to the release of the names and then the following day the Court voted 8-1 (with John Paul Stevens being the lone dissenter) to withhold the signatures until the issue could receive a full hearing.

The Supreme Court heard full arguments in the case, Doe v. Reed, on April 28, 2010. The Supreme Court decision would likely set a precedent for public disclosure rules for all referendum and initiative petitions within all states which use those citizen procedures.

On June 24, 2010, the US Supreme Court rejected Protect Marriage Washington's claims in an 8–1 decision, with only Thomas dissenting. The court upheld the constitutionality of the Public Records Act under which the petition was requested. The question of whether to block release of the petition on narrower grounds was decided before the district court. Washington State's Office on Monday began making public the names of 137,500 people who signed Referendum 71 petitions two years ago to bring a domestic-partnership law to a public vote.

== Advertisements in popular culture ==
Satirist Stephen Colbert made light of one advertisement created by Protect Marriage Washington on The Colbert Report's October 26, 2009, show. The ad asserts that in May 2004, gay marriage was legalized in Scandinavia and coincided with a suicide rate doubling and an illegal drug use increasing nineteen-fold. Colbert went on to say the ad was "terrifying," adding, "and that ad is no less terrifying just because there is no country called Scandinavia, none of the countries in Scandinavia passed gay marriage laws in 2004, and the statistics on suicide and drug use are made up."

== See also ==
- Domestic partnership in Washington State
- Same-sex marriage in Washington State
- 2012 Washington Referendum 74
- 2012 Maine Question 1
