= Same-sex marriage in the District of Columbia =

Same-sex marriage has been legal in the District of Columbia since March 3, 2010. On December 18, 2009, Mayor Adrian Fenty signed a bill passed by the Council of the District of Columbia on December 15 legalizing same-sex marriage. Following the signing, the measure entered a mandatory congressional review of 30 work days. Marriage licenses became available on March 3, and marriages began on March 9, 2010. The District of Columbia was the first U.S. jurisdiction below the Mason–Dixon line and the sixth in the country, after Massachusetts, Connecticut, Iowa, Vermont and New Hampshire, to allow same-sex couples to marry. Polling suggests that an overwhelming majority of District residents support the legal recognition of same-sex marriage, with a 2021 Public Religion Research Institute survey showing that 86% of respondents supported same-sex marriage, the highest in the United States.

In addition to recognizing same-sex marriages, the District has also allowed residents to enter into registered domestic partnerships since 2002. Since the passage of the Domestic Partnership Judicial Determination of Parentage Act of 2009, it has recognized civil unions and domestic partnerships performed in other jurisdictions that grant all the rights and responsibilities of marriage. The law gives the mayor discretion to recognize relationships from states with lesser benefits.

== Domestic partnerships ==
Domestic partnerships in the District of Columbia are open to both same-sex and opposite-sex couples. One of the unusual features of the original bill establishing domestic partnerships was that it allowed partnerships to be created between people who were related by blood (e.g. siblings or a parent and adult child, provided both were single). All couples registered as domestic partners are entitled to the same rights as family members and spouses to visit their domestic partners in hospital and jail and to make decisions concerning the treatment of a domestic partner's remains and estate after the partner's death. The measure also grants a number of benefits to District government employees. Domestic partners are eligible for health insurance coverage, can use annual leave or unpaid leave for the birth or adoption of a dependent child or to care for a domestic partner or a partner's dependents, and can make funeral arrangements for a deceased partner.

The original bill establishing domestic partnerships in the District of Columbia is known as the Health Care Benefits Expansion Act of 1992. It was passed by the Council of the District of Columbia and signed into law by Mayor Sharon Pratt. The bill became law on June 11, 1992. Every year between 1992 and 2002, the Republican leadership of the U.S. Congress added a rider to the District of Columbia appropriations bill that prohibited the use of federal or local funds to implement the Act. The law was finally implemented in 2002, a fiscal year, after Congress failed to add the rider to the appropriations bill.

Since the 2002 implementation of domestic partnerships, the benefits attached to domestic partnerships have been expanded many times. In the Health Care Decisions Act of 2003, domestic partners were given the right to make health care decisions for their partners. The Deed Recordation Tax and Related Amendments Amendment Act of 2004 provided equal treatment for the purpose of paying the deed recordation tax. Expanding benefits further, the Department of Motor Vehicles Reform Amendment Act of 2004 exempted domestic partners from the excise tax payable for transfer of title to their partners, and the Domestic Partnership Protection Amendment Act of 2004 amended the definition of the term "marital status" in the Human Rights Act of 1997 to include domestic partners. The Domestic Partnership Equality Amendment Act of 2006, which came into effect on April 4, 2006, was a major expansion of the benefits of domestic partnerships. This act provided that in almost all cases domestic partners would enjoy the same rights as spouses regarding inheritance, probate, guardianship, and certain other rights traditionally accorded to spouses. The act also gave the right to form premarital agreements for prospective partners, and the right to not testify against their domestic partners in court. However, it did not extend most benefits of civil marriage to domestic partners, such as the marital estate tax deduction. At the time of this latest expansion coming into effect in April 2006, there were 587 registered couples.

Domestic partnership rights were once again incrementally expanded in March 2007 with the passage of the Domestic Partnerships Joint Filing Act of 2006, which granted the right to jointly file local taxes as domestic partners. On May 6, 2008, the Council passed the Omnibus Domestic Partnership Equality Amendment Act of 2008 by an unanimous vote, which according to the Washington Blade "provide[d] both rights and obligations for domestic partners in a total of 39 separate laws that touch on such areas as rental housing, condominiums, real estate transactions, nursing homes, life insurance, worker's compensation, investigations into child abuse and the police department's musical band, among other areas", thus "bringing the law to a point where same-sex couples who register as domestic partners will receive most, but not quite all, of the rights and benefits of marriage under District law". The Domestic Partnership Judicial Determination of Parentage Act 2009, signed into law on May 20, 2009, provided recognition of domestic partnerships conducted in other states and amended district laws on parentage entitlements and rights to children from domestic partnerships. The law became effective on July 20, 2009.

== Same-sex marriage ==
Same-sex marriage in the United States

=== Early lawsuits ===
On January 19, 1995, the District of Columbia Court of Appeals issued a ruling in Dean v. District of Columbia. In this case, Craig Robert Dean and Patrick Gerard Gill, a couple who met all of the District's requirements for a marriage license except for being of the same sex, sought an order to compel the District to issue them a marriage license. The court upheld a lower court decision denying them the license, finding that the District's marriage statute did not contemplate same-sex marriages despite being gender-neutral, that denying the license did not violate District law against discrimination based on sex or sexual orientation and that denying the license did not violate the Due Process Clause of the United States Constitution.

=== Recognition of out-of-state marriages ===
On April 7, 2009, the same day the Vermont General Assembly passed same-sex marriage legislation, the Council voted by an unanimous 12–0 vote to recognize same-sex marriages performed in other jurisdictions. The move was hailed as a possible gateway to the legalization of same-sex marriage in the near future. Under the District's procedures, the bill was voted on again on May 5, passing with a 12–1 vote. The act was signed by Mayor Adrian Fenty, and subject to a review period, which expired on July 7, 2009.

On June 13, the Board of Elections ruled that a petition seeking to repeal the law and delay its enactment until a vote was held in a referendum would be invalid as it would violate provisions of the Human Rights Act of 1977, which specifically disallow the public's voting against several protected classes—one being, sexual orientation. On June 30, 2009, a Superior Court judge ruled against a group opposed to the new law. The group had sought a referendum on the issue and had also asked the court to delay the law's enactment until it reached a final decision on the case. The group had filed with the court three weeks after the passage of the new law. Judge Judith E. Retchin ruled "there was no excuse" for them to file their lawsuit so late. She also agreed with the Board's decision that allowing a vote on the issue would violate the Human Rights Act.

=== Passage of legislation in 2009 ===
Councilman David Catania introduced the Religious Freedom And Civil Marriage Equality Amendment Act 2009 on October 6, 2009, to allow same-sex couples to marry in the District. On November 17, the Board of Elections rejected a proposed ballot measure to ban same-sex marriage, saying that the proposed ballot measure "authorizes discrimination prohibited under the Human Rights Act." On December 1, the same-sex marriage bill passed by a vote of 11–2 in its first reading. A final reading was held on December 15, where the measure was again passed by a vote of 11–2. The bill received Mayor Fenty's signature on December 18 and was subject to a 30-day congressional review period before becoming law. It was considered unlikely that the law would be overturned, and the District Government estimated that the law would take effect on March 3, 2010. Marriage licenses became available on March 3. Due to a three-day business waiting period between obtaining a marriage license and getting married, the first same-sex marriages in the District of Columbia were performed on March 9. Angelisa Young and Sinjoyla Townsend were the first couple to marry on Tuesday morning, March 9 at the headquarters of the Human Rights Campaign.

December 15, 2009 vote in the Council
Political affiliation	Voted for	Voted against	Absent (Did not vote)
Democratic Party	9: Muriel Bowser; Kwame R. Brown; Mary Cheh; Jack Evans; Jim Graham; Vincent C. Gray; Phil Mendelson; Harry Thomas Jr.; Tommy Wells	2: Yvette Alexander; Marion Barry	–
Independent	2: Michael A. Brown; David Catania	–	–
Total	11	2	0
Total	84.6%	15.4%	0.0%

The definition of marriage in the District of Columbia was amended to the following:

Marriage is the legally recognized union of 2 persons. Any person may enter into a marriage in the District of Columbia with another person, regardless of gender, unless the marriage is expressly prohibited by § 46-401.01 or § 46-403. [DC Code § 46-401]

On March 25, 2010, during debate on a health care bill, the U.S. Senate defeated an attempt by Senator Bob Bennett to "suspend the issuance of marriage licenses to any couple of the same sex until the people of the District of Columbia have the opportunity to hold a referendum or initiative on the question".

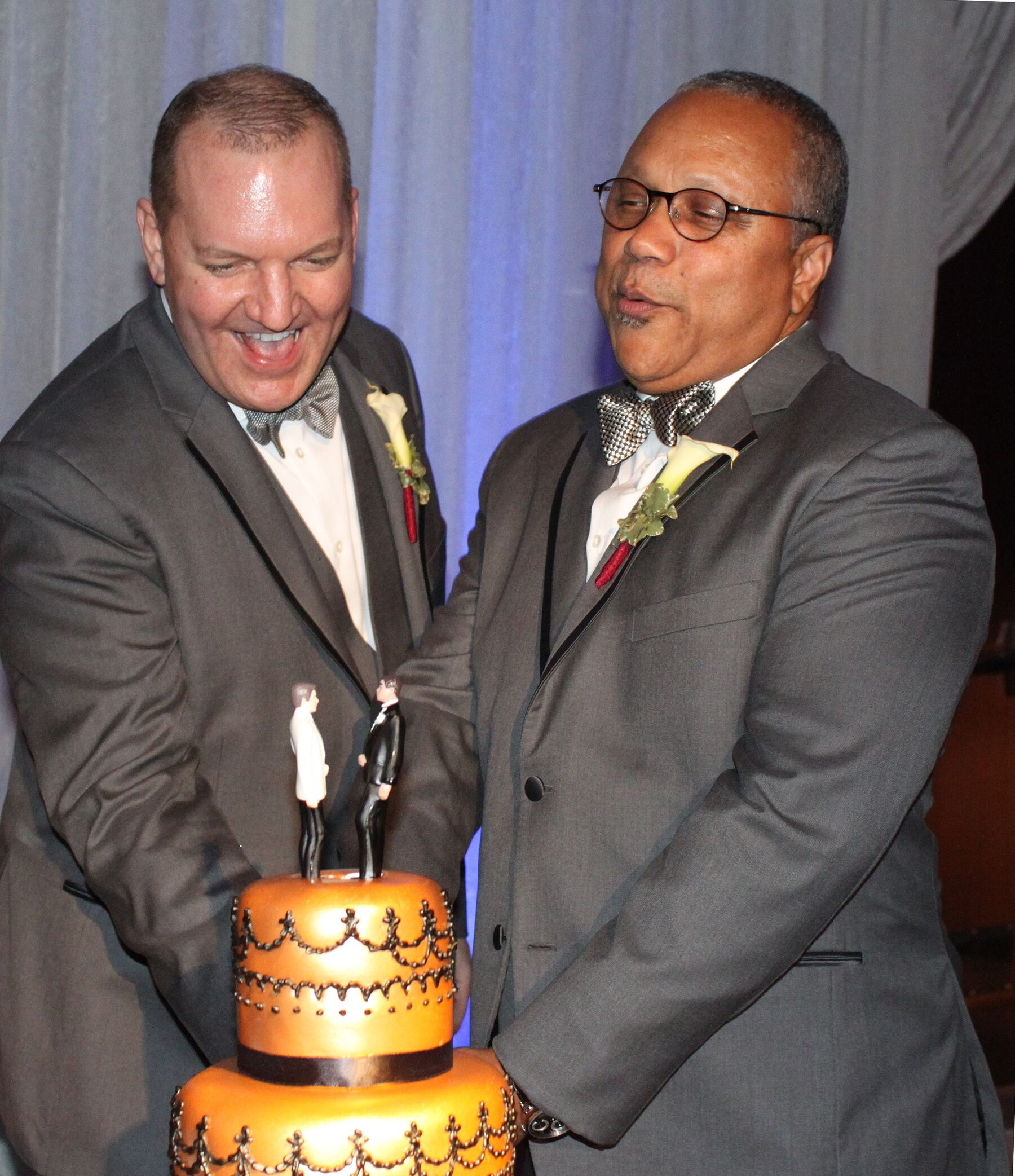
A newlywed same-sex couple in the District of Columbia cutting their wedding cake, 2016

Bishop Harry R. Jackson, Jr., pastor at the Hope Christian Church in Beltsville, Maryland, sued the Board of Elections for refusing to approve a ballot initiative on same-sex marriage. The Board stated that such an initiative would violate the District's human rights laws, a decision the Superior Court upheld in January 2010. The Court of Appeals heard an appeal of the Superior Court's decision in Jackson v. D.C. Board of Elections and Ethics on May 4. Attorneys argued that the Council acted within District laws in voting on and eventually passing the legislation. On July 15, the Court of Appeals upheld the Superior Court's decision in a 5–4 decision. The U.S. Supreme Court on January 18, 2011, rejected Jackson's appeal without comment.

=== Economic impact ===
A 2009 study from the University of California, Los Angeles concluded that extending marriage to same-sex couples would boost the District of Columbia's economy by over $52.2 million over three years, which would generate increases in local government tax and fee revenues by $5.4 million and create approximately 700 new jobs.

=== Demographics and marriage statistics ===
Data from the 2000 U.S. census showed that 3,678 same-sex couples were living in the District of Columbia. Same-sex couples lived in all wards of the District, and constituted 5.1% of coupled households and 1.5% of all households. Same-sex partners were on average younger than opposite-sex partners, more likely to be employed, and more likely to have a college degree. In addition, the average and median household incomes of same-sex couples were higher than different-sex couples, and 64% of same-sex couples owned their homes. 8% of same-sex couples were raising children under the age of 18, with an estimated 441 children living in households headed by same-sex couples in 2005.

The 2020 U.S. census showed that there were 4,420 married same-sex couple households (3,139 male couples and 1,281 female couples) and 3,632 unmarried same-sex couple households in the District of Columbia.

== Public opinion ==
Public opinion for same-sex marriage in the District of Columbia
Poll source	Dates administered	Sample size	Margin of error	Support	Opposition	Do not know / refused
Public Religion Research Institute	February 28 – December 8, 2025	160 adults	?	71%	28%	1%
Public Religion Research Institute	March 13 – December 2, 2024	165 adults	?	82%	18%	0%
Public Religion Research Institute	March 9 – December 7, 2023	156 adults	?	80%	20%	<0.5%
Public Religion Research Institute	March 11 – December 14, 2022	?	?	82%	17%	1%
Public Religion Research Institute	March 8 – November 9, 2021	?	?	86%	14%	<0.5%
Public Religion Research Institute	April 5 – December 23, 2017	?	?	78%	17%	5%
Public Religion Research Institute	May 18, 2016 – January 10, 2017	?	?	75%	20%	5%
Public Religion Research Institute	April 29, 2015 – January 7, 2016	?	?	60%	33%	7%
The Washington Post	January 24–28, 2010	1,135 adults	± 3.0%	56%	35%	9%

The 2017 Public Religion Research Institute (PRRI) poll found that 78% of District of Columbia residents supported same-sex marriage, while 17% were opposed and 5% were unsure. When consideration was given to the entire Washington metropolitan area (which contains parts of neighboring Virginia, Maryland and West Virginia), support was at 69% and opposition at 22%. The 2021 PRRI survey showed that 86% of respondents supported same-sex marriage, while 14% opposed. This level of support was the highest in the United States, followed by Massachusetts at 85% and Minnesota, Rhode Island and Washington at 82%.

== See also ==
- LGBT rights in the District of Columbia
- Same-sex marriage in the United States
