= List of LGBTQ rights organizations in the United States =

LGBTQ Advocate Groups across America

This is a list of LGBTQ rights organizations in the United States. It does not include LGBT organizations affiliated with political parties.

== National ==
Organization	Year founded	Focus	Status	Refs
Accord Alliance	2008	Healthcare	Active	
ACT UP	1987	HIV/AIDS	Active	
Advocates for Informed Choice	2006	Intersex	Renamed interACT	
Affirmation: LGBTQ Mormons, Families & Friends	1977	Mormons	Active	
Against Equality	2009	Anti-capitalist discourse		
American Foundation for Equal Rights	2009	Prop. 8 opposition	Active	
American Veterans for Equal Rights	1990	Veterans	Active	
American Military Partner Association	2009	LGBTQ military families and Veterans	Merged with OutServe-SLDN and renamed to Modern Military Association of America in 2019	
Aromantic-spectrum Union for Recognition, Education, and Advocacy	2019	Aromanticism	Active	
Asexual Visibility and Education Network	2001	Asexuality	Active	
Athlete Ally	2011	Sports	Active	
Atticus Circle	2004	Straight allies	Active	
Bash Back!	2007	Anarchist direct action	Dissolved	
Bialogue	2005	Bisexuality		
BiNet USA	1990	Bisexuality	Active	
Bisexual Resource Center	1985	Bisexuality	Active	
Campus Pride	2001	Students	Active	
Cheer, Dorothy, Cheer!	2002	Awareness		
COLAGE	1990	Children of LGBTQ parents	Active	
Daughters of Bilitis	1955	Lesbian	Dissolved	
El/La Para TransLatinas	2006	Latinas who are trans women	Active	
Empowering Spirits Foundation	2008	Community service	Dissolved	
Equality Across America	2009	National Equality March	Dissolved	
Equality Federation	1997		Active	
Family Equality Council	1979			
Fight OUT Loud	2007			
Fine By Me	2003		Merged into Atticus Circle	
Freedom to Marry	2003	Marriage equality	Dissolved	
Gay, Lesbian and Straight Education Network (GLSEN)	1990		Active	
Gay Liberation Front#United States (GLF)	1969		Dissolved	
Gay Liberation Network	1998	Direct action	Active	
Gay Rights National Lobby	1976		Merged into the HRC	
GenderPAC (GPAC)	1995		Dissolved	
GetEQUAL	2010		Active	
GLAAD	1985		Active	
GLBTQ Legal Advocates & Defenders (GLAD Law)	1978			
GLIFAA	1992		Active	
GLMA: Health Professionals Advancing LGBTQ Equality	1994 (1981)	Homophobia in medicine	Active	
Global Equality Fund	2011			
GSA Network	1998		Active	
Human Rights Campaign (HRC)	1980		Active	
Immigration Equality	1994		Active	
interACT	2006		Active	
Integrity USA	1974			
International Foundation for Gender Education (IFGE)	1987			
Intersex Campaign for Equality (IC4E) formerly OII-USA	2011			
Join the Impact	2008			
Keshet	2001		Active	
Lambda Legal	1971		Active	
Lavender Menace	1970			
Lesbian and Gay Band Association	1982			
Lesbian Avengers	1992			
LGBTQ Victory Fund	1991			
Love Makes a Family	1992		Dissolved	
LPAC	2012		Active	
Marriage Equality USA	1998		Dissolved	
Mattachine Society	1950			
Matthew Shepard Foundation	1998		Active	
Modern Military Association of America	2012	LGBTQ military, military families, and veterans	Active—Renamed from OutServe-SLDN with the merger of American Military Partner Association	
National Black Justice Collective (NBJC)	2003		Active	
National Center for Lesbian Rights (NCLR)	1977		Active	
National Center for Transgender Equality (NCTE)	2003		Active	
National Coalition of Black Lesbians and Gays	1978		Dissolved	
National Gay Pilots Association (NGPA)	1990		Active	
National LGBT Chamber of Commerce (NGLCC)	2002		Active	
National Lesbian and Gay Journalists Association (NLGJA)	1990		Active	
National LGBTQ Task Force (The Task Force)	1973		Active	
National Transgender Advocacy Coalition	1999			
NOH8 Campaign	2009	Prop. 8		
North American Conference of Homophile Organizations (NACHO)	1966		Dissolved in 1970	
ONE National Gay & Lesbian Archives	1952			
Out & Equal	1996		Active	
OutServe-SLDN	2012	LGBTQ military and Veterans	Merged with American Military Partner Association and renamed Modern Military Association of America in 2019	
PFLAG	1973		Active	
Pride at Work	1994		Active	
Queer Nation	1990			
RESYST	2000		Dissolved	
Rainbow Railroad USA	2015	Global LGBTQI+ refugee support and advocacy	Active	
Rainbow Sash	1998			
Services & Advocacy for GLBT Elders (SAGE)	1979		Active	
Servicemembers Legal Defense Network (SLDN)	1993		Merged into OutServe-SLDN	
Society for Human Rights	1924		Dissolved	
Soulforce	1998			
Sports Equality Foundation	2023	LGBTQ Representation in Sport & the LGBTQ Sports Hall of Fame	Active	
StartOut	2009		Active	
Sylvia Rivera Law Project	2002	Legal aid	Active	
The Ace and Aro Advocacy Project (TAAAP)	2018	Aromanticism; Asexuality	Active	
Think Again	1997		Dissolved	
Trans Student Educational Resources	2011		Active	
Transgender Law Center	2002		Active	
Truth Wins Out	2006		Active	

== Alabama ==
- Equality Alabama

== Arkansas ==
- Center for Artistic Revolution

== Arizona ==
- Equality Arizona

== California ==
- Californians Against Hate
- Courage Campaign
- Equality Armenia
- EQCA (Equality California)
- GALAS LGBTQ+ Armenian Society
- Lavender Panthers (defunct)
- Los Angeles LGBT Center
- Love Honor Cherish
- Marriage Equality California (defunct)
- Society for Individual Rights (probably defunct)
- Trans-e-motion
- Trikone

== Colorado ==
- Gay Coalition of Denver
- Pink Panthers

== Connecticut ==
- Equality Connecticut
- Love Makes a Family (Connecticut) (defunct)

== Florida ==
- Equality Florida
- The Pride Center at Equality Park
- SAVE Dade

== Georgia ==
- Georgia Equality

== Hawaii ==
- Equality Hawaii

== Illinois ==
- The Civil Rights Agenda
- Equality Illinois
- Society for Human Rights (defunct)

== Iowa ==
- One Iowa

== Kansas ==
- Kansas Equality Coalition
- Simply Equal

== Kentucky ==
- Fairness Campaign
- Kentucky Equality Federation
- Kentucky Fairness Alliance (defunct)

== Louisiana ==
- Forum for Equality
- Louisiana Electorate of Gays And Lesbians (defunct)

== Maine ==
- EqualityMaine

== Maryland ==
- Equality Maryland
- Gender Rights Maryland
- Maryland Coalition for Trans Equality

== Massachusetts ==
- Harvard Gay & Lesbian Caucus
- Knowthyneighbor.org
- Massachusetts Transgender Political Coalition
- MassEquality

== Michigan ==
- Equality Michigan
- Michigan Equality (defunct)
- Michigan Organization for Human Rights (defunct)
- Triangle Foundation (defunct)

== Minnesota ==
- OutFront Minnesota

== Mississippi ==
- Equality Mississippi
- Mississippi Safe Schools Coalition

== Missouri ==
- Missourians for Equality
- PROMO

== Nebraska ==
- OutNebraska
- Nebraska Coalition for Gay and Lesbian Civil Rights

== New Jersey ==
- Garden State Equality

== New York ==
- African Ancestral Lesbians United for Societal Change
- Audre Lorde Project
- Empire State Pride Agenda (defunct)
- Fed Up Queers (defunct)
- Gay Activists Alliance (defunct)
- Marriage Equality New York (defunct)
- New York Area Bisexual Network
- New Yorkers United for Marriage
- Sex Panic!
- Street Transvestite Action Revolutionaries (defunct)
- Sylvia Rivera Law Project

== North Carolina ==
- Equality North Carolina
- North Carolina Religious Coalition for Marriage Equality (defunct)

== North Dakota ==
- Ten Percent Society

== Ohio ==
- Equality Ohio

== Oklahoma ==
- Cimarron Alliance Foundation

== Oregon ==
- Basic Rights Oregon

== Pennsylvania ==
- Pennsylvania Equality Project

== Tennessee ==
- Tennessee Equality Project
- Tennessee Transgender Political Coalition

== Texas ==
- Equality Texas
- Transgender Education Network of Texas
- Houston GLBT Political Caucus (HGLBTPC)
- QWELL Community Foundation, Austin
- Queer Liberaction
- Austin Black Pride (defunct)

== Utah ==
- Equality Utah
- Stonewall Shooting Sports of Utah
- Transgender Education Advocates of Utah

== Washington (state) ==
- Citizens for Fairness Hands Off Washington (defunct)
- Equal Rights Washington
- Washington Families Standing Together (defunct)
- Washington United for Marriage (defunct)
- Gender Justice League

== Washington, D.C. ==
- Gay and Lesbian Activists Alliance (GLAA)

== Wisconsin ==
- Equality Wisconsin

== See also ==
- Latina lesbian organizations in the United States - List of organizations that were formed out of the intersectionality of lesbian identifying Latina's in the United States
- List of LGBT rights organizations
- List of LGBT-related organizations and conferences
- List of intersex organizations
- List of transgender-rights organizations
- List of LGBT community centers in the United States
- LGBT rights by country or territory
- LGBT community
