= List of transgender-rights organizations =

Transgender organizations seek to promote understanding and acceptance, both legally and socially, of transgender people.

== International ==
- International Foundation for Gender Education (IFGE)
- GATE
- World Professional Association for Transgender Health (WPATH)

== Europe ==
- Transgender Europe (TGEU)

=== Germany ===
- Deutsche Gesellschaft für Trans*- und Inter*geschlechtlichkeit e.V. (dgti)
- Bundesverband Trans* e.V. (BVT*)

=== Armenia ===
- Right Side NGO

=== Belgium ===
- Genres Pluriels

=== United Kingdom ===
- All About Trans
- The Gender Trust
- Mermaids
- Press for Change
- Sparkle (charity)
- Trans Kids Deserve Better
- Trans Media Watch
- Trans Aid Cymru
- Not a Phase
- BASH BACK

== Asia ==
=== India ===
- Sahodari Foundation
- Humsafar Trust
- Sangama
- Sappho for Equality

=== Iraq ===
- Rasan

=== Taiwan ===
- Taiwan TG Butterfly Garden

== Australia ==
- Transgender Victoria
- Zoe Belle Gender Collective
- InterAction for Health and Human Rights

== North America ==
=== United States ===
- Audre Lorde Project
- El/La Para TransLatinas
- GenderPAC
- Gender Justice League
- Gender Rights Maryland
- Ingersoll Gender Center
- International Foundation for Gender Education
- Maryland Coalition for Trans Equality
- Massachusetts Transgender Political Coalition
- National Center for Transgender Equality
- National Transgender Advocacy Coalition
- Street Transvestite Action Revolutionaries
- Sylvia Rivera Law Project
- Tennessee Transgender Political Coalition
- TGI Justice Project
- Trans-e-motion
- Transcending Boundaries Conference
- Transgender Archive
- Transgender Education Advocates of Utah
- Transgender Foundation of America
- Transgender Law Center
- Transgender Oral History Project
- Trans Student Educational Resources

=== Canada ===
- Egale Canada
- Trans Lifeline

== South America ==
=== Brazil ===
- Associação Nacional de Travestis e Transexuais
- Minha Criança Trans

=== Ecuador ===
- Coccinelle Association

== Africa ==
=== Kenya ===
- Gay and Lesbian Coalition of Kenya

=== Morocco ===
- Kif-Kif

=== Tunisia ===
- Shams

=== Uganda ===
- Sexual Minorities Uganda (SMUG)

== See also ==
- Transgender rights
- LGBT rights by country or territory
- List of transgender-related topics
- List of transgender publications
