= Citizens for Fairness Hands Off Washington =

LGBTQ organization to oppose two Washington ballot initiatives

Hands Off Washington
- Hands Off Washington logo featured on signs, stickers and posters

- U.S. State of Washington
- Formation: 1993
- Dissolved: 1997

Washington Citizens for Fairness | Hands off Washington (H.O.W.) was created in 1993 to defeat Washington state ballot initiatives 608 and 610, which threatened the civil rights of state and local public employees based on their actual or perceived sexual orientation.

== History ==
In 1993, The Oregon Citizens Alliance attempted to influence Washington politics by gathering signatures for a ballot initiative that would have restricted the civil rights of LGBTQ citizens in the state. The Citizens for Fairness/Hands Off Washington campaign was a grassroots gay rights effort that repelled this attempt, casting the OCA as an Oregonian organization trying to manipulate Washington state politics. During its brief history, the HOW campaign repelled multiple OCA attempts. In 1997, Washington's existing discrimination laws protected against many different classes, but not sexual orientation, perceived or actual; the HOW campaign attempted to add both categories to the existing anti-discrimination laws through a ballot measure, Initiative 677, which failed to pass despite high-profile support from Governor Gary Locke.

However, Initiative 677 was the first-ever attempt to win statewide legal rights at the ballot box, a controversial strategy never before attempted. Until this ballot measure, conventional LGBTQ rights strategies focused on court precedents and legislative sponsored bills. In spite of this loss, HOW was significant in its track record of defeating every anti-LGBTQ measure brought forward and expanding strategies for LGBTQ rights.

Hands Off Washington lost momentum after this setback, and faded gradually over the following years.

== Legacy ==
Hands Off Washington was founded as the first-ever statewide LGBTQ rights organization, with active chapters in 22 counties, including many in conservative Eastern Washington. This unprecedented strategy allowed HOW to tap local community activists in every corner of the State, in rural and suburban areas as well as urban ones. Until HOW, LGBTQ rights were headquartered and active only in large liberal cities, often overlooking small towns and rural LGBTQ people.

HOW was the forerunner of many Washingtonian LGBTQ civil rights organizations, including Equal Rights Washington and Washington Families Standing Together. It was formed as an ad hoc grassroots effort consisting almost entirely of volunteers operating on a minimal budget, and achieved remarkable success given its lack of formal structure or funds. While other LGBTQ service groups predate the Washington Citizens for Fairness/Hands Off Washington campaign, they were mostly non-political in nature, and therefore the HOW can be seen as one of the first significant, statewide efforts at political involvement by LGBTQ people in Washington state. A documentary, We're Here to Stay: a Documentary About Hands Off Washington and the Politics of Washington State, was released in 1998 to chronicle the organization's rapid rise and equally rapid decline.

While the group has largely been forgotten, it appears quite frequently in news articles published during the period in which it was active, from about 1993 to the end of 1997.

HOW established the potential for LGBTQ political organizations to garner support far from the heavily urbanized parts of Western Washington, where prior misconceptions alleged the only real support base could exist. This laid the groundwork for the organizations that followed it, and many of the leaders of those organizations got their start in the HOW campaign.

== See also ==
- Basic Rights Oregon
- History of Washington (state)
- LGBTQ rights in Washington (state)
- List of LGBTQ rights organizations in the United States
