= LGBTQ Aggies =

Student group at Texas A&M University

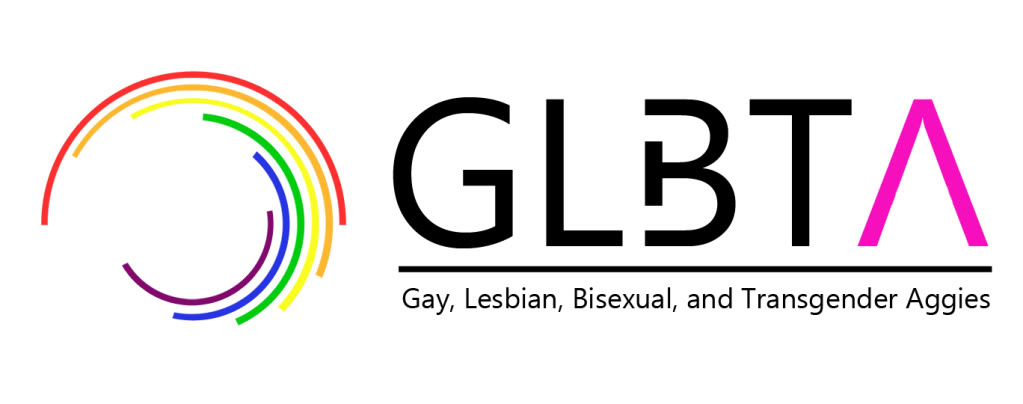
Logo of LGBTQA while using their prior name

Lesbian, Gay, Bisexual, Transgender, and Queer Aggies (LGBTQ Aggies, LGTBQA, or QA) is an officially recognized student group at Texas A&M University. Originally known as Gay Student Services (GSS) and later as Gay, Lesbian, Bisexual, and Transgender Aggies (GLBT Aggies), the organization was officially recognized by Texas A&M University in 1985 after a lengthy court battle.

== History ==
In the spring semester of 1976, a group of Texas A&M students organized a gay support group. In April of that year Michael Minton, Michael Garrett, and Sherri Skinner approached John Koldus, the Texas A&M Vice President for Student Affairs, and requested limited recognition for an organization to support gay issues. The students did not want full university recognition, which included partial funding from student fees as well as official office space in the Student Programs Office, because several of their members wished to be discreet about their sexual orientation. Instead, the group requested only meeting space on campus and the right to post notices on school bulletin boards and in the student newspaper. Koldus informed the students that the university did not offer limited recognition, and that to gain the access they had asked for the students must apply for full official status. What followed was the lengthy court battle Gay Student Services v. Texas A&M University. At the conclusion of the litigation, GSS was recognized as an official student organization by legal decision in April 1985. Over the years, the name of the organization has evolved to be more inclusive. Today GLBT Aggies is an organization for queer people and straight allies alike, where anyone is welcome to join regardless of how they identify.

== Organization ==
LGBTQA is led by an executive council of democratically elected members. Elections are held at the end of the academic year, with special elections held for vacant seats during the academic year as needed. Elected positions include: President, Vice-President, Secretary, Treasurer, Historian, and Social Chair. LGBTQA also has a seat on the Graduate Student Council. This position is appointed by the elected officers of the LGBTQA. These leaders make up the voting members of the Executive Council, and it is their responsibility to establish programming, set policy, and guide the organization to better serve its members. The organization also has up to two advisors who hold non-voting seats on the executive committee. The Advisors are selected by the elected leaders of LGBTQA each year.

== Campus activities ==
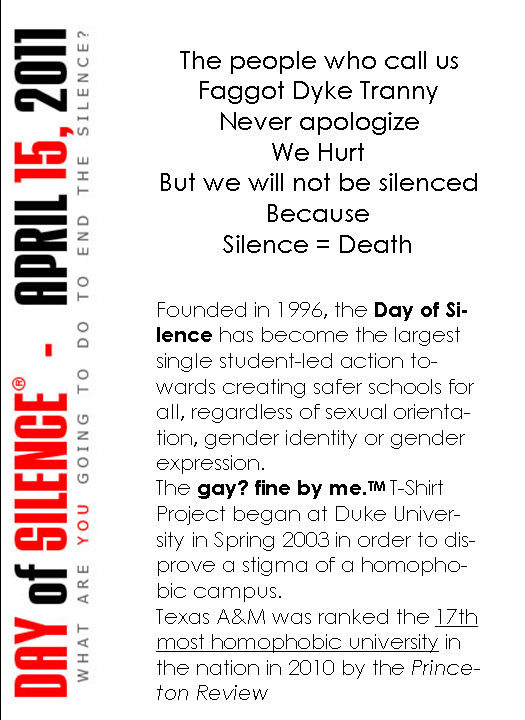
Flyer attached to the "gay? fine by me" T-shirt giveaway in April 2011

=== General meetings ===
LGBTQA hosts weekly meetings that provide an opportunity for members to socialize, learn about the history and current issues affecting members of the LGBTQ community, and organize outreach efforts within the Bryan–College Station area.

=== "gay? fine by me." ===
In April 2010, 2011, and 2012 on the National Day of Silence LGBTQA partnered with Atticus Circle to bring the Fine By Me T-shirt project to the Texas A&M campus. Each year, LGBTQA was able to fundraise enough money to give away 1,000 T-shirts bearing the phrase "gay? fine by me." In 2012 LGBTQA were the first group to expand the Fine By Me project to include T-shirts bearing the phrases: "lesbian? fine by me." "bisexual? fine by me." and "transgender? fine by me."

=== Community outreach ===
LGBTQA has participated in many activities designed to engage and educate citizens of the broader Bryan-College Station area about the LGBTQ community. The organization has officially participated in MSC Open House, The Big Event, and the Day of Silence. The organization has also occasionally set up a table in Academic Plaza, where they distribute information on upcoming activities.

== Campus environment ==
Texas A&M is often perceived as an unwelcoming university to LGBTQ students, a challenge LGBTQA has faced since the initial struggle for LGBTQ recognition. In 2011 and 2012 it was ranked as the least-LGBTQ friendly public university in the United States by the Princeton Review.

During the 2011 Texas legislative session, the Texas A&M Student Senate and state representative Wayne Christian filed concurrent bills that would require public universities in Texas to spend equal state dollars on a center promoting "traditional and family values" as campus LGBTQ resource centers. The measure eventually failed in the Texas A&M Student Senate after the student body president vetoed the bill. The bill in the Texas legislature was ultimately withdrawn by the author after a point of order was raised that would have derailed the entire budget bill it was attached to.

A similar measure was introduced in the Texas A&M Student Senate in March 2013. The proposed bill would allow students with religious objections to "opt-out" of paying a portion of their student fees to the Texas A&M GLBT Resource Center. In a statement, the organization called the bill "a direct and blatant attack against the LGBTQ Aggie community." They continued:

We stand for commitment to each other as fellow students of Texas A&M University. Our LGBT members are not separate from the community as a whole; they are an integral part of the backbone of the student body and of campus life. Depriving them of the resources that meet their unique needs and that help them succeed affects the entire community. The Texas A&M family includes students with diverse backgrounds, beliefs, and needs, bound together by our commitment to our university and to each other. An attack on our LGBT students is an attack on the Aggie spirit we all share.

On April 4, 2013, the Texas A&M Student Senate passed the bill by a vote of 35 in favor and 28 against. On April 5, 2013, the Student Body President at Texas A&M University, John Claybrook, vetoed the bill.

In the fall of 2013, GLBT Aggies officially changed its name to LGBTQ Aggies. This change shows homage to the modern gay rights movement, in which feminists exerted their rights to be known. Lesbian, Gay, Bisexual, Transgender, and Queer Aggies strive to be inclusive of all identities, and this positive change allows for open dialogue to occur in an ill informed society.

On November 14, 2018, the Texas A&M Student Senate passed a resolution that expressed support for the LGBT community at Texas A&M and GLBT Resource Center. Paired with a resolution in support of constructing more gender-inclusive restrooms on campus, this legislation was the first positive legislation regarding LGBTQ students to pass through the Student Senate.
