= Fine by Me =

Fine by Me may refer to:

- Fine by Me (organization), LGBT group
- "Fine by Me" (Andy Grammer song), 2011
- "Fine by Me" (Chris Brown song), 2015
