= Michael Cargill =

American radio announcer and gun activist

- Born: Fort Lauderdale, Florida
- Occupations: Gun rights activist Radio host
- Employer: Central Texas Gun Works
- Organization: Log Cabin Republicans (Austin chapter)
- Known for: Hosting the radio show Come And Talk It, challenging a federal bump stock ban, and his overall gun rights activism
- Political party: Republican
- Movement: Gun rights movement
- Website: michaelcargill.com

Michael D. Cargill is an American gun rights activist. He is the host of the gun rights radio show, Come And Talk It. He is also the owner of Central Texas Gun Works.

== Biography ==
Cargill was born in Fort Lauderdale, Florida. He spent his early life in Florida. Later, he joined the U.S. Army and served for twelve years, earning Army Achievement Medals, Commendation Medals, and Good Conduct Medals. He also qualified as a marksman and as a parachutist. After an honorable discharge as Sergeant, he moved to Texas, where he initially worked in telecommunications and later started a freight company.

Cargill became interested in firearms education following an assault on his grandmother, which led him to focus on teaching self-defense. In 2011, he founded Central Texas Gun Works in Austin.

In 2014, Cargill ran for the Texas House of Representatives to represent the 50th district in a special election held in January, but he was unsuccessful. In the same year, his store was named America's first Bitcoin gun store.

In 2015, Cargill initiated a lawsuit against the City of Austin for its decision to declare City Hall a gun-free zone following the statewide legalization of open carry in most public places. The legal dispute concluded in 2019, with Judge Lora Livingston of the 261st Civil District Court ruling in Cargill's favor and fining the city $9,000 for denying entry to licensed gun holders on multiple occasions.

In 2017, a member of the Austin City Council nominated Cargill to a board addressing traffic issues in Austin, but he was rejected by other council members due to his views on the Second Amendment.

In June 2022, Cargill served as the acting chairman of the Log Cabin Republicans (LCR) of Texas, a group of gay Texas GOP members, following the abrupt resignation of Marco Roberts as chairman. Cargill resigned from the position five weeks later, along with other members of the LCR Texas state board. He continues to serve as the president of LCR's Austin chapter.

In June 2024, Cargill successfully challenged a federal ban on bump stocks, culminating in a 6-3 U.S. Supreme Court decision. The court determined that the Bureau of Alcohol, Tobacco, Firearms and Explosives (ATF) could not classify bump stocks as machine guns under existing legislation. This ruling came after Cargill, who had surrendered two bump stocks to the ATF, filed a lawsuit arguing that the agency had exceeded its authority. The challenge was supported by the New Civil Liberties Alliance. The ATF's inclusion of bump stocks under the "machinegun" category followed the 2017 Las Vegas shooting.

Cargill also provides firearm training for disabled individuals across Texas.
