= ERW =

ERW may refer to:

- Electric resistance welding
- Energy return wheel, an airless tire
- Enhanced radiation weapon
- Explosive remnants of war, a term for unexploded ordnance
- Enhanced rock weathering
- Equal Rights Washington, an LGBT advocacy and community outreach organization in Washington state, U.S.
- Erw, the unit for the Welsh acre
