= Bradley Angle =

Nonprofit organization in Oregon, United States

- Formation: 1975
- Location: Portland, Oregon, United States

Bradley Angle is a nonprofit organization based in Portland, Oregon, United States. It was founded in 1975 as the first domestic violence shelter on the West Coast under the name Bradley Angle House. Bonnie Tinker was its cofounder and first director. The name honors Sharon Bradley and Pam Angle who died from the violence of the street life.

The City of Portland presented the organization with a Spirit of Portland award in 2012.
