= Bonnie Tinker =

American activist (1948–2009)

- Bonnie Tinker, from a 1963 newspaper
- Born: May 26, 1948; Boone, Iowa, U.S.
- Died: July 2, 2009 (aged 61); Blacksburg, Virginia, U.S.
- Occupations: Activist, photographer, radio host, community leader

Bonnie Jeanne Tinker (May 26, 1948 – July 2, 2009) was an American activist, photographer, radio host, and founder of Love Makes a Family, which advocated for LGBTQ families. She was also chair of the National Coalition Against Domestic Violence, and founding director of Bradley Angle, an emergency shelter program in Portland, Oregon.

== Early life and education ==
Tinker was born in Boone, Iowa, one of the seven children of Leonard Edward Tinker and Lorena Jeanne McGregor Tinker. She grew up in Des Moines, Iowa. Her parents were active in the civil rights and peace movements. The Tinker family were the plaintiffs in Tinker v. Des Moines Independent Community School District, a United States Supreme Court case about high school students' right to protest. In 1963, she won an essay contest sponsored by the NAACP. She attended Grinnell College as a theatre major in the class of 1969, but refused to take the examinations required to graduate. She also studied in Mexico. She later studied photography and journalism at Portland Community College.

== Career and activism ==
During college, Tinker worked for Michigan Migrant Opportunity, a federal anti-poverty program. After college, she was a member of the Red Emma Collective in Portland, Oregon, and helped establish a women's clinic and a Quaker women's shelter. From 1975 to 1979, she served as founding director of Bradley-Angle House, another women's shelter. She was an early leader of the National Coalition Against Domestic Violence. She lived at WHO Farm in Estacada, a women's land project. She was the Portland contact for the McKenzie River Gathering, and worked for Volunteers of America in the mid-1980s. From 1987 to 1992, she was a freelance photographer. In 1998 she joined her mother in El Salvador and Nicaragua, to do relief work for people impacted by Hurricane Mitch.

In 1992, Tinker made Love Makes a Family, a documentary about LGBTQ families. She hosted the "Love Makes a Family" radio show, and was founder and director of Love Makes a Family organization. Tinker was a founding member of the Gay and Lesbian Archives of the Pacific Northwest (now Oregon Queer History Collective), which was established in Portland, Oregon in 1994. In 1995 she attended the World Conference on Women in Beijing. She taught Quaker workshops on nonviolent change, under the title "Opening Hearts and Minds". "If you don't want to be attacking and defending all the time," she explained in a 1995 interview, "you have to start by not attacking." In 1996, she and Pamela Pegg made an exhibit for the Oregon State Fair from their collection of pins, clippings, photographs, and posters from LGBTQ activism; the exhibit was moved after its content raised concerns. She protested the Iraq War with Seriously Pissed-Off Grannies, and was arrested several times over the years for her non-violent political activities. A fellow activist once recalled, "If there was a demonstration and something she could get arrested about, she was there. Bonnie never knew a sideline to sit on."

== Personal life and legacy ==
Bonnie Tinker came out as a lesbian in the 1970s. Tinker and her partner Sharon Keeler adopted a daughter, Connie. Tinker married her longtime partner Sara Graham in 2004, during a brief window of legalized same-sex marriage that year in Oregon. Tinker and Graham raised their sons Josh and Alex together. Their family was featured on a 2001 segment of ABC's 20/20 about gay and lesbian parents. Tinker died in a traffic accident in 2009, at the age of 61, while riding her bicycle on the Virginia Tech campus in Blacksburg, Virginia. The Love Makes a Family organization also ended in 2009. There is a large collection of her papers, recordings, and photographs in the Oregon Historical Society Research Library. The Bonnie Tinker Emergency Shelter in Portland is named in her memory. In 2013, she was posthumously awarded a Doctor of Laws degree by Grinnell College.

== See also ==
- LGBTQ rights in Oregon
- List of LGBTQ people from Portland, Oregon
