= PROMO =

Nonprofit organization in Missouri

- U.S. State of Missouri
- Predecessor: People Aligned for Change and Equality (PACE); Privacy Rights Education Project (PREP)
- Formation: 1986
- Type: 501(c)(4)
- Tax ID no.: 45-1555164
- Legal status: Active nonprofit corporation
- Purpose: Promoting LGBTQ rights
- Headquarters: St. Louis
- Region served: Missouri
- Methods: Lobbying, community organizing, education, health and wellness services
- Executive Director: Steph Perkins
- Subsidiaries: PROMO PAC
- Affiliations: Equality Federation
- Revenue: 95,399 (2016)
- Expenses: 150,545 (2016)
- Staff: 8 (2016)
- Volunteers: 125 (2016)
- Website: promoonline.org

PROMO (Promoting Missouri) is a Missouri statewide LGBTQ advocacy and lobbying nonprofit organization. A member of the Equality Federation, it is the largest LGBTQ organization in the state.

So called conversion therapy is as of July 2018 still legal in Missouri (with the exception of a few jurisdictions) and PROMO is campaigning to ban the practice when it is forced on minors. PROMO, and partners such as the ACLU of Missouri and the Human Rights Campaign, work to pass a non-discrimination act in Missouri. A current project PROMO supports, with MTUG, is the Transgender Memorial Garden in St. Louis. PROMO is a major supporter of St. Louis PrideFest.

What became PROMO formed in 1986 as People Aligned for Change and Equality (PACE), in response to Bowers v. Hardwick. In 1990 it was formally registered as Privacy Rights Education Project (PREP). SAGE Metro St. Louis merged into PROMO in 2015.

== Alumni ==
- Elizabeth Fuchs, state legislator

== See also ==
- LGBT rights in Missouri
- Fairness Campaign (Kentucky)
- One Iowa
- OutNebraska
