= Gay Student Services v. Texas A&M University =

1984 U.S. court case

- Court: United States Court of Appeals for the Fifth Circuit
- Full case name: Gay Student Services, J.M. Minton, Keith Stewart and Patricia Wooldridge, Plaintiffs-Appellants v. Texas A&M University, et al., Defendants-Appellees
- Decided: August 3, 1984
- Docket nos.: 82-2366
- Citation: 737 F.2d 1317

Case history
- Prior history: 612 F.2d 160 (5th. Cir. Feb. 20, 1980)
- Subsequent history: Petition for certiorari denied, 471 U.S. 1001 (1985); 635 F. Supp. 776 (N.D. Tex. 1986)

Court membership
- Judges sitting: John Robert Brown, Thomas Morrow Reavley, Jerre Stockton Williams

Case opinions
- Majority: Brown, joined by Reavley, Williams

Laws applied
- First Amendment

Gay Student Services v. Texas A&M University, 737 F.2d 1317 (5th Cir. 1984) is a court case in which the Fifth U.S. Circuit Court of Appeals held that the First Amendment required public universities to recognize student organizations aimed at gay students. In 1976, Texas A&M University denied official recognition to the Gay Student Services Organization on the grounds that homosexuality was illegal in Texas, and the group's stated goals—offering referral services and providing educational information to students—were actually the responsibility of university staff. The students sued the university for violation of their First Amendment right to freedom of speech in February 1977. For six years, the case wound its way through the courts; although the trial court ruled in favor of Texas A&M several times, the Fifth U.S. Circuit Court of Appeals repeatedly overturned the verdict. The U.S. Supreme Court declined to take the case, letting stand the circuit court ruling that the students' free speech rights had been compromised.

== Background ==
When Texas A&M University opened in 1876, only male students were admitted. All students were required to join the Corps of Cadets and receive military training. Although the school was located in a sparsely populated area, student social clubs and fraternities were discouraged. After World War II ended, enrollment at A&M skyrocketed as many former soldiers used the G.I. Bill to further their education.

When in the 1950s editorials in the school newspaper, The Battalion, encouraged coeducation, the Student Senate demanded that the editor of the paper resign. Later in the year students defeated 2–1 a campus resolution on coeducation. Texas A&M finally became coeducational in 1963; female students were forbidden from joining the Corps of Cadets. The following year, the college was officially integrated, and in 1965 membership in the Corps of Cadets became voluntary. By 1970, enrollment had grown to more than 14,000 students from all 50 states and 75 nations.

== Precursor ==
In the spring semester of 1976, a group of Texas A&M students organized a gay support group. In an effort to advertise their new organization, they began posting flyers around the Texas A&M campus during the evenings. During one of these evenings, two of them were confronted at knifepoint by two other students, and forced to take all their flyers down. After that incident, they decided to get formal permission to post flyers.

In April of that year, three students identified in the court papers as M. Minton, M. Garrett, and S. Skinner (later determined to be Michael Minton, Michael Garrett, and Sherri Skinner) approached John Koldus, the Texas A&M Vice President for Student Affairs, and requested limited recognition for an organization to support gay issues. The students did not want full university recognition, which included partial funding from student fees as well as official office space in the Student Programs Office, because several of their members wished to be discreet about their sexual orientation. Instead, the group requested only meeting space on campus and the right to post notices on school bulletin boards and in the student newspaper. Koldus informed the students that the university did not offer limited recognition, and that to gain the access they had asked for the students must apply for fully official status.

The Director of Student Affairs, Carolyn Adair, advised the students to describe themselves as a service group rather than a political or social organization. Therefore, their application listed the group's goals as: creating a referral service for students advising professional counseling in several fields, providing information and education on life as a homosexual student, and sponsoring external speakers to discuss gay issues.

For the next six months, the application lingered unresolved, although as early as May a university memo – unseen by the students – emphatically stated that the university would not recognize the organization unless ordered to do so. On November 29, the application was officially denied on two grounds. The initial reason was that homosexual conduct was illegal in Texas. Furthermore, the university maintained that university staff held sole responsibility for offering referral services, educational information, and speakers. As a result, the university ruled that the student organization's mission was not "consistent with the philosophy and goals" of the university.

== Court proceedings ==
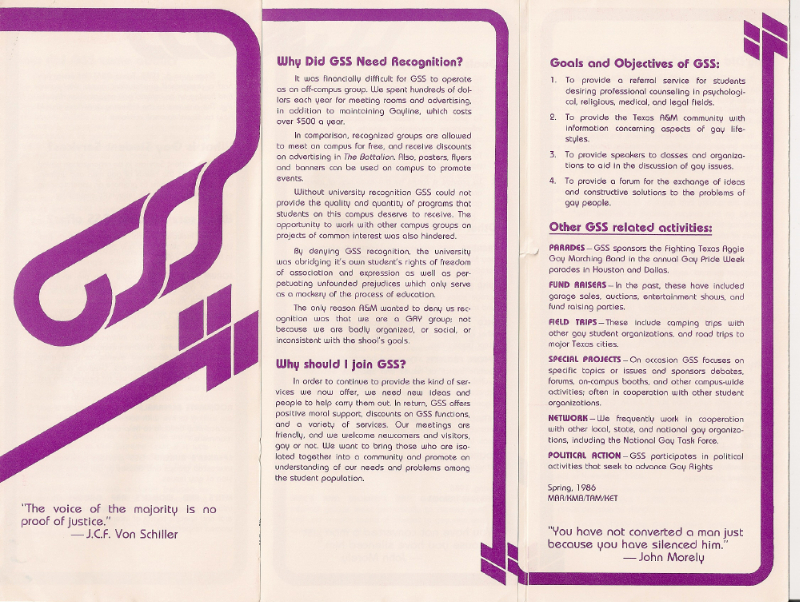
Partial view of GSS flyer detailing case and explaining purpose

=== District Court ===
The students sued the university in February 1977 for infringing their First Amendment right to freedom of speech. The case was initially dismissed by a trial court with no comment. The Fifth Circuit Court of Appeals remanded the case for trial. A bench trial, held in November 1981, was decided in favor of Texas A&M.

=== Court of Appeals ===
On August 3, 1984, the district decision was overturned by the appellate court. The appellate court ruled that, despite the mission listed in their application, the Gay Student Services group was primarily a social organization. The appellate court found that Texas A&M "did not and has not to the time of trial in this case, recognized fraternal organizations, i.e. student groups whose principal if not sole purpose is to hold social gatherings to encourage friendships and personal affinity", and that this was the primary reason for the refusal to grant official status. Although trial testimony had centered on other issues, the appellate court ruling hinted that the outcome might have been different if Texas A&M had argued that the denial was a result of public health concerns. This decision was rendered before there was much public awareness of AIDS.

== Subsequent Actions ==
Following this ruling, the state of Texas refused to further represent the university. Texas A&M officials instead hired a private lawyer, and appealed the case to the United States Supreme Court. In their brief, Texas A&M officials changed tactics. They now argued that recognizing the Gay Student Services organization would encourage more homosexual conduct, thus leading to increased psychological and physical problems. The brief further alleged that the appellate court ruling had "created for homosexuals a right not specifically enumerated in the Constitution." In response, the students argued that the university's appeal was "predicated largely on the mistaken belief that mere official recognition of a student service organization that has been meeting unofficially since 1976 will cause a significant increase in homosexual activity. This belief is completely unfounded."

=== Appeal to the Supreme Court ===
By this time, several other federal courts had also ruled that LGBT student organizations had a right to form under the First Amendment. The Supreme Court denied certiorari, letting stand the Fifth U.S. Circuit Court of Appeals ruling that ordered the school to recognize the student organization.

== Campus activism ==
GSS president Marco Roberts and David Kerr at the MDA Kissathon staged in Kyle Field in 1985. Converse photo in Aggie 1985 Yearbook.

During the period that began with the Fifth Circuit Court decision of August 3, 1984, ruling that Texas A&M acted improperly when it refused to recognize Gay Student Services, and then ended with the Supreme Court decision on April 1, 1985, not to hear Texas A&M's appeal, campus daily life and political activism was highly and tensely focused on the question of whether GSS (often mistakenly referred to as GSSO) should be allowed on campus. During those eight months, the university's student council voted on a resolution in favor of GSS recognition, after an address to the council by the GSS President Marco Roberts, creating a furor among the student population; hundreds of articles, columns, and letters to the editor appeared in the school's paper and the city newspaper regarding the controversial issue; dozens of news reports appeared on local and national news programs.; multiple formal debate forums on the issue were held on campus, with GSS leaders invited to participate; two major on-campus protest rallies were led by the leaders of GSS (at the invitation of a recognized student group called Students Working Against Many Problems, or SWAMP) which were attended and counter-protested by hundreds of students; and lastly, Marco Roberts and David Kerr (president of the gay student group at Trinity University) joined 1,400 couples at the MDA Kissathon held at Kyle field during the spring semester of 1985, surrounded by a curtain of SWAMP couples.

In a matter of coincidence, the last on-campus rally hosted by SWAMP to provide GSS leaders the opportunity to speak and distribute literature occurred on April 1, 1985, the same day the Supreme Court rendered its decision that let the Fifth Circuit Court ruling stand, effectively ending the legal battle in GSS's favor.

== Legacy ==
The case set a national precedent by removing all legal restrictions against gay rights groups on campuses. The subsequent recognition of the group provided a university precedent for allowing social organizations. In 1977, the university had also denied recognition to Sigma Phi Epsilon, a national social fraternity, because its presence on campus might result in "a social caste system". On March 31 and April 1, 2010, through the efforts of the GLBT Resource Center, the GLBT Professional Network and the Queer Studies Working Group at Texas A&M, and with funding from many campus bodies including the President's Office, the university celebrated the 25th anniversary of the Supreme Court's inaction with a well-attended two-day symposium, "25 Years After," that featured an exploration of "Queer of Color" the first day and "GLBT in Higher Education" on the second, featuring a keynote speech by the openly gay president of Roosevelt University, Charles R. Middleton.

== See also ==
- LGBT rights in Texas
- LGBTQ Aggies

== Sources ==
- O'Neil, Robert M. (1997), Free Speech in the College Community, Indiana University Press, ISBN 978-0-253-33267-7
- Pinello, Daniel R. (2003), Gay rights and American law, University of Cambridge, ISBN 0521012147
