= 1998 in LGBTQ rights =

This is a list of notable events in the history of LGBT rights that took place in the year 1998.

== Events ==
=== February ===
- 10 – Voters in the US state of Maine reject a law enacted in 1997 banning sexual orientation discrimination in the private sector with 51.5 percent against.

=== May ===
- 21 – The House of Representatives of Cyprus repeals Section 171 of the Criminal Code, which used to criminalize homosexual acts between consenting male adults.
- 28 - U.S. President Bill Clinton signs Executive Order 13087 to prohibit discrimination based on sexual orientation in the competitive service of the federal civilian workforce.

=== September ===
- 23 – The United States Court of Appeals for the Second Circuit in Abel v. United States of America rules that the government's proffered reasons for passing "don't ask, don't tell" pass rational basis review, reversing the District Court.

=== October ===
- 6 – Matthew Shepard is beaten and pistol-whipped and tied to a fence and left to die in a gay bashing incident near Laramie, Wyoming.
- 9 - The Constitutional Court of South Africa strikes down the country's sodomy law in National Coalition for Gay and Lesbian Equality and Another v Minister of Justice and Others; the decision applies with retroactivity to April 27, 1994, the day on which the Interim Constitution came into force.
- 12 – Matthew Shepard dies from his injuries.
- 13 – The United States Supreme Court refuses an appeal in Equality Foundation of Greater Cincinnati, et al. v. The City of Cincinnati, in which the United States Court of Appeals for the Sixth Circuit had twice found the city's anti-gay Issue 3 constitutional despite the Supreme Court's ruling in Romer v. Evans that struck down a state constitutional amendment that used substantially the same language.
- 28 – In Canada, Glen Murray is elected as mayor of Winnipeg, Manitoba. He is the first openly gay man to be elected mayor of a major North American city.

=== November ===
- 3
  - Tammy Baldwin (D-WI) is elected to the United States House of Representatives. She is the first open lesbian and the first non-incumbent gay candidate to be elected to federal office.
  - Voters in Hawaii approve Amendment 2, giving the Hawaii State Legislature the power to restrict marriage to mixed-sex couples.
- 20 – In the U.S. state of Texas, John Lawrence and Tyrone Garner are fined US$125 each after being arrested for having sex in their home. They refuse to pay the fine, resulting in a challenge of the Texas sodomy law which would eventually lead to the 2003 nationwide repeal of sodomy laws in Lawrence v. Texas.
- 23 – The Supreme Court of the U.S. state of Georgia rules 6 to 1 to invalidate that state's sodomy law.
- 28 – In Allston, Massachusetts, transgender woman of color Rita Hester is murdered. The ensuing candlelight vigil a few days later was attended by 250 people and inspired the Transgender Day of Remembrance, observed each Nov 20 worldwide.

=== December ===
- 1 – Officials in Miami, Florida, vote 7–6 to prohibit discrimination based on sexual orientation in employment and housing.
- 18 – The Maryland Court of Appeals rules that a parent's access to his or her children cannot be restricted due to his or her sexual orientation.
- 22 – In New Zealand, Minister of Immigration Tuariki Delamere announces equality for gay and lesbian couples applying for permanent residency, to take effect on March 29, 1999.

== Notable deaths ==
- October 12 – Matthew Shepard, 21, gay-bashing victim
- November 28 – Rita Hester, transgender murder victim
- November 30 – Simon Nkoli, South African gay-rights and anti-apartheid activist. He was one of the "first Black anti-apartheid activists to publicly identify as gay and HIV-positive".

== See also ==
- Timeline of LGBT history – timeline of events from 12,000 BCE to present
- LGBT rights by country or territory – current legal status around the world
- LGBT social movements
