= Equality Federation =

American non-profit-organization

- United States
- Founded: 1997
- Location: San Francisco, California
- Key people: Fran Hutchins, executive director
- Employees: 8
- Website: equalityfederation.org

Equality Federation is a social justice, advocacy and capacity building organization serving and supporting state-based lesbian, gay, bisexual and transgender (LGBTQ) advocacy organizations in the United States.

== History ==
In 1997, a group of state-based LGBT advocacy organizations came together to form the Equality Federation, which originally operated as a volunteer-run coalition. In 2005, Toni Broaddus joined the Federation as its first executive director, transitioning it to a staffed organization. In 2010, the Federation was a staff of four when Broaddus stepped down. After a nationwide search, the board of directors hired Rebecca Isaacs as the organization's second executive director in 2011. It was declared in December 2020 that Fran Hutchins would be succeeding Rebecca as the third execute director, starting January 2021.

== Structure ==
The Equality Federation is an umbrella group of two separate non-profit organizations. The Equality Federation is a 501(c)(4) membership organization serving organizations who advocate for LGBT equality in nearly all 50 states. The Equality Federation Institute is a 501(c)(3) organization with programs in leadership development, policy advocacy, and organizational development.

The Equality Federation staff is distributed across the United States.

== Programs ==
Equality Federation's programs focus on leadership development, policy advocacy, and organizational development.

=== Leadership development ===
Equality Federation staff provide coaching and mentoring to new and experienced executive directors, offer training for staff and board of advocacy organizations, and operate an internship program to connect young people with statewide organizations.

The organization also hosts two annual events: the New Executive Director Boot Camp and the Summer Meeting. The New Executive Director Boot Camp is attended by new organization leaders for two days of in-depth training. The Summer Meeting provides state-based organization leaders with the opportunity to collaborate and develop working relationships.

=== Organizational development ===
Equality Federation's organizational development program focuses on strengthening member organizations to ensure they're sustainable and strategically positioned to advance public policy changes.

The program's offerings include strategic planning services (organizational, advocacy, and fundraising plans), executive search support, and access to online services. The organization also works to create partnerships within and across regions. The Southern Cohort convenes annually at the Southern Leadership Summit to share best practices and form partnerships for working in the Southern United States. Similarly, the Midwest Cohort meets at the Midwest Leadership Summit to strategize for the Midwestern United States.

=== Policy advocacy ===
The organization's policy program assists state-based organizations with their public policy advocacy efforts.

The State Equality Fund (a philanthropic partnership that includes the Evelyn and Walter Haas, Jr. Fund, Ford Foundation, the Gill Foundation, and anonymous donors) works with the Equality Federation to build support for passage of statewide nondiscrimination laws in Ohio and Pennsylvania. The organization has worked with a number of state-based organizations to develop plans after their state allows same-sex marriage. Equality Federation has also formed a partnership with the GSA Network to advance safe school policies in five states.

== Membership ==
Equality Federation serves statewide LGBT advocacy organizations in the United States, including:

- Alaskans Together for Equality
- Basic Rights Oregon
- Empire State Pride Agenda (New York, disbanded)
- Equal Rights Washington
- Equality Alabama
- Equality Arizona
- Equality California
- Equality Florida
- Equality Hawaii
- Equality Illinois
- EqualityMaine
- Equality Maryland
- Equality Michigan
- OutNebraska
- Silver State Equality (Nevada)
- Equality New Mexico
- Equality North Carolina
- Equality Ohio
- Equality Pennsylvania
- Equality South Dakota
- Equality Texas
- Equality Utah
- Equality Virginia
- Fair Wisconsin
- Fairness Campaign (Kentucky)
- Fairness West Virginia
- Freedom Oklahoma
- Forum for Equality (Louisiana)
- Garden State Equality (New Jersey)
- Gender Justice League (Washington)
- Georgia Equality
- Indiana Equality
- Lesbian, Gay, Bisexual & Transgender Community Center
- Louisiana Trans Advocates
- Massachusetts Transgender Political Coalition
- MassEquality (Massachusetts)
- New York Association for Gender Rights Advocacy
- One Colorado
- One Iowa
- OutFront Minnesota
- PROMO (Missouri)
- Tennessee Equality Project
- Tennessee Transgender Political Coalition
- TransOhio
- Transgender Education Network of Texas
- Wyoming Equality

== See also ==
- LGBT rights in the United States
- LGBT history in the United States
- List of LGBT rights organizations
