= American Military Partner Association =

American LGBTQ military organization

The American Military Partner Association
- Founded: 2009
- Dissolved: 2019
- Location: Washington, D.C.
- Key people: Stephen Peters, Founder and President Emeritus Ashley Broadway, most recent President Jim Cassidy, Founding Board Member
- Website: www.militarypartners.org
- Formerly called: Campaign for Military Partners
- Note: This organization later merged into Modern Military Association of America (MMAA) in 2019.

The American Military Partner Association (AMPA) was a non-profit organization for the partners, spouses, and families of America's LGBT service members and veterans.

AMPA traced its roots to the "Campaign for Military Partners," an organization founded by the same-sex partners of service members and sponsored by Servicemembers United (SU). With the close of SU following the repeal of "Don't Ask, Don't Tell" (DADT), in 2012, Stephen Peters organized AMPA into an independent non-profit, non-partisan 501(c)(3) organization in Washington, DC. Ashley Broadway, the spouse of an active duty soldier, and Jim Cassidy, the spouse of an active duty sailor, joined Stephen as founding board members.

In May 2019, AMPA merged with OutServe-SLDN to form the Modern Military Association of America — a united voice for the LGBTQ military and veteran community. MMAA carries on the missions of both AMPA and OutServe-SLDN through education, advocacy, and support for LGBTQ service members, veterans, military spouses, family members and allies.

== About ==
AMPA was committed to connecting LGBT military families, supporting them through the challenges of military service, honoring them for their commitment to our country, and serving them by advocating on their behalf.

- Connecting:

Through the nation’s largest private online support network for same-sex military partners/spouses designed to create a supportive and educational environment.
Through national and local events around the country designed to build a support network to bring together LGBT military families in a positive environment to foster communication and mutual support.
Through the AMPA New Military Spouse Mentor Program designed to connect new military partners and spouses to more experienced ones who can help guide them on their new journey in serving our nation.

- Supporting:

Through local and national educational events designed to inform and support military families.
Through online virtual support designed to educate on specific needs.
By educating military families on resources available to them.

- Honoring:

By highlighting LGBT military families and the challenges they face in the AMPA Faces of Our Families project.
Through community service projects like AMPA Care Package Drives.
By giving voice to the unique perspective of LGBT military families through the AMPA Military Partners Blog.

- Serving:

By advocating and educating on behalf of LGBT military families in public policy, highlighting their unique needs and challenges.
By encouraging the expansion of resource and support services available to LGBT military families.
By educating the public through stories in national, regional, and local media on the plight of gay military partners/spouses and families.

== Activities ==
Since its founding, the organization:

- Highlighted the discrimination LGBT military partners and families face by successfully pitching dozens of stories to national, regional, and local media.
- Created a home on the web for the LGBT military family community that provides a list of available resources, a military partner blog, and a guide to media coverage of issues related to LGBT military families.
- Surveyed the military partner community for the first time about the unique challenges and issues they face and present those results to the Pentagon.
- Facilitated the first meeting between Pentagon officials and the partners of active duty gay and lesbian service members.
- Held the first Military Partners Forum in Washington, D.C.
- Initiated a Military Partner Brunch series in Washington, D.C., and San Diego, California, with plans to expand the series into other cities across the country.
- Created a private social network exclusively for the partners and spouses of LGBT service members.

In December 2012, when the same-sex spouse of a U.S. Army officer was denied membership in the Association of Bragg Officers' Spouses at Fort Bragg, she reported her experience on the AMPA website.

In June 2014, the Department of Veterans Affairs (VA) announced that it would only provide benefits to the same-sex spouses of veterans who either (1) married in the state in which they resided or (2) live in a state that recognizes their marriage when they apply for benefits. On August 18, the AMPA filed an appeal in the U.S. Court of Appeals for the Federal Circuit challenging the VA's interpretation of federal law. Their brief cited Windsor and many federal court decisions since Windsor that have held denial of marriage rights to same-sex couples unconstitutional. It said the VA's policy ruling "imports into federal law unconstitutional state definitions of marital status."

== Events ==
In its effort to connect LGBT military partners and spouses around the country, the American Military Partner Association held local social events to bring military partners face-to-face with others in the same situation for mutual support and encouragement. For LGBT military partners and spouses who were not near major military bases where these events occurred, a private online social network was established to help connect partners/spouses in remote locations to build camaraderie and mutual support.
