= Bob Oke =

American politician

Robert "Bob" Oke (September 4, 1940 - May 14, 2007) was an American politician who served 16 years in the Washington State Senate representing portions of Kitsap County, Washington. A member of the Republican Party, he is credited with championing construction of a second Tacoma Narrows Bridge and for his work on youth smoking prevention.

Oke was born in Spokane and raised in Seattle. Prior to his 1990 election to the senate, he was a career seaman in the U.S. Navy, retiring as a senior chief petty officer. Well-liked by both Democratic and Republican colleagues in the legislature, Oke was interred with military honors at Tahoma National Cemetery in a memorial attended by Governor of Washington Christine Gregoire, Rep. Norm Dicks, and at least half-a-dozen sitting and former state legislators. Following Oke's death, the Washington Department of Fish and Wildlife's Lewis County Game Farm was renamed the Bob Oke Game Farm in his memory.

Oke opposed Washington House Bill 2661, which bans various forms of LGBTQ discrimination, on biblical grounds.
