= Alaskans Together for Equality =

American advocacy organization

- The Alaskans Together for Equality logo

- U.S. State of Alaska
- Founded: January 2007
- Location: Anchorage, Alaska
- Region served: Alaska
- Website: www.alaskanstogether.org
- Formerly called: Alaskans Together

Alaskans Together for Equality is a statewide education and political advocacy organization in Alaska that advocates for lesbian, gay, bisexual, and transgender (LGBTQ) rights, including same-sex marriage.

== History ==
Alaskans Together for Equality began in January 2007 as Alaskans Together, a ballot measure committee organized to oppose an advisory vote intended to deny public employees access to same-sex partner benefits. Following the vote, the organization adopted its current structure.

== Structure ==
Alaskans Together for Equality is a 501(c)(4) nonprofit organization which lobbies at the local, state, and federal levels of government on LGBT issues.

Alaskans Together Foundation, Inc. is a 501(c)(3) nonprofit organization which educates the public on LGBT issues.

== Activities ==
Alaskans Together for Equality endorses candidates for political office and engages in lobbying on LGBT rights.

Alaskans Together Foundation, Inc. coordinates public awareness campaigns on LGBT issues.

The organization is a member of the Equality Federation.

== See also ==
- LGBT rights in Alaska
- List of LGBT rights organizations
- Same-sex marriage in Alaska
