= OutNebraska =

- U.S. State of Nebraska
- Predecessor: Nebraska Coalition for Gay and Lesbian Civil Rights
- Formation: 2009
- Headquarters: Lincoln, Nebraska
- Location: 211 N 14th St
- Region served: Nebraska
- Methods: Lobbying, community organizing, community events, education
- Executive Director: Abbi Swatsworth
- Affiliations: Equality Federation, Community Services Fund of Nebraska
- Website: outnebraska.org
- Formerly called: Outlinc

OutNebraska is a Nebraska statewide LGBTQ advocacy, lobbying, and community organization.

== History ==
A Lincoln, Nebraska LGBTQ community organization was incorporated as Outlinc in 2009. It expanded to a statewide organization and changed its name to OutNebraska in 2019.

== Community events ==
=== Prairie Pride Film Festival ===
OutNebraska sponsors the Prairie Pride Film Festival, which has brought independent films on LGBTQ themes to Nebraska since 2010.

=== Let's Go Birding Together ===
OutNebraska hosts birdwatching events in warm weather months. Let's Go Birding Together ("LGBT") events are a partnership with Spring Creek Prairie Audubon Center.

== Advocacy and organizing ==
OutNebraska opposed Nebraska's prohibition on same-sex marriage.

OutNebraska has advocated for a state law protecting LGBT people from employment and housing discrimination, expressing skepticism that city-level laws are comprehensive enough.

OutNebraska joined the ACLU in 2016 in providing training to help poll workers identify transgender and gender nonconforming Nebraska voters.

== Partnerships ==
OutNebraska is affiliated with the Equality Federation and the Community Services Fund of Nebraska.

In expanding from Lincoln into a statewide organization, OutNebraska partnered with Panhandle Equality, an advocacy group in the Nebraska Panhandle.

== Controversies ==
In 2021, OutNebraska (along with Nebraska chapter of Drag Queen Story Hour) rented out Lincoln Children’s Museum to host an after-hours Drag Queen storytelling session with about 50 registered attendees. The event was not affiliated or sponsored by Lincoln Children’s Hospital.

After details of the event circulated online via social media posts, critics accused the organizers and the museum of exposing children to inappropriate, hyper-sexualized, or non-traditional expressions of gender and sexuality, with some online commenters alleging "indoctrination".

The museum cancelled the public portion of the event, citing safety concerns for staff, visitors, and the building.

== See also ==
- LGBT rights in Nebraska
- PROMO
- One Iowa
