= Washington House Bill 2661 =

Washington state law for LGBTQ rights

Washington House Bill 2661 is a Washington state law which bans employment, insurance and housing discrimination against LGBT individuals, passed by the Washington State Legislature on January 27, 2006, and signed into law by Governor Christine Gregoire four days later. The bill went into effect on June 8, 2006.

== Summary ==
- Expanded the jurisdiction of the human rights commission to include sexual orientation and gender expression or identity as a basis for prohibiting discrimination.
- Added definitions for sexual orientation and gender expression or identity to Washington's Law Against Discrimination.
- Exempted from Washington's Law Against Discrimination those real estate transactions that include the sharing, rental, or sublease of a dwelling unit when the dwelling unit is to be occupied by the owner or sublessor.

== History and Prior Legislation ==
Employment discrimination based on sexual orientation in state agencies and higher education institutions was previously prohibited by executive orders issued by Governor Booth Gardner in 1985 and again in 1991. House Bill 2661 extended employment discrimination protections to both public and private sectors.

Multiple "gay rights" bills had been proposed in Washington State, starting in 1977, and this bill was considered "long-awaited". Washington State politician Cal Anderson proposed a bill extending discrimination protections to LGBTQ people every year he was a legislator, from 1987 until his death in 1995. One of Anderson's sexual orientation anti-discrimination bills passed in the House in 1994, but failed to pass in the Senate by a single vote.

== Senate Floor Record ==
Immediately prior to the vote on this bill, multiple senators came forward to make statements about the bill.

I believe homosexuality is morally wrong. It's through God's eyes that I see homosexuality, and to Him homosexuality is an abomination... The bill's goal is to teach that choosing homosexuality is OK, and I'm deeply, deeply, deeply troubled by that. I can't support that. How many parents would choose this lifestyle for their children?... By passing a law that makes homosexuality a protected behavior, we are turning our backs on the people who need our love, guidance, and understanding to become right in God's eyes... I wish with all my heart that they will find truth and change. But I fear this bill will greatly hinder their journey to the truth.

— State Senator Bob Oke,

As an African American woman, and one who knows discrimination... I cannot discriminate against anyone. In high school there was a classmate of mine, many many years ago, before homosexuality was ever mentioned. In fact, there were two... They were treated very, very badly. They were called "faggots", they were called "girly", they were called horrible names... And that happened in segregated schools... And that experience, that transpires in todays world, should not happen... This bill simply extends human rights protection, civil liberties, to a group of people who pay their taxes, who work hard every day, who contribute to society, who should have the same rights as each of us do in this chamber. It's not special privileges.

— State Senator Rosa Franklin,

It's a sad day for me especially, because I remember fourteen years ago, when this bill was being debated, the crowd was so large that it couldn't be held in the hearing room; they had to move the debate to the house floor, where the people were allowed to fill our seats as the audience, as this was being debated. We defeated it then, because of its very nature and what it would mean for the State of Washington. Nothing has changed. The reasons that we defeated it then are still the same reasons today.

— State Senator Val Stevens,

I think... what the debate is about... is whether or not it is OK to be gay or homosexual in the State [of Washington]... We don't choose who we love. The heart chooses who it will love. ...those people are being sent a message, from a lot of parts of society, and sometimes I think from this legislature, that who their heart chooses to love is wrong, and they are wrong, and they are immoral. And I don't believe that's true.

— State Senator Bill Finkbeiner,

Passing this bill will allow Washington to join the community of states around this country who have said that we can no longer treat gays and lesbians like second-class citizens. We will be joining: Alaska, Arizona, California, Colorado, Connecticut, Delaware, Hawaii, Illinois, Indiana, Kentucky, Louisiana, Maine, Maryland, Massachusetts, Michigan, Minnesota, Montana, Nevada, New Hampshire, New Jersey, New Mexico, New York, Ohio, Oregon, Pennsylvania, Rhode Island, Vermont, Washington [D.C.], and Wisconsin.

— State Senator Brian Weinstein,

Mr. President I believe this legislation is unnecessary... because homosexuals do not meet the three criteria that courts have historically used to characterize minority groups in need of protection: economic deprivation, political powerlessness, and immutable characteristics. Homosexuals have in many cases and probably on average... higher incomes, better jobs, higher education levels, drive better cars and have better houses... It's unnecessary because there's not a record of government-sanctioned systemic discrimination... It's unwise to dilute previous civil rights protections that this state has granted... We can't compare this with laws that were designed to protect people being denied the right to vote, the right to sit where they wanted to on a bus, the right to patronize a restaurant, and the right not to be rounded up by the government and placed in holding camps.

I'll give you an example of what I consider to be reasonable accommodation: my wife works at Macy's... and they have a transvestite that comes in. And he'll pick out some clothes and try to slip into the women's dressing room. And when they see him going in they'll always say: "I'm sorry but you need to use the men's dressing room." They don't tell him he can't try on those clothes... but they do draw the distinction that men go in the men's dressing room and women go in the women's dressing room. What happens with this bill? Is he being discriminated against, because he doesn't get full enjoyment of the facilities?

— State Senator Brad Benson,

We don't really know about economic deprivation or political powerlessness because so many people are afraid to come forward with their sexual orientation. How would we even scientifically know that?

— State Senator Lisa Brown,

== See also ==
- Equal Rights Washington - key organization that pushed for this bill's passage
- List of US ballot initiatives to repeal LGBT anti-discrimination laws
