= LGBTQ rights in Washington (state) =

- Washington (US)
- Legal status: Legal since 1976
- Gender identity: Transgender people allowed to change legal gender, surgery not required
- Discrimination protections: Sexual orientation and gender identity or expression protected

Family rights
- Recognition of relationships: Same-sex marriage since 2012; Domestic partnership since 2007
- Adoption: Same-sex couples permitted to adopt

The State of Washington is seen as one of the most progressive states in the United States in regard to lesbian, gay, bisexual, transgender, and queer (LGBTQ) rights, with jurisprudence having evolved significantly since the late 20th century. Same-sex sexual activity was legalized in 1976. LGBTQ people are fully protected from discrimination in the areas of employment, housing and public accommodations. The state enacted comprehensive anti-discrimination legislation regarding sexual orientation and gender identity in 2006. Same-sex marriage has been legal since 2012, and same-sex couples are allowed to adopt. Conversion therapy on minors has also been illegal since 2018.

Washington is frequently referred to as one of the United States's most LGBTQ-friendly states, and its largest city Seattle has a thriving LGBTQ community, ranked as the fifth largest in the country. Opinion polling has shown that a majority of Washingtonians support same-sex marriage and LGBTQ rights. A 2019 survey from the Public Religion Research Institute showed that 74% of residents supported anti-discrimination laws protecting LGBTQ people. In November 2012, voters approved a same-sex marriage law in Referendum 74.

== History ==
Several Native American tribes in modern-day Washington recognize individuals who act, behave and live as the opposite gender, now referred to as "two-spirit". Among the Quileute people, such individuals are known as yah'wa.

In 2020, the Washington State Legislature established an LGBT coordinator within the Washington Department of Veterans Affairs. The legislation to this effect also allows LGBT veterans who received a dishonorable discharge under Don't Ask, Don't Tell to have that discharge changed, and ensures that those veterans and their families have access to veteran benefits.

In March 2024, Governor Jay Inslee signed a bill that would add LGBT history to the state school curriculum, as part of other updates and changes intended to make it more representative and inclusive of minorities.

In February 2025, the city council of Olympia passed a resolution declaring itself a "sanctuary city" for LGBTQ people. The first declaration of its kind in Washington, it includes commitments (on top of protections already present in state law) to the "equal and dignified treatment" of LGBTQ residents at the municipal level.

=== Legality of same-sex sexual activity ===
After being created from the northern portion of the Oregon Territory in 1853, the newly-created Washington Territory adopted all its laws from Oregon. At the time, the Oregon Territory did not criminalize sodomy (it did, however, enact a sodomy law later that year). The Washington Territory thus did not possess a sodomy law at its creation, nor did it ever pass one later on; the Washington Territory being one of the few United States territories never to criminalize sodomy. In 1893, shortly after statehood, in the case of State v. Place, the Washington Supreme Court took note of the absence of a sodomy law. The Washington State Legislature acted swiftly, enacting Washington's first ever sodomy law only 19 days after the Place ruling. It prohibited "crimes against nature" with ten to fourteen years' imprisonment. Over the following years, the courts convicted multiple people of sodomy, though also rejected some cases due to lack of evidence. As was the case for sodomy laws around the country at the time, the law punished both heterosexual and homosexual conduct and criminalized fellatio (oral sex) and anal intercourse.

Washington enacted a sterilization law in 1909, permitting "habitual criminals" to be forcefully sterilized. The only known person to be sterilized under the law was a (heterosexual) man in 1912 accused of statutory rape, though he was later found innocent of the crime. The law was amended in 1921, providing for the "possible sterilization of [...] moral degenerates and sexual perverts". The Washington Supreme Court struck down the law as unconstitutional in 1942, holding that the "mental condition [of the accused] did not allow them fully to understand the nature of the notice". Those convicted of sodomy were further defined as "sexual psychopaths" under a 1949 psychopathic offender law. In 1953, the Supreme Court ruled that non-penetrative sex could not be considered sodomy, and in 1967, in the case of State v. Rhinehart, upheld the sodomy law as constitutional. The defendant, Keith Rhinehart, challenged the law as a violation of his right to privacy and on the grounds of vagueness and the establishment of religion, though the Court held that these contentions had "no merit". In 1972, a same-sex couple holding hands at a Seattle skating rink were arrested, resulting in protests and renewed debate surrounding the sodomy law.

Washington repealed its laws that criminalized consensual sodomy in June 1975, effective on July 1, 1976. Initially, the age of consent was different for heterosexual and homosexual conduct, though was unified in 1988 at 16.

== Recognition of same-sex relationships ==
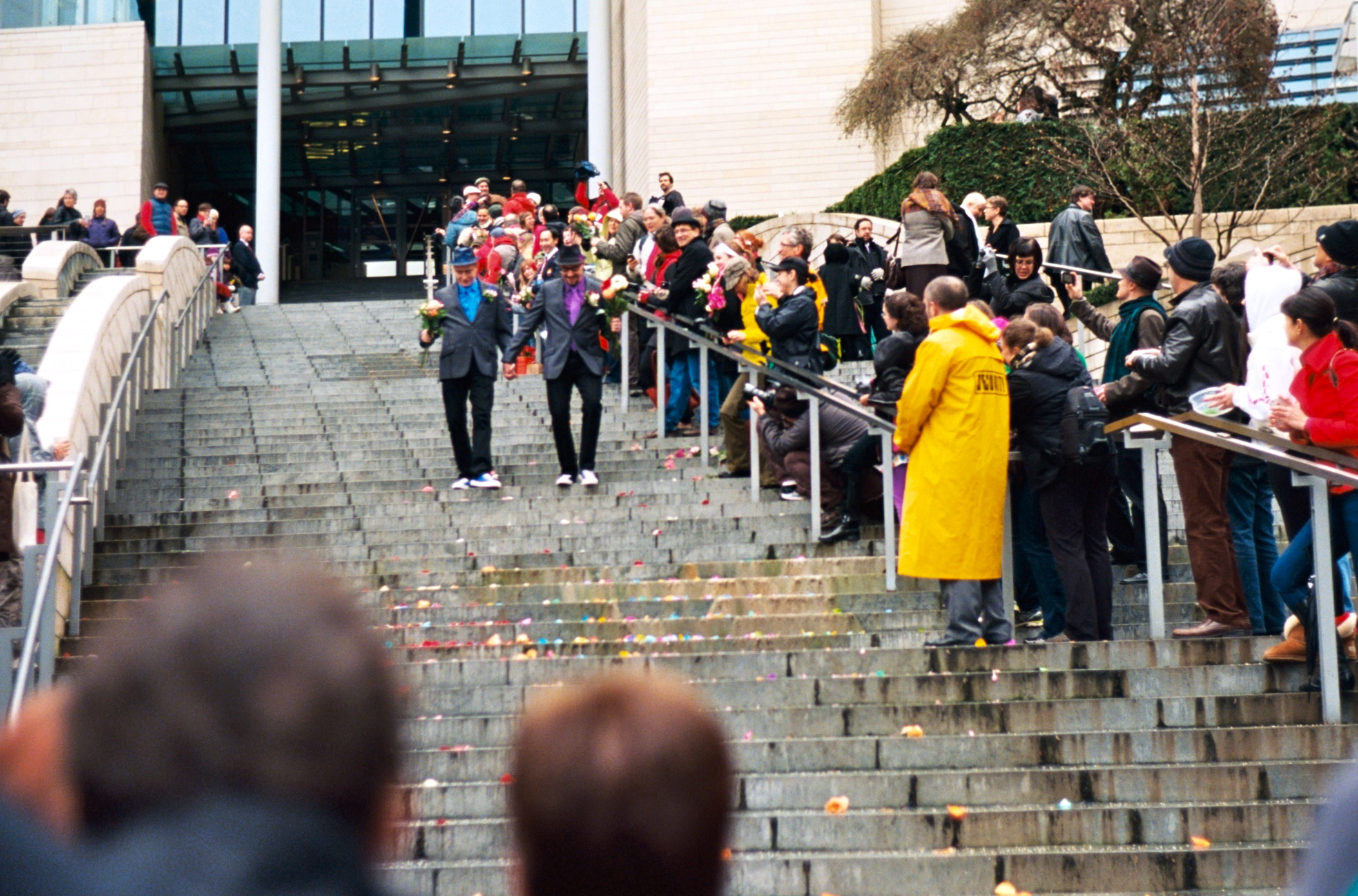
A newly married couple leaving Seattle City Hall is greeted by well-wishers on the first day same-sex marriages are celebrated in Washington state, December 9, 2012.

Since 2001, Washington state has provided benefits to same-sex partners of state employees.

The state adopted a statute defining marriage as the union of a man and a woman in 1998. On August 4, 2004, King County Superior Court Judge William L. Downing ruled for the plaintiffs in a suit challenging the constitutionality of the law, becoming the first trial judge in the nation to rule that a state law prohibiting same-sex marriages, or DOMA, was unconstitutional. Downing's opinion analyzed the impact on children and found that expanding marriage rights to same-sex couples would do nothing to harm children of opposite-sex marriages while harming the stability of children raised by same-sex couples. In the 2006 consolidated appeal of Andersen v. King County, the Washington Supreme Court narrowly upheld the constitutionality of that law barring same-sex marriages. Since 2007, Washington state has recognized its own state-registered domestic partnerships, which are considered equivalent to the domestic partnerships, civil unions, and marriages of same-sex couples in other jurisdictions. It has also recognized same-sex civil unions and domestic partnerships established in other jurisdictions since then.

Since 2011, Washington state has recognized same-sex marriages performed elsewhere as the equivalent of its own domestic partnerships.

In August 2011, the Suquamish Tribe of Washington State legally recognized same-sex marriages. The tribe may issue marriage licenses for two unmarried adults regardless of sex or gender, so long as one of the adults is a member of the Suquamish Tribe.

Governor Christine Gregoire signed a law authorizing same-sex marriages on February 13, 2012, but opponents gathered enough signatures to force a voter referendum on the legislation. Voters approved the law in the November election by a margin of 54% to 46%. Same-sex marriages have been recognized by the state since that law took effect on December 6. The law also provided that Washington's registered domestic partnerships convert automatically to marriages on June 30, 2014, if not dissolved before that date.

=== Federal income tax ===
The Internal Revenue Service ruled in May 2010 that its rules governing communal property income for married couples extend to couples who file taxes in a community property state that recognizes domestic partnerships or same-sex marriages. Couples with registered domestic partnerships in Washington, a community property state, must first combine their annual income and then each must claim half that amount as his or her income for federal tax purposes. However, filing such returns precludes electronic filing, and Washington has no state income tax independently justifying a complex filing. In certain circumstances, the IRS allows affected couples to disregard community property rules. Since April 2011, Washington has recognized same-sex marriages performed in other jurisdictions as equivalent to its domestic partnerships, with the result that community property rules now apply to these couples as well, when residing in Washington.

== Adoption and parenting ==
Washington state law permits a legally competent adult to petition to adopt without respect to marital status. Same-sex couples can adopt jointly and can arrange second-parent adoptions as well.

Lesbian couples are allowed to access in vitro fertilisation. State law recognizes the non-genetic, non-gestational mother as a legal parent to a child born via donor insemination, irrespective of the marital status of the parents. Commercial surrogacy has been legal in Washington since January 1, 2019. Couples, regardless of their gender, marital status or sexual orientation, may undertake surrogacy arrangements.

Previously, the state recognized and enforced custody decrees from other countries in child custody cases–even if those decrees stemmed from foreign laws criminalizing homosexuality. In April 2021, a bill passed the Washington State Legislature (passing the House by a vote of 96–2 and the Senate by 49 votes to 0) to protect families from facing the death penalty in certain foreign jurisdictions on the basis of their religious beliefs, political beliefs or sexual orientation. The legislation allows the state to ignore state law if it would subject parents and children to such foreign laws. Governor Jay Inslee signed the bill into law on April 14.

== Discrimination protections ==
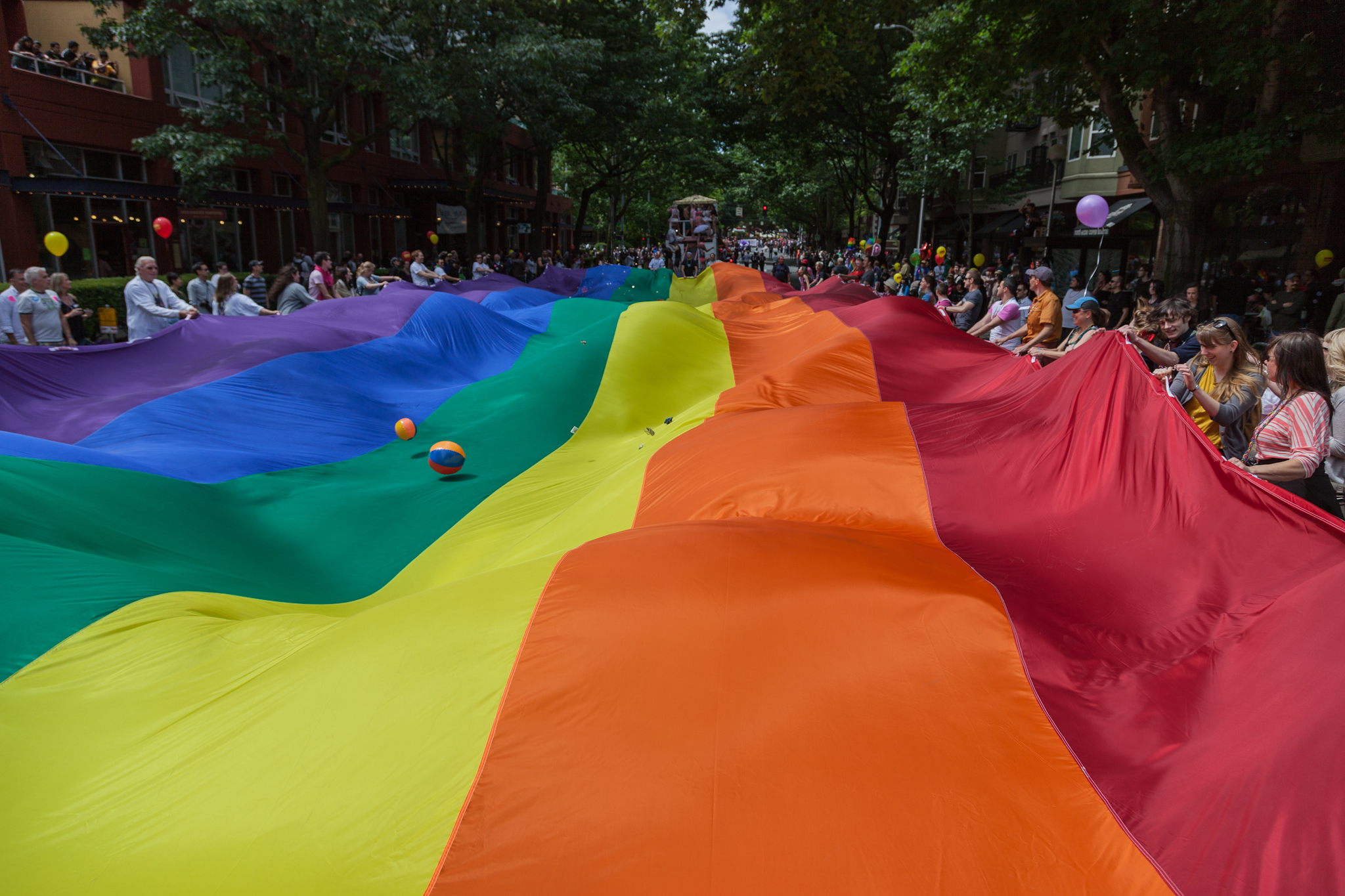
Participants waving a rainbow flag at the 2012 Seattle Pride parade

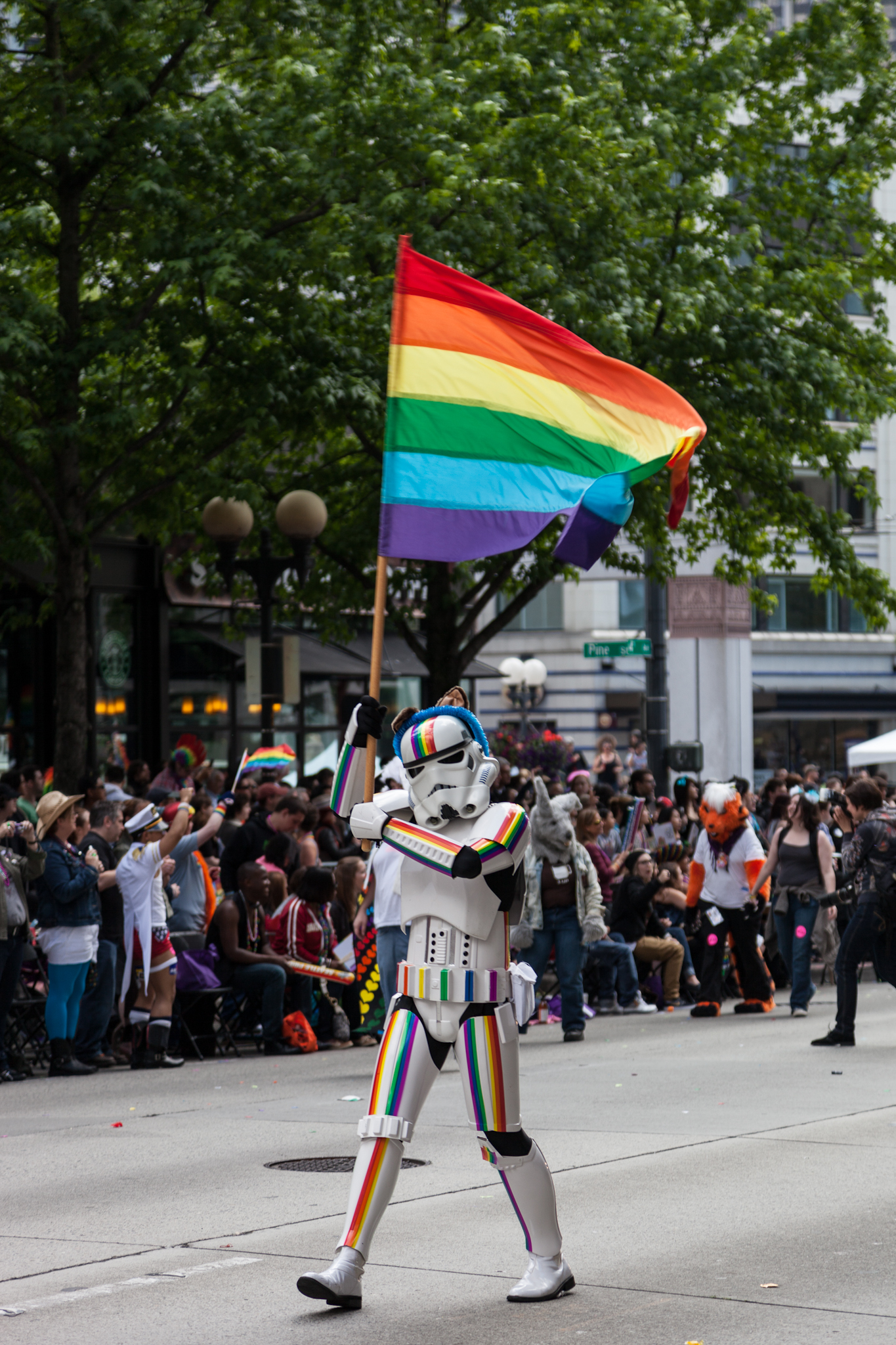
Seattle Pride parade 2012

Washington state law currently prohibits discrimination based on sexual orientation and gender identity or expression. These protections were added to Washington's Law Against Discrimination (RCW 49.60) in 2006 with Washington House Bill 2661, signed into law by Governor Christine Gregoire, a member of the Democratic Party. This bill was considered "long-awaited", as various "gay rights" bills had been proposed since 1977. Cal Anderson proposed a bill extending discrimination protections to LGBTQ people every year he was a legislator, from 1987 until his death in 1995. One of Cal Anderson's sexual orientation anti-discrimination bills passed in the House in 1994, but failed to pass in the Senate by a single vote. Employment discrimination based on sexual orientation in state agencies and higher education institutions was prohibited by executive orders issued by Governor Booth Gardner in 1985 and again in 1991. From June 1, 2027 by a unanimous vote the City of Seattle will explicitly add “relationship status” and “multiple human partnerships” to anti-discrimination policies and procedures - that is also alongside sexual orientation and gender identity provisions.

Moreover, the state's anti-bullying law prohibits bullying on the basis of sex, race, creed, religion, color, national origin, sexual orientation, gender expression, gender identity, honorably discharged veteran or military status, presence of any sensory, mental or physical disability, or use of a trained dog guide or service animal. The law also explicitly includes cyberbullying and harassment, and applies to all public schools and public charter schools.

On March 7, 2014, Mark Zmuda filed a lawsuit in King County Superior Court against Eastside Catholic School and the Archdiocese of Seattle charging illegal termination of his employment as an assistant principal and swimming coach at the school in December 2013 after his same-sex marriage entered into the previous July became known to school officials. The Archdiocese was named as a defendant because it has no direct authority over the school but, according to the complaint, ordered his dismissal.

Arlene's Flowers in Richland was fined $1,000 in February 2015 for violating the state's anti-discrimination law for refusing to provide flowers for a same-sex wedding. In February 2017, the fine was unanimously upheld by the Washington Supreme Court, which held that the florist had no right under the U.S. Constitution's Free Exercise Clause or Free Speech Cause to refuse services to the couple due to her religious beliefs.

=== Protections for gender non-conformity ===
In 1989, the US Supreme Court ruled that gender stereotyping constitutes sex discrimination under Title VII of the Civil Rights Act of 1964 (and is therefore unlawful) in their ruling on the case Price Waterhouse v. Hopkins. This ruling did not impede the Washington State Supreme Court from ruling en banc in Jane Doe v. Boeing Company in 1993 that Boeing was within their rights to fire a transgender Jane Doe engineer for wearing a pink pearl necklace to work. Boeing claims she was in violation of the unwritten dress policy, which (at the time) restricted her to wear "either male clothing or unisex clothing" at work, until such time as she underwent "sex reassignment surgery". Boeing claims this dress code applied equally to all employees, including "eight other transsexuals who had expressed a desire to have sex reassignment surgery while working for Boeing". In this case, the Jane Doe accused Boeing of discriminating against her gender dysphoria under the Law Against Discrimination, not discriminating against her sex, so the State Supreme Court did not consider the Hopkins ruling.

In the early 2000s the United States Court of Appeals for the Ninth Circuit made multiple rulings which held that discrimination based upon gender non-conformity is illegal nationwide under Title VII and the Gender Motivated Violence Act, in cases such as Schwenk v. Hartford in 2000, Nichols v. Azteca Restaurant Enterprises in 2001, and Rene v. MGM Grand Hotel, Inc. in 2002.

In 2006, Washington House Bill 2661 amended the Law Against Discrimination to explicitly prevent discrimination against "gender expression or identity", which was defined therein as: "having or being perceived as having a gender identity, self-image, appearance, behavior, or expression, whether or not that gender identity, self image, appearance, behavior, or expression is different from that traditionally associated with the sex assigned to that person at birth".

=== Washington state LGBTQ commission ===
In April 2019, the Washington State Legislature passed a bill to establish the Washington state LGBTQ commission, which will "work with state agencies to develop and implement policies to address the needs of the community". The bill passed the House by a vote of 67–28 and the Senate by a vote of 30–16. The Governor signed the bill into law on May 13, 2019 and it went into effect on July 28, 2019.

=== Demographic reporting in hospitals ===
Since January 1, 2023, all acute care hospitals and behavioral health hospitals in Washington State are required to "gather and report additional patient demographic information" as part of patient discharge reporting, via voluntary patient disclosures. This demographic information explicitly includes both sexual orientation and gender identity. California has very similar legislation enacted.

=== Arlene's Flowers lawsuit ===
The Arlene's Flowers lawsuit was a group of merged civil suits brought against Arlene's Flowers of Richland, Washington, US, by a couple whose longtime florist declined service of their same-sex wedding, represented by the American Civil Liberties Union (ACLU), and by Washington Attorney General Bob Ferguson. The lawsuits gained national attention due to their religious and civil rights implications.

The first two legal cases, Ingersoll v. Arlene's Flowers and State of Washington v. Arlene's Flowers, were consolidated by Benton County Superior Court Judge Salvador Mendoza into a single case for purposes of discovery. On November 15, 2016, state Attorney General Ferguson personally argued the case before the Washington Supreme Court; the hearing was held before an audience at an auditorium on the campus of Bellevue College. On February 16, 2017, the state Supreme Court unanimously ruled against Stutzman, holding that her floral arrangements do not constitute protected free speech, and that providing flowers to a same-sex wedding would not serve as an endorsement of same-sex marriage. Rejecting Stutzman's Free Exercise Clause claim, Justice Sheryl Gordon McCloud wrote, "this case is no more about the access to flowers than civil rights cases were about access to sandwiches."

Following the state high court's decision, Stutzman filed a petition for a writ of certiorari in the Supreme Court of the United States, asking the Court to hear the case. During this case, a similar case, Masterpiece Cakeshop v. Colorado Civil Rights Commission, had made its way to the Supreme Court, and which was decided in early June 2018. The ruling was made on procedural grounds in that the bakery owner's religious views were treated with hostility by the Colorado Civil Rights Commission, and remanded that a new hearing be made. Stutzman, on this news, stated that she had also found her religious views treated with hostility by the state of Washington, and sought a similar rehearing. On June 25, 2018, the U.S. Supreme Court granted the petition for a writ of certiorari, vacated the judgment, and remanded the case to the Supreme Court of Washington for further consideration in light of the Masterpiece Cakeshop decision. On June 6, 2019, the Washington Supreme Court unanimously ruled against Stutzman again, finding no evidence of religious animus. Stutzman's attorneys once again requested the U.S. Supreme Court to take her case, but certiorari was denied in July 2021.

The Supreme Court of the United States let stand two unanimous verdicts by the Washington state Supreme Court that same-sex couples cannot be discriminated against on the basis of religious freedom. Stutzman opted to settle with Ingersoll in November 2021, paying him $5,000, as she was getting close to retirement and wanted to stop accumulating legal fees related to the case. While she had filed a petition for rehearing in September 2021 to the Supreme Court, she withdrew it following the settlement. During 2022, Stutzman sold the shop to Kim Solheim, who changed the store's policies to welcome LGBTQ+ clients.

== Hate crime law ==
Washington state law criminalizes "malicious harassment" and violence motivated by the victim's sexual orientation or gender identity and expression.

== Gay panic defense ==
In February 2020, the Washington State Legislature passed a bill to abolish the gay panic defense. House Bill 1687, also known as the Nikki Kuhnhausen Act, passed by a vote of 90–5 in the House and 46–3 in the Senate. The bill was signed into law in March 2020 by Governor Jay Inslee, and went into effect in June 2020.

== Transgender rights ==
Sex reassignment surgery is not a legal requirement to change the gender marker on official documents within Washington State. Since February 2025, individuals born within Washington State as a child or adult can legally change their sex on a birth certificate or a driving licence document with male, female or X options within three (3) business days under new policies released and implemented.

Surgery, puberty blockers, hormone replacement therapy and other transition-related healthcare for transgender people is covered under health insurance and state Medicaid policies.

Transgender people in Washington are allowed to use restrooms that correspond with their gender identity. In February 2016, the Washington State Senate voted 24–25 to reject a bill that would have repealed a new rule issued by the state's Human Rights Commission that allows transgender people to use public restrooms that correspond with their gender identity. One Democrat voted in favor of repealing the new rule, while 3 Republicans voted against repealing it. Following the bill's defeat, supporters began collecting signatures to have the issue placed on the ballot in November 2016. However, in July, it was revealed that not enough signatures had been collected.

Since January 27, 2018, the Washington State Department of Health has allowed people to register their sex as "X" on birth certificates. A similar option on driver's licenses became available on November 13, 2019.

Seattle allows single occupant restrooms in city facilities and public places to be used by any person, regardless of sex or gender identity.

Since January 1, 2022, the "Gender Affirming Treatment Act" in Washington State makes sex reassignment surgery legally covered for insurance purposes under Medicaid.

In April 2023, a bill passed both houses of the Washington State Legislature to protect and defend gender-affirming healthcare for transgender individuals within Washington state (including safe passage of transgender individuals from interstate). The Governor of Washington State signed the bill into law, effective immediately under an “emergency clause”.

In February 2025, the state joined with Oregon and Minnesota in filing a lawsuit in the District Court for the Western District of Washington, seeking to block an executive order issued by President Donald Trump to prohibit gender-affirming care for minors.

On the May 1, 2025, the city of Spokane passed a comprehensive “transgender safety and sanctuary ordinance” by a 5-2 vote.

=== Prison ===
As of October 2023, prisons within Washington state (under court order and rulings) are legally required to provide gender-affirming healthcare and/or sexual reassignment surgery to inmates.

In July 2024, a trans woman prisoner was transferred from a women’s prison to a men’s, as punishment for engaging in consensual sex with a cisgender inmate of the women’s prison.

=== Sports ===
In 2007, the Washington Interscholastic Activities Association (WIAA) adopted guidance and practices, adapted from the then-policy of the USOC and NCAA, for accommodating transgender athletes in its competitions, becoming the first U.S. state to explicitly adopt such guidance.

Due to the 2020s anti-LGBTQ movement and federal anti-LGBTQ policies adopted by the second Trump administration, Washington's pro-trans policies in school athletics began to be increasingly scrutinized in the mid-2020s. In 2025, after a student-athlete sat out of a February 2025 girls' basketball game against Shelton High School for "safety" concerns due to that team's inclusion of a trans player, the Tumwater School District controversially passed a resolution calling on the WIAA to adopt policies prohibiting trans girls from participating in girls' sports. In March 2025, the U.S. Department of Education announced an investigation into the Tumwater School District based on a complaint backed by the Foundation Against Intolerance & Racism. The complaint alleged a violation of Title IX, based on an interpretation mandated by Trump via Executive Order 14201. In May 2025, the Tumwater team was seen wearing shirts with the slogan "Keep Women's Sports Female" at the WIAA state track championships, in protest of the participation of a trans sprinter in the girls' events (where she defended her state title).

==== Initiative 638 ====
In January 2026, a petition backed by the conservative PAC Let's Go Washington was submitted to the state legislature, proposing that participation in girls' sports at K-12 schools be restricted based on biological sex as verified by healthcare providers. The legislature did not act on the petition, thus it became a ballot initiative—Initiative 638—during the 2026 elections. Initiative 638 was opposed by the PAC No Hate in WA State, which argued that it was "the most extreme measure of its kind in the country in the mechanisms by which it forces all girls to have their sex assigned at birth verified by a healthcare provider." The initiative was passed by voters, but is expected to face legal resistance and potential modifications or a repeal by the Washington State legislature.

Legal experts said the initiative would likely be challenged under the Washington Law Against Discrimination or the Washington state Constitution's equal rights amendment. Experts also expect plaintiff's to argue that the law conflicts with Washington State's anti discrimination laws due to it only applying to girls sports, but not boys sports. They also expect it to be challenged for violating the "right to privacy" in the state constitution due to its sex verification requirement. Some legal experts as well as opponents of the initiative said if the law survives a state constitutional challenge, it could lead to other aspects of state's antidiscrimination protections being rewritten. Proponents of the initiative deny this. Proponents of the initiative also pointed to the United States Supreme Court ruling upholding similar laws in Idaho and West Virginia. However, neither of those states have the robust statewide protections for transgender rights that Washington State does and that I-638 would be challenged under.

The Seattle Education Association (SEA) noted that a legal challenge would take place in Washington State courts which could overturn the measure due to it being a statutory measure. Additionally, SEA noted that a legal challenge in Washington State courts would allow them to avoid a ruling by the federal courts or the U.S. Supreme Court, which have been increasingly unfavorable to trans rights in recent years.

On November 9, 2026, the Seattle Public School Board will hold a special board meeting to vote on a resolution authorizing the school district to take legal action against the I-638.

Additionally, opponents have discussed the possibility of having the state legislature repeal the law. The Washington state Constitution allows the legislature to amend or repeal ballot initiatives with a two-thirds supermajority vote in the first two years after passing and only a simple majority vote after two years. The Washington State Senate currently lacks the two-thirds Democratic supermajority needed to repeal the law in the first two years, making a legal challenge the more likely path to overturning the initiative in the short term. Jaelynn Scott, who was elected as Washington’s first openly trans state legislator in 2026 said, "If for some reason the legal challenge doesn’t work, then in the state legislature, we damn sure are going to repeal that law in two years."

On November 5, 2026, opponents of the measure held a rally demanding the legislature take action to repeal the measure.

== Conversion therapy ==
On February 13, 2014, the Washington House of Representatives voted 94–4 in favor of a bill that would have prohibited health care providers from trying to change the sexual orientation of minors. The state Senate, controlled by the Majority Coalition Caucus, took no action on the legislation.

Another bill was introduced in 2015. It passed the Senate in March. The House then approved a modified version of the bill in a 60–37 vote. However, in April, the Senate voted 27–22 to refuse to consider the modified bill.

On August 1, 2016, Seattle voted to ban conversion therapy on minors. Councilmember Lorena González sponsored the ban, and it was unanimously approved by all other eight city councilmembers. Mayor Ed Murray signed the ordinance on August 3 and it took effect on October 2, 2016.

After Democrats took control of the Washington Senate at the end of 2017, legislation banning conversion therapy was approved 32–16 on January 19, 2018, with one senator excused from the vote. (Note: Senator Baumgartner was absent during the vote, having been formally "excused from the chamber" wholly prior to the senate addressing SB 5722 (following a request to hush conversation or continue conversing outside the chamber)) The bill then passed the state House of Representatives by a vote of 66–32, and had to go back to the Senate for another vote due to some amendments. The Senate later passed the amended bill by a vote of 33–16. Governor Jay Inslee signed it into law on March 28, 2018. The law went into effect on June 7, 2018 (i.e. 90 days after the end of the legislative term).

After the statewide ban was passed, family counselor Brian Tingley sued, claiming it violated his First Amendment rights. His challenge (represented by the Alliance Defending Freedom) was rejected in August 2021 by a federal district court judge in Tacoma, Washington. In December 2023, the U.S. Supreme Court declined to hear his appeal by denying certiorari, over the dissent of 3 justices.

== Public opinion ==
A 2022 Public Religion Research Institute poll found that 83% of Washington residents supported same-sex marriage, while 15% were opposed and 2% were unsure.

Public opinion for LGBTQ anti-discrimination laws in Washington
Poll source	Date(s) administered	Sample size	Margin of error	% support	% opposition	% no opinion
Public Religion Research Institute	January 7 - December 20, 2020	1,310	?	72%	22%	6%
Public Religion Research Institute	January 2 - December 30, 2019	1,268	?	74%	18%	8%
Public Religion Research Institute	January 3 - December 30, 2018	1,433	?	75%	19%	6%
Public Religion Research Institute	April 5 - December 23, 2017	1,762	?	73%	20%	7%
Public Religion Research Institute	April 29, 2015 - January 7, 2016	1,923	?	75%	19%	6%
Public Religion Research Institute	January 2, 2014 - January 4, 2015	1,133	?	63%	29%	8%

== Summary table ==
Same-sex sexual activity legal	Yes (Since 1976)
Equal age of consent (16)	Yes (Since 1988)
Anti-discrimination laws in employment, housing and public accommodations	Yes (Since 2006)
Anti-discrimination laws for intersex people	No
Hate crime laws inclusive of sexual orientation and gender identity	Yes
Same-sex marriages	Yes / No (Since 2012, disputed in Yakama Reservation; banned in the Lummi and Kalispel reservations since 2008 and 2017)
Recognition of same-sex couples (e.g. domestic partnerships)	Yes (Since 2007)
Stepchild and joint adoption by same-sex couples	Yes
Lesbian, gay and bisexual people allowed to serve openly in the military	Yes (Since 2011)
Transgender people allowed to serve openly in the military	(Since 2025, under an executive order)
Intersex people allowed to serve openly in the military	(Current DoD policy bans "hermaphrodites" from serving or enlisting in the military)
Right to change legal gender without sex reassignment surgery	Yes (Since 2025, with 3 business days policy implemented)
Third gender option	Yes (Since 2018 for birth certificates and since 2019 for driver's licenses)
LGBT anti-bullying law in schools	Yes
Abolition of the gay panic defense	Yes (Since 2020)
Conversion therapy banned	Yes (Since 2018)
Intersex minors protected from invasive surgical procedures	No
LGBTQ-friendly curriculums within state-based schools and classrooms	Yes (Since 2024)
Access and full parentage recognition from either IVF and surrogacy for same-sex couples	Yes
Ban on book bans implemented	Yes
MSMs allowed to donate blood	Yes

== See also ==
- Law of Washington (state)
- LGBT rights in the United States
