= Marco Antonio Roberts =

American political activist

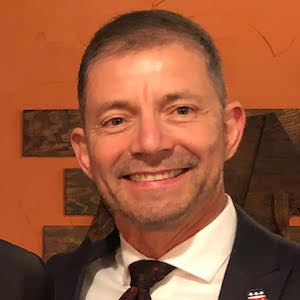
- Born: July 21, 1963 (age 63); Kinshasa, Democratic Republic of the Congo
- Education: Bachelor’s Degree in Political Science, Texas A&M University
- Occupations: Political activist, writer

Marco Antonio Roberts (born July 21, 1963, in Kinshasa, Democratic Republic of the Congo) is an American political activist, strategist, and writer recognized for his involvement in LGBTQ+ conservatism in Texas. His work has focused on individual rights and conservative values within political and social contexts.

== Biography ==
Roberts was born in Kinshasa and immigrated to the United States with his family during his childhood. He studied Political Science at Texas A&M University, where he became involved in political activism by leading the group Gay Student Services. In 1985, under his leadership, the group fought a lawsuit against Texas A&M University for refusing to recognize it as a student organization. The case, Gay Student Services v. Texas A&M University, reached the Supreme Court of the United States, which ruled in favor of the organization, citing violations of the First Amendment rights of association and free speech.

The ruling set a legal precedent protecting the rights of minority groups to organize and express themselves within public institutions in the United States. This case marked a turning point in Roberts’ involvement in political advocacy.

== Political career ==
=== Log Cabin Republicans (2014–2022) ===
In 2014, Roberts joined the Log Cabin Republicans of Houston and held various leadership roles:

- In 2015, he began publishing opinion pieces in outlets such as Montrose Star and the Houston Chronicle, focusing on topics like freedom of speech and conscience.
- In 2018, Roberts became the first openly gay member of the Platform Committee of the Texas Republican Party. His appointment shocked many conservative Christians. During his tenure, he negotiated the removal of anti-gay language that had been in the party platform for decades.
- In 2020, as state chairman for Log Cabin Texas, Roberts successfully managed to prevent efforts to reinstate anti-gay language in the platform. However, after his departure from Log Cabin in 2022, some of the anti-gay language was reintroduced.
- In 2021, the Log Cabin Republicans of Texas, under Roberts’ leadership, supported the "Save Women’s Sports Bills" (S.B. 2 and S.B. 32). This marked the first time the group in Texas took a public stance on policies that prioritized biological sex over gender identity in matters of athletic competition.

In 2022, Roberts stepped down as state chair of the Log Cabin Republicans of Texas, citing disagreements with the national organization’s leadership and concerns over governance.

=== Founding the Texas Conservative Liberty Forum ===
That same year, Roberts co-founded the Texas Conservative Liberty Forum, a group promoting freedom of conscience and conservative values. The organization gained representation at the Texas Republican Party state convention, providing a platform for libertarian perspectives within the party.

=== Strategic coalitions ===
Roberts also founded the Freedom First Republicans Coalition, an alliance aimed at facilitating changes to the Republican platform and fostering collaboration with young and libertarian groups.

== Media presence ==
Roberts has contributed as a columnist for publications like the Houston Chronicle and Texas Tribune, writing on issues such as religious freedom and civil rights.

In June 2018, Roberts co-authored an opinion piece for the Houston Chronicle with Susanna Dokupil, a former assistant solicitor general of Texas. The article addressed the United States Supreme Court's decision in the case of *Masterpiece Cakeshop v. Colorado Civil Rights Commission*, which ruled in favor of a baker who declined to create a custom cake for a same-sex wedding, citing his religious beliefs. Roberts and Dokupil argued that the decision highlighted the importance of balancing freedom of conscience and mutual tolerance in legal disputes, emphasizing that the rights of all parties, including LGBTQ+ individuals and those with religious convictions, should be respected within the framework of the law. The article also noted that the case reflected broader tensions between civil rights and individual liberties.

He frequently participates as a panelist on the radio program Houston Matters, where he discusses current political issues.

== See also ==
- Log Cabin Republicans
- Texas Republican Party
