= Simply Equal =

Simply Equal is a grassroots coalition that formed to petition the city of Lawrence, Kansas, to add the words "sexual orientation" to its Human Relations Ordinance. In May 1995, Lawrence passed the "Simply Equal Amendment," thus becoming the first city in Kansas to prohibit discrimination in housing, employment, and public accommodations on the basis of sexual orientation.

Simply Equal was formed in 1991 and was led by the newly organized Freedom Coalition. Active supporters were the Lawrence National Organization for Women chapter, the American Civil Liberties Union, the League of Women Voters, the Kansas University Ecumenical Christian Ministries, and the Kansas University LesBiGay Services group. Lynne Green and Ben Zimmerman were co-chairs of Simply Equal.

Sidenote: Lawrence, Kansas actually became the second municipality in the state to adopt such legislation. Wichita, Kansas was the first in the 1970s. The Wichita anti-discrimination legislation was repealed in a referendum vote shortly after its installation.

== History ==
=== Background ===
Tension surrounding gay and lesbian issues had been mounting for years in Lawrence, in Kansas, and in the United States:

In 1983 Kansas became the first state to amend its incest law specifically to make same-sex incest a crime. In 1986 the Lawrence City Commission refused to acknowledge Gay and Lesbian Awareness Week. After complaints from the LGBT community, the Lawrence Department of Human Relations conducted a study which confirms local incidents of discrimination against gays and lesbians. They recommend that the words "sexual orientation" be added to the city's existing anti-discrimination ordinance. For two years, the issue was left untouched. In 1988, pressured by the local group Citizens for Human Rights in Lawrence, the city commission decided to vote on adding sexual orientation to the city's existing anti-discrimination ordinance. Opposition existed from the Alliance of Citizens for Traditional Values, who stated that the city's study does not prove discrimination. They argued that including "sexual orientation" would force local businesses to establish affirmative action for gays. Influenced by the religious right, the commission votes 3–2 against the proposed amendment. In 1989 the Christian Coalition of America was founded by Pat Robertson.

=== Polarizing issue in the 1995 City Commission elections ===
On November 16, 1994, after more than two years work, Simply Equal delivered copies of its report to City Hall with a cover letter requesting a study session and passage of the amendment. On January 18, 1995, over 100 people attended the study session at City Hall. Simply Equal co-chairs Lynne Green and Ben Zimmerman, together with Dennis Saleebey (chair of the KU task force on lesbian, bisexual, and gay concerns), spoke in favor of the amendment. Rev. Leo Barbee opposed it. At the end of the study session, City Commissioner Doug Compton presented the commission with a list of 33 questions to which he would like answered before the amendment goes to a vote.

Of the thirteen candidates who ran in the primary election, eight supported amending the Human Relations Ordinance to include sexual orientation (or Simply Equal). On February 28, the primary election narrowed the field to six candidates to run for three Commission seats in general election. The Freedom Coalition supported Lena Johnson (who lost), John Nalbandian (an incumbent commissioner up for re-election who came in first), and Allen Levine (who finished sixth). Doug Compton, an incumbent commissioner up for re-election and still undecided on Simply Equal, came in fourth after Bonnie Augustine and Jo Barnes, and just ahead of Carl Burkhead, all of whom opposed Simply Equal. In summary, a Simply Equal supporter received the most votes, followed by four Simply Equal opponents, and a sixth person who supported Simply Equal.

Shortly after the Primary election, Doug Compton announced that he would oppose the amendment and planned to ask Commission to vote on the issue before general election. At that time, three City Commissioners opposed Simply Equal and two supported it. However, after talking with the City Manager and other commissioners, Compton decided not to call for a vote on the amendment before the April 4 general.

On the April 4 General election, Joh Nalbandian came in first. Allen Levine, who took sixth place in the Primary election, took third place, just 16 votes behind Bonnie Augustine, a Simply Equal opponent.

Simply Equal passed on May 2, 1995 with a 3–2 vote. "The ordinance change sends a very powerful message to people that Lawrence won't tolerate discrimination based on sexual orientation," Zimmerman said. "People who feel they have been discriminated against can now file complaints with the human relations office."

Ray Samuel, director of Lawrence's Human Relations department, agreed that many of the opponents who spoke to the commission Tuesday were misinformed. Businesses or landlords would not be required to ask people their sexual orientations on an application nor would businesses need to hire a certain number of homosexuals would be required, Samuel said. Religious organizations would not be required to hire homosexuals. "There are no special rights or privileges being granted to anyone," he said. "The amendment provides a vehicle to protect all the citizens of Lawrence from unlawful discrimination. We want to make sure no one is denied the opportunity to make a living because of their sexual orientation, that is what this is all about."

== Arguments for and against Simply Equal ==
Prior to the vote, residents were invited to speak at a public hearing in support of or against Simply Equal.

=== Proponents ===
Lynne Green, co-chair of Simply Equal, said that since 1986 four separate task forces organized to study the problem of discrimination have unanimously recommended the addition of sexual orientation to the city's human relations ordinance. She told the commission that Simply Equal had rallied the support of over 1,000 Lawrence residents, 300 businesses and 65 churches and synagogues.

Though all of the commissioners had previously taken stands on the issue, more than fifty people made their way to the front of the crowded meeting room to speak out for or against the amendment. Supporting the amendment were individuals from the community, as well as religious leaders and representatives of organizations such as the American Civil Liberties Union, Parents and Friends of Lesbians and Gays, and Amnesty International. many spoke out against the irrational rhetoric and misinformation they said were widely used by opponents of civil rights. They specifically attacked the claim that Gay, Lesbian and Bisexual people do not need legal protection against discrimination and that anti-discrimination ordinances that included sexual orientation are a granting of "special rights."

"Many people are excluded from the US Constitution," said Maurice Bryan, director of Affirmative Action at the University of Kansas. "Our history of civil rights battles strives to reinclude these people." Bryan said that there are only two side issues surrounding the proposed amendment: "Either we are comfortable with discrimination or we are not."

=== Opponents ===
Many of them told the commission that even though they were against the amendment, they were not homophobes and did not support discrimination/against Gay, Lesbian or Bisexual people. Several voiced concerns about increase cost for investigation and litigation they claimed the new ordinance would incur. Eric Schmidt, a Lawrence resident, said the ordinance reeked of "heavy-handed government," and that its passage would send the city "down a dark and slippery path."

Many opponents attempted to make religious or moral arguments against the ordinance saying that it would erode the city's moral fabric and that they didn't want their children to be exposed to values they didn't agree with. The Reverend William Dulin told the commission that "unless we have the moral courage to stand against the evils that underlie (the amendment), this city is going to be up against something that (it) will not like."
