= Tennessee Transgender Political Coalition =

U.S. civil rights organization

- U.S. State of Tennessee
- Founded: May 30, 2003
- Location: Nashville, Tennessee
- Region served: Tennessee
- Website: ttpcweb.com

The Tennessee Transgender Political Coalition is a transgender and LGBTQ civil rights organization in the state of Tennessee in the United States of America.

== Overview ==
The Tennessee Transgender Political Coalition (TTPC) was founded on May 30, 2003, in Nashville, Tennessee, by Marisa Richmond and a group of concerned citizens. It is a trans organized and trans led organization. It is inclusive of intersectional identities and identities both binary and nonbinary.

For over a decade, the TTPC has lobbied both for and against legislation affecting the transgender community of Tennessee. The organization has lobbied against a 2006 referendum to amend the state constitution to ban same-sex marriage, the Don't Say Gay bill sponsored in 2011 by Sen. Stacey Campfield and Rep. Bill Dunn, and other public issues. It endorsed Nashville mayor Karl Dean for re-election in 2011 and Megan Barry in 2017.

Active members engage in direct lobbying efforts, public education, and grassroots community organizing, as well as the community support expected from any trans organization. A member has run for office, and currently serves on a metro human rights commission.

TTPC has lobbied for and been instrumental in several high-profile moments for LGBT equality: the Federal Hate Crimes Law (October 2009) passed inclusively for LGBT individuals—four of the votes in favor of the law were from representatives in Tennessee; the CANDO [Contract Accountability Non-Discrimination Ordinance] ordinance in Nashville; and the changing of policy in places such as FedEx and Vanderbilt University to include non-discrimination of employees based on gender identity or expression.

The organization was an outspoken opponent of a 2016 proposed law that would have required students in public schools and universities to use the restroom that corresponded with their assigned sex. Along with the Human Rights Campaign, the ACLU, and the Tennessee Equality Project, the TTPC was "highly critical" of the legislation, according to The Tennessean. Ryan Wilson, a regional field organizer for the Human Rights Campaign, noted that the work of the TTPC was particularly influential because the group succeeded at "uniting state and national resources" to form "a powerful barrier against a number of bills which have died now that legislative session has ended.

In August 2015, TTPC announced a community meeting in Johnson City, Tennessee. Following the meeting, a member of TTPC in partnership with local stakeholders, simultaneously worked to build a local transgender support group, organize the first inclusive public Transgender Day of Remembrance and fight an anti-child transgender bathroom bill sponsored by a legislator elected from the local area. All of these efforts were successful. Roe withdrew his sponsorship of the bill that year, though another legislator in a different part of the state picked it up. TTPC also assisted organizing hundreds of protestors showing up to attend a set of county commission meetings intending to vote on anti-marriage statements. Johnson City has since developed an actively supportive local culture for transgender people.

TTPC successfully fought bathroom bills and other assorted anti-trans and anti-LGBT bills in Tennessee in 2016 and 2017, and actively plans to continue doing so into the future until it is no longer necessary.

The coalition has received funds from the Transgender Justice Funding Project.

== See also ==
- LGBT rights in Tennessee
- List of LGBT rights organizations in the United States
- List of transgender-rights organizations
- Same-sex marriage in Tennessee
