= Mississippi Safe Schools Coalition =

The Mississippi Safe Schools Coalition (MSSC) is an organization in Mississippi that promotes safe schools for Lesbian, Gay, Bisexual, Transgender, Queer, or young people who are mistakenly perceived to be queer. The group was founded in 2008 and has already hosted events such as: the Mississippi Safe Schools Coalition Queer & Allies Summit and the Second Chance Prom. The Second Chance Prom was made famous due to Constance McMillan not being able to wear a tuxedo or take her girlfriend to the prom.

== About ==
The Mississippi Safe Schools Coalition is a collaboration of people and organizations, who believe that no student should ever feel too afraid to go to school. Harassment, bullying, and unfair school policy can make schools into hostile places for lesbian, gay, bisexual, transgender and queer youth or young people who are mistakenly perceived to be queer. MSSC trains students and allies to make schools safer, while fighting for long-term policy change. MSSC's work is made possible through a grant from the Liberty Hill Foundation’s Queer Youth Fund, making MSSC the first Mississippi LGBT youth advocacy group to receive foundation funding.

The MSSC actively works in numerous ways to address bullying in Mississippi schools. During their 2010 Queer Youth and Allies Summit, MSSC screened the Southern Poverty Law Center film "Bullied: A Student, a School and a Case That Made History."

== Mission ==
The mission of the Mississippi Safe Schools Coalition is to ensure that all students have a safe learning environment by protecting students’ constitutional rights, ending homophobia, transphobia, sexism, and all forms of discrimination, and fostering acceptance of students regardless of their actual or perceived sexual orientation or gender identity through public education and advocacy.

== Leadership ==
MSSC believes that it is impossible to make schools safe without giving young people a voice; for this reason, the coalition is entirely youth led. Our governing body is the Queer Youth Advisory Board (or QYAB). QYAB is made up of diverse high school and college age youth activists from across the state.
