= Equal Rights Washington =

LGBT advocacy organization

Coordinates: 47°36′50.4″N 122°19′29.9″W

- Equal Rights Washington's primary 501(c)(4) logo

- US State of Washington
- Formation: 2004
- Type: 501(c)(3)
- Headquarters: Seattle, Washington
- Region served: Washington
- Key people: Monisha Harrell, board chair
- Website: equalrightswashington.org

Equal Rights Washington (ERW) is Washington’s largest statewide LGBTQ advocacy and community outreach organization. ERW's mission is to ensure and promote dignity, safety, and equality for all lesbian, gay, bisexual, and transgender Washingtonians.

Equal Rights Washington consists of three organizations: Equal Rights Washington, a 501(c)(4) organization which focuses on political advocacy, ERW Education + Engagement, a 501(c)(3) organization which focuses on public education with regard to LGBTQ issues in Washington, and ERW Political Action, a registered political action committee which exists to provide support to equality-minded candidates for elected office in Washington state. Each of these subsidiary organizations are headed by independent boards of directors, in accordance and compliance with state and federal law.

== History ==
Many of ERW's founders and leaders made their entrance into the world of politics during the Hands Off Washington campaign between 1993 and 1997.

ERW was founded in 2004 to assist in the passage of Washington State's LGBT anti-discrimination bill, which for 28 years had been introduced in the state legislature, but never passed. In 2006, ERW played a crucial role in securing the passage of this legislation, Washington House Bill 2661. ERW was also a central player in the fight to have the Washington State Supreme Court give marriage rights to same-sex couples. In 2006, the Court decided not to grant those rights.

In 2007, ERW supported the successful passage of Washington State's domestic partner law, which granted several of the rights of marriage to same-sex couples. In 2008 over 100 additional state-level benefits of marriage were added to the original domestic partnership law, and in 2009 the remaining rights afforded to opposite-sex married couples were granted to same-sex partners via the state's domestic partnership law. This was thanks largely to the work of Equal Rights Washington and its coalition partners across the state. Throughout the expansion of the domestic partnership rights, Equal Rights Washington was very clear that its intention was to continue to publicize, educate about and advocate for its belief that nothing short of full and actual marriage equality is sufficient for families in Washington headed by same-sex couples.

More than just a marriage equality organization, Equal Rights Washington actively lobbies on behalf of LGBT homeless people, LGBT youth, on issues specifically affecting Washington's broad transgender community, and on health concerns impacting the LGBT community in Washington.

== Operations ==
ERW has no full-time staff. Several specialized consultants, interns, and volunteers maintain part-time office hours each week in support of the agency's mission and goals. Equal Rights Washington operates out of an office in Seattle's Capitol Hill neighborhood.

The organization is a member of the Equality Federation.

== See also ==
- LGBT rights in Washington (state)
- Same-sex marriage in Washington (state)
- List of LGBT rights organizations
- Washington House Bill 2661
- Washington Families Standing Together
- Washington United for Marriage
