= Servicemembers United =

American LGBT lobbying organization

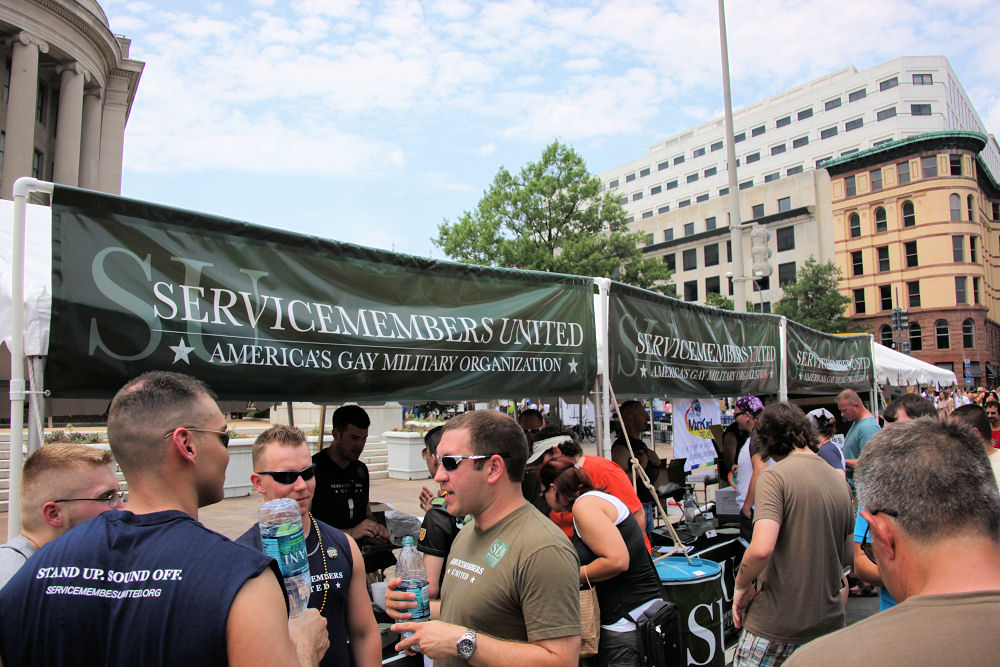
DC Capital Pride Street Festival, June 2011

Servicemembers United (SU) was an LGBT-interest organization dedicated to the repeal of the United States armed forces' gay-exclusionary policy, commonly known as "don't ask, don't tell" (DADT). The organization, formerly known as "Call to Duty", was formed in 2005 by several veterans.

The national leadership committee of Servicemembers United included Executive Director Alexander Nicholson, Co-Founder Jarrod Chlapowski, Stephen Peters and Sean Sala.

Alex Nicholson was one of the few lobbyists that participated in direct talks with the White House on how to pave the way for repeal. The effort is documented in Fighting to Serve, a tell-all of the behind-the-scenes fight.

Sean Sala independently organized the first Active Duty / Veteran Full Military contingent in a Pride parade in United States history - a defiance while DADT was still law. Upwards of 300 marched. That following year under the banner of SU, he pressured top military brass at the Pentagon to certify uniforms in Gay Prides nationwide in a rare memorandum from the office of the Secretary of Defense (under the leadership of Leon Panetta). The Uniformed March was another first in history where upwards of 400 marched.

The committee re-branded the "Campaign for Military Partners" into the American Military Partner Association, headed by Stephen Peters. It became the largest leading LGBT military force behind the lobbying efforts to repeal the Defense of Marriage Act, which allowed states to refuse to recognize same-sex marriages and defined marriage for federal purposes as being between one man and one woman.

Sean Sala formed the "Military Freedom Coalition" which became a lobbying tool to call for the pending repeal of the transgender military ban. Co-lobbyists Kristin Beck, a transgender retired Navy SEAL, and Shane Ortega, a transgender Army soldier, were two of many trans advocates against the ban.
