= Think Again =

Collaborative of artist activists

THINK AGAIN is an artist-activist collaborative founded in 1997 by David John Attyah (b. Los Angeles, CA) and S. A. Bachman (b. Columbus, OH). THINK AGAIN expects something political from art and uses images to challenge indifference. The collaborative views cultural work as essential to affecting social change and engaging people in the political process. Their work — mobile billboards, outdoor projections, guerilla interventions, digital murals, and viral poster campaigns — links the global to the local and combines cultural theory, sociological research, and activism to create a visual language for activating civic dialogue. The projects of THINK AGAIN explore a unique range of issues including queer liberation, economic inequality, the ways capitalist culture conspires to jeopardize the outnumbered, undocumented labor and the treatment of immigrants, racism, militarization, gentrification and displacement, and gender parity.

Many of THINK AGAIN's projects privilege face-to-face interactions. Attyah and Bachman hand out postcards at Pride parades, park mobile billboards in front of City Halls and grocery stores, and distribute posters to activists mobilizing against injustice. As part of its mission, the collaborative dispenses all of its printed matter free-of-charge through grassroots community organizations, art spaces, unions, academic institutions, and the internet. The early projects of THINK AGAIN are documented in the monograph, A Brief History of Outrage.

== Exhibitions and awards ==
THINK AGAIN exhibitions include:

- "Actions Speak," Worcester Museum of Art, Worcester, MA
- "Antagonisms," Museu d´Art Contemporani de Barcelona, Spain
- "The Anti-War Show: US Interventions From Korea to Iraq," Track 16 Gallery, Los Angeles, CA
- "Reactions," Exit Art, New York City, NY
- "The Culture of Class: Issues of Class in North American Culture," Maryland Institute College of Art
- "Not for Profit," Loyola Marymount University Art Museum
- "Democracy in America," Arizona State University Art Museum
- "A Brief History of Outrage," 16:1 Gallery, Los Angeles, CA
- "New Season," Museum of New Art, Detroit, MI.

They have received awards from the Massachusetts Cultural Council, LEF Foundation, Tanne Foundation and The Funding Exchange/Outfund.

=== Projects ===
- Actions Speak (2008-2010) is a multi-media project examining political brutality and public policy, and reconsiders social problems like HIV/AIDS and violence against women. The project features a 17 x 67 foot interior wall mural and a concurrent outdoor projection. Debuting the week before the 2008 Presidential Election, Actions Speak promotes dialogue between art and public response, between global reality and local action. Commissioned by the Worcester Art Museum.
- The NAFTA Effect (2006-2007) is a series of public projections in Los Angeles and Boston addressing how free trade reshapes the lives of people on both sides of the United States–Mexico border.
- Hola/Hello (2002 and 2006) includes postcards and installations that link the rape, sexualized violence, and murder of over three hundred unidentified women in Ciudad Juárez, Chihuahua, to the structural effects of the North American Free Trade Agreement (NAFTA) and intergovernmental relations between the US and Mexico.
- Protestgraphics (2001-2004) was one of the first websites to respond to the 9/11, U.S. military action in Iraq and Central Asia, violence against Arab and Muslim Americans, and to the Bush administration's war on terrorism. In addition to the online archive, 500 sets of posters were distributed free of charge to organizations and activists internationally. Major campaign: "Act Like It's A Globe, Not An Empire."
- CIA.TV (2001-2003) included a mobile billboard in Los Angeles, California and a web debate inviting the public to think critically about the increasingly blurry lines between news and entertainment at a political moment when federal agencies want permission to withhold information from the public, seek expanded surveillance authority and increase their budgets.
- Target Marketing Is Not A Social Movement (2001-2002) is a mobile billboard and postcard project that addressed target marketing and "Gay Chic."
- Popping The Question (2000) is a caravan of mobile billboards circulated throughout the cities of Boston, Massachusetts and San Francisco, California intended to inspire public debate about the topics of marriage and family.
