= Love Makes a Family =

American LGBTQ rights organization

Love Makes a Family is a non-profit advocacy and assistance organization of families headed by LGBTQ people working for equal marriage and family rights in the United States. It was also the name of a former organization in Connecticut that disbanded in 2009 after achieving its aims.

== Chapters ==
=== Oregon ===
Love Makes a Family, Inc. was founded in 1992 by Bonnie Tinker as an outgrowth of the making of a video of the same name on lesbian and gay Quaker families, and incorporated in 1993 in connection with opposition to Ballot Measure 9 on the part of "a racially diverse group of sexual minorities in Oregon and Southwest Washington." It is headquartered in Portland, Oregon. Its activities began in support of families, with support groups for parents and children and then a talk show with Tinker on a Christian right-wing radio station, KKEY, as well as a newsletter, a schools committee to speak with students and teachers, and increasing political activity. Based on Tinker's view that "meaningful social change doesn’t take place with 50 percent plus one, but rather when communities are transformed," the group also has booths at the Oregon State Fair for marriage equality and for non-violence, and continues Tinker's "Open Hearts and Minds" workshop since her death in an accident in July 2009.

=== Connecticut ===
Love Makes a Family of Connecticut or Love Makes a Family (Connecticut), Inc. was founded in 1999 as a coalition of organizations and individuals working for equal marriage rights for same-sex couples in Connecticut, using community education, grassroots organizing and legislative advocacy and lobbying. Founded by five statewide organizations to pass a co-parent adoption law, it succeeded in 2000 in that and also in defeating a "Defense of Marriage Act", and therefore instead of disbanding, incorporated and made the legalization of gay marriage its new goal. After that goal was achieved, in November 2009 it dissolved and donated its records to the Yale University Library.

== See also ==
- LGBTQ parenting
- Same-sex marriage in Connecticut
- Same-sex marriage in Oregon
