= 1997 in LGBTQ rights =

This is a list of notable events in the history of LGBT rights that took place in the year 1997.

== Events ==
- Sodomy is decriminalized in the People's Republic of China.
- Fiji becomes the second country in the world whose constitution explicitly protects against discrimination based on sexual orientation, although the Fijian government does not invalidate or repeal its sodomy laws.
- U.S. state of Maine bans sexual orientation discrimination in the private sector. The ban is later repealed in a referendum.
- U.S. state of New Hampshire bans sexual orientation discrimination in the private sector.

=== April ===
- 30 — Ellen DeGeneres's character Ellen Morgan comes out as gay in "The Puppy Episode", seen by 42 million viewers.

=== July ===
- 2 — District judge Eugene Nickerson in Abel v. United States of America, a challenge to "don't ask, don't tell", rules that the law in its entirety violates the First and Fifth Amendment to the United States Constitution.

=== October ===
- 3 — In Ontario, Canada court rules that the Government of Ontario's Insurance Act must include same-sex partners in its definition of spouse.

=== November ===
- 25 — Homosexuality is decriminalized in Ecuador following a landmark decision handed down by the Constitutional Tribunal.

=== December ===
- Annise Parker is elected as an at-large member of the Houston City Council alongside mayoral candidate Lee P. Brown.
- 2 — David Catania becomes the first openly gay or lesbian person to be elected to the city council of Washington, D.C.
- 10 — The Constitution Review Committee in Florida votes 6–2 to reject adding sexual orientation as a criterion for protection in the state constitution.
- 16 — In New Zealand, the court of appeal rules unanimously not to grant same-sex couples the right to marry.
- 17 — In the U.S. state of New Jersey, same-sex couples are given the right to jointly adopt children.

== See also ==
- Timeline of LGBT history — timeline of events from 12,000 BCE to present
- LGBT rights by country or territory — current legal status around the world
- LGBT social movements
