= Trans-e-motion =

"+shortd+"

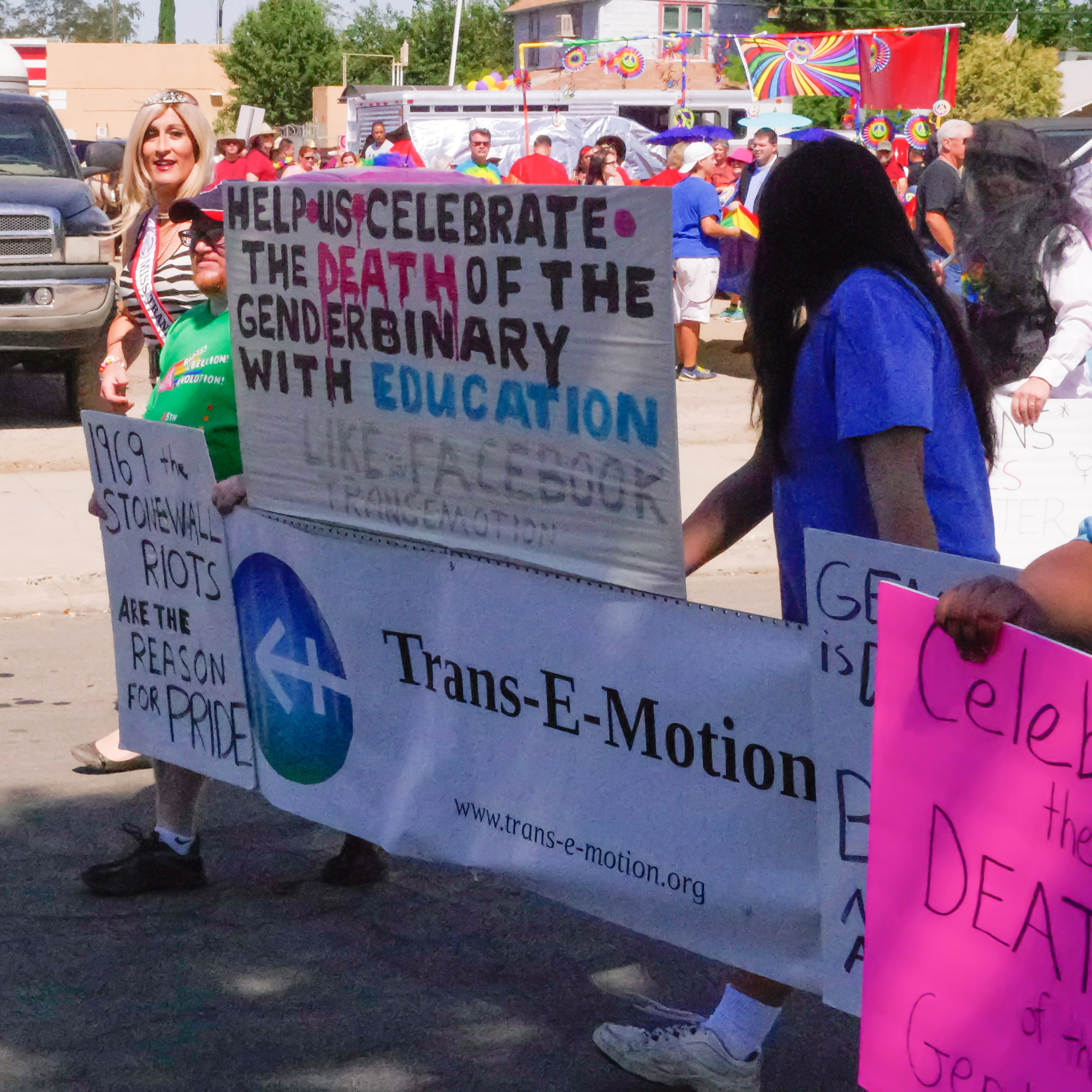
- Founded: 2010; 16 years ago
- Type: 501c3
- Purpose: Supporting and advocating for the transgender community in Fresno County
- Location: Fresno, California, US
- Region served: Fresno County, California
- Website: transemotion.com

Trans-e-motion is a nonprofit organization located in Fresno, California, United States. It was founded in 2005 and incorporated in 2010.

The organization serves the local transgender and gender nonconforming community in Fresno by providing social spaces, support groups, and advocating for trans issues. The organization participates in events such as Transgender Day of Remembrance and International Transgender Day of Visibility.
