= Transgender Education Advocates of Utah =

Utah transgender advocacy organization

Transgender Education Advocates (TEA) of Utah

- U.S. State of Utah
- Founded: 2003
- Founder: Christopher Scuderi, Rebecca Wilder, Teinamarrie Nelson Scuderi
- Type: Non-profit 501(c)(3)
- Location: Salt Lake City, Utah
- Region served: Utah
- Members: over 600
- Key people: Connie Anast-Inman, Candice Metzler, Alex P. Miller
- Revenue: less than $10,000
- Volunteers: 12

Transgender Education Advocates (TEA) of Utah is a 501(c)(3) registered non-profit located in Salt Lake City, Utah. It is involved in transgender and LGBT rights activism in the state of Utah.

== History ==
Originating in 2003, TEA of Utah was founded under the non-profit umbrella of the Utah Pride Center. From 2003 to 2006, TEA of Utah began transgender outreach and education, including sponsoring International Transgender Day of Remembrance (TDoR) in Utah. From 2006 to present, TEA of Utah, collaborating with local and national transgender and ally groups, has organized this event. In 2009, TEA of Utah formally separated from the Utah Pride Center and sought to receive their own non-profit status. It was granted in 2010.

TEA of Utah works to educate the public, advocate for the LGBT community, and eliminate prejudice and discrimination.

In 2011, Connie Anast-Inman was selected as executive director of the organization. She served in this capacity until her resignation June 15, 2015, at which time she presented the reigns to the board president, Dr. Candice Metzler, as the new executive director. Vice Chair Alex P. Miller became board chair until his death on October 22, 2015.

TEA of Utah consists of nine voting board members.

On January 23, 2020, TEA of Utah announced that, for the first time, their executive director position would be a paid position and not volunteer. Dr. Candice Metzler was selected to fill the position.

== TDoR 2013 ==
Official Declaration of TDOR from Mayor Ralph Becker

Supported by TEA and other LGBT groups in Utah, Salt Lake City mayor Ralph Becker declared November 20, 2013, "International Transgender Day in Utah", the first public acknowledgement of the annual event by a Utah governmental office.

The first TDoR was held in Taylorsville, Utah with keynote speaker Salt Lake City Police Chief Chris Burbank.
