= National Transgender Advocacy Coalition =

U.S. political advocacy organization

The National Transgender Advocacy Coalition (NTAC) was a federal level political lobbying and advocacy organization which was founded in 1999 and established as a 501(c)(4) lobbying group in Virginia of 2000. The NTAC was founded by a group of experienced transgender lobbyists dedicated to protecting the civil rights of transgender and gender variant people. NTAC reports and spokespersons are widely cited in the media on transgender issues.

NTAC hosted its first lobbying event in 2001, and organized lobbying events in 2001, 2004, 2005, 2007, and 2009. NTAC kept detailed description and statistics of what is said to its lobbyists for future reference by activists.

== Philosophy ==
The initial goal of the NTAC was working towards ensuring inclusion of transgender rights into the Employment Non-Discrimination Act (ENDA), as well as participating in pushing for more progressive policy development with respect to issues relating to gender variance and public gender presentation. The NTAC differed from other transgender advocacy organizations in that it has no paid employees, paid office space, nor has it taken money from any other organizations, remaining independent and transparent in its goals and work. The coalition remained vocal in Washington, D.C., working for the "advancement of understanding and attainment of civil rights for all transgendered and intersexed people in every aspect of society."

== Board ==
NTAC was started by trans activists Dawn Wilson, Anne Casebeer, Sarah Fox, Cathy Platine, Jessica Redman, Monica Roberts, JoAnn Roberts, and Vanessa Edwards-Foster.

The board of the NTAC has undergone many changes of personnel over the years, as board members have had a high turnover rate. This has been balanced by the activists who joined the board who grew in knowledge and stature during their board terms. However, from its beginning, each lobbying visit to Washington, D.C., that NTAC has planned and executed was very effective, netting useful information on the changing points of view of elected officials, building a database of useful information with Congress, and training more citizen-lobbyists.

Board chairs included:

- Monica Roberts - Lobby Chair (1999–2002)
- Dawn Wilson (2000)
- Yosenio Lewis (2001–2002)
- Vanessa Edwards-Foster (2002–2006)
- Ethan St. Pierre (2007–)

== Organized events ==
The NTAC organized their first lobbying event in 2001, with other events organized in 2004, 2007 and 2009. The first organized lobbying event demonstrated on Capitol Hill, where NTAC leaders hoped to familiarize Congress with the daily struggles of transgender and intersex individuals. They continued to monitor bills pending before congress, organizing lobbying events, and attending the traditional Lobby Day which is held in the spring of odd-numbered years to brief new members of congress on transgender issues during their era of activity. Throughout all events and meetings, the NTAC’s mission was to provide a voice for those who are discounted and overlooked: "We focus on a time when no transgendered individual will have to hide in shame."

NTAC was also one of the first organizations to encourage the annual Transgender Day of Remembrance after their active support of transgender teenage Gwen Araujo, who was murdered in October 2002 out of racism and transphobia.

In 2003, NTAC made a press release addressing the anti-trans book The Man Who Would Be Queen, insisting that the process of how the book was published by Joseph Henry Press, an imprint of National Academies Press, owned by the United States National Academy of Sciences, be reviewed.

== See also ==
- Transgender Law Center
