= Fine by Me (organization) =

American LGBTQ organization

Fine by Me was an organization in the United States, and now a project of Atticus Circle, with a mission to give voice to friends and supporters of lesbian, gay, bisexual, and transgender (LGBTQ) people. The organization developed a project to print T-shirts bearing the phrase "gay? fine by me" and then worked with communities to distribute and wear the T-shirts to show acceptance and support for LGBT people and publicly demonstrate against homophobia.

The organization began at Duke University in spring 2003 after The Princeton Review's college guide ranked Duke number 1 in the category of "Alternative Lifestyles not an alternative." Fine By Me started when, during a dinner conversation, ten friends, both gay and straight, came up with the idea to distribute free T-shirts with an anti-homophobic message The T-shirts were order and distributed by Lucas Schaefer, a junior, and Leila Nesson Wolfrom, a graduate student both at Duke University, and their friends. In less than two weeks, the group distributed nearly 2,000 T-shirts to students, faculty and staff. Even then university president, Nannerl 'Nan' Overholser Keohane, wore a T-shirt.

Within two years, Nesson Wolfrom had coordinated the distribution of more than 14,000 "gay? fine by me" shirts.

The idea continued to spread by word of mouth to schools all over the country including to traditionally conservative and religious institutions. When the student government backed by the board of trustees for the University of Notre Dame denied recognition of a gay straight alliance on campus, the students responded by pulling together the resources to purchase and hand out 3000 orange gay? fine by me t-shirts. Joe Dickmann, who was a board member of the unrecognized OutreachND said, "[The] administration...gave us no support and repeatedly tried to sabotage our efforts...so we worked through email and word of mouth [to] deliver.. 2300 T-shirts by years end." Of the decision Nesson Wolfrom would say that the students "couldn't change the rules, but they could completely overwhelm as a visible presence."

Since its founding in 2003, the organization has expanded its focus to include churches and synagogues, local civic groups, PFLAG chapters, businesses, and other community groups and organizations. For groups wanting to show support, custom T-shirts are printed with a custom organizations name in place of "us" in "gay? fine by us".

In September 2008, Fine By Me became a special project of Atticus Circle.

== See also ==
- LGBT rights in the United States
