= Sylvia Rivera Law Project =

Legal aid organization

The Sylvia Rivera Law Project (SRLP) is a legal aid organization based in New York City at the Miss Major-Jay Toole Building for Social Justice that serves low-income or people of color who are transgender, intersex and/or gender non-conforming. The organization was formed in August 2002 by attorney and transgender civil rights activist Dean Spade. The project was named for Sylvia Rivera, a transgender activist and veteran of the 1969 Stonewall Riots, who died the same year that SRLP was formed.

== Founding ==
In February 2002, Spade was followed into the bathroom by a police officer. In an essay about trans public bathroom use and bathroom bills, Spade describes his experience: "As I was looking to see what stalls were open, he approached and asked for my ID. I explained that I was in the right bathroom, that I am transgender and I understood the confusion, but I was just going to use the bathroom and leave." The officer questioned his gender and arrested him. The court assigned attorney asked personal, invasive questions during the first meeting, which made Spade fear what the trial would hold: "[Spade's attorney] came to the cell, read the police statement on my court documents, and asked why I was in the 'men's' room. I explained that I am transgender and I customarily use 'men's' rooms, and that I go by a male name and pronoun. He wrinkled up his face and said with a very dismissive and disapproving attitude, 'That is your business. I don't care.' He then asked me what my genitalia are." The charges against him were thrown out, but he was left with mixed feelings. He was upset by the transphobia that caused this to happen, but felt optimistic about what the media coverage may bring. Months later, he formed the Sylvia Rivera Law Project to help others who were in discriminatory situations like he was in.

== Goals ==
The project has released this mission statement:

The Sylvia Rivera Law Project works to guarantee that all people are free to self-determine their gender identity and expression, regardless of income or race, and without facing harassment, discrimination, or violence. SRLP is a collective organization founded on the understanding that gender self-determination is inextricably intertwined with racial, social and economic justice. Therefore, we seek to increase the political voice and visibility of low-income people of color who are transgender, intersex, or gender non-conforming. SRLP works to improve access to respectful and affirming social, health, and legal services for our communities. We believe that in order to create meaningful political participation and leadership, we must have access to basic means of survival and safety from violence.

The goals of the organization are to provide access to legal services for low-income transgender, intersex, and gender non-conforming people, provide public education and policy reform to end state-sanctioned discrimination on the basis of gender identity and expression. The organization also aims to build a collective organization that develops the leadership of low-income transgender, intersex, and gender non-conforming people of color while participating in the larger movement for racial, social, and economic justice. As Dean Spade himself puts it, "Sylvia Rivera Law Project (SRLP) is committed to providing people with some basic services. We see providing survival services as central to our goal of building racial and economic justice-centered trans resistance."

A large part of the group's work revolves around prison reform, as detention makes up the final step of the criminal justice system. SRLP has a variety of projects in the works, including advocating against solitary confinement, profiting off incarceration, and new jails being built in New York, as well as promoting safe healthcare for LGBT+ incarcerated folks.

== Areas of work ==
SRLP's organizers, lawyers and grassroots activists work on a variety of issues, including prison abolition, reform of gender-segregated facilities, and identity documents, as well as name changes, health care advocacy, ID replacement, criminal history, prisoner rights, access to gender affirming garments and hormones in prison, immigration relief such as asylum or U/T Visas, naturalization, and other legal and social services.

Much of the SRLP's work centers around legislative reform, especially surrounding prisons and what sends people there. Founder Dean Spade is particularly interested in the intersection of race and sexuality/gender expression, and crime related to these issues. As he puts it, hate crime laws "focus on punishment and have not bee shown to actually prevent bias-motivated violence... Hate criminology laws strengthen and legitimize the criminal punishment system, a system that targets the very people that these laws are supposedly passed to protect. The criminal punishment system has the same biases (racism, sexism, homophobia, transphobia, ableism, xenophobia) that advocates of these laws want to eliminate."

== Impact ==
In the court case Rodriguez v. Johnson et al., 20-year-old transgender woman Alyssa Rodriguez was incarcerated at the Red Hook Residential Center under the Office of Children and Family Services in Dutchess County, New York. Under their care, Rodriguez was denied her hormonal treatment, and disciplined for her feminine gender expression. SRLP, in association with Lambda Legal, won Rodriguez a substantial sum of cash in return for the emotional distress imposed on her.

== Values and vision ==
SRLP members acknowledge that the system is the problem with regards to discrimination towards gender. Oppressed individuals must fight for their equality by sticking together, working towards this common goal of justice. This can only be done by themselves as the system has proved to be an unreliable source in maintaining equal rights for all individuals, regardless of race or gender. With this in mind, members work with all oppressed communities in obtaining the shared goal of equality. Members believe that this work will further equality for our community as a whole versus for simply one oppressed group. SRLP maintains an equalized work environment that does not place members in a system of hierarchy.

Gabriel Arkles, Pooja Gehi, and Elana Redfield, three lawyers employed by the SRLP, came together and wrote an article entitled "The Role of Lawyers in Trans Liberation: Building a Transformative Movement for Social Change," in which they lay out ways that lawyers can impact the lives of trans folks, especially through legislation. A major theme of this article is that affording LGBTQ+ folks the same rights as heterosexual, cisgender folks is almost as harmful as our current system, since the problems lie within capitalism itself, not just the difference in rights under capitalism: "A legal strategy that merely extends existing rights and values to include gays, lesbians, bisexual people, and transgender people without looking at the racism, classism, ableism, homophobia, transphobia, xenophobia, and corruption that maintain capitalism will only protect the structures of empire that oppress poor people and people of color."

== See also ==
- LGBT rights in the United States
- List of LGBT rights organizations
- The New York Foundation
