= Atticus Circle =

American LGBTQ advocacy group

- Founded: 2004
- Dissolved: c. 2014
- Purpose: Civil rights
- Location: Austin, Texas, United States
- Method: Education, advocacy

Atticus Circle was a non-profit organization whose mission was to educate and mobilize straight people to advance equal rights for gay, lesbian, bisexual, and transgender partners, parents, and their children. With the national office located in Austin, Texas, Atticus Circle focused on straight allies of the LGBT social movements. The organization was founded and was run mostly by straight people and works to empower straight and other allies to give them a sense of ownership in this civil rights struggle.

== History ==
Atticus Circle, named for protagonist Atticus Finch from To Kill a Mockingbird, was founded in late 2004 by Anne Wynne after 11 states passed what she considered anti-gay "Discrimination Amendments". Wynne is straight and noticed the lack of organizations catering to straight allies. Since its inception, Atticus Circle has participated in campaigns in Texas around GLBT domestic partnership benefits and "Discrimination Amendments". They have advocated against "Don't Ask Don't Tell" policies and for fair family policies. Wynne notes that most gay rights activism is done by gay people, although she finds it a natural issue for straight progressives to support: she says "we haven't gotten on their radar yet."

In October 2007, the organization ran a national "Seven Straight Nights for Equal Rights" event, where the straight community could show support for LGBT rights. It was one of the first such events in Austin, Texas, and in the United States. The event was held again in 2008.

As of late 2022 the organization's official website was offline. An image captured in February 2021 showed that no updates had been made in the previous seven years.

== Projects ==
January–May, 2007: Atticus Circle formed the "Equality Circle", a group of straight volunteers in Austin, Texas, who paired with LGBT people to advocate for equal rights during the 2007 Texas Legislative Session.

October 7–13, 2007: Seven Straight Nights for Equal Rights, in partnership with Soulforce was held October 7–13, 2007 in many cities throughout the United States, including Montgomery, Alabama; Phoenix, Arizona; Los Angeles and Humboldt County, CA; Atlanta, Georgia; Indianapolis, Indiana; Shreveport, Louisiana; Augusta, Maine; New York City; Raleigh, North Carolina; Salem, Oregon; Harrisburg, Pennsylvania; Austin, Texas; Houston, Texas; and Seattle, Washington. Straight individuals, couples and families held overnight vigils all over the country stating their support for LGBT equal rights.

== See also ==
- LGBT rights in Texas
