= One Iowa =

LGBTQ organization in Iowa, United States

- U.S. State of Iowa
- Formation: November 2006
- Purpose: LGBT rights
- Location: Des Moines, Iowa (USA)
- Region served: Iowa
- Key people: Courtney Reyes, executive director
- Website: oneiowa.org

One Iowa is a statewide LGBTQ equality organization. The organization works to preserve and advance equality for LGBTQ individuals in Iowa through advocacy, grassroots efforts, and education.

== Background ==
The organization was founded in November 2006 following the 2005 suit filed by Lambda Legal that led to the Varnum v. Brien suit. At first, the emphasis of the group was marriage equality, but soon after formation, a board of directors was established and efforts were increased to include civil rights, civil marriage, LGBTQ families and aging.

The organization is a member of the Equality Federation.

== Efforts ==
The organization has used the Internet and other grassroots methods to spread its message. It established a Facebook page, a Twitter page, and has a website at www.oneiowa.org. During Varnum, the group contacted residents and urged them to contact their local officials. They also held forums in towns throughout Iowa that included LGBT community members, individuals from the religious establishment and legal scholars, where they emphasized the need for marriage equality.

Following Varnum, the group was lauded for its grassroots efforts by the Gay & Lesbian Alliance Against Defamation. However, the group's efforts also faced criticism. Congressman Steve King (R-IA) remarked that the state would become "a gay-marriage mecca" following the court's decision. But a One Iowa spokesman maintained that the group's efforts concerned "Iowa couples" and that it was not his intention to turn the state into a "sideshow."

The organization has since worked to educate court recorders on how to "make sure gays and lesbian couples feel welcomed" when applying for a marriage license, and have allowed for participants to choose from "bride," "groom" or "spouse" on the document.

In coalition with its ally groups, One Iowa's achievements following Varnum also include defeating anti-marriage policies, modernizing Iowa's HIV transmission law, urging Iowa Senators to stop blocking judicial nominees at the federal level, civil rights advocacy to protect the LGBT community against employment and housing discrimination.

One Iowa's work also includes educating Iowans about why marriage matters to gay and lesbian couples, reaching out to communities of faith, addressing concerns about Iowa's aging and elder LGBT populations, and improving access to resources for transgender Iowans.

== See also ==
- LGBT rights in Iowa
- Same-sex marriage in Iowa
- List of LGBT rights organizations
