= Same-sex marriage law in the United States by state =

List of U.S. state and territorial statutes and codes, along with the Code of the District of Columbia, recognizing or prohibiting same-sex marriage, civil unions and domestic partnerships Statute recognizes same-sex marriage and civil unions and/or domestic partnerships Statute recognizes same-sex marriage only Statute neither recognizes nor prohibits same-sex marriage civil unions and domestic partnerships Statute prohibits same-sex marriage (not enforceable) Statute prohibits same-sex marriage, civil unions and domestic partnerships (not enforceable)

State and territorial constitutional laws on same-sex unions Constitution explicitly protects same-sex marriage Constitution implicitly protects same-sex marriage through state court ruling or general sexual orientation nondiscrimination clause No part of the Constitution bans or protects legal recognition of same-sex unions Constitution bans same-sex marriage Constitution bans same-sex marriage and civil unions Constitution bans same-sex marriage, civil unions, and any marriage-like contract between unmarried persons

This article summarizes the same-sex marriage laws of states in the United States. Via the case Obergefell v. Hodges on June 26, 2015, the Supreme Court of the United States legalized same-sex marriage in a decision that applies nationwide, with the exception of American Samoa and sovereign tribal nations.

There are 26 states which have constitutions including bans on same-sex marriage or other types of unions, and 30 states have statutes that ban same-sex marriage or other types of unions although these are all defunct under the Obergefell ruling. In November 2020, Nevada became the first state to repeal its constitutional ban on same-sex marriage following Obergefell.

As of 2015, same-sex marriage is now legal in all fifty states due to a ruling from the Supreme Court. However, in the aftermath of the Dobbs v. Jackson Women's Health Organization ruling, statutory or constitutional bans on same-sex marriages have received renewed attention over its applicability should Obergefell be overturned.

In December 2022, President Biden signed the Respect for Marriage Act. In the case that Obergefell is overturned and individual states outlaw same-sex marriages, the legislation regulates that all states and US territories must recognize legal unions performed in states where they are allowed. The Respect for Marriage Act was passed with bipartisan support in both chambers of Congress.

== Alabama ==
Ban declared unconstitutional?	Legalized by state?
Yes	No

Texts:
ALABAMA CONSTITUTION - Amendment 774. Sanctity of Marriage Amendment (=Ref.1, cited as the approves of Marriage Amendment)
& ALABAMA CODE - Title 30. Marital and domestic relations - Chapter 1. Marriage.
§ 30-1-19. Marriage, recognition thereof, between persons of the same sex prohibited.(=Ref.2, cited as the "Alabama Marriage Protection Act")

- Ref.1 (b) & Ref.2 (b)

Marriage is inherently a unique relationship between a man and a woman. As a matter of public policy, this state has a special interest in encouraging, supporting, and protecting the unique relationship in order to promote, among other goals, the stability and welfare of society and its children. A marriage contracted between individuals of the same sex is invalid in this state.

- Ref.1 (c) & Ref.2 (c)

Marriage is a sacred covenant, solemnized between a man and a woman, which, when the legal capacity and consent of both parties is present, establishes their relationship as husband and wife, and which is recognized by the state as a civil contract.

- Ref.1 (d) & Ref.2 (d)

No marriage license shall be issued in the State of Alabama to parties of the same sex.

- Ref.1 (e) & Ref.2 (e)

The State of Alabama shall not recognize as valid any marriage of parties of the same sex that occurred or was alleged to have occurred as a result of the law of any jurisdiction regardless of whether a marriage license was issued.

- Ref.1 (f)

The State of Alabama shall not recognize as valid any common law marriage of parties of the same sex.

- Ref.1 (g)

A union replicating marriage of or between persons of the same sex in the State of Alabama or in any other jurisdiction shall be considered and treated in all respects as having no legal force or effect in this state and shall not be recognized by this state as a marriage or other union replicating marriage.

== Alaska ==
Ban declared unconstitutional?	Legalized by state?
Yes	No

Texts:

- ALASKA CONSTITUTION - Article I. Declaration of Rights - §25. Marriage :

To be valid or recognized in this State, a marriage may exist only between one man and one woman.

- ALASKA STATUTES - Section 25. Marital and domestic relations - Chapter 25.05. Alaska marriage code

Section 25.05.013. Same-sex marriage:
(a) A marriage entered into by persons of the same sex, either under common law or under statute, that is recognized by another state or foreign jurisdiction is void in this state, and contractual rights granted by virtue of the marriage, including its termination, are unenforceable in this state.
(b) A same-sex relationship may not be recognized by the state as being entitled to the benefits of marriage.

== Arizona ==
Ban declared unconstitutional?	Legalized by state?
Yes	No

Texts:

- ARIZONA CONSTITUTION - ARTICLE XXX. MARRIAGE:

1. Marriage
Section 1. Only a union of one man and one woman shall be valid or recognized as a marriage in this state.

- ARIZONA REVISED STATUTES - Title 25 - Marital and Domestic Relations

§ 25-101 Void and prohibited marriages
... C. A marriage between persons of the same sex is void and prohibited.

- ARIZONA REVISED STATUTES - Title 25 - Marital and Domestic Relations

§ 25-112 Marriages contracted in another state; validity and effect
... A. Marriages valid by the laws of the place where contracted are valid in this state, except marriages that are void and prohibited by section 25-101.

== Arkansas ==
Ban declared unconstitutional?	Legalized by state?
Yes	No

Texts:

- Arkansas Constitution Amendment 83:

Section 1. Marriage. Marriage consists only of the union of one man and one woman.
Section 2. Marital status. Legal status for unmarried persons which is identical or substantially similar to marital status shall not be valid or recognized in Arkansas, except that the legislature may recognize a common law marriage from another state between a man and a woman.

- Arkansas Code Annotated - Title 9. Family law - subtitle 2. Domestic relations - chapter 11. Marriage (law passed 1997)
  - Subchapter 1. General Provisions.

Section 9-11-109. Same sex marriage void
Marriage shall be only between a man and a woman. A marriage between persons of the same sex is void.
Section 9-11-107. Validity of foreign marriages
(a) All marriages contracted outside this state which would be valid by the laws of the state or country in which the marriages were consummated and in which the parties then actually resided shall be valid in all the courts in this state.
(b) This section shall not apply to a marriage between persons of the same sex.

  - Subchapter 2. License and Ceremony.

Section 9-11-208. License not issued to persons under age or to persons of the same sex.
(b) It shall be the declared public policy of the State of Arkansas to recognize the marital union only of man and woman. No license shall be issued to persons to marry another person of the same sex and no same-sex marriage shall be recognized as entitled to the benefits of marriage.
(c) Marriages between persons of the same sex are prohibited in this state. Any marriage entered into by persons of the same sex, where a marriage license is issued by another state or by a foreign jurisdiction, shall be void in Arkansas and any contractual or other rights granted by virtue of that license, including its termination, shall be unenforceable in the Arkansas courts.

== California ==
Ban declared unconstitutional?	Legalized by state?
Yes	Yes

Texts:

- California Constitution - Article I. Declaration of rights.

Section 7.5.

(a) The right to marry is a fundamental right.

(b) This section is in furtherance of both of the following:

(1) The inalienable rights to enjoy life and liberty and to pursue and obtain safety, happiness, and privacy guaranteed by Section 1.

(2) The rights to due process and equal protection guaranteed by Section 7.

- California Family Code - Division 3. Marriage - Part 1. Validity of Marriage

300. (a) Marriage is a personal relation arising out of a civil contract between two persons, to which the consent of the parties capable of making that contract is necessary. Consent alone does not constitute marriage. Consent must be followed by the issuance of a license and solemnization as authorized by this division, except as provided by Section 425 and Part 4 (commencing with Section 500).

== Colorado ==
Ban declared unconstitutional?	Legalized by state?
Yes	Yes

Texts:

- COLORADO CONSTITUTION, ~~Art. II, §31:~~

~~Only a union of one man and one woman shall be valid or recognized as a marriage in this state.~~ (Removed by voters in 2024)

- COLORADO REVISED STATUTES §14-2-104:

(1) Except as otherwise provided in subsection (3) of this section, a marriage is valid in this state if:
~~(a) It~~ it is licensed, solemnized, and registered as provided in this part 1.~~; and~~
~~(b) It is only between one man and one woman.~~
~~(2) Notwithstanding the provisions of section 14-2-112, any marriage contracted within or outside this state that does not satisfy paragraph (b) of subsection (1) of this section shall not be recognized as valid in this state.~~

On March 25, 2025, the Colorado legislature passed SB25-014 "Protecting the Freedom to Marry," which gave effect to the November 2024 referendum deleting the same-sex marriage ban from the state constitution, by deleting all previous statutes banning same-sex marriage and replacing the definition of marriage with the following:

14-15-103. Definitions. As used in ARTICLE 15, unless the context otherwise requires: (4) "Marriage" means the legally recognized union of TWO INDIVIDUALS AS PARTNERS IN A PERSONAL RELATIONSHIP.

== Connecticut ==
Ban declared unconstitutional?	Legalized by state?
—N/a	Yes

Texts:

- Connecticut Statutes Title 46b Family Law - Chapter 815e.

Sec. 46b-20. Definitions.
Marriage means the legal union of two persons.

== Delaware ==
Ban declared unconstitutional?	Legalized by state?
—N/a	Yes

Texts:

- Delaware Statutes Title 13, section 101 (a) & (d)

(a) A marriage is prohibited and void between a person and his or her ancestor, descendant, brother, sister, uncle, aunt, niece, nephew or first cousin.
(d) A marriage obtained or recognized outside the state between persons prohibited by subsection (a) of this section shall not constitute a legal or valid marriage within the state.

§ 101. Void and voidable marriages.

(a) A marriage is prohibited and void between a person and his or her ancestor, descendant, brother, sister, half-brother, half-sister, uncle, aunt, niece, nephew or first cousin.

(b) A marriage is prohibited, and is void from the time its nullity is declared by a court of competent jurisdiction at the instance of the innocent party, if either party thereto is:

(1)-(5) [Repealed.]

(6) Divorced, unless a certified copy of the divorce decree (last decree if such person has been divorced more than once) or a certificate of such divorce from the clerk of the court granting the divorce is inspected by the clerk of the peace to whom such person makes application for a marriage license, and unless such person may in other respects lawfully marry; and, if such decree or certificate cannot be obtained, the Resident Judge of the county where such license is desired or the person designated by the Resident Judge to grant such certificates as may be accepted under this paragraph may grant a certificate of the facts as stated by the applicant and the certificate may, for the purposes of this chapter, be accepted in lieu of a certified copy of a divorce decree;

(7) On probation or parole from any court or institution, unless such person first files with the clerk of the peace to whom such person makes application for a marriage license a written consent to such person's proposed marriage from the chief officer of such court or institution or from someone who is appointed by such officer to give such consent, and unless in other respects the applicant may lawfully marry.

(c) [Repealed.]

(d) A marriage obtained or recognized outside the State between persons prohibited by subsection (a) of this section shall not constitute a legal or valid marriage within the State.

(e) For all purposes of the laws of this State, 2 persons of the same gender who are parties to a legal union other than a marriage (whether designated as a civil union, a domestic partnership or another relationship) established in another jurisdiction shall be afforded and shall be subject to the same rights, benefits, protections, responsibilities, obligations and duties as are afforded and imposed upon married spouses (whether derived from statutes, administrative rules or regulations, court rules, governmental policies, common law, court decisions, or any other provisions or sources of law, including in equity) if:

(1) Such legal union was validly entered into in such other jurisdiction;

(2) Such legal union would not be prohibited as a marriage by reason of subsection (a) of this section; and

(3) Such legal union affords and imposes on such individuals under the laws of the jurisdiction establishing such union substantially the same rights, benefits, protections, responsibilities, obligations and duties as a marriage.

§ 129. Equal treatment of marital relationships.

(a) All laws of this State applicable to marriage or married spouses or the children of married spouses, whether derived from statutes, administrative rules or regulations, court rules, governmental policies, common law, court decisions, or any other provisions or sources of law, including in equity, shall apply equally to same-gender and different-gender married couples and their children.

(b) Parties to a marriage shall be included in any definition or use of terms such as "dependent," "family," "husband," "wife," "widow," "widower," "immediate family," "next of kin," "spouse," "stepparent," "tenants by the entirety" and other terms, whether or not gender specific, that denote a spousal or familial relationship, or a person in a spousal or familial relationship, as those terms are used throughout the Code, administrative rules or regulations, court rules, governmental policies, common law, court decisions, or any other provisions or sources of the laws of this State, including in equity, regardless of whether the parties to a marriage are the same gender or different genders.

(c) To the extent that provisions of the laws of this State, whether derived from statutes, administrative rules or regulations, court rules, governmental policies, common law, court decisions, or any other provisions or sources of law, including in equity, adopt, refer to, or rely upon in any manner, provisions of United States federal law that would have the effect of treating differently same-gender married spouses or their children as compared to different-gender married spouses or their children, same-gender married spouses and their children shall be treated in all respects by the laws of this State as if United States federal law recognizes a marriage between persons of the same gender in the same manner as the laws of this State.

(d) The rights of same-gender married spouses, with respect to a child of whom either spouse becomes the parent during their marriage, shall be the same as the rights (including presumptions of parentage, paternity and maternity in Chapter 8 of this title) of different-gender married spouses with respect to a child of whom either spouse becomes the parent during their marriage.

(e) Notwithstanding anything to the contrary contained in, and in addition to any other rights afforded under, Chapter 31 of Title 16, if a married person is the legal parent of a child at the birth of the child, including pursuant to subsection (d) of this section, such person shall be entitled to have his or her name entered on the original certificate of birth as a parent of the child.

(f) All persons who enter into same-gender marriages that are solemnized in this State or are created by conversion from a civil union under the laws of this State consent to the nonexclusive jurisdiction of the Family Court of this State for all proceedings for divorce and annulment of such marriage, even if 1 or both parties no longer reside in this State, as set forth in § 1504 of this title.

- House Bill 75 provides (in part) that on July 1, 2013, section 101(a) was amended striking "between persons of the same gender" from the list of prohibitions; inserting an additional section 101 (e) providing for recognition of out-of-state marriages and civil unions as marriages (except those under the remaining section 101 (a) prohibitions); and inserting section 218 providing for the conversion of civil unions to marriages.

== Florida ==
Ban declared unconstitutional?	Legalized by state?
Yes	No

Texts:

- Florida Constitution - Article I. Declaration of rights:

Section 27. Marriage defined. - Inasmuch as marriage is the legal union of only one man and one woman as husband and wife, no other legal union that is treated as marriage or the substantial equivalent thereof shall be valid or recognized.

- Florida Statutes Annotated - Title XLIII. Domestic relations - Chapter 741. Marriage; Domestic violence.

Section 741.04. Marriage license issued.
No county court judge or clerk of the circuit court in this state shall issue a license for the marriage of any person … unless one party is a male and the other party is a female.
Section 741.212. Marriages between persons of the same sex
(1) Marriages between persons of the same sex entered into in any jurisdiction, whether within or outside the State of Florida, the United States, or any other jurisdiction, either domestic or foreign, or any other place or location, or relationships between persons of the same sex which are treated as marriages in any jurisdiction, whether within or outside the State of Florida, the United States, or any other jurisdiction, either domestic or foreign, or any other place or location, are not recognized for any purpose in this state.
(2) The state, its agencies, and its political subdivisions may not give effect to any public act, record, or judicial proceeding of any state, territory, possession, or tribe of the United States or of any other jurisdiction, either domestic or foreign, or any other place or location respecting either a marriage or relationship not recognized under subsection (1) or a claim arising from such a marriage or relationship.
(3) For purposes of interpreting any state statute or rule, the term "marriage" means only a legal union between one man and one woman as husband and wife, and the term "spouse" applies only to a member of such a union.

== Georgia ==
Ban declared unconstitutional?	Legalized by state?
Yes	No

Texts:

- Constitution of Georgia. Article I Section IV:

Paragraph I. Recognition of marriage.
(a) This state shall recognize as marriage only the union of man and woman. Marriages between persons of the same sex are prohibited in this state.
(b) No union between persons of the same sex shall be recognized by this state as entitled to the benefits of marriage. This state shall not give effect to any public act, record, or judicial proceeding of any other state or jurisdiction respecting a relationship between persons of the same sex that is treated as a marriage under the laws of such other state or jurisdiction. The courts of this state shall have no jurisdiction to grant a divorce or separate maintenance with respect to any such relationship or otherwise to consider or rule on any of the parties' respective rights arising as a result of or in connection with such relationship.

- Georgia Code Annotated - Title 19. Domestic Relations - Chapter 3. Marriage generally - Article 1. General Provisions

Section 19-3-3.1 Same sex marriages prohibited
(a) It is declared to be the public policy of this state to recognize the union only of man and woman. Marriages between persons of the same sex are prohibited in this state.
(b) No marriage between persons of the same sex shall be recognized as entitled to the benefits of marriage. Any marriage entered into by persons of the same sex pursuant to a marriage license issued by another state or foreign jurisdiction or otherwise shall be void in this state. Any contractual rights granted by virtue of such license shall be unenforceable in the courts of this state and the courts of this state shall have no jurisdiction whatsoever under any circumstances to grant a divorce or separate maintenance with respect to such marriage or otherwise to consider or rule on any of the parties' respective rights arising as a result of or in connection with such marriage.

== Hawaii ==
Ban declared unconstitutional?	Legalized by state?
—N/a	Yes

Texts:

- Hawaii Constitution, Article 1, Bill of Rights, § 23 MARRIAGE ~~Section 23. The legislature shall have the power to reserve marriage to opposite-sex couples.~~ (Added by HB 117 (1997) and election November 3, 1998, removed by voters in 2024).
- Statutes, HAWAII MARRIAGE EQUALITY ACT OF 2013

§572-B Interpretation of terminology to be gender neutral. When necessary to implement the rights, benefits, protections, and responsibilities of spouses under the laws of this State, all gender-specific terminology, such as "husband", "wife", "widow", "widower", or similar terms, shall be construed in a gender-neutral manner. This interpretation shall apply to all sources of law, including statutes, administrative rules, court decisions, common law, or any other source of law.

§572 -C Reliance on federal law. Any law of this State that refers to, adopts, or relies upon federal law shall apply to all marriages recognized under the laws of this State as if federal law recognized such marriages in the same manner as the laws of this State so that all marriages receive equal treatment.

"§572 - 1 Requisites of valid marriage contract. In order to make valid the marriage contract, which shall be permitted between two individuals without regard to gender, it shall be necessary that:

(1) The respective parties do not stand in relation to each other of ancestor and descendant of any degree whatsoever, two siblings of the half as well as to the whole blood, uncle and niece, uncle and nephew, aunt and nephew, or aunt and niece, whether the relationship is the result of the issue of parents married or not married to each other or parents who are partners in a civil union or not partners in a civil union;

(2) Each of the parties at the time of contracting the marriage is at least sixteen years of age; provided that with the written approval of the family court of the circuit within which the minor resides, it shall be lawful for a person under the age of sixteen years, but in no event under the age of fifteen years, to marry, subject to section 572-2;

(3) Neither party has at the time any lawful wife, husband, or civil union partner living, except as provided in section 572-A;

(4) Consent of neither party to the marriage has been obtained by force, duress, or fraud;

(5) Neither of the parties is a person afflicted with any loathsome disease concealed from, and unknown to, the other party;

(6) The parties to be married in the State shall have duly obtained a license for that purpose from the agent appointed to grant marriage licenses;

(7) The marriage ceremony be performed in the State by a person or society with a valid license to solemnize marriages and the parties to be married and the person performing the marriage ceremony be all physically present at the same place and time for the marriage ceremony."

"§572 -3 Contracted without the State. Marriages between two individuals regardless of gender and legal where contracted shall be held legal in the courts of this State."

== Idaho ==
Ban declared unconstitutional?	Legalized by state?
Yes	No

Text:

- IDAHO CONSTITUTION - Article III. Legislative department - §28. Marriage

A marriage between a man and a woman is the only domestic legal union that shall be valid or recognized in this state

- IDAHO CODE - Title 32. Domestic relations - Chapter 2. Marriage; nature and validity of marriage contract

§ 32-209. Recognition of foreign or out-of-state marriages
All marriages contracted without this state, which would be valid by the laws of the state or country in which the same were contracted, are valid in this state, unless they violate the public policy of this state. Marriages that violate the public policy of this state include, but are not limited to, same-sex marriages, and marriages entered into under the laws of another state or country with the intent to evade the prohibitions of the marriage laws of this state.

== Illinois ==
Ban declared unconstitutional?	Legalized by state?
—N/a	Yes

Texts: Illinois Compiled Statutes

- 750 ILCS 5/201. Formalities.

A marriage between any two (2) adults licensed, solemnized and registered as provided in this Act is valid in this State.

== Indiana ==
Ban declared unconstitutional?	Legalized by state?
Yes	No

Texts:

- Indiana Code - Title 31. Family law and juvenile law - Article 11. Family law: Marriage - Chapter 1. Who may marry

Section 31-11-1-1. Same sex marriages prohibited
(a) Only a female may marry a male. Only a male may marry a female.
(b) A marriage between persons of the same gender is void in Indiana even if the marriage is lawful in the place where it is solemnized.

== Iowa ==
Ban declared unconstitutional?	Legalized by state?
Yes	No

Texts:

- IOWA CODE - TITLE XV. Judicial Branch and judicial procedures - SUBTITLE 1. Domestic relations

CHAPTER 595 Marriage– 595.2. Gender — age. 1. Only a marriage between a male and a female is valid.

CHAPTER 595 Marriage– 595.20. Foreign marriages — validity. A marriage which is solemnized in any other state, territory, country, or any foreign jurisdiction which is valid in that state, territory, country, or other foreign jurisdiction, is valid in this state if the parties meet the requirements for validity pursuant to section 595.2, subsection 1, and if the marriage would not otherwise be declared void.

== Kansas ==
Ban declared unconstitutional?	Legalized by state?
Yes	No

Texts:

- Kansas Constitution, Article 15, Section 16

(a) The marriage contract is to be considered in law as a civil contract. Marriage shall be constituted by one man and one woman only. All other marriages are declared to be contrary to the public policy of this state and are void.
(b) No relationship, other than a marriage, shall be recognized by the state as entitling the parties to the rights or incidents of marriage.

- Kansas Statute, Section 23-2501. Nature of marriage relation.

The marriage contract is to be considered in law as a civil contract between two parties who are of opposite sex. All other marriages are declared to be contrary to the public policy of this state and are void. The consent of the parties is essential. The marriage ceremony may be regarded either as a civil ceremony or as a religious sacrament, but the marriage relation shall only be entered into, maintained or abrogated as provided by law.

- Kansas Statute Section 23-2508. Validity of marriages contracted without state.

All marriages contracted without this state, which would be valid by the laws of the country in which the same were contracted, shall be valid in all courts and places in this state. It is the strong public policy of this state only to recognize as valid marriages from other states that are between a man and a woman.

== Kentucky ==
Ban declared unconstitutional?	Legalized by state?
Yes	No

Texts:

- Kentucky Constitution, Section 233A

Only a marriage between one man and one woman shall be valid or recognized as a marriage in Kentucky. A legal status identical or substantially similar to that of marriage for unmarried individuals shall not be valid or recognized.

- Kentucky Revised Statutes

Section 402.005 Definition of marriage.
As used and recognized in the law of the Commonwealth, "marriage" refers only to the civil status, condition, or relation of one (1) man and one (1) woman united in law for life, for the discharge to each other and the community of the duties legally incumbent upon those whose association is founded on the distinction of sex.
Section 402.020 Other prohibited marriages.
(1) Marriage is prohibited and void: (d) Between members of the same sex;
Section 402.040 Marriage in another state
(1) If any resident of this state marries in another state, the marriage shall be valid here if valid in the state where solemnized, unless the marriage is against Kentucky public policy.
(2) A marriage between members of the same sex is against Kentucky public policy and shall be subject to the prohibitions established in KRS 402.045.
Section 402.045 Same-sex marriage in another jurisdiction void and unenforceable.
(1) A marriage between members of the same sex which occurs in another jurisdiction shall be void in Kentucky.
(2) Any rights granted by virtue of the marriage, or its termination, shall be unenforceable in Kentucky courts.

== Louisiana ==
Ban declared unconstitutional?	Legalized by state?
Yes	No

Texts:

- Louisiana Constitution, Article XII, section 15. Defense of Marriage

Marriage in the state of Louisiana shall consist only of the union of one man and one woman. No official or court of the state of Louisiana shall construe this constitution or any state law to require that marriage or the legal incidents thereof be conferred upon any member of a union other than the union of one man and one woman. A legal status identical or substantially similar to that of marriage for unmarried individuals shall not be valid or recognized. No official or court of the state of Louisiana shall recognize any marriage contracted in any other jurisdiction which is not the union of one man and one woman.

- Louisiana Civil code

Article 89. Impediment of same sex
Persons of the same sex may not contract marriage with each other. A purported marriage between persons of the same sex contracted in another state shall be governed by the provisions of Title II of Book IV of the Civil Code.
Article 96. Civil effects of absolutely null marriage; putative marriage
§4. A purported marriage between parties of the same sex does not produce any civil effects.
Article 3520. Marriage (Title II of Book IV of the Civil Code)
A. A marriage that is valid in the state where contracted, or in the state where the parties were first domiciled as husband and wife, shall be treated as a valid marriage unless to do so would violate a strong public policy of the state whose law is applicable to the particular issue under Article 3519.
B. A purported marriage between persons of the same sex violates a strong public policy of the state of Louisiana and such a marriage contracted in another state shall not be recognized in this state for any purpose, including the assertion of any right or claim as a result of the purported marriage.

== Maine ==
Ban declared unconstitutional?	Legalized by state?
—N/a	Yes

Texts:

Be it enacted by the People of the State of Maine as follows: Sec. 1. 19-A MRSA §650, as enacted by PL 1997, c. 65, §2, is repealed.

Sec. 2. 19-A MRSA §650-A is enacted to read:

§ 650-A. Codification of marriage

Marriage is the legally recognized union of 2 people. Gender-specific terms relating to the marital relationship or familial relationships, including, but not limited to, "spouse," "family," "marriage," "immediate family," "dependent," "next of kin," "bride," "groom," "husband," "wife," "widow" and "widower," must be construed to be gender-neutral for all purposes throughout the law, whether in the context of statute, administrative or court rule, policy, common law or any other source of civil law.

Sec. 3. 19-A MRSA §650-B is enacted to read:

§ 650-B. Recognition of marriage licensed and certified in another jurisdiction

A marriage of a same-sex couple that is validly licensed and certified in another jurisdiction is recognized for all purposes under the laws of this State.

Sec. 4. 19-A MRSA §651, sub-§2, as amended by PL 1997, c. 537, §12 and affected by §62, is further amended to read:

2. Application. The parties wishing to record notice of their intentions of marriage shall submit an application for recording notice of their intentions of marriage. The application may be issued to any 2 persons otherwise qualified under this chapter regardless of the sex of each person. The application must include a signed certification that the information recorded on the application is correct and that the applicant is free to marry according to the laws of this State. The applicant's signature must be acknowledged before an official authorized to take oaths. Applications recording notice of intentions to marry must be open for public inspection in the office of the clerk. When the application is submitted, the applicant shall provide the clerk with the social security numbers of the parties. The application must include a statement that the social security numbers of the parties have been provided to the clerk. The clerk shall record the social security numbers provided by each applicant. The record of the social security numbers is confidential and is not open for public inspection. Sec. 5. 19-A MRSA §655, sub-§3 is enacted to read:

3. Affirmation of religious freedom. This Part does not authorize any court or other state or local governmental body, entity, agency or commission to compel, prevent or interfere in any way with any religious institution's religious doctrine, policy, teaching or solemnization of marriage within that particular religious faith's tradition as guaranteed by the Maine Constitution, Article 1, Section 3 or the First Amendment of the United States Constitution. A person authorized to join persons in marriage and who fails or refuses to join persons in marriage is not subject to any fine or other penalty for such failure or refusal.

== Maryland ==
Ban declared unconstitutional?	Legalized by state?
—N/a	Yes

- Maryland Marriage Statute..

Valid Marriages

(a) Construction. — This section may not be construed to invalidate any other provision of this title.

(b) In general. — Only a marriage between two individuals who are not otherwise prohibited from marrying is valid in this State.

[An. Code 1957, art. 62, § 1; 1984, ch. 296, § 2.]

Marriages within certain degrees of relationship void; penalties

(a) Any marriage performed in this State that is prohibited by this section is void.

(b) (1) An individual may not marry the individual's:

(i) grandparent;

(ii) parent;

(iii) child;

(iv) sibling; or

(v) grandchild.

(2) An individual who violates any provision of this subsection is guilty of a misdemeanor and on conviction is subject to a fine of $1,500.

(c) (1) An individual may not marry the individual's:

(i) grandparent's spouse;

(ii) spouse's grandparent;

(iii) parent's sibling;

(iv) stepparent;

(v) spouse's parent;

(vi) spouse's child;

(vii) child's spouse;

(viii) grandchild's spouse;

(ix) spouse's grandchild; or

(x) sibling's child.

(2) An individual who violates any provision of this subsection is guilty of a misdemeanor and on conviction is subject to a fine of $500.

== Massachusetts ==
Ban declared unconstitutional?	Legalized by state?
Yes	Yes

Massachusetts does not define marriage in its state statutes or constitution.

== Michigan ==
Ban declared unconstitutional?	Legalized by state?
Yes	No

Texts:

- Michigan Constitution, Article I, Section 25

To secure and preserve the benefits of marriage for our society and for future generations of children, the union of one man and one woman in marriage shall be the only agreement recognized as a marriage or similar union for any purpose.

- Michigan Compiled Laws Annotated

551.1 Marriage between individuals of same sex as invalid contract.
Marriage is inherently a unique relationship between a man and a woman. As a matter of public policy, this state has a special interest in encouraging, supporting, and protecting that unique relationship in order to promote, among other goals, the stability and welfare of society and its children. A marriage contracted between individuals of the same sex is invalid in this state.
551.271 Marriages solemnized in another state validated.
(1) Except as otherwise provided in this act, a marriage contracted between a man and a woman who are residents of this state and who were, at the time of the marriage, legally competent to contract marriage according to the laws of this state, which marriage is solemnized in another state within the United States by a clergyman, magistrate, or other person legally authorized to solemnize marriages within that state, is a valid and binding marriage under the laws of this state to the same effect and extent as if solemnized within this state and according to its laws.'
(2) This section does not apply to a marriage contracted between individuals of the same sex, which marriage is invalid in this state under section 1 of chapter 83 of the revised statutes of 1846, being section 551.1 of the Michigan Compiled Laws.
551.272 Marriage not between man and woman invalidated.
This state recognizes marriage as inherently a unique relationship between a man and a woman, as prescribed by section 1 of chapter 83 of the Revised Statutes of 1846, being section 551.1 of the Michigan Compiled Laws, and therefore a marriage that is not between a man and a woman is invalid in this state regardless of whether the marriage is contracted according to the laws of another jurisdiction.

== Minnesota ==
Ban declared unconstitutional?	Legalized by state?
—N/a	Yes

- HF 1054: Civil marriage between two persons provided for, and exemptions and protections based on religious association provided for.
- Minnesota Statutes 2012, section 517.01

A civil marriage, so far as its validity in law is concerned, is a civil contract between two persons, to which the consent of the parties, capable in law of contracting, is essential.

== Mississippi ==
Ban declared unconstitutional?	Legalized by state?
Yes	No

Texts:

- Mississippi Constitution, Article 14, Section 263A

Marriage may take place and may be valid under the laws of this State only between a man and a woman. A marriage in another State or foreign jurisdiction between persons of the same gender, regardless of when the marriage took place, may not be recognized in this State and is void and unenforceable under the laws of this State.

- Mississippi Code § 93-1-1. Certain marriages declared incestuous and void.

(2) Any marriage between persons of the same gender is prohibited and null and void from the beginning. Any marriage between persons of the same gender that is valid in another jurisdiction does not constitute a legal or valid marriage in Mississippi.

== Missouri ==
Ban declared unconstitutional?	Legalized by state?
Yes	No

Texts:

- Missouri Constitution, Article I Bill of Rights

Section 33.Marriage, validity and recognition.
That to be valid and recognized in this state, a marriage shall exist only between a man and a woman.

- Missouri Annotated Statutes - Chapter 451. Marriage, Marriage Contracts, and Rights of Married Women

section 451.022. Public policy, same sex marriages prohibited—license may not be issued.
1. It is the public policy of this state to recognize marriage only between a man and a woman.
2. Any purported marriage not between a man and a woman is invalid.
3. No recorder shall issue a marriage license, except to a man and a woman.
4. A marriage between persons of the same sex will not be recognized for any purpose in this state even when valid where contracted.

== Montana ==
Ban declared unconstitutional?	Legalized by state?
Yes	No

Texts:

- Montana Constitution - Article XIII. General Provisions

Section 7. Marriage Only a marriage between one man and one woman shall be valid or recognized as a marriage in this state.

- Montana Code Annotated - Title 40. Family law - Chapter 1. Marriage

Section 40-1-103. General Provisions --- Formalities.
Marriage is a personal relationship between a man and a woman arising out of a civil contract to which the consent of the parties is essential.
Section 40-1-401. Prohibited marriages– contracts.
(1) The following marriages are prohibited: ... (d) a marriage between persons of the same sex.

== Nebraska ==
Ban declared unconstitutional?	Legalized by state?
Yes	No

Texts:

- Nebraska Constitution

Article I, Section 29. Marriage; same-sex relationships not valid or recognized. Only marriage between a man and a woman shall be valid or recognized in Nebraska. The uniting of two persons of the same sex in a civil union, domestic partnership, or other similar same-sex relationship shall not be valid or recognized in Nebraska.

== Nevada ==
Ban declared unconstitutional?	Legalized by state?
Yes	Yes

Texts:

- Nevada Constitution- Article I. Declaration of Rights.

Section 21. Recognition of marriage.
1. The State of Nevada and its political subdivisions shall recognize marriages and issue marriage licenses to couples regardless of gender.

2. Religious organizations and members of the clergy have the right to refuse to solemnize a marriage, and no person has the right to make any claim against a religious organization or member of the clergy for such a refusal.

3. All legally valid marriages must be treated equally under the law.

- Nevada Revised Statutes

Section 122.020

1. Except as otherwise provided in this section, two persons, regardless of gender, at least 18 years of age, not nearer of kin than second cousins or cousins of the half blood, and not having a [husband or wife] spouse living, may be joined in marriage.

2. Two persons, regardless of gender, who are married to each other may be rejoined in marriage if the record of their marriage has been lost or destroyed or is otherwise unobtainable.

== New Hampshire ==
Ban declared unconstitutional?	Legalized by state?
—N/a	Yes

Text:

- New Hampshire Statutes

457:1-a Equal Access to Marriage. – Marriage is the legally recognized union of 2 people. Any person who otherwise meets the eligibility requirements of this chapter may marry any other eligible person regardless of gender. Each party to a marriage shall be designated "bride", "groom", or "spouse." Source. 2009, 59:1, eff. January 1, 2010.

457:2 Marriages Prohibited. – No person shall marry his or her father, mother, father's brother, father's sister, mother's brother, mother's sister, son, daughter, brother, sister, son's son, son's daughter, daughter's son, daughter's daughter, brother's son, brother's daughter, sister's son, sister's daughter, father's brother's son, father's brother's daughter, mother's brother's son, mother's brother's daughter, father's sister's son, father's sister's daughter, mother's sister's son, or mother's sister's daughter. No person shall be allowed to be married to more than one person at any given time. Source. RS 147:2. CS 156:2. GS 161:2. 1869, 9:2. GL 180:2. PS 174:2. PL 286:2. RL 338:2. RSA 457:2. 1965, 46:1. 1987, 218:2, eff. July 17, 1987. 2009, 59:1, eff. January 1, 2010.

457:1 Purpose and Intent. – The purpose of this chapter is to affirm the right of 2 individuals desiring to marry and who otherwise meet the eligibility requirements of this chapter to have their marriage solemnized in a religious or civil ceremony in accordance with the provisions of this chapter. Source. RS 147:1. CS 156:1. GS 161:1. 1869, 9:1. GL 180:1. PS 174:1. PL 286:1. RL 338:1. RSA 457:1. 1987, 218:1, eff. July 17, 1987. 2009, 59:1, eff. January 1, 2010.

457:3 Recognition of Out-of-State Marriages. – Every marriage legally contracted outside the state of New Hampshire, which would not be prohibited under RSA 457:2 if contracted in New Hampshire, shall be recognized as valid in this state for all purposes if or once the contracting parties are or become permanent residents of this state subsequent to such marriage, and the issue of any such marriage shall be legitimate. Marriages legally contracted outside the state of New Hampshire which would be prohibited under RSA 457:2 if contracted in New Hampshire shall not be legally recognized in this state. Any marriage of New Hampshire residents recognized as valid in the state prior to the effective date of this section shall continue to be recognized as valid on or after the effective date of this section. Source. RS 147:3. CS 156:3. GS 161:3. GL 180:3. PS 174:3. PL 286:3. RL 338:3. RSA 457:3. 1965, 252:1. 1973, 145:6. 2004, 100:1, eff. May 14, 2004. 2009, 59:1, eff. January 1, 2010.

457:4 Marriageable. – No person below the age of 16 years shall be capable of contracting a valid marriage, and all marriages contracted by such persons shall be null and void. Source. 1907, 80:1. PL 286:4. RL 338:4. 2009, 59:2, eff. Jan. 1, 2010. 2018, 272:1, eff. Jan. 1, 2019.

457:46 Obtaining Legal Status of Marriage. –

I. Notwithstanding the provisions of RSA 457-A, no new civil unions shall be established on or after January 1, 2010. Two consenting persons who are parties to a valid civil union entered into prior to January 1, 2010 pursuant to this chapter may apply and receive a marriage license and have such marriage solemnized pursuant to RSA 457, provided that the parties are otherwise eligible to marry under RSA 457 and the parties to the marriage are the same as the parties to the civil union. Such parties may also apply by January 1, 2011 to the clerk of the town or city in which their civil union is recorded to have their civil union legally designated and recorded as a marriage, without any additional requirements of payment of marriage licensing fees or solemnization contained in RSA 457, provided that such parties' civil union was not previously dissolved or annulled. Upon application, the parties shall be issued a marriage certificate, and such marriage certificate shall be recorded with the division of vital records administration. Any civil union shall be dissolved by operation of law by any marriage of the same parties to each other, as of the date of the marriage stated in the certificate.
II. Two persons who are parties to a civil union established pursuant to RSA 457-A that has not been dissolved or annulled by the parties or merged into a marriage in accordance with paragraph I by January 1, 2011 shall be deemed to be married under this chapter on January 1, 2011 and such civil union shall be merged into such marriage by operation of law on January 1, 2011.

Source. 2009, 59:5, eff. January 1, 2010; 61:3, eff. January 1, 2010 at 12:02 a.m.

== New Jersey ==
State law was brought into compliance with court decisions on 10 January 2022.

Ban declared unconstitutional?	Legalized by state?
Yes	Yes

== New Mexico ==
Ban declared unconstitutional?	Legalized by state?
—N/a	Yes

New Mexico does not define marriage in its state statutes or constitution.

== New York ==
Ban declared unconstitutional?	Legalized by state?
—N/a	Yes

- New York Constitution - Article I - Bill of Rights (2024 Proposal 1)

§ 11 Equal protection of laws; discrimination in civil rights prohibited.
a. No person shall be denied the equal protection of the laws of this state or any subdivision thereof. No person shall, because of race, color, ethnicity, national origin, age, disability, creed, religion, or sex, including sexual orientation, gender identity, gender expression, pregnancy, pregnancy outcomes, and reproductive healthcare and autonomy, be subjected to any discrimination in their civil rights by any other person or by any firm, corporation, or institution, or by the state or any agency or subdivision of the state, pursuant to law.
b. Nothing in this section shall invalidate or prevent the adoption of any law, regulation, program, or practice that is designed to prevent or dismantle discrimination on the basis of a characteristic listed in this section, nor shall any characteristic listed in this section be interpreted to interfere with, limit, or deny the civil rights of any person based upon any other characteristic identified in this section.
(Emphasis added)

- New York Domestic Relations Law - Article 3 - Parties to a Marriage

§ 10-A Parties to a Marriage.
1. A marriage that is otherwise valid shall be valid regardless of whether the parties to the marriage are of the same or different sex.
2. No government treatment or legal status, effect, right, benefit, privilege, protection or responsibility relating to marriage, whether deriving from statute, administrative or court rule, public policy, common law or any other source of law, shall differ based on the parties to the marriage being or having been of the same sex rather than a different sex. When necessary to implement the rights and responsibilities of spouses under the law, all gender-specific language or terms shall be construed in a gender-neutral manner in all such sources of law.

== North Carolina ==
Ban declared unconstitutional?	Legalized by state?
Yes	No

Texts:

- North Carolina Constitution - ARTICLE XIV MISCELLANEOUS

Sec. 6. Marriage. - "Marriage between one man and one woman is the only domestic legal union that shall be valid or recognized in this State. This section does not prohibit a private party from entering into contracts with another private party; nor does this section prohibit courts from adjudicating the rights of private parties pursuant to such contracts."

- North Carolina General Statutes - Chapter 12. - Statutory Construction

Section 12-3. Rules for construction of statutes.
In the construction of all statutes the following rules shall be observed, unless such construction would be inconsistent with the manifest intent of the General Assembly, or repugnant to the context of the same statute, that is to say: (16) "Husband and Wife" and similar terms. - The words "husband and wife," "wife and husband," "man and wife," "woman and husband," "husband or wife," "wife or husband," "man or wife," "woman or husband," or other terms suggesting two individuals who are then lawfully married to each other shall be construed to include any two individuals who are then lawfully married to each other. (17) "Widow" and "Widower." - The words "widow" and "widower" mean the surviving spouse of a deceased individual.

- North Carolina General Statutes - Chapter 41. Estates - Statutory Construction - Article 5. Tenancy by the Entirety.

Section 41-55. Definitions.
For the purposes of this Article, the following definitions apply: (3) Spouses. - Two individuals then legally married to each other.

Section 41-56. Creation of tenancy by the entirety.
(a) Unless a contrary intention is expressed in the conveyance, a conveyance of real property, or any interest in real property, to spouses vests title in them as tenants by the entirety when the conveyance is to one of the following: (6) Two named individuals, married to each other at the time of conveyance, whether or not identified in the conveyance as being (i) husband and wife, (ii) spouses, or (iii) married to each other. (b) A conveyance by a grantor of real property, or any interest in real property, to the grantor and his or her spouse vests the property in them as tenants by the entirety, unless a contrary intention is expressed in the conveyance. The joinder of a spouse in a conveyance made by the grantor under this subsection is not necessary, but the conveyance is subject to the provisions of G.S. 52-10 or G.S. 52-10.1, except acknowledgement of the spouse of the grantor is not necessary. (c) When an individual owns an undivided interest in real property as a tenant in common with some individual or individuals other than his or her spouse and there occurs an actual partition of the property, a tenancy by the entirety may be created in the individual who owned the undivided interest and his or her spouse as follows: a. The intent of the tenant in common to create a tenancy by the entirety with his or her spouse in this exchange of deeds is clearly stated in the granting clause of the deed or deeds to the tenant in common and his or her spouse. b. The deed or deeds to the tenant in common and his or her spouse is signed by the tenant in common and is acknowledged before a certifying officer in accordance with G.S. 52-10. (2) In a judicial proceeding for actual partition where both spouses have the right to become parties to the proceeding and to have their pleadings state that the intent of the tenant in common is to create a tenancy by the entirety with his or her spouse. The order of partition must provide that the real property apportioned to the tenant in common and his or her spouse shall be owned by them as tenants by the entirety. (d) When spouses become co-owners of a mobile home, in the absence of a contrary intention appearing in the instrument of title, the spouses become tenants by the entirety with all the incidents of an estate by the entirety in real property, including the right of survivorship in the case of death of either spouse. For the purposes of this subsection, it is immaterial whether the property at any particular time is classified for any purpose as either real or personal. Nothing in this subsection is deemed to limit or prohibit any other type of ownership otherwise authorized by law. For the purposes of this subsection, the term "mobile home" means a portable manufactured housing unit designed for transportation on its own chassis and placement on a temporary or semipermanent foundation having a measurement of over 32 feet in length and over eight feet in width. As used in this subsection, the term "mobile home" also means a double-wide mobile home consisting of two or more portable manufactured housing units that are designed for transportation on their own chassis and are connected on site for placement on a temporary or semipermanent foundation having a measurement of over 32 feet in length and over eight feet in width.

Section 41-58. Possession and control of entireties property.
(a) Spouses shall have an equal right to the control, use, possession, and income from property held by them as tenants by the entirety. (b) Neither spouse may bargain, sell, lease, mortgage, transfer, convey, sign, pay out, or in any manner encumber any property held by them as tenants by the entirety without the written joinder of the other spouse. This section shall not be construed to require the spouse's joinder where a different provision is made under G.S. 41-56(b), G.S. 41-63(4), G.S. 39-13, G.S. 39-13.3, G.S. 39-13.4, or G.S. 52-10. (c) The mortgage or sale of an interest in real property held by spouses as tenants by the entirety where one or both spouses is incompetent is governed by the provisions of Article 15 of Chapter 35A of the General Statutes.

Section 41-59. Income derived from entireties property.
(a) Income derived from property held by spouses as tenants by the entirety becomes personal property held by the spouses as tenants in common in equal shares. (b) For income tax purposes, each spouse is considered to have received one-half the income or loss from property held by the spouses as tenants by the entirety.

Section 41-60. Liability of entireties property for debts of spouses.
(a) With respect to property held by spouses as tenants by the entirety prior to its termination, all of the following shall apply: (1) The property may not be held liable for individual debts of either spouse and a judgment lien against one spouse alone does not attach to the property. The property may be conveyed by joint deed of both spouses to anyone of their choice free and clear of a judgment lien against either spouse. (2) The property is liable for obligations of both spouses and a judgment lien against both spouses upon a joint obligation attaches to the property which may be sold under execution to satisfy the judgment. (b) Upon termination of the tenancy by the entirety and the conversion of the real property held by the entirety to another form of estate, a judgment lien against one spouse during tenancy by the entirety, if still active and unsatisfied, shall attach at that time to that spouse's interest in the new estate. Conversions of tenancy by the entirety property to another form of an estate occur, without limitation, under either of the following circumstances: (1) Upon divorce of the spouses, in which event the property is converted to a tenancy in common as provided in G.S. 41-63(5) and the judgment lien against the spouse will attach at that time to the undivided interest of the spouse.

Section 41-62. Insurance coverage and character of proceeds.
Where property held as tenants by the entirety is insured, unless the parties by contract have provided what disposition should be made of the insurance proceeds, the policy and insurance proceeds inure to the benefit of the entire estate even though the policy was issued in the name of only one spouse and paid for by that spouse, and the insurance proceeds become divisible personal property held by the spouses as tenants in common.

Section 41-63. Termination of tenancy by the entirety other than upon death of a spouse; effects of termination.
Events terminating a tenancy by the entirety other than the death of a spouse and the effects of termination include the following: (1) The voluntary sale and conveyance of property held as tenants by the entirety to a third party, including a foreclosure sale pursuant to a power of sale in a deed of trust. Proceeds of the sale, including surplus funds generated from a foreclosure sale, are personal property held by the spouses as tenants in common. (2) The voluntary partition between the spouses executing a joint instrument conveying the property held as tenants by the entirety to themselves as tenants in common or in severalty. (3) The involuntary transfer of title of property held by spouses as tenants by the entirety. The proceeds resulting from the transfer are held by the spouses as tenants by the entirety. An involuntary transfer of title includes: (5) An absolute divorce of the spouses. An absolute divorce converts property held as tenants by the entirety to a tenancy in common.

Section 41-65. Entireties property conveyed to trusts.
(a) Any real property held by spouses as tenants by the entirety and conveyed (i) to a joint trust or (ii) in equal shares to two separate trusts shall no longer be held by the spouses as tenants by the entirety and shall be disposed of by the terms of the trust or trusts. However, subject to subsection (b) of this section, the provisions of G.S. 41-60(a)(1) shall apply to the property held in trust as if the spouses had continued to hold the property as tenants by the entireties. (b) The provisions of G.S. 41-60(a)(1) shall apply to the property held in trust as long as all of the following apply: (1) The spouses remain married. (3) Both spouses are current beneficiaries of the joint trust if the real property is conveyed to that trust or of each separate trust if the property is conveyed in equal shares to their separate trusts. (d) The trustee acting under the express provisions of a trust instrument or with the written consent of both spouses may waive the application of G.S. 41-60(a)(1) as to any specific creditor or any specifically described property including all separate creditors of a spouse or all former tenancy by the entirety property conveyed to the trustee. (4) The spouses are "beneficiaries" of a trust if they are distributees or permissible distributees of the income or principal of the trust whether or not other individuals are also current or future beneficiaries of the trust.

- North Carolina General Statutes - Chapter 51. Marriages - Article 1. General Provisions

Section 51‑1. Requisites of marriage; solemnization.
A valid and sufficient marriage is created by the consent of a male and female person who may lawfully marry, presently to take each other as husband and wife, freely, seriously and plainly expressed by each in the presence of the other, either: ...

Section 51-1.2. (See Editor's note) Marriages between persons of the same gender not valid.
Marriages, whether created by common law, contracted, or performed outside of North Carolina, between individuals of the same gender are not valid in North Carolina.

== North Dakota ==
Ban declared unconstitutional?	Legalized by state?
Yes	No

Texts:

- North Dakota Constitution Article XI. General provisions.

Art. XI - Section 28. Marriage consists only of the legal union between a man and a woman. No other domestic union, however denominated, may be recognized as a marriage or given the same or substantially equivalent legal effect.

- North Dakota Century Code - Title 14 Domestic Relations and Persons

Section 14-03-01. What constitutes marriage - Spouse defined. Marriage is a personal relation arising out of a civil contract between one man and one woman to which the consent of the parties is essential. The marriage relation may be entered into, maintained, annulled, or dissolved only as provided by law. A spouse refers only to a person of the opposite sex who is a husband or a wife.
Section 14-03-08. Foreign marriages recognized - Exception. Except when residents of this state contract a marriage in another state which is prohibited under the laws of this state, all marriages contracted outside this state, which are valid according to the laws of the state or country where contracted, are valid in this state. This section applies only to a marriage contracted in another state or country which is between one man and one woman as husband and wife.

== Ohio ==
Ban declared unconstitutional?	Legalized by state?
Yes	No

Texts:

- Ohio Constitution - Article XV. Miscellaneous - section 11 Marriage Amendment

Only a union between one man and one woman may be a marriage valid in or recognized by this state and its political subdivisions. This state and its political subdivisions shall not create or recognize a legal status for relationships of unmarried individuals that intends to approximate the design, qualities, significance or effect of marriage.

- Ohio Revised Code - Title XXXI Domestic Relations - Children

§ 3101.01. Persons who may be joined in marriage; minor to obtain consent; public policy of state concerning same-sex marriage and extension of certain benefits to nonmarital relationships.
(A) ... A marriage may only be entered into by one man and one woman. ...
(B) ...
(C) (1) Any marriage between persons of the same sex is against the strong public policy of this state. Any marriage between persons of the same sex shall have no legal force or effect in this state and, if attempted to be entered into in this state, is void ab initio and shall not be recognized by this state.
(2) Any marriage entered into by persons of the same sex in any other jurisdiction shall be considered and treated in all respects as having no legal force or effect in this state and shall not be recognized by this state.
(3) The recognition or extension by the state of the specific statutory benefits of a legal marriage to nonmarital relationships between persons of the same sex or different sexes is against the strong public policy of this state. Any public act, record, or judicial proceeding of this state, as defined in section 9.82 of the Revised Code, that extends the specific statutory benefits of legal marriage to nonmarital relationships between persons of the same sex or different sexes is void ab initio. Nothing in division (C)(3) of this section shall be construed to do either of the following:
(a) Prohibit the extension of specific benefits otherwise enjoyed by all persons, married or unmarried, to nonmarital relationships between persons of the same sex or different sexes, including the extension of benefits conferred by any statute that is not expressly limited to married persons, which includes but is not limited to benefits available under Chapter 4117. of the Revised Code;
(b) Affect the validity of private agreements that are otherwise valid under the laws of this state.
(4) Any public act, record, or judicial proceeding of any other state, country, or other jurisdiction outside this state that extends the specific benefits of legal marriage to nonmarital relationships between persons of the same sex or different sexes shall be considered and treated in all respects as having no legal force or effect in this state and shall not be recognized by this state.

== Oklahoma ==
Ban declared unconstitutional?	Legalized by state?
Yes	No

Texts:

- Oklahoma Constitution - Article 2 Bill of rights - Section 35

A. Marriage in this state shall consist only of the union of one man and one woman. Neither this Constitution nor any other provision of law shall be construed to require that marital status or the legal incidents thereof be conferred upon unmarried couples or groups.
B. A marriage between persons of the same gender performed in another state shall not be recognized as valid and binding in this state as of the date of the marriage.
C. Any person knowingly issuing a marriage license in violation of this section shall be guilty of a misdemeanor.

- Oklahoma Statutes - Title 43. Marriage and Family

§43-3.1. Recognition of marriage between persons of same gender prohibited. A marriage between persons of the same gender performed in another state shall not be recognized as valid and binding in this state as of the date of the marriage.

== Oregon ==
Ban declared unconstitutional?	Legalized by state?
Yes	No

Texts:

- Oregon Constitution - Article XV Miscellaneous

Section 5a. Policy regarding marriage. It is the policy of Oregon, and its subdivisions, that only a marriage between one man and one woman shall be valid or legally recognized as a marriage.

== Pennsylvania ==
Ban declared unconstitutional?	Legalized by state?
Yes	No

Texts:

- Pennsylvania Consolidated Statutes - Title 23 Domestic Relations - Chapter 17. Miscellaneous provisions relating to marriage

§ 1704. Marriage between persons of the same sex. It is hereby declared to be the strong and longstanding public policy of this Commonwealth that marriage shall be between one man and one woman. A marriage between persons of the same sex which was entered into in another state or foreign jurisdiction, even if valid where entered into, shall be void in this Commonwealth.

== Rhode Island ==
Ban declared unconstitutional?	Legalized by state?
—N/a	Yes

- TITLE 15 Domestic Relations - CHAPTER 15-1 - Persons Eligible to Marry.

Section 15-1-1: Equal access to marriage.
Any person who otherwise meets the eligibility requirements of chapters 15-1 and 15-2 may marry any other eligible person regardless of gender.

== South Carolina ==
Ban declared unconstitutional?	Legalized by state?
Yes	No

Texts:

- South Carolina Constitution Article XVII Miscellaneous Matters, Section 15

A marriage between one man and one woman is the only lawful domestic union that shall be valid or recognized in this State. This State and its political subdivisions shall not create a legal status, right, or claim respecting any other domestic union, however denominated. This State and its political subdivisions shall not recognize or give effect to a legal status, right, or claim created by another jurisdiction respecting any other domestic union, however denominated. Nothing in this section shall impair any right or benefit extended by the State or its political subdivisions other than a right or benefit arising from a domestic union that is not valid or recognized in this State. This section shall not prohibit or limit parties, other than the State or its political subdivisions, from entering into contracts or other legal instruments.

- South Carolina Code of Laws - Title 20. Domestic Relations - Chapter 1. Marriage

Section 20-1-10. Persons who may contract matrimony.
(A) All persons, except mentally incompetent persons and persons whose marriage is prohibited by this section, may lawfully contract matrimony.
(B) No man shall marry his mother, grandmother, daughter, granddaughter, stepmother, sister, grandfather's wife, son's wife, grandson's wife, wife's mother, wife's grandmother, wife's daughter, wife's granddaughter, brother's daughter, sister's daughter, father's sister, mother's sister, or another man.
(C) No woman shall marry her father, grandfather, son, grandson, stepfather, brother, grandmother's husband, daughter's husband, granddaughter's husband, husband's father, husband's grandfather, husband's son, husband's grandson, brother's son, sister's son, father's brother, mother's brother, or another woman.
SECTION 20-1-15. Prohibition of same sex marriage.
A marriage between persons of the same sex is void ab initio and against the public policy of this State.

== South Dakota ==
Ban declared unconstitutional?	Legalized by state?
Yes	No

Texts:

- South Dakota Constitution - Article XXI Miscellaneous; Section 9. Marriage

Only marriage between a man and a woman shall be valid or recognized in South Dakota. The uniting of two or more persons in a civil union, domestic partnership, or other quasi-marital relationship shall not be valid or recognized in South Dakota.

- South Dakota Codified Laws - Title 25. Domestic relations - Chapter 01. Validity And Performance Of Marriages

25-1-1 Marriage defined—Consent and solemnization required.
Marriage is a personal relation, between a man and a woman, arising out of a civil contract to which the consent of parties capable of making it is necessary. Consent alone does not constitute a marriage; it must be followed by a solemnization.
25-1-38. Validity of marriages contracted outside state—Same-sex marriages excluded. Any marriage contracted outside the jurisdiction of this state, except a marriage contracted between two persons of the same gender, which is valid by the laws of the jurisdiction in which such marriage was contracted, is valid in this state.

== Tennessee ==
Ban declared unconstitutional?	Legalized by state?
Yes	No

Texts:

- Tennessee Constitution - Article XI. MISCELLANEOUS PROVISIONS

Section 18. Marital contract defined. The historical institution and legal contract solemnizing the relationship of one (1) man and one (1) woman shall be the only legally recognized marital contract in this state. Any policy or law or judicial interpretation, purporting to define marriage as anything other than the historical institution and legal contract between one (1) man and one (1) woman, is contrary to the public policy of this state and shall be void and unenforceable in Tennessee. If another state or foreign jurisdiction issues a license for persons to marry and if such marriage is prohibited in this state by the provisions of this section, then the marriage shall be void and unenforceable in this state.

- Tennessee Code Annotated - Title 36. Domestic Relations - Chapter 3. Marriage - Part 1. License

36-3-113. Marriage between one man and one woman only legally recognized marital contract.
(a) Tennessee's marriage licensing laws reinforce, carry forward, and make explicit the long-standing public policy of this state to recognize the family as essential to social and economic order and the common good and as the fundamental building block of our society. To that end, it is further the public policy of this state that the historical institution and legal contract solemnizing the relationship of one (1) man and one (1) woman shall be the only legally recognized marital contract in this state in order to provide the unique and exclusive rights and privileges to marriage.
(b) The legal union in matrimony of only one (1) man and one (1) woman shall be the only recognized marriage in this state.
(c) Any policy, law or judicial interpretation that purports to define marriage as anything other than the historical institution and legal contract between one (1) man and one (1) woman is contrary to the public policy of Tennessee.
(d) If another state or foreign jurisdiction issues a license for persons to marry, which marriages are prohibited in this state, any such marriage shall be void and unenforceable in this state.

== Texas ==
Ban declared unconstitutional?	Legalized by state?
Yes	No

Texts:

- Texas Constitution - Article 1. Bill of Rights - Section 32 - Marriage

(a) Marriage in this state shall consist only of the union of one man and one woman.
(b) This state or a political subdivision of this state may not create or recognize any legal status identical or similar to marriage.

- Texas Family Code - TITLE 1. The marriage relationship

Chapter 2. The marriage relationship - Section 2.001. Marriage license.
(a) A man and a woman desiring to enter into a ceremonial marriage must obtain a marriage license from the county clerk of any county of this state.
(b) A license may not be issued for the marriage of persons of the same sex.
Chapter 6. Suit for dissolution of marriage - Section 6.204. Recognition of same-sex marriage of union.

- (a) In this section, "civil union" means any relationship status other than marriage that:
  - (1) is intended as an alternative to marriage or applies primarily to cohabitating persons; and
  - (2) grants to the parties of the relationship legal protections, benefits, or responsibilities granted to the spouses of a marriage.
- (b) A marriage between persons of the same sex or a civil union is contrary to the public policy of this state and is void in this state.
- (c) The state or an agency or political subdivision of the state may not give effect to a:
  - (1) public act, record, or judicial proceeding that creates, recognizes, or validates a marriage between persons of the same sex or a civil union in this state or in any other jurisdiction; or
  - (2) right or claim to any legal protection, benefit, or responsibility asserted as a result of a marriage between persons of the same sex or a civil union in this state or in any other jurisdiction.

== Utah ==
Ban declared unconstitutional?	Legalized by state?
Yes	No

Texts:

- Utah Constitution - Article 01. Declaration of Rights

Section 29. Marriage.
(1) Marriage consists only of the legal union between a man and a woman.
(2) No other domestic union, however denominated, may be recognized as a marriage or given the same or substantially equivalent legal effect.

- Utah Code - Title 30. Husband and Wife - Chapter 01. Marriage

30-1-4.1. Marriage recognition policy.
(1) (a) It is the policy of this state to recognize as marriage only the legal union of a man and a woman as provided in this chapter.
(b) Except for the relationship of marriage between a man and a woman recognized pursuant to this chapter, this state will not recognize, enforce, or give legal effect to any law creating any legal status, rights, benefits, or duties that are substantially equivalent to those provided under Utah law to a man and a woman because they are married.
(2) Nothing in Subsection (1) impairs any contract or other rights, benefits, or duties that are enforceable independently of this section.

- Utah Code - Title 30. Husband and Wife - Chapter 2. Property Rights

30-2-9. Family expenses -- Joint and several liability.
(1) The expenses of the family and the education of the children are chargeable upon the property of both spouses or of either of them separately, for which expenses they may be sued jointly or separately. (2) For the expenses described in Subsection (1), where there is a written agreement signed by either spouse that allows for the recovery of agreed upon amounts, a creditor or an assignee or successor in interest of the creditor is entitled to recover the contractually allowed amounts against both spouses, jointly and severally. (3) Subsection (2) applies to all contracts and agreements under this section entered into by either spouse during the time the parties are married and living together. (5) The provisions of Subsections (2) and (3) do not create a right to attorney's fees or collection fees as to the nonsigning spouse for purchases of:

== Vermont ==
Ban declared unconstitutional?	Legalized by state?
—N/a	Yes

Texts:

- Title 15. Domestic Relations - Chapter 1. Civil Marriage

§ 8. Marriage definition.
Marriage is the legally recognized union of two people. When used in this chapter or in any other statute, the word "marriage" shall mean a civil marriage. Terms relating to the marital relationship or familial relationships shall be construed consistently with this section for all purposes throughout the law, whether in the context of statute, administrative or court rule, policy, common law, or any other source of civil law.

== Virginia ==
Ban declared unconstitutional?	Legalized by state?
Yes	No

Texts:

- Virginia Constitution - Article I. Bill of Rights - Section 15-A. Marriage.

That only a union between one man and one woman may be a marriage valid in or recognized by this Commonwealth and its political subdivisions. This Commonwealth and its political subdivisions shall not create or recognize a legal status for relationships of unmarried individuals that intends to approximate the design, qualities, significance, or effects of marriage. Nor shall this Commonwealth or its political subdivisions create or recognize another union, partnership, or other legal status to which is assigned the rights, benefits, obligations, qualities, or effects of marriage.

Note: The Virginia General Assembly repealed the statutory ban on same-sex marriage in 2020.

== Washington ==
Ban declared unconstitutional?	Legalized by state?
—N/a	Yes

Texts:

- Washington Revised Code - Title 26. Domestic relations - Chapter 04. Marriage

26.04.010. Marriage contract– Void marriages.
(1) Marriage is a civil contract between two persons who have each attained the age of eighteen years, and who are otherwise capable.
(3) Where necessary to implement the rights and responsibilities of spouses under the law, gender specific terms such as husband and wife used in any statute, rule, or other law must be construed to be gender neutral and applicable to spouses of the same sex.

== West Virginia ==
Ban declared unconstitutional?	Legalized by state?
Yes	No

Texts:

- West Virginia Code - Chapter 48. Domestic relations - Article 2. Marriage

§48-2-603. Certain acts, records, and proceedings not to be given effect in this state.
A public act, record or judicial proceeding of any other state, territory, possession or tribe respecting a relationship between persons of the same sex that is treated as a marriage under the laws of the other state, territory, possession, or tribe, or a right or claim arising from such relationship, shall not be given effect by this state.

== Wisconsin ==
Ban declared unconstitutional?	Legalized by state?
Yes	No

Texts:

- Wisconsin Constitution - Article XIII. Miscellaneous provisions

Section 13. Marriage. Only a marriage between one man and one woman shall be valid or recognized as a marriage in this state. A legal status identical or substantially similar to that of marriage for unmarried individuals shall not be valid or recognized in this state.

- Wisconsin Statutes - Chapter 765. The Family Code (765-768)

765.001(2) Intent. - Extract:

... Under the laws of this state, marriage is a legal relationship between 2 equal persons, a husband and wife, who owe to each other mutual responsibility and support....

765.01 A civil contract.
Marriage, so far as its validity at law is concerned, is a civil contract, to which the consent of the parties capable in law of contracting is essential, and which creates the legal status of husband and wife.
765.04 Marriage abroad to circumvent the laws.
(1) If any person residing and intending to continue to reside in this state who is disabled or prohibited from contracting marriage under the laws of this state goes into another state or country and there contracts a marriage prohibited or declared void under the laws of this state, such marriage shall be void for all purposes in this state with the same effect as though it had been entered into in this state.

(3) No marriage shall be contracted in this state by a party residing and intending to continue to reside in another state or jurisdiction, if such marriage would be void if contracted in such other state or jurisdiction and every marriage celebrated in this state in violation of this provision shall be null and void.

765.30 Penalties.

(1) The following may be fined not more than $10,000 or imprisoned for not more than 9 months or both:
(a) Penalty for marriage outside the state to circumvent the laws. Any person residing and intending to continue to reside in this state who goes outside the state and there contracts a marriage prohibited or declared void under the laws of this state.

== Wyoming ==
Ban declared unconstitutional?	Legalized by state?
Yes	No

Texts:

- Wyoming Statutes - Title 20. Domestic relations - Chapter 1. Husband and wife - Article 1. Creation of marriage

20-1-101. Marriage a civil contract.
Marriage is a civil contract between a male and a female person to which the consent of the parties capable of contracting is essential. 20-1-111. Foreign marriages. All marriage contracts which are valid by the laws of the country in which contracted are valid in this state.

== See also ==
- Same-sex marriage law in the United States by territory
- Public opinion of same-sex marriage in the United States
- Same-sex marriage in the United States
- Same-sex marriage legislation in the United States
- Rights and responsibilities of marriages in the United States
- Marriage Protection Act
- U.S. state constitutional amendments banning same-sex unions
- Federal Marriage Amendment
- Domestic partnership in the United States
- Freedom to Marry
- Timeline of civil marriage in the United States
- Timeline of same-sex marriage
