= Respect for Marriage Act =

2022 U.S. federal law

- Long title: An Act to repeal the Defense of Marriage Act and ensure respect for State regulation of marriage, and for other purposes.
- Acronyms (colloquial): RFMA
- Enacted by: the 117th United States Congress
- Effective: December 13, 2022
- Number of co-sponsors: 189

Citations
- Public law: Pub. L. 117–228 (text) (PDF)
- Statutes at Large: 136 Stat. 2305

Codification
- Acts repealed: Defense of Marriage Act
- Titles amended: 1 U.S.C.: General Provisions; 28 U.S.C.: Judiciary and Judicial Procedure
- U.S.C. sections amended: 1 U.S.C. § 7; 28 U.S.C. § 1738C

Legislative history
- Introduced in the House as H.R. 8404 by Jerry Nadler (D–NY) on July 18, 2022; Committee consideration by House Judiciary; Passed the House on July 19, 2022 (267–157); Passed the Senate on November 29, 2022 (61–36) with amendment; House agreed to Senate amendment on December 8, 2022 (258–169–1); Signed into law by President Joe Biden on December 13, 2022

The Respect for Marriage Act (RFMA; H.R. 8404) is a landmark federal statute passed by the 117th United States Congress in 2022 and signed into law by President Joe Biden. It repeals the Defense of Marriage Act (DOMA), requires the U.S. government and all U.S. states and territories (though not tribes) to recognize the validity of same-sex and interracial civil marriages in the United States, and protects religious liberty. Its first version in 2009 was supported by former Republican U.S. representative Bob Barr, the original sponsor of DOMA, and former president Bill Clinton, who signed DOMA in 1996. Iterations of the proposal were put forth in the 111th, 112th, 113th, 114th, and 117th Congresses.

On June 26, 2015, the U.S. Supreme Court ruled in Obergefell v. Hodges that the Fourteenth Amendment requires all U.S. states to recognize same-sex marriages. This decision rendered the last remaining provision of DOMA unenforceable and made same-sex marriage federal law. The future of same-sex marriage in the United States was put back into question in 2022, when a concurring opinion by Justice Clarence Thomas in Dobbs v. Jackson Women's Health Organization argued the Court "should reconsider" the Obergefell decision. RFMA officially repealed DOMA and requires the federal government to recognize same-sex and interracial marriages, codifying parts of Obergefell, the 2013 ruling in United States v. Windsor, and the 1967 ruling in Loving v. Virginia. In addition, it compels all U.S. states and territories to recognize the validity of same-sex and interracial marriages if performed in a jurisdiction where such marriages are legally performed; this extends the recognition of same-sex marriages to American Samoa, the remaining U.S. territory to refuse to perform or recognize same-sex marriages.

In July 2022, RFMA was reintroduced to Congress, with revisions including protections for interracial marriages. The act passed the House in a bipartisan vote on July 19, 2022. Senator Tammy Baldwin of Wisconsin announced on November 14, 2022, that a bipartisan deal had been struck, and that they expected the legislation to reach 60 votes to break the filibuster. A motion of cloture passed 62–37 in the Senate on November 16. On November 29, the Senate passed it by a 61–36 vote, with a large majority of Senate nays originating from Republican senators in the Southern United States. On December 8, the House agreed to the Senate amendment by a 258–169 vote, with one member voting present (abstention). 39 Republicans voted yea. President Biden signed the bill into law on December 13, 2022. Public opinion polls of same-sex marriage in the United States indicate a strong majority of Americans are in favor; Public opinion polls of interracial marriage is supported almost universally.

The final version of the bill divided American religious groups morally opposed to same-sex marriage; it was supported by some as a suitable compromise between the rights of LGBTQ couples and religious liberty, a position that was taken by the Church of Jesus Christ of Latter-day Saints, and was also supported by the Episcopal Church, the Evangelical Lutheran Church in America, the Union for Reform Judaism, the United Church of Christ, the Unitarian Universalist Association, and the Presbyterian Church (USA). The bill was prominently opposed by the U.S. Conference of Catholic Bishops and the Southern Baptist Convention due to their views on sexual ethics.

== Background ==
Prior to the Supreme Court's 1967 ruling in Loving, anti-miscegenation laws were still in force in 16 states, all prohibiting interracial marriage. Until 1996, the federal government of the United States customarily recognized marriages conducted legally in any state for the purpose of federal legislation. Following an unsuccessful lawsuit aimed at legalizing same-sex marriage in Hawaii, the United States Congress passed the Defense of Marriage Act, one section of which forbids the federal government from recognizing same-sex marriages. The Supreme Court ruled this section unconstitutional in the 2013 case United States v. Windsor.

In June 2022, the Court ruled in Dobbs v. Jackson Women's Health Organization that the Constitution does not confer the right to an abortion, overturning the 50-year-old precedent of Roe v. Wade. Writing for the majority, Samuel Alito stated that fears that the same arguments that overturned Roe might also touch upon "matters such as intimate sexual relations, contraception, and marriage" were "unfounded". However, in a concurring opinion, Clarence Thomas argued that the Court should go further in future cases, reconsidering other past Supreme Court decisions that granted rights based on substantive due process, such as Griswold v. Connecticut (the right to contraception), Obergefell v. Hodges (the right to same-sex marriage), and Lawrence v. Texas (the right to engage in private sexual acts).

In response, in July 2022 the House passed bills aimed to protect rights that Thomas had mentioned, with the Respect for Marriage Act specifically ensuring that the right to same-sex and interracial marriages would remain part of federal statute law even if the Court ruled at some future date that they were not constitutionally guaranteed.

=== Repealing the 1996 Defense of Marriage Act ===
The Respect for Marriage Act repealed the 1996 Defense of Marriage Act (DOMA).

DOMA barred the federal government from treating same-sex couples who were married under state law as married couples. Thus, DOMA prevented federal recognition of such marriages for purposes of Social Security benefits, tax benefits, and more.

Furthermore, DOMA stated that the Full Faith and Credit Clause of the Constitution did not require states to respect the marriages of same-sex couples performed by other states. The Supreme Court's decision in United States v. Windsor (2013) struck down this section of DOMA, but after Dobbs’ overturning of Roe, there was concern that Windsor could be overturned by the Supreme Court in the future. RFMA replaced this portion of DOMA with a statement that the Full Faith and Credit Clause requires interstate recognition of same-sex marriages.

== Content ==
In addition to requiring all states to recognize interracial or same-sex marriages performed in another domestic or foreign jurisdiction, the law also requires all territories and possessions of the United States to recognize marriages performed elsewhere. Prior to enactment of the act, American Samoa was the only U.S. territory which neither performed nor recognized same-sex marriages, even if performed legally in another jurisdiction of the United States or elsewhere. It does not apply to federally recognized Native American nations, which are free to determine their own policy on performance and recognition.

=== Marriage validity ===
In addition to repealing the DOMA, the legislation establishes a method for the federal government to determine whether a marriage is valid for federal purposes, a legal dilemma known as choice of laws. Anticipating that federal courts and administrators would need to determine the validity for federal purposes of a marriage that is recognized in one state and not another, or in a foreign country and not by every U.S. state, it creates two tests. If celebrated in a state of the U.S. (with "state" interpreted to include territories and the District of Columbia), a marriage is valid for federal purposes if valid in that state. If celebrated elsewhere, a marriage is valid for federal purposes if it is valid in at least one U.S. state.

Legal scholars disputed whether the language of the Respect for Marriage Act was an appropriate solution to the problem. Lynn Wardle wrote that it "is substantively biased to circumvent state policies that do not allow or recognize same-sex marriage" and "a violation of federalism". William Baude endorsed the language of the Respect for Marriage Act. He argued that the options are to give priority to the place a marriage is celebrated or to the domicile of the married couple, that one's domicile is more easily manipulated, and that basing the choice of law on the place of celebration "promotes predictability and stability".

Law scholar Ilya Somin writes that the provision requiring states to recognize same-sex marriages contracted in other states is more likely to have constitutionality issues in the court system than the provisions that apply to the definition of marriage used in federal law; he also notes that the act contains a severability provision in case one part of the act is found unconstitutional.

== Legislative progress ==
=== 111th Congress (2009–2011) ===
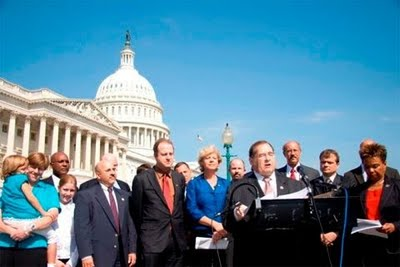
Rep. Jerry Nadler introducing the Respect for Marriage Act in 2009

The 2009 bill was introduced by U.S. representative Jerrold Nadler of New York on September 15, 2009, and garnered 120 cosponsors.

=== 112th Congress (2011–2013) ===
The 2011 bill was introduced by U.S. representative Jerrold Nadler of New York on March 16, 2011, and a U.S. Senate version was introduced by Dianne Feinstein of California on the same day. President Barack Obama announced his support for the bill on July 19, 2011.

==== House ====
In September 2011, Ileana Ros-Lehtinen of Florida became the 125th cosponsor of the bill in the U.S. House of Representatives and the first Republican member of the U.S. Congress to announce support for the bill. In December 2012, Richard Hanna and Charles Bass became the next Republicans to cosponsor the bill.

==== Senate ====
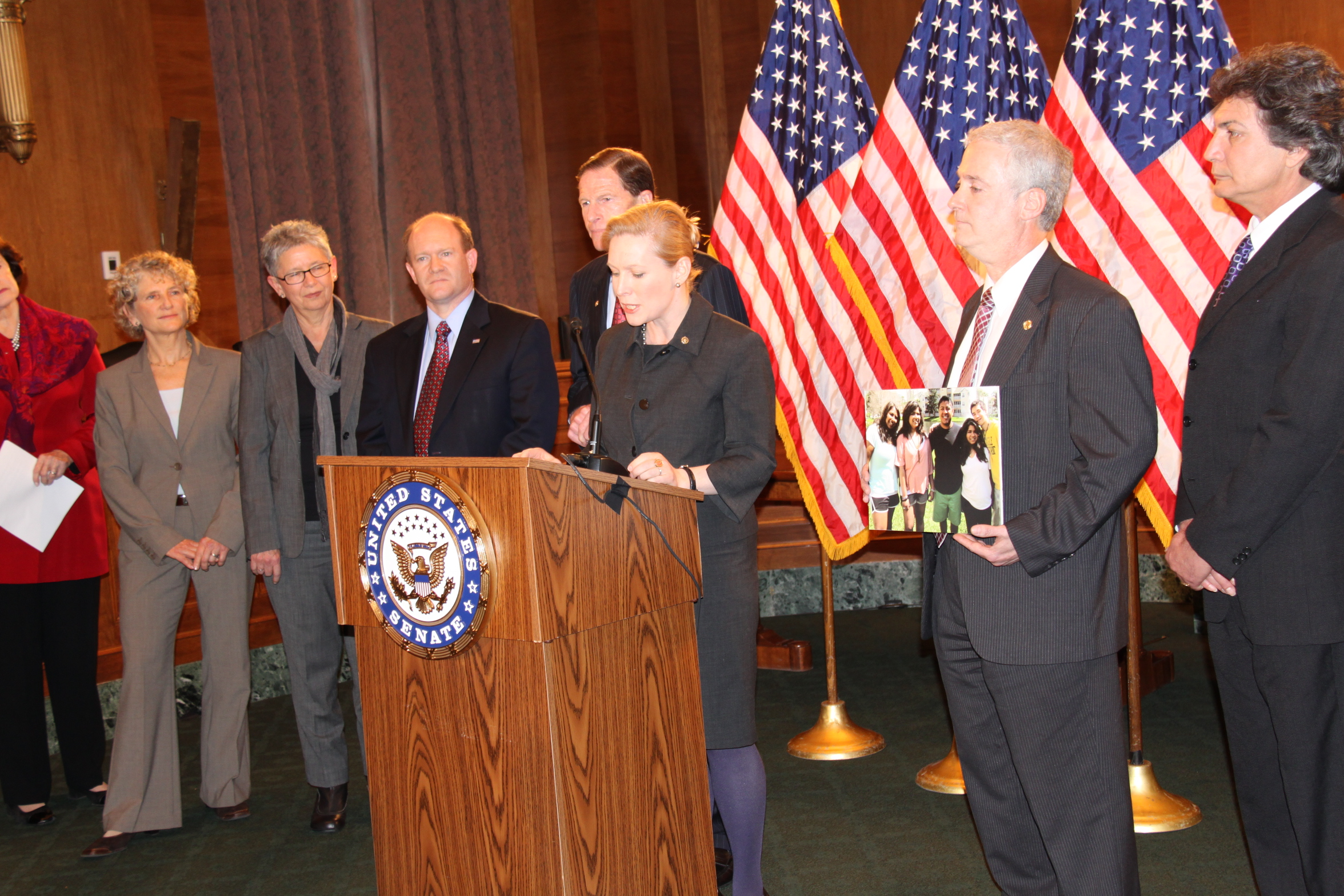
Sen. Kirsten Gillibrand introducing the Respect for Marriage Act in 2011

On July 20, 2011, Sen. Patrick Leahy of Vermont chaired the first-ever congressional hearing on a proposal to repeal the Defense of Marriage Act (DOMA). On October 25, 2011, Leahy announced that the Senate Judiciary Committee would begin debate on November 3, 2011, with a committee vote likely to happen the following week. On November 3, 2011, the bill was debated in the Senate Judiciary Committee, where its passage was a foregone conclusion due to sufficient votes to pass being found in the 10 Democratic members of the committee, who are cosponsors of the bill; however, Republicans on the Committee requested the vote be delayed one week. During the debate Sen. Feinstein noted that DOMA denies same-sex couples more than 1,100 federal rights and benefits that are provided to all other members of that class, legally married couples, including rights to Social Security spousal benefits, protection from estate taxes when a spouse passes away, and the ability to file taxes jointly and claim certain deductions. The Senate Judiciary Committee voted 10–8 in favor of advancing the bill to the Senate floor.

=== 113th Congress (2013–2015) ===
The bill's sponsors decided not to reintroduce the Respect for Marriage Act in 2013 until the United States Supreme Court issued a decision in United States v. Windsor. They reintroduced it on June 26, the same day the Court ruled in that case that Section 3 of the Defense of Marriage Act was unconstitutional.

=== 114th Congress (2015–2017) ===
The aforementioned lawmakers Representative Jerrold Nadler of New York and Senator Dianne Feinstein of California reintroduced the legislation on the first day of the 114th Congress. Nadler remarked, "We must finish the job begun by the Supreme Court". In terms of co-sponsors, the proposal soon accrued 77 co-sponsors in the House and 41 in the Senate. The news received a warm welcome from LGBT rights groups such as the American Military Partner Association, which stated that Congressional action had to take place in order to assist same-sex military couples seeking veterans benefits.

Section 2 of DOMA, the last substantive provision of that act remaining viable after United States v. Windsor, was rendered obsolete in Obergefell v. Hodges in June 2015.

=== 117th Congress (2021–2023) ===
The Supreme Court ruling in Dobbs v. Jackson Women's Health Organization in June 2022 overturned Roe v. Wade and Planned Parenthood v. Casey. In his concurrence, Justice Clarence Thomas postulated that the court should revisit other past cases which granted rights based on substantive due process, including the right of same-sex marriages from Obergefell, leading to concerns from lawmakers.

==== First House vote ====
In July 2022, the House Judiciary Committee chairman Jerrold Nadler (D-NY), Senator Dianne Feinstein (D-CA), Congressional LGBTQ+ Equality Caucus chairman David Cicilline (D-RI), Senator Tammy Baldwin (D-WI) and Senator Susan Collins (R-ME) announced the re-introduction of the Respect for Marriage Act, which was revised to include protections for interracial marriages to codify Loving v. Virginia. The act passed the House (267–157) on July 19, 2022, with 47 Republicans joining all Democrats in voting in the affirmative.

==== Senate passage ====
November 29 Senate vote by state: Two yeas Yea and not voting Yea and Nay Two Nays Nay and not voting

The Senate initially planned to vote on the bill before the 2022 midterm elections. However, because it was unclear whether it would receive enough votes to end debate, the consideration of the bill was delayed by Senate Majority Leader Chuck Schumer. On November 14, 2022, a group of bipartisan senators, including Rob Portman (R-OH), Kyrsten Sinema (D-AZ), Thom Tillis (R-NC), Tammy Baldwin (D-WI), and Susan Collins (R-ME) announced they had reached an amendment compromise to include language for religious protections and clarify that the bill did not legalize polygamous marriage. The amendment specifies that nonprofit religious organizations will not be required to provide services for the solemnization or celebration of a same-sex marriage. Shortly after, Schumer announced that he would bring the modified bill to the Senate floor.

On November 16, 2022, the Senate invoked cloture on the motion to proceed (62–37) to the amended bill. All 50 Democratic senators and 12 Republicans (Roy Blunt, Richard Burr, Shelley Moore Capito, Susan Collins, Joni Ernst, Cynthia Lummis, Lisa Murkowski, Rob Portman, Mitt Romney, Dan Sullivan, Thom Tillis, and Todd Young) voted in favor of advancing the bill.

On November 29, 2022, the Senate voted 61–36 to pass the bill. Voting in favor of the bill were 49 Democrats and the same 12 Republicans who had voted to advance it. Two Republicans (Ben Sasse and Patrick Toomey) and one Democrat (Raphael Warnock, who co-sponsored the bill) did not vote.

==== Second House vote ====
December 8 House vote by district: Democratic Yea Republican Yea Republican Nay Republican Present Vacant

On December 8, 2022, the House passed (258–169–1) the Senate's version of the act, with 39 Republicans joining all Democrats in voting in the affirmative.

=== Signing into law ===
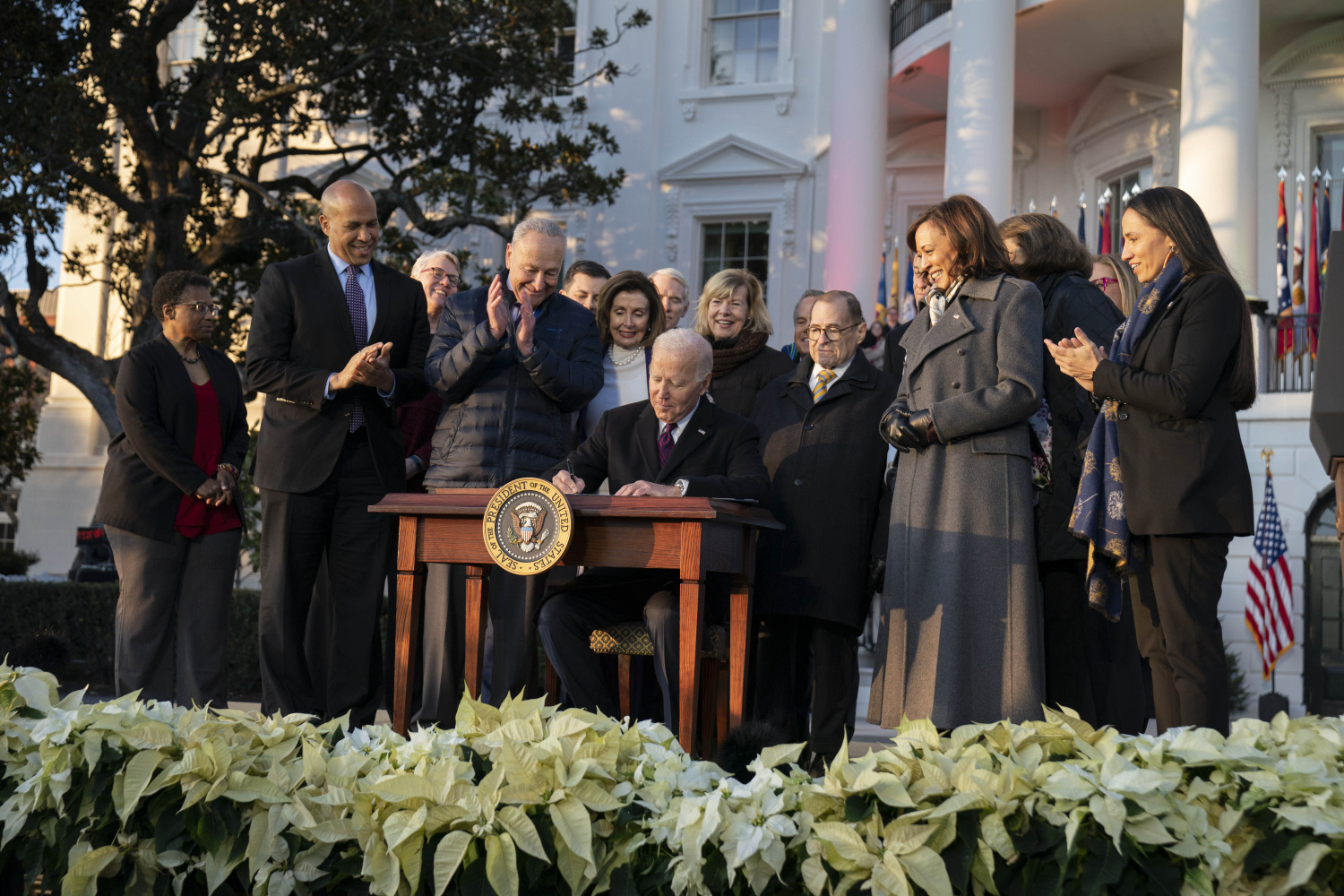
President Biden signing the bill into law at the White House on December 13, 2022

On December 13, 2022, Biden signed the Respect for Marriage Act into law in a ceremony that was held on the White House lawn. Pelosi, Schumer, Harris, and Biden all spoke at the event, which also featured performances by the Gay Men's Chorus of Washington, D.C., as well as musicians Sam Smith and Cyndi Lauper. Gina Nortonsmith and Heidi Nortonsmith, the lesbian couple who was one of seven same-sex couples who sued the state of Massachusetts for same-sex marriage rights in the 2003 Goodridge v. Department of Public Health case, were among those who spoke at the event as well.

== Legislative history ==
As of December 13, 2022:

Congress	Short title	Bill number(s)	Date introduced	Sponsor(s)	# of cosponsors	Latest status
111th Congress	Respect for Marriage Act of 2009	H.R. 3567	September 15, 2009	Rep. Jerrold Nadler (D–NY)	120	Referred to the House Judiciary Committee Referred to the House Judiciary Subcommittee on the Constitution, Civil Rights, and Civil Liberties.
112th Congress	Respect for Marriage Act of 2011	S. 598	March 16, 2011	Sen. Dianne Feinstein (D–CA)	32	Approved by Senate Judiciary Committee; sent to Senate floor.
112th Congress	Respect for Marriage Act of 2011	H.R. 1116	March 16, 2011	Rep. Jerrold Nadler (D–NY)	160	Referred to the House Judiciary Committee
113th Congress	Respect for Marriage Act	S. 1236	June 26, 2013	Sen. Dianne Feinstein (D–CA)	45	Referred to the Senate Judiciary Committee
113th Congress	Respect for Marriage Act	H.R. 2523	June 26, 2013	Rep. Jerrold Nadler (D–NY)	183	Referred to the House Judiciary Committee
114th Congress	Respect for Marriage Act	S. 29	January 6, 2015	Sen. Dianne Feinstein (D–CA)	44	Referred to the Senate Judiciary Committee
114th Congress	Respect for Marriage Act	H.R. 197	January 6, 2015	Rep. Jerrold Nadler (D–NY)	152	Referred to the House Judiciary Committee
117th Congress	Respect for Marriage Act	H.R. 8404	July 18, 2022	Rep. Jerrold Nadler (D–NY)	189	Passed the House of Representatives (267–157); Passed the Senate with amendment (61–36); House agreed to the Senate amendment (258–169–1); Signed into law by President Joe Biden
117th Congress	Respect for Marriage Act	S. 4556	July 19, 2022	Sen. Dianne Feinstein (D–CA)	43	Referred to the Senate Judiciary Committee

== Public opinion ==
Degree of public support for same-sex marriage by state in 2024: 80–87% 70–79% 60–69% 50–59%

=== Same-sex marriage ===
A September 2022 Grinnell College National Poll found that 74% of Americans believe same-sex marriage should be a guaranteed right while 13% disagreed and 13% were uncertain.

Gallup found that nationwide public support for marriage equality for same-sex couples reached 50% in May 2011, 60% in May 2015, and 70% in May 2021.

The Pew Research Center found 40% in 2010, 50% in 2013, and 61% in 2019. By 2016, 83% of Americans aged 18–29 supported same-sex marriage. In 2018, 60% of Americans said they would not mind if their child married someone of the same gender.

Annual polling conducted by Gallup each May in 2017, 2018, 2019 and 2020 has found support for same-sex marriage stable, with two-thirds of Americans indicating that same-sex marriage should be recognized as valid under law (a range of 63% to 67% was recorded). In 2020, 67% of respondents stated that same-sex marriage should be legally recognized as valid under the law.

As of 2021, there is majority support for same-sex marriage in 47 states, ranging from 50% in South Carolina to 85% in Massachusetts. There is plurality support in Alabama, with 49% supporting and 47% opposing. Only Mississippi and Arkansas have majority opposition to same-sex marriage; in Mississippi, 55% oppose and 44% support, while in Arkansas, 52% oppose and 47% support same-sex marriage.

=== Interracial marriage ===
Gallup found that nationwide public support for interracial marriage rose from around 4% in 1958, more than 50% in 1994, to 94% in 2021.

Interracial marriage features prominently in the Respect for Marriage Act. Interracial marriage was first legalized through the landmark Supreme Court case Loving v. Virginia in 1967, in which the Warren Court established that the laws prohibiting interracial marriage were in violation of the Equal Protection and Due Process Clauses of the Fourteenth Amendment of the Constitution. According to Gallup polls of United States public opinion, approval for interracial marriage has increased from 4% in 1958 to 94% in 2021 and the highest approval rating of 98% is from Americans between the ages of 18 and 29.

The issue of interracial marriage was not raised in the original Defense of Marriage Act (DOMA) that would lead to the passage of the Respect for Marriage Act. The new language of the Respect for Marriage Act requires states to approve and acknowledge out-of-state marriage licenses issued to interracial couples.

Despite overwhelming public support for interracial marriage, the June 2022 overturn of Roe v. Wade and Planned Parenthood v. Casey raised additional concerns that interracial marriage was being threatened by the Supreme Court. Loving v. Virginia, Obergefell v. Hodges, and the recently overturned Roe v. Wade were decided under the due process clause of the Fourteenth Amendment and this is what many believe to be the cause to include interracial marriage as protected under the Respect for Marriage Act. Cause for concern was also that some politicians, like Senator Mike Braun, had seemingly started to call into question the Loving v. Virginia decision.

=== Politicians' opinions ===
The Respect for Marriage Act passed with a vote of 258 Yeas–169 Nays (1 present and 4 not voting) on December 8, 2022, and was signed into law by President Biden on December 13, 2022. A total of 39 Republicans joined all 219 Democrats in voting to pass the bill; U.S representative Adam Kinzinger intended to vote yes but was absent from the final vote. Thus, the bill is considered to have been a bipartisan vote – the most pro-LGBTQ vote in Congressional history.

The main vocalized objection to Republican opposition to the bill is its possible implications of limits to religious freedom. Florida Republican Mario Díaz-Balart was quoted on his opinion of the bill: "My record shows that I am a long-standing advocate against discrimination of all types. I, however, cannot support any effort that undermines religious liberties by failing to provide legitimate safeguards for Faith-Based organizations that object based on their deeply-held religious beliefs." Representative Díaz-Balart voted in opposition of the bill. Florida Republican, Representative María Elvira Salazar joined Díaz-Balart in opposition. She stated: "I voted for the first version of the bill because I believe in human dignity and respect for all individuals. However, we cannot pass laws that advance one interest and bypass long-held legal protections for others."

In order for the bill to have been successful as a bipartisan vote, the final bill included an amendment to ease some Republicans' concerns about impacts to religious liberty. Wisconsin Republican Mike Gallagher voted against the bill during the first House vote but supported the bill following the Senate's amendments, citing the religious liberty amendment and clarification that the bill would not authorize federal recognition of polygamy.

President Biden signed the Respect for Marriage Act into law on December 13, 2022, and he and Vice President Harris gave their opinion of the act in a speech prior to signing the bill. The speeches from Vice President Harris and President Biden highlighted other parts of the history of same-sex marriage, such as the movement against Proposition 8. The president also referenced Mildred and Richard Loving, and told the story of their Supreme Court case, as well as the case of Edie Windsor. The president also mentioned specific members of the Senate, namely senators Tammy Baldwin, Susan Collins, Chuck Schumer, Rob Portman, Kyrsten Sinema, Thom Tillis, Dianne Feinstein, and Cory Booker, and Speaker of the House Nancy Pelosi, as well as Jerry Nadler.

=== Religious organizations ===
The final version of the bill divided American religious groups opposed to same-sex marriage. It was supported by some, such as the Church of Jesus Christ of Latter-day Saints, as a suitable compromise between the rights of LGBT couples and religious liberty, while it was prominently opposed by the United States Conference of Catholic Bishops and the Southern Baptist Convention due to their views on sexuality.

On November 15, 2022, the Church of Jesus Christ of Latter-day Saints released a statement regarding the RFMA, calling a bill that included "religious freedom protections while ... preserving the rights of ... LGBTQ [people] ... the way forward", while stating that church doctrine would remain unchanged in not recognizing same-sex marriages.

On December 1, 2022, the United States Conference of Catholic Bishops stated that "This bill fails to include clear, comprehensive, and affirmative conscience protections for religious organizations and individuals who uphold the sanctity of traditional marriage that are needed."

Baptist Joint Committee leaders in support of the bill criticized opponents for stoking unreasonable fear that civil rights for others would mean less religious rights for themselves. They noted the bill deals with civil marriage and has no impact on the institution of religious rites of marriage.

Other denominations supported the measure. It was supported by over 40 other faith organizations, most of which allow for same-sex weddings in their facilities and affirm LGBT parishioners, in a joint letter to the Senate, including the Episcopal Church, the Evangelical Lutheran Church in America, Hindus for Human Rights, the Interfaith Alliance, Jewish Women International, Muslims for Progressive Values, the National Council of Jewish Women, the Presbyterian Church (USA), the Reconstructionist Rabbinical Association, the Religious Action Center of Reform Judaism, the Sikh Coalition, the Union for Reform Judaism, the Unitarian Universalist Association, and the United Church of Christ.

=== Activist opinions ===
LGBTQ rights activists praised the Respect for Marriage Act for codifying into law some of the protections of Obergefell but argue that the act still falls short of everything that Obergefell protected. Activists and scholars highlight some important limitations of the bill, such as the act not requiring nonprofit religious organizations "to provide services, accommodations, advantages, facilities, goods, or privileges for the solemnization or celebration of a marriage." At the same time, activists acknowledge that the bipartisan support of the bill is noteworthy, and that it shows a significant change in public opinion that is reflected in the actions of government representatives.

== See also ==
- History of same-sex marriage in the United States § Respect for Marriage Act (2009)
- Marriage age in the United States
- Marriage Protection Act (2004)
- Rights and responsibilities of marriages in the United States
- Social policy of the Joe Biden administration § LGBT rights
- State Marriage Defense Act – proposed conservative law
- The full text of Respect for Marriage Act at Wikisource
