= Public opinion of same-sex marriage in the United States =

Degree of public support for same-sex marriage by state in 2024: 80–87% 70–79% 60–69% 50–59%

Public opinion of same-sex marriage in the United States has significantly changed since the 1990s, and the overwhelming majority of Americans now favor same-sex marriage.

From 1988 to 2009, support for recognized same-sex marriage increased between 1% and 1.5% per year, and accelerated thereafter, rising above 50% in Pew Research Center polling for the first time in 2011. A 2025 Public Religion Research Institute poll found that a majority of people in every state and the District of Columbia support same-sex marriage except in Arkansas, where slightly below 50% support it, and Mississippi, where 47% support it.

A 2023 New York Times/Siena poll found that 70% of Americans support same-sex marriage and 22% oppose it. Younger generations report higher approval; in the 2022 General Social Survey, almost 80% of 18–34 year olds either agreed or strongly agreed that same-sex couples should have the right to marry. Garretson (2018) writes: "The transformation of America's response to homosexuality has been — and continues to be — one of the most rapid and sustained shifts in mass attitudes since the start of public polling."

According to Gallup, in July 2015, just after Obergefell was decided, 74% of Democrats, 62% of independents, and 30% of Republicans agreed that same-sex marriages should be legally recognized. A year later, support had jumped to 79% of Democrats, 65% of independents, and 40% of Republicans. In 2021 and 2022, support was at 83% and 87% among Democrats and 72% and 77% among independents, while Republican support reached a record high of 55% in both years. In May 2025, a record-high 88% of Democrats and 76% of independents supported same-sex marriage, while Republican support dipped back down to 41%.

== Overview ==
Public opinion of same-sex marriage in the United States has changed radically since polling of the American people regarding the issue was first conducted in 1988. The issue of same-sex marriage was not brought up as an issue for public debate until at least the 1950s and was not a political issue until the 1970s. According to statistician Nate Silver of the poll aggregator FiveThirtyEight, from 1988 to April 2009, support for same-sex marriage increased between 1% and 1.5% per year and about 4% from April 2009 to August 2010. A Pew Research Center poll, conducted from May 21, 2008, to May 25, 2008, found that, for the first time, a majority of Americans did not oppose same-sex marriage, with opposition having fallen to 49%. An ABC News/Washington Post poll, conducted from April 21, 2009, to April 24, 2009, found that, for the first time, a plurality of Americans supported same-sex marriage at 49% and that a majority of Americans supported the marriages of same-sex couples validly entered into in one state being recognized in all states at 53%. A CNN/Opinion Research poll, conducted from August 6, 2010, to August 10, 2010, found that, for the first time, a majority of Americans supported same-sex marriage at 52%. A Greenberg Quinlan Rosner Research poll, conducted from January 25, 2015, to January 31, 2015, found that, for the first time, 60% of Americans supported same-sex marriage. This was five months before the landmark June 26, 2015 Supreme Court decision, Obergefell v. Hodges, which ruled that the fundamental right to marry is guaranteed to same-sex couples by both the Due Process Clause and the Equal Protection Clause of the Fourteenth Amendment of the Constitution. The 5–4 ruling required all 50 states, the District of Columbia, and the Insular Areas to perform and recognize the marriages of same-sex couples on the same terms and conditions as the marriages of opposite-sex couples, with equal rights and responsibilities. Prior to Obergefell, same-sex marriage had already been established by statute, court ruling, or voter initiative in 36 states, the District of Columbia, and Guam.

Continual polling by Gallup over the course of more than two decades has shown that support for same-sex marriage has grown rapidly, while opposition has simultaneously collapsed. In 1996, 68% of Americans opposed same-sex marriage, while only 27% supported. In 2018, 67% of Americans supported same-sex marriage, while only 31% opposed. As of 2018, 60% of Americans said they would not mind if their child married someone of the same gender.

== National polls ==
=== Since Obergefell v. Hodges ===
==== 2020–present ====
A May 2026 Gallup poll found that 65% of Americans (87% of Democrats, 67% of Independents, and 37% of Republicans) believed that same-sex marriages should be valid, while 32% opposed it.

A 2025 Public Religion Research Institute poll found that a majority of people in every state and the District of Columbia support same-sex marriage except in Arkansas, where slightly below 50% support it, and Mississippi, where 47% support it.

A May 2025 Gallup poll found that 68% of Americans (88% of Democrats, 76% of Independents, and 41% of Republicans) supported same-sex marriage, while 29% opposed it.

A Religious Landscape Study by Pew Research conducted between 2023 and 2024 found that 67% of American adults favored same-sex marriage while 32% opposed it.

A 2024 Gallup poll found that 69% of Americans (83% of Democrats, 74% of Independents, and 46% of Republicans) supported same-sex marriage, while 29% opposed it.

A 2023 poll by the New York Times and Siena College Research Institute found that 70% of Americans supported same-sex marriage, while 22% opposed it.

A 2023 Gallup poll found that 71% of Americans supported same-sex marriage, while 28% opposed it.

According to The Nation, a private poll conducted by Centerline Action before the passage of the Respect for Marriage Act in late 2022 found that 73% of Americans support same-sex marriage; the percentage of Americans opposed to same-sex marriage was not listed.

A December 2022 Quinnipiac University poll found that 68% of Americans supported same-sex marriage, while 22 percent opposed it.

A September 2022 Grinnell College National Poll found that 74% of Americans believe same-sex marriage should be a guaranteed right while 13% disagreed and 13% were uncertain.

A May 2022 Gallup poll found that 71% of Americans supported same-sex marriage, while 28% were against.

The 2022 American Values Atlas by Public Religion Research Institute found that 69% of Americans supported same-sex marriage, while 28% opposed it.

A June 2021 CBS News/YouGov poll found that 64% of Americans supported same-sex marriage while 36% were opposed. Two-thirds of Republicans over age 45 are opposed, but the opinions of Republicans under age 45 are almost evenly split with 52% oppose and 48% support same sex marriage.

A 2021 Public Religion Research Institute poll found that 67% of Americans supported same-sex marriage, while 32% were opposed.

A June 2021 Gallup poll found that 70% of Americans supported same-sex marriage and 29% were against.

A June 2020 Gallup poll found that 67% of Americans supported same sex marriage, while 31% were against, matching their May 2018 record high.

A Public Religion Research Institute nationwide & state-by-state poll conducted in 2020 found that 67% of Americans supported same-sex marriage, 27% opposed, and 5% refused to answer or answered "don't know," with there being majority support for same-sex marriage in 46 states, and plurality support in 4 states.

A 2020 American National Election Studies poll found that 66% of Americans supported legal recognition of same-sex marriage, 20% supported civil unions, while 14% of Americans were opposed to any legal recognition of same-sex relationships.

==== 2016–2019 ====
A June 2019 CBS News poll found that 67% of Americans supported same-sex marriage, while 28% were against.

A June 2019 IPSOS/Reuters poll found that 58% of Americans supported same-sex marriage, while 28% were against.

A May 2019 Pew Research Center poll found 61% of Americans supported same-sex marriage while 31% were against.

A May 2019 Gallup poll found that 63% of Americans supported same sex marriage, with 36% opposing it. While this is a drop when compared to 2018, same sex marriage approval still remains stable.

A May 2018 Gallup poll found that 67% of Americans supported same-sex marriage, 31% opposed, and 2% had no opinion.

An April 2018 NBC News poll found that 64% of Americans supported same-sex marriage, 33% opposed, and 3% had no opinion. The poll was reported by NBC News as notable as it found that 55% of Southerners supported same-sex marriage, which represented an historic change for a region that was previously staunchly opposed.

A Public Religion Research Institute nationwide & state-by-state poll conducted throughout 2017 found that 61% of Americans supported same-sex marriage, 30% opposed, and 9% refused to answer or answered "don't know," with there being majority support for same-sex marriage in 44 states, plurality support in 4 states, plurality opposition in 1 state, and majority opposition in 1 state.

An August 2017 NBC News/The Wall Street Journal poll found that 60% of Americans supported same-sex marriage, 33% opposed, and 7% had no opinion.

A June 2017 Pew Research Center poll found 62% of Americans supported same-sex marriage, 32% opposed, and 6% had no opinion. This marked the first Pew poll where a majority of Baby Boomers supported same-sex marriage, did not oppose same-sex marriage.

A May 2017 Gallup poll found 64% of Americans supported same-sex marriage, 34% opposed, and 2% had no opinion. This marked the first Gallup poll where a majority of Protestants supported same-sex marriage.

A May 2016 Gallup poll found 61% of Americans supported same-sex marriage, 37% opposed, and 2% had no opinion. This marked the first Gallup poll where a majority of Americans aged 65 and older supported same-sex marriage.

=== Before Obergefell v. Hodges ===
==== 2010–2015 ====
===== 2015 =====
A May Gallup poll found 60% of Americans supported same-sex marriage, 37% opposed, and 3% had no opinion.

A February–March Wall Street Journal poll found that 59% of Americans favored same-sex marriage.

A January–February Human Rights Campaign poll found that 60% of Americans favored same-sex marriage, while 37% opposed. The same poll also found that 46% of respondents knew a same-sex couple who had gotten married.

A February 12–15 CNN/ORC poll found that 63% of Americans believed same-sex marriage is a constitutional right, while 36% disagreed.

===== 2014 =====
A May Gallup poll found that 55% of Americans supported same-sex marriage, 42% opposed, and 4% had no opinion.

An April Public Religion Research Institute poll sponsored by the Ford Foundation found that 55% of all Americans supported same-sex marriage, while 39% were opposed.

A Pew Research Center poll released in March found 54% of Americans favored same-sex marriage, 39% opposed, and 7% didn't know. It also researched support for same-sex marriage among Republican leaning voters in the United States. 61% of Republican leaning voters aged 18–29 supported allowing same-sex couples to marry, while only 27% of Republican leaning voters over 50 years of age were supportive. 52% of Republican voters aged 18–50 supported same-sex marriage.

A Washington Post/ABC News poll from February–March found that a record high of 59% of Americans approved of same-sex marriage, with only 34% opposed and 7% with no opinion. The poll also revealed that 53% of the population in the states that did not allow same-sex couples to marry at the time approved of same-sex marriage. 50% of respondents agreed that the Equal Protection Clause of the Fourteenth Amendment to the U.S. Constitution guarantees the freedom to marry regardless of sex or sexual orientation, while 41% disagreed, and 9% had no opinion. The same poll also found that 81% of people believed that businesses should not be allowed to refuse to serve gays and lesbians. 16% disagreed, and 3% had no opinion. 78% thought that gay couples can be "just as good parents" as straight couples, while 18% disagreed and 4% had no opinion.

===== 2013 =====
A November/December Public Religion Research Institute poll sponsored by the Ford Foundation found that 53% of all Americans supported same-sex marriage, while 41% were opposed and 6% unsure. The margin of error was 1.1%. The same poll found clear majorities in favor of same-sex marriage in the Northeast (60%), West (58%), and Midwest (51%). Only the South was evenly divided 48% in favor to 48% opposed. Further, nearly 7-in-10 (69%) of those born after 1980 (ages 18–33) favored allowing same-sex couples to marry.

A Bloomberg National Poll conducted by Selzer & Company taken during September 20–23, 2013 found that 55% supported same-sex marriage, while 36% opposed and 9% were unsure.

A September Quinnipiac University poll found that 56% of American adults and 57% of registered voters supported same-sex marriage. Only 36% of both groups were opposed.

A July 10–14 poll by Gallup found support for same-sex marriage at 54%, a record high, and double the support of 27% Gallup first measured when the question was asked in 1996.

A July poll by USA Today found that 55% of Americans supported same-sex marriage, while 40% did not.

A May 9 Washington Post-ABC News poll found that 55% of Americans supported same-sex marriage, while 40% did not.

A March 20–24 CBS News Poll found that 53% of Americans supported same-sex marriage, 39% opposed it, and 8% were undecided. The same poll also found that 33% of Americans who thought same-sex couples should be allowed to legally marry said they once held the opposite view and had changed their opinion.

A March 7–10 Washington Post-ABC News poll found that 58% of Americans supported same-sex marriage, while 36% opposed. The poll indicated that 52% of GOP-leaning independents under 50 years old supported same-sex marriage.

A March Quinnipiac University poll of voters found 47% supported same-sex marriage and 43% were opposed.

===== 2012 =====
A November 26–29 Gallup poll found that 53% of Americans supported same-sex marriage, while 46% did not.

A November 16–19 CBS News poll found that 51% of Americans supported same-sex marriage, while 40% did not.

A November 7–11 ABC News/Washington Post poll found that 51% of respondents supported same-sex marriage, while 47% were opposed.

A June 6 CNN/ORC International poll showed that a majority of Americans supported same-sex marriage being legalized at 54%, while 42% were opposed.

A May 22 NBC News/Wall Street Journal poll showed that 54% of Americans would support a law in their state making same-sex marriage legal, with 40% opposed.

A May 17–20 ABC News/Washington Post poll showed that 53% believed same-sex marriage should be legal, with only 39% opposed, a low point for opposition in any national poll that far. A May 10 USA Today/Gallup Poll, taken one day after Barack Obama became the first sitting president to express support for same-sex marriage, showed 51% of Americans agreed with the President's endorsement, while 45% disagreed. A May 8 Gallup Poll showed majority support for same-sex marriage nationwide, with 50% in favor and 48% opposed. An April Pew Research Center poll showed support for same-sex marriage at 48%, while opposition fell to 44%.

A March 7–10 ABC News/Washington Post poll found 52% of adults thought it should be legal for same-sex couples to get married, while 42% disagreed and 5% were unsure. A March survey by the Public Religion Research Institute found 52% of Americans supported allowing same-sex couples to marry, while 44% opposed. A February 29 – March 3 NBC News/Wall Street Journal poll found 49% of adults supported allowing same-sex couples to marry, while 40% opposed.

===== 2011 =====
Public support for same-sex marriage continued to grow in 2011. In February and March, a Pew Research Center for the People & the Press survey found about as many adults favored (45%) as opposed (46%) allowing same-sex couples to marry legally, compared to a 2009 Pew Research survey that found just 37% backed same-sex marriage while 54% opposed. In March and April, polls by Gallup, ABC News/Washington Post, and CNN/Opinion Research all showed that a majority of Americans approved of same-sex marriage. In March, Pew reported that 57% of Democrats favored legal recognition for same-sex marriage, and 51% of independents agreed, but only 23% of Republicans agreed. An April CNN/Opinion Research Poll showed majority support including 64% of Democrats and 55% of independents, but only 27% of Republicans.

In March 2011, Democracy Corps conducted a survey of 1,000 likely 2012 election voters in 50 congressional districts considered political battlegrounds. It asked respondents to rate their feelings on the same-sex marriage issue on a 0–100 scale, with 100 being "very warm" or favorable feelings, and 0 being "very cold" or unfavorable feelings. 42% were on the "cool" or unfavorable side, and 35% were on the "warm" or favorable side. A May 2011 Gallup Poll also showed majority support for same-sex marriage, 53% in favor to 45% opposed. Gallup measured a 9-point increase in support, from 44% to 53%, indicating that support increased faster than in any previous year.

===== 2010 =====
An August Associated Press/National Constitution Center poll found 52% agreed that the federal government should give legal recognition to marriages between couples of the same sex, an increase from 46% in 2009. 46% disagreed, compared to 53% in 2009. An August CNN/Opinion Research Poll showed that 49% of respondents thought gays and lesbians do have a constitutional right to get married and have their marriage recognized by law as valid, and 52% thought gays and lesbians should have that right. Earlier polls in February and May found opinion divided within the margin of error, but with a consistent trend of increasing support and decreasing opposition compared to prior years. One August poll found majority opposition, and a November exit poll of 17,504 voters by CNN during the 2010 midterm elections found 53% opposition with 41% support.

==== 2000s ====
===== 2009 =====
An April 30 ABC News/Washington Post poll found support for allowing same-sex couples to marry in the United States ahead of opposition for the first time: 49% support, 46% opposition, and 5% with no opinion. In addition, 53% believed that same-sex marriages performed in other states should be legal in their states. 62% of Democrats and 52% of Independents supported same-sex marriage, while 74% of Republicans opposed. An April 22–26 poll by CBS/New York Times found 42% supported marriage for same-sex couples, 25% supported civil unions, and 28% opposed any legal recognition of same-sex couples. 5% of respondents were unsure. In April, Nate Silver noted that the discrepancy in support for same-sex marriage appeared to result from 5-10% of respondents who favored civil unions over same-sex marriage, but given only two choices, would support same-sex marriage. A LifeWay Research poll conducted in August 2009 found that 61% of Americans born between 1980 and 1991 saw nothing wrong with two people of the same gender getting married, while 39% disagreed. The survey was conducted on a demographically representative survey of 1,200 U.S. adults between 18 and 29 years old.

===== 2008 =====
A December poll revealed that 32% supported the concept of civil unions, 31% would offer full marriage rights to same-sex couples, and 30% opposed any legal recognition for gay and lesbian partnerships. In a July 17 poll by the Quinnipiac University Polling Institute, 55 percent opposed same-sex marriage, and 36 percent were in favor. An ABC News poll found that a majority (58%) of Americans remained opposed to same-sex marriages, while a minority (36%) support them. However, on the question of a constitutional amendment, more were opposed than for it. The majority (51%) of Americans said the issue should be left for the states to decide, while 43% would agree with amending the Constitution. A July poll by Quinnipiac University Polling Institute revealed that 32% would allow homosexual partners to legally marry, 33% would permit them to form civil unions, and 29% would grant them no legal recognition.

===== 2006 =====
In May, a Gallup poll found that opposition to same-sex marriage had fallen slightly, as other polls found a sharper dip. In the poll, when asked if marriages between homosexuals should be recognized by law as valid, with the same rights as traditional marriages, 58% (down 1 point from Aug 2005, and 9 points from March 1996) of Americans responded that they should not be recognized. 39% (up 2 points from Aug 2005, and 12 points from 1996) felt same-sex marriages should be recognized by law. If "homosexuals" is replaced with "same-sex couples", 42% backed same-sex marriage while 56% opposed it.

In June, a Princeton Survey Research Associates/Pew Research Center poll found a rise in those opposed to same-sex marriage, with 56% disapproving. In March, a Princeton Survey Research Associates/Pew Research Center poll concluded that 39% of Americans supported same-sex marriage, while 51% opposed it, and 10% were undecided. A Pew study in March found that 51% opposed same-sex marriage, with 39% supporting it, and the level of "strongly opposing" same-sex marriage had fallen from 42% to 28%. Pew's May 2008 Survey found that for the first time, a majority of people did not oppose same-sex marriage at 49%. 20% opposed and 29% strongly opposed same-sex marriage, up 1% from the March 2006 Pew Research Results.

===== 2004 =====
In December, a Princeton Survey Research Associates/Pew Research Center poll found 61% of Americans opposed (including 38% "strongly opposed").

==== 20th century ====
An October 1989 Yankelovich Clancy Shulman telephone poll found that 84% of Americans opposed same-sex marriage, with 12% supporting same-sex marriage, and 4% being not sure.

A 1988 International Social Survey Programme poll found that 80.3% of Americans opposed same-sex marriage, while 11.9% of Americans supported same-sex marriage, and 2.1% of Americans neither agreed or disagreed.

A 1988 National Opinion Research Center / General Social Survey / University of Chicago poll found that 82.6% of Americans opposed same-sex marriage, 10.7% of Americans supported it, 3.9% of Americans neither agreed or disagreed, and 2.8% didn't know / etc.

=== Demographic differences ===
==== By age ====
Date(s) conducted	Age	Support same-sex marriage	Oppose same-sex marriage	Don't Know / Refused	Margin of error	Sample	Conducted by	Polling type
June 8, 2017 – June 18, 2017	18-29	79%	19%	2%		351 adults	Pew Research Center	Landline telephone interviews and cell phone interviews
August 5, 2017 – August 9, 2017	18-34	75%			2.82%	360 adults	NBC News / Wall Street Journal	Live interviews and cell phone interviews
June 8, 2017 – June 18, 2017	18-48	72%	24%	4%		1,016 adults	Pew Research Center	Landline telephone interviews and cell phone interviews
June 8, 2017 – June 18, 2017	30-49	67%	28%	5%		665 adults	Pew Research Center	Landline telephone interviews and cell phone interviews
August 5, 2017 – August 9, 2017	35-49	60%			2.82%	300 adults	NBC News / Wall Street Journal	Live interviews and cell phone interviews
August 5, 2017 – August 9, 2017	50-64	55%			2.82%	336 adults	NBC News / Wall Street Journal	Live interviews and cell phone interviews
June 8, 2017 – June 18, 2017	50-64	56%	38%	6%		778 adults	Pew Research Center	Landline telephone interviews and cell phone interviews
June 8, 2017 – June 18, 2017	50+	52%	41%	7%		1,452 adults	Pew Research Center	Landline telephone interviews and cell phone interviews
August 5, 2017 – August 9, 2017	65+	42%			2.82%	204 adults	NBC News / Wall Street Journal	Live interviews and cell phone interviews
June 8, 2017 – June 18, 2017	65+	46%	45%	9%		674 adults	Pew Research Center	Landline telephone interviews and cell phone interviews

==== By education ====
Date(s) conducted	Education	Support same-sex marriage	Oppose same-sex marriage	Don't Know / Refused	Margin of error	Sample	Conducted by	Polling type
June 8, 2017 – June 18, 2017	College grad	72%	23%	6%		719 adults	Pew Research Center	Landline telephone interviews and cell phone interviews
June 8, 2017 – June 18, 2017	College grad+	75%	21%	5%		1,199 adults	Pew Research Center	Landline telephone interviews and cell phone interviews
August 5, 2017 – August 9, 2017	College graduates	68%			2.82%	468 adults	NBC News / Wall Street Journal	Live interviews and cell phone interviews
August 5, 2017 – August 9, 2017	High school or less	48%			2.82%	372 adults	NBC News / Wall Street Journal	Live interviews and cell phone interviews
June 8, 2017 – June 18, 2017	HS or less	53%	41%	6%		634 adults	Pew Research Center	Landline telephone interviews and cell phone interviews
June 8, 2017 – June 18, 2017	Non-college	57%	37%	6%		1,295 adults	Pew Research Center	Landline telephone interviews and cell phone interviews
June 8, 2017 – June 18, 2017	Postgrad	79%	17%	3%		480 adults	Pew Research Center	Landline telephone interviews and cell phone interviews
August 5, 2017 – August 9, 2017	Postgraduates	72%			2.82%	168 adults	NBC News / Wall Street Journal	Live interviews and cell phone interviews
August 5, 2017 – August 9, 2017	Some college	61%			2.82%	192 adults	NBC News / Wall Street Journal	Live interviews and cell phone interviews
June 8, 2017 – June 18, 2017	Some college	62%	32%	6%		661 adults	Pew Research Center	Landline telephone interviews and cell phone interviews

==== By ethnicity or race ====
Date(s) conducted	Ethnicity or race	Support same-sex marriage	Oppose same-sex marriage	Don't Know / Refused	Margin of error	Sample	Conducted by	Polling type
June 8, 2017 – June 18, 2017	Black, non-Hispanic	51%	41%	7%	7.3%	241 adults	Pew Research Center	Landline telephone interviews and cell phone interviews
August 5, 2017 – August 9, 2017	African-American	51%			2.82%	144 adults	NBC News / Wall Street Journal	Live interviews and cell phone interviews
August 5, 2017 – August 9, 2017	Hispanic	66%			2.82%	840 adults	NBC News / Wall Street Journal	Live interviews and cell phone interviews
June 8, 2017 – June 18, 2017	Hispanic	60%	36%	5%	6.5%	297 adults	Pew Research Center	Landline telephone interviews and cell phone interviews
August 5, 2017 – August 9, 2017	Total Non-White	60%			2.82%	312 adults	NBC News / Wall Street Journal	Live interviews and cell phone interviews
August 5, 2017 – August 9, 2017	White	60%			2.82%	888 adults	NBC News / Wall Street Journal	Live interviews and cell phone interviews
June 8, 2017 – June 18, 2017	White, non-Hispanic	64%	31%	5%	2.7%	1,737 adults	Pew Research Center	Landline telephone interviews and cell phone interviews

==== By gender ====
Date(s) conducted	Gender	Support same-sex marriage	Oppose same-sex marriage	Don't Know / Refused	Margin of error	Sample	Conducted by	Polling type
August 5, 2017 – August 9, 2017	Men	61%			2.82%	576 adults	NBC News / Wall Street Journal	Live interviews and cell phone interviews
June 8, 2017 – June 18, 2017	Men	60%	34%	6%		1,355 adults	Pew Research Center	Landline telephone interviews and cell phone interviews
August 5, 2017 – August 9, 2017	Women	59%			2.82%	624 adults	NBC News / Wall Street Journal	Live interviews and cell phone interviews
June 8, 2017 – June 18, 2017	Women	64%	30%	5%		1,149 adults	Pew Research Center	Landline telephone interviews and cell phone interviews

==== By geography ====
Date(s) conducted	Geography	Support legalized same-sex marriage	Margin of error	Sample	Conducted by	Polling type
August 5, 2017 – August 9, 2017	Rural	47%	2.82%		NBC News / Wall Street Journal	Live interviews and cell phone interviews
August 5, 2017 – August 9, 2017	Suburban	61%	2.82%		NBC News / Wall Street Journal	Live interviews and cell phone interviews
August 5, 2017 – August 9, 2017	Urban	66%	2.82%		NBC News / Wall Street Journal	Live interviews and cell phone interviews

==== By income ====
Date(s) conducted	Income	Support same-sex marriage	Oppose same-sex marriage	Don't Know / Refused	Margin of error	Sample	Conducted by	Polling type
June 8, 2017 – June 18, 2017	<$30,000	54%	39%	7%		568 adults	Pew Research Center	Landline telephone interviews and cell phone interviews
June 8, 2017 – June 18, 2017	$30,000-$74,999	65%	31%	5%		787 adults	Pew Research Center	Landline telephone interviews and cell phone interviews
June 8, 2017 – June 18, 2017	$75,000+	72%	23%	5%		951 adults	Pew Research Center	Landline telephone interviews and cell phone interviews

==== By political affiliation ====
Date(s) conducted	Political affiliation	Support same-sex marriage	Oppose same-sex marriage	Don't Know / Refused	Margin of error	Sample	Conducted by	Polling type
June 8, 2017 – June 18, 2017	Dem/Dem lean	76%	19%	5%	3.2%	1,230 adults	Pew Research Center	Landline telephone interviews and cell phone interviews
June 8, 2017 – June 18, 2017	Democrat	73%	22%	5%		777 adults	Pew Research Center	Landline telephone interviews and cell phone interviews
May 1, 2018 – May 10, 2018	Democrats	83%			4%	1,024 adults	Gallup	Telephone interviews
June 8, 2017 – June 18, 2017	Independent	70%	26%	5%		989 adults	Pew Research Center	Landline telephone interviews and cell phone interviews
May 1, 2018 – May 10, 2018	Independents	71%			4%	1,024 adults	Gallup	Telephone interviews
June 8, 2017 – June 18, 2017	Rep/Rep lean	47%	48%	5%	3.5%	1,050 adults	Pew Research Center	Landline telephone interviews and cell phone interviews
June 8, 2017 – June 18, 2017	Republican	40%	54%	5%		612 adults	Pew Research Center	Landline telephone interviews and cell phone interviews
May 1, 2018 – May 10, 2018	Republicans	44%			4%	1,024 adults	Gallup	Telephone interviews
February 11, 2020 – November 22, 2020	Republicans	51%			1.1%	10,052 adults	PRRI	Interviews

==== By political affiliation by generation ====
Date(s) conducted	Political affiliation by generation	Support same-sex marriage	Oppose same-sex marriage	Don't Know / Refused	Margin of error	Sample	Conducted by	Polling type
June 8, 2017 – June 18, 2017	Democratic Millennials	87%	12%	2%		344 adults	Pew Research Center	Landline telephone interviews and cell phone interviews
June 8, 2017 – June 18, 2017	Democratic Gen Xers	76%	18%	5%		268 adults	Pew Research Center	Landline telephone interviews and cell phone interviews
June 8, 2017 – June 18, 2017	Democratic Baby Boomers	70%	26%	4%		463 adults	Pew Research Center	Landline telephone interviews and cell phone interviews
June 8, 2017 – June 18, 2017	Democratic Silents	56%	31%	13%		140 adults	Pew Research Center	Landline telephone interviews and cell phone interviews
June 8, 2017 – June 18, 2017	Republican Millennials	60%	38%	2%		198 adults	Pew Research Center	Landline telephone interviews and cell phone interviews
June 8, 2017 – June 18, 2017	Republican Gen Xers	51%	43%	6%		215 adults	Pew Research Center	Landline telephone interviews and cell phone interviews
June 8, 2017 – June 18, 2017	Republican Baby Boomers	42%	53%	6%		421 adults	Pew Research Center	Landline telephone interviews and cell phone interviews
June 8, 2017 – June 18, 2017	Republican Silents	29%	62%	9%		188 adults	Pew Research Center	Landline telephone interviews and cell phone interviews

==== By political affiliation by ideology ====
Date(s) conducted	Political affiliation by ideology	Support same-sex marriage	Oppose same-sex marriage	Don't Know / Refused	Margin of error	Sample	Conducted by	Polling type
June 8, 2017 – June 18, 2017	Conservative Rep/Lean Rep	39%	55%	6%		698 adults	Pew Research Center	Landline telephone interviews and cell phone interviews
June 8, 2017 – June 18, 2017	Liberal Dem/Lean Dem	66%	27%	7%		617 adults	Pew Research Center	Landline telephone interviews and cell phone interviews
June 8, 2017 – June 18, 2017	Moderate/Cons Dem/Lean Dem	88%	10%	2%		613 adults	Pew Research Center	Landline telephone interviews and cell phone interviews
June 8, 2017 – June 18, 2017	Moderate/Lib Rep/Lean Rep	63%	33%	4%		352 adults	Pew Research Center	Landline telephone interviews and cell phone interviews

==== By religious affiliation ====
Date(s) conducted	Religious affiliation	Support same-sex marriage	Oppose same-sex marriage	Don't Know / Refused	Margin of error	Sample	Conducted by	Polling type
May 3, 2017 – May 7, 2017	Catholics	65%			4%		Gallup	Telephone interviews
May 3, 2017 – May 7, 2017	Protestants/Christians (nonspecific)	55%			4%		Gallup	Telephone interviews
June 8, 2017 – June 18, 2017	Total Catholic	67%	28%	6%		502 adults	Pew Research Center	Landline telephone interviews and cell phone interviews
June 8, 2017 – June 18, 2017	Total Protestant	48%	46%	6%		1,165 adults	Pew Research Center	Landline telephone interviews and cell phone interviews
June 8, 2017 – June 18, 2017	Total Unaffiliated	85%	10%	4%		597 adults	Pew Research Center	Landline telephone interviews and cell phone interviews
September 9 – 22, 2020	Hispanic Catholics	78%					Public Religion Research Institute	Online (2,496), some telephone (42)
September 9 – 22, 2020	White Catholics	67%					Public Religion Research Institute	Online (2,496), some telephone (42)
September 9 – 22, 2020	White mainline Protestants	79%					Public Religion Research Institute	Online (2,496), some telephone (42)
September 9 – 22, 2020	Hispanic Protestants	68%					Public Religion Research Institute	Online (2,496), some telephone (42)
September 9 – 22, 2020	Black Protestants	57%					Public Religion Research Institute	Online (2,496), some telephone (42)
September 9 – 22, 2020	White evangelical Protestants	34%					Public Religion Research Institute	Online (2,496), some telephone (42)
September 9 – 22, 2020	Non-Christian religious	72%					Public Religion Research Institute	Online (2,496), some telephone (42)
September 9 – 22, 2020	Christian: Other	56%					Public Religion Research Institute	Online (2,496), some telephone (42)
September 9 – 22, 2020	Unaffiliated	90%					Public Religion Research Institute	Online (2,496), some telephone (42)

==== By religious attendance ====
Date(s) conducted	Religious attendance	Support same-sex marriage	Oppose same-sex marriage	Don't Know / Refused	Margin of error	Sample	Conducted by	Polling type
June 8, 2017 – June 18, 2017	Less than weekly	75%	20%	5%		1,619 adults	Pew Research Center	Landline telephone interviews and cell phone interviews
August 5, 2017 – August 9, 2017	Monthly	59%			2.82%	204 adults	NBC News / Wall Street Journal	Live interviews and cell phone interviews
August 5, 2017 – August 9, 2017	Never	80%			2.82%	288 adults	NBC News / Wall Street Journal	Live interviews and cell phone interviews
August 5, 2017 – August 9, 2017	Weekly	34%			2.82%	384 adults	NBC News / Wall Street Journal	Live interviews and cell phone interviews
June 8, 2017 – June 18, 2017	Weekly or more	34%	66%	6%		863 adults	Pew Research Center	Landline telephone interviews and cell phone interviews
August 5, 2017 – August 9, 2017	Yearly	70%			2.82%	312 adults	NBC News / Wall Street Journal	Live interviews and cell phone interviews

== Regional, state, and local level polls ==
=== By state, federal district, or territory ===
Date(s) conducted	State, federal district, or territory	Support same-sex marriage	Oppose same-sex marriage	Don't Know / Refused	Sample	Conducted by	Polling type
February 28 – December 8, 2025	Alabama	54%	39%	7%	267 adults	Public Religion Research Institute	Online interviews
February 28 – December 8, 2025	Alaska	71%	27%	2%	161 adults	Public Religion Research Institute	Online interviews
February 28 – December 8, 2025	Arizona	63%	30%	6%	483 adults	Public Religion Research Institute	Online interviews
February 28 – December 8, 2025	Arkansas	50%	46%	4%	167 adults	Public Religion Research Institute	Online interviews
February 28 – December 8, 2025	California	68%	28%	3%	2,098 adults	Public Religion Research Institute	Online interviews
February 28 – December 8, 2025	Colorado	70%	28%	2%	330 adults	Public Religion Research Institute	Online interviews
February 28 – December 8, 2025	Connecticut	69%	28%	4%	280 adults	Public Religion Research Institute	Online interviews
February 28 – December 8, 2025	Delaware	60%	35%	4%	167 adults	Public Religion Research Institute	Online interviews
February 28 – December 8, 2025	Florida	64%	32%	3%	1,385 adults	Public Religion Research Institute	Online interviews
February 28 – December 8, 2025	Georgia	54%	40%	6%	573 adults	Public Religion Research Institute	Online interviews
February 28 – December 8, 2025	Hawaii	68%	29%	3%	156 adults	Public Religion Research Institute	Online interviews
February 28 – December 8, 2025	Idaho	62%	36%	2%	174 adults	Public Religion Research Institute	Online interviews
February 28 – December 8, 2025	Illinois	72%	24%	4%	704 adults	Public Religion Research Institute	Online interviews
February 28 – December 8, 2025	Indiana	62%	35%	3%	443 adults	Public Religion Research Institute	Online interviews
February 28 – December 8, 2025	Iowa	58%	37%	4%	231 adults	Public Religion Research Institute	Online interviews
February 28 – December 8, 2025	Kansas	65%	34%	1%	188 adults	Public Religion Research Institute	Online interviews
February 28 – December 8, 2025	Kentucky	62%	35%	3%	315 adults	Public Religion Research Institute	Online interviews
February 28 – December 8, 2025	Louisiana	53%	44%	4%	238 adults	Public Religion Research Institute	Online interviews
February 28 – December 8, 2025	Maine	74%	25%	2%	170 adults	Public Religion Research Institute	Online interviews
February 28 – December 8, 2025	Maryland	64%	35%	1%	388 adults	Public Religion Research Institute	Online interviews
February 28 – December 8, 2025	Massachusetts	85%	14%	1%	383 adults	Public Religion Research Institute	Online interviews
February 28 – December 8, 2025	Michigan	68%	29%	2%	696 adults	Public Religion Research Institute	Online interviews
February 28 – December 8, 2025	Minnesota	74%	21%	4%	555 adults	Public Religion Research Institute	Online interviews
February 28 – December 8, 2025	Mississippi	47%	49%	4%	186 adults	Public Religion Research Institute	Online interviews
February 28 – December 8, 2025	Missouri	57%	39%	3%	351 adults	Public Religion Research Institute	Online interviews
February 28 – December 8, 2025	Montana	66%	33%	1%	173 adults	Public Religion Research Institute	Online interviews
February 28 – December 8, 2025	Nebraska	67%	32%	1%	171 adults	Public Religion Research Institute	Online interviews
February 28 – December 8, 2025	Nevada	70%	26%	4%	189 adults	Public Religion Research Institute	Online interviews
February 28 – December 8, 2025	New Hampshire	69%	29%	1%	165 adults	Public Religion Research Institute	Online interviews
February 28 – December 8, 2025	New Jersey	72%	26%	1%	528 adults	Public Religion Research Institute	Online interviews
February 28 – December 8, 2025	New Mexico	69%	31%	1%	158 adults	Public Religion Research Institute	Online interviews
February 28 – December 8, 2025	New York	70%	26%	4%	1,071 adults	Public Religion Research Institute	Online interviews
February 28 – December 8, 2025	North Carolina	60%	36%	3%	655 adults	Public Religion Research Institute	Online interviews
February 28 – December 8, 2025	North Dakota	67%	34%	0%	158 adults	Public Religion Research Institute	Online interviews
February 28 – December 8, 2025	Ohio	65%	32%	3%	877 adults	Public Religion Research Institute	Online interviews
February 28 – December 8, 2025	Oklahoma	53%	44%	3%	211 adults	Public Religion Research Institute	Online interviews
February 28 – December 8, 2025	Oregon	69%	29%	2%	564 adults	Public Religion Research Institute	Online interviews
February 28 – December 8, 2025	Pennsylvania	64%	33%	3%	1,037 adults	Public Religion Research Institute	Online interviews
February 28 – December 8, 2025	Rhode Island	85%	14%	1%	152 adults	Public Religion Research Institute	Online interviews
February 28 – December 8, 2025	South Carolina	56%	41%	3%	320 adults	Public Religion Research Institute	Online interviews
February 28 – December 8, 2025	South Dakota	55%	44%	1%	160 adults	Public Religion Research Institute	Online interviews
February 28 – December 8, 2025	Tennessee	55%	42%	4%	402 adults	Public Religion Research Institute	Online interviews
February 28 – December 8, 2025	Texas	59%	38%	4%	1,626 adults	Public Religion Research Institute	Online interviews
February 28 – December 8, 2025	Utah	60%	37%	4%	213 adults	Public Religion Research Institute	Online interviews
February 28 – December 8, 2025	Vermont	81%	19%	0%	160 adults	Public Religion Research Institute	Online interviews
February 28 – December 8, 2025	Virginia	68%	28%	4%	581 adults	Public Religion Research Institute	Online interviews
February 28 – December 8, 2025	Washington	78%	19%	3%	504 adults	Public Religion Research Institute	Online interviews
February 28 – December 8, 2025	West Virginia	52%	44%	4%	174 adults	Public Religion Research Institute	Online interviews
February 28 – December 8, 2025	Wisconsin	70%	28%	3%	456 adults	Public Religion Research Institute	Online interviews
February 28 – December 8, 2025	Wyoming	58%	39%	2%	157 adults	Public Religion Research Institute	Online interviews
February 28 – December 8, 2025	District of Columbia	71%	28%	0%	160 adults	Public Religion Research Institute	Online interviews

=== By metro area ===
Date(s) conducted	Metro area	Support same-sex marriage	Oppose same-sex marriage	Don't Know / Refused	Sample	Conducted by	Polling type
February 28 – December 8, 2025	Atlanta	60%	36%	5%	322 adults	Public Religion Research Institute	Online interviews
February 28 – December 8, 2025	Austin	75%	24%	1%	125 adults	Public Religion Research Institute	Online interviews
February 28 – December 8, 2025	Baltimore	65%	34%	1%	187 adults	Public Religion Research Institute	Online interviews
February 28 – December 8, 2025	Boston	87%	12%	1%	265 adults	Public Religion Research Institute	Online interviews
February 28 – December 8, 2025	Charlotte	69%	30%	1%	158 adults	Public Religion Research Institute	Online interviews
February 28 – December 8, 2025	Chicago	72%	24%	4%	503 adults	Public Religion Research Institute	Online interviews
February 28 – December 8, 2025	Cincinnati	60%	34%	7%	168 adults	Public Religion Research Institute	Online interviews
February 28 – December 8, 2025	Cleveland	73%	25%	2%	157 adults	Public Religion Research Institute	Online interviews
February 28 – December 8, 2025	Columbus	73%	24%	3%	141 adults	Public Religion Research Institute	Online interviews
February 28 – December 8, 2025	Dallas	60%	36%	5%	411 adults	Public Religion Research Institute	Online interviews
February 28 – December 8, 2025	Denver	75%	22%	3%	173 adults	Public Religion Research Institute	Online interviews
February 28 – December 8, 2025	Detroit	65%	32%	3%	316 adults	Public Religion Research Institute	Online interviews
February 28 – December 8, 2025	Houston	54%	40%	5%	375 adults	Public Religion Research Institute	Online interviews
February 28 – December 8, 2025	Indianapolis	64%	35%	1%	150 adults	Public Religion Research Institute	Online interviews
February 28 – December 8, 2025	Kansas City	68%	30%	2%	132 adults	Public Religion Research Institute	Online interviews
February 28 – December 8, 2025	Las Vegas	64%	32%	5%	144 adults	Public Religion Research Institute	Online interviews
February 28 – December 8, 2025	Los Angeles	68%	27%	6%	645 adults	Public Religion Research Institute	Online interviews
February 28 – December 8, 2025	Miami	69%	28%	3%	333 adults	Public Religion Research Institute	Online interviews
February 28 – December 8, 2025	Milwaukee	65%	31%	4%	150 adults	Public Religion Research Institute	Online interviews
February 28 – December 8, 2025	Minneapolis-St. Paul	79%	18%	3%	379 adults	Public Religion Research Institute	Online interviews
February 28 – December 8, 2025	Nashville	61%	32%	6%	119 adults	Public Religion Research Institute	Online interviews
February 28 – December 8, 2025	New York City	71%	26%	3%	974 adults	Public Religion Research Institute	Online interviews
February 28 – December 8, 2025	Orlando	57%	36%	7%	171 adults	Public Religion Research Institute	Online interviews
February 28 – December 8, 2025	Philadelphia	67%	27%	6%	369 adults	Public Religion Research Institute	Online interviews
February 28 – December 8, 2025	Phoenix	67%	27%	6%	317 adults	Public Religion Research Institute	Online interviews
February 28 – December 8, 2025	Pittsburgh	66%	28%	6%	197 adults	Public Religion Research Institute	Online interviews
February 28 – December 8, 2025	Portland	75%	21%	5%	223 adults	Public Religion Research Institute	Online interviews
February 28 – December 8, 2025	Riverside	60%	37%	3%	236 adults	Public Religion Research Institute	Online interviews
February 28 – December 8, 2025	Sacramento	75%	24%	2%	135 adults	Public Religion Research Institute	Online interviews
February 28 – December 8, 2025	San Antonio	62%	34%	4%	167 adults	Public Religion Research Institute	Online interviews
February 28 – December 8, 2025	San Diego	70%	30%	0%	145 adults	Public Religion Research Institute	Online interviews
February 28 – December 8, 2025	San Francisco	79%	21%	1%	253 adults	Public Religion Research Institute	Online interviews
February 28 – December 8, 2025	San Jose	75%	24%	2%	130 adults	Public Religion Research Institute	Online interviews
February 28 – December 8, 2025	Seattle	81%	17%	2%	233 adults	Public Religion Research Institute	Online interviews
February 28 – December 8, 2025	St. Louis	66%	30%	4%	169 adults	Public Religion Research Institute	Online interviews
February 28 – December 8, 2025	Tampa-St. Petersburg	67%	31%	1%	213 adults	Public Religion Research Institute	Online interviews
February 28 – December 8, 2025	Virginia Beach	66%	33%	1%	112 adults	Public Religion Research Institute	Online interviews
February 28 – December 8, 2025	Washington D.C.	69%	29%	2%	441 adults	Public Religion Research Institute	Online interviews

=== By region ===
Date(s) conducted	Region	Support same-sex marriage	Oppose same-sex marriage	Don't Know / Refused / No answer	Margin of error	Sample	Conducted by	Polling type
February 28 – December 8, 2025	Midwest	66%	31%	3%		4,990 adults	Public Religion Research Institute	Online interviews
August 5, 2017 – August 9, 2017	Midwest	53%			2.82%		NBC News / Wall Street Journal	Live interviews and cell phone interviews
June 8, 2017 – June 18, 2017	Midwest	62%	33%	6%		552 adults	Pew Research Center	Landline telephone interviews and cell phone interviews
February 28 – December 8, 2025	Northeast	72%	26%	3%		3,946 adults	Public Religion Research Institute	Online interviews
August 5, 2017 – August 9, 2017	Northeast	70%			2.82%		NBC News / Wall Street Journal	Live interviews and cell phone interviews
June 8, 2017 – June 18, 2017	Northeast	73%	23%	4%		432 adults	Pew Research Center	Landline telephone interviews and cell phone interviews
February 28 – December 8, 2025	South	59%	37%	4%		7,815 adults	Public Religion Research Institute	Online interviews
March 12, 2018 – March 25, 2018	South	55%	42%	3%	2.4%	4,132 adult residents	NBC News / SurveyMonkey (Note: Alabama, Arkansas, Florida, Georgia, Louisiana, Mississippi, North Carolina, South Carolina, Tennessee, Texas, and Virginia)	Online survey
February 28 – December 8, 2025	West	69%	29%	3%		5,360 adults	Public Religion Research Institute	Online interviews
August 5, 2017 – August 9, 2017	West	67%			2.82%		NBC News / Wall Street Journal	Live interviews and cell phone interviews
June 8, 2017 – June 18, 2017	West	68%	28%	4%		577 adults	Pew Research Center	Landline telephone interviews and cell phone interviews

== See also ==
- Public opinion of interracial marriage in the United States
- LGBT rights in the United States
- Societal attitudes toward homosexuality § United States
- Equality Act (United States) § Public opinion
- Southern Baptist Convention
