= Public opinion of interracial marriage in the United States =

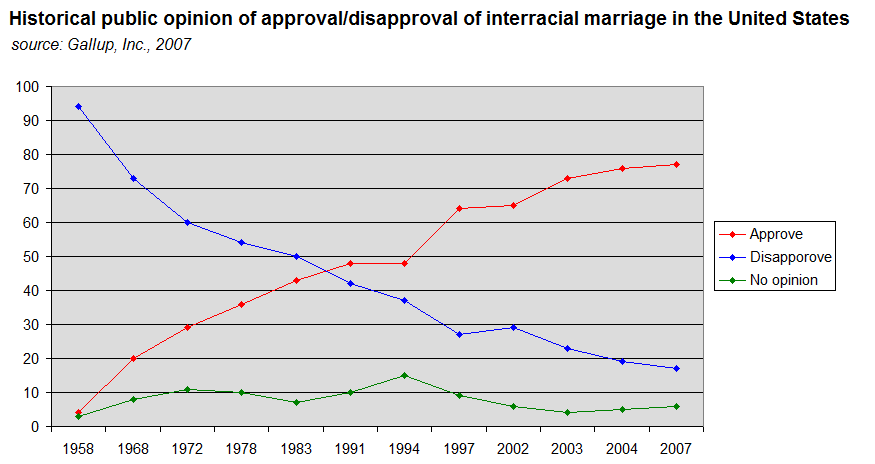
Historical data according to Gallup, Inc.

Public opinion of interracial marriage in the United States has changed substantially since the 1950s. Today, support for interracial marriage is near-universal.

Opposition to interracial marriage was frequently based on religious principles. The overwhelming majority of white Southern evangelical Christians saw racial segregation, including on matters of marriage, as something that was divinely instituted from God. They held that legal recognition of interracial couples would violate biblical teaching and hence their religious liberty. This position was held by prominent evangelical denominations such as the Southern Baptist Convention until the late-20th century.

A 2011 poll found that 46% of Mississippi Republicans polled said they think interracial marriage should be illegal. A further 14% were not sure.

A 2018 YouGov/Economist poll found that 17% of Americans oppose interracial marriage; with 19% of "other" ethnic groups, 18% of blacks, 17% of whites, and 15% of Hispanics opposing. 28% of Republicans and 12% of Democrats opposed interracial marriage.

== Polling ==
=== Gallup ===
Date	Approval	Disapproval	No Opinion
July 6-21, 2021	94	4	2
June 13-July 5, 2013	87	11	2
August 4-7, 2011	86	11	3
September 7-8, 2007	79	15	6
June 4-24, 2007	77	17	6
June 9-30, 2004	76	19	5
November 11-December 14, 2003	73	23	4
June 3-9, 2002	65	29	6
January 4-February 28, 1997	64	27	9
September 18-20, 1994	48	37	15
June 13-16, 1991	48	42	10
April 29-May 2, 1983	43	50	7
July 21-24, 1978	36	54	10
October 13-16, 1972	29	60	11
June 26-July 1, 1968	20	73	8
September 24-29, 1958	4	94	3

== See also ==
- Public opinion of same-sex marriage in the United States
