= Same-sex marriage law in the United States by territory =

List of U.S. state and territorial statutes and codes, along with the Code of the District of Columbia, recognizing or prohibiting same-sex marriage, civil unions and domestic partnerships Statute recognizes same-sex marriage, civil unions and/or domestic partnerships Statute recognizes same-sex marriage and domestic partnerships Statute recognizes same-sex marriage Statute neither recognizes or prohibits same-sex marriage, civil unions and domestic partnerships Statute prohibits same-sex marriage (not enforceable) Statute prohibits same-sex marriage, civil unions and domestic partnerships (not enforceable)

U.S. state constitutional amendments regarding same-sex unions Constitution explicitly protects same-sex marriage Constitution implicitly protects same-sex marriage through state court ruling or general sexual orientation nondiscrimination clause No state constitutional amendment banning legal recognition of same-sex unions Constitutional amendment banned same-sex marriage Constitutional amendment banned same-sex marriage and civil unions Constitutional amendment banned same-sex marriage, civil unions, and any marriage-like contract between unmarried persons

This article summarizes the same-sex marriage laws of states in the United States. Via the case Obergefell v. Hodges on June 26, 2015, the Supreme Court of the United States legalized same-sex marriage in a decision that applies nationwide, with the possible exception of American Samoa and some Tribal Nations. Same-sex marriages are currently licensed and recognized in all U.S. states, the District of Columbia, and all U.S. territories excepting the aforementioned American Samoa, but not in some Native American tribal nations.

== Federal districts ==
=== District of Columbia ===
Ban declared unconstitutional?	Legalized by district?
—N/a	Yes

- District of Columbia Code – Title 46 Domestic Relations.

§ 46-401 Equal access to marriage.
(a) Marriage is the legally recognized union of 2 persons. Any person may enter into a marriage in the District of Columbia with another person, regardless of gender, unless the marriage is expressly prohibited by § 46- 401.01 or § 46-403.

(b) Where necessary to implement the rights and responsibilities relating to the marital relationship or familial relationships, gender-specific terms shall be construed to be gender neutral for all purposes throughout the law, whether in the context of statute, administrative or court rule, policy, common law, or any other source of civil law.

== Unincorporated territories ==
=== American Samoa ===
Ban declared unconstitutional?	Legalized by state?
No	No

=== Guam ===
Ban declared unconstitutional?	Legalized by state?
Yes	Yes

- Guam Code – Title 19 Personal Relations.

Chapter 3: The contract of marriage
Marriage means the legal union between two persons without regard to gender.

=== Puerto Rico ===
Ban declared unconstitutional?	Legalized by state?
Yes	No

Texts:

- Puerto Rico Civil Code – Title 31 Civil Code – Subtitle 1 Persons – Part III Marriage – Chapter 29 Nature of Marriage

§ 221. Definition, validity, and dissolution of marriage. Marriage is a civil institution, originating in a civil contract whereby a man and a woman mutually agree to become husband and wife and to discharge toward each other the duties imposed by law. It is valid only when contracted and solemnized in accordance with the provisions of law, and it may be dissolved before the death of either spouse only in the cases expressly provided for in this title. Any marriage between persons of the same sex or transsexuals contracted in other jurisdictions shall not be valid or given juridical recognition in Puerto Rico.

=== Northern Mariana Islands ===
Ban declared unconstitutional?	Legalized by state?
Yes	Yes

=== U.S. Virgin Islands ===
Ban declared unconstitutional?	Legalized by state?
Yes	No

Texts:

- Virgin Islands Code – Title 16 V.I.C. (2013) Marriage

§ 31. Nature of marriage. Marriage is hereby declared to be a civil contract which may be entered into between a male and a female in accordance with law.
