= Abiding Truth Ministries =

Anti-LGBT organization in Springfield, Massachusetts, US

- Abiding Truth Ministries Logo
- Founded: August 28, 1997
- Founder: Scott Lively
- Type: Public charity 501(c)(3)
- Tax ID no.: 33-0774765 (EIN))
- Registration no.: 001031098
- Location(s): 60 Sherman Street; Springfield, Massachusetts 01109
- Key people: Scott Lively, President
- Revenue: $88,389 (2010)
- Website: http://defendthefamily.com Archived at the Wayback Machine

Abiding Truth Ministries (ATM) is a United States 501(c)(3) non-profit organization founded by Scott Lively in Temecula, California in 1997. The ministry has been based in Springfield, Massachusetts, since 2008. Lively, an American author, attorney and activist, is noted for his opposition to LGBT rights and his involvement in the ex-gay movement. Lively has called for the criminalization of "the public advocacy of homosexuality" as far back as 2007. Along with Kevin E. Abrams, Lively co-authored the 1995 book The Pink Swastika, which states in the preface that "homosexuals [are] the true inventors of Nazism and the guiding force behind many Nazi atrocities." He was also linked to proposed anti-gay legislation in Uganda, which would, if passed, make homosexual conduct punishable by a lengthy prison sentence or death. The Southern Poverty Law Center regards Abiding Truth Ministries as a hate group.

== History ==
Abiding Truth Ministries was founded by Scott Lively, an American author, attorney and activist, noted for his opposition to LGBT rights and his involvement in the ex-gay movement. Lively has called for the criminalization of "the public advocacy of homosexuality" as far back as 2007. He is also directly linked to pending anti-gay legislation in Uganda, which would, if passed, make homosexual conduct and allyship punishable by life in prison or death.

ATM has contributed to organizations including NARTH, American Family Association, Americans for Truth about Homosexuality, Parents' Rights Coalition, Family Research Institute a small group called The Foundation for In-The-Closet Americans and Mission: America. Lively is the former state director for the California branch of the American Family Association

Along with Kevin E. Abrams, he co-authored the book The Pink Swastika, which states in the preface that "homosexuals [are] the true inventors of Nazism and the guiding force behind many Nazi atrocities." In fact, under Nazi Germany, gays and lesbians were sent to concentration camps and several historians have questioned the book's claims and selective use of research. Lively is the former state director for the California branch of the American Family Association and formed Watchmen on the Walls based in Riga, Latvia. According to a January 2011 profile, Lively "has not changed his view that gays are 'agents of America’s moral decline' but has refocused his approach to fit his flock in Springfield, Massachusetts" and "is toning down his antigay rhetoric and shifting his focus to helping the downtrodden."

In 2012, ATM was sued by Sexual Minorities Uganda (SMUG) alleging that the organization's involvement in writing anti-gay legislation amounted to persecution. The lawsuit was ultimately dismissed in 2017 on jurisdictional grounds.

== Positions and issues ==
ATM promotes its message via its Defend the Family website. The website's mission statement is to "promote and defend the Biblical view of marriage and family through... education, training, and funding." The "Resources" section sells books by Lively.

ATM has influenced the upsurge in "politicized homophobia" in Uganda. In March 2009, Lively spoke on the ATM's behalf at the Seminar on Exposing the Truth behind Homosexuality and the Homosexual Agenda in Kampala. He suggested to the audience that the "powerful gay movement" would soon invade Africa and that the "'gay agenda' unleashes epidemics of divorce, child abuse, and HIV/AIDS wherever it gains a foothold". He added "you can't stop someone from molesting children or stop them from having sex with animals." He implied that the Rwandan genocide was caused by homosexuals.

== See also ==
- Family Equality Council
- List of organizations designated by the Southern Poverty Law Center as anti-gay hate groups
- MassEquality
- MassResistance
