= List of organizations designated by the Southern Poverty Law Center as anti-LGBTQ hate groups =

The following is a list of notable U.S.-based organizations classified by the Southern Poverty Law Center (SPLC), an American civil rights organization, as anti-LGBTQ hate groups. The SPLC defines hate groups as those that "... have beliefs or practices that attack or malign an entire class of people, typically for their immutable characteristics." The SPLC states that hate group activities may include speeches, marches, rallies, meetings, publishing, leafleting, and criminal acts such as violence.

The SPLC classifies organizations that propagate "known falsehoods—claims about LGBTQ people that have been thoroughly discredited by scientific authorities—and repeated, groundless name-calling" as anti-LGBTQ hate groups. The SPLC states that "viewing homosexuality as unbiblical does not qualify organizations to be listed as hate groups." SPLC President J. Richard Cohen clarified "[B]y 'known falsehoods,' we mean such things as asserting that gays and lesbians are more disposed to molesting children than heterosexuals—which the overwhelming weight of credible scientific research has determined is patently untrue. Nowhere in our report do we equate taking a position against same-sex marriage with hate speech."

== Types of hate groups ==
The SPLC reported that 926 hate groups were active in the United States in 2008, up from 888 in 2007. These included:

- 186 separate Ku Klux Klan (KKK) groups (race hate)
- 196 neo-Nazi groups
- 111 white nationalist groups
- 98 white power skinhead groups
- 39 Christian Identity groups
- 93 neo-Confederate groups
- 113 black separatist groups
- 159 patriot movement groups
- 90 general hate groups subdivided into anti-LGBTQ, anti-Muslim, anti-immigrant, Holocaust denial, white power music, radical traditionalist Catholic groups, and other groups espousing a variety of hateful doctrines.

=== Tracking of hate groups: commendation and criticism ===
The Southern Poverty Law Center has provided the FBI with information on hate groups. Since 1981, the SPLC has published a quarterly Intelligence Report that provides updates on its monitoring of what it describes as radical right hate groups and extremists in the United States, providing information on the organizational efforts and tactics of these groups. It has been cited by scholars as a reliable source on right-wing extremism and hate groups. The SPLC also publishes a newsletter, the HateWatch Weekly, and maintains a blog, HateWatch, which monitor the extreme right. Rory McVeigh, Chair of the University of Notre Dame Sociology Department, described the SPLC as "an excellent source of information for social scientists who study hate groups."

The SPLC's data on hate groups was questioned by journalist Ken Silverstein who argues that the organization sometimes exaggerates the threats posed by certain groups. In the wake of an August 2012 shooting at the headquarters of the Family Research Council, Washington Post columnist Dana Milbank criticized the SPLC's listing of the Family Research Council as an anti-gay hate group while others, including Americablog's former editor John Aravosis, defended the categorization.

=== History of the LGBTQ list ===
In November 2010, thirteen groups were added: American Family Association, Family Research Council, Illinois Family Institute, Americans for Truth about Homosexuality, Heterosexuals Organized for a Moral Environment, Family Research Institute, Abiding Truth Ministries, American Vision, Chalcedon Foundation, Dove World Outreach Center, Faithful Word Baptist Church, Traditional Values Coalition, and MassResistance. With these new groups SPLC stated that homosexuals remain the minority most targeted by hate crimes.

In March 2012, the SPLC added eleven groups to the listing: United Families International, SaveCalifornia.com, Sons of Thundr (a.k.a. Faith Baptist Church), You Can Run But You Cannot Hide International, Parents Action League, Jewish Political Action Committee, Mission: America, Windsor Hills Baptist Church, True Light Pentecost Church, Tom Brown Ministries, and Public Advocate of the United States.

In early 2014, the SPLC added seven groups: World Congress of Families/Howard Center For Family, Religion and Society, based in Rockford, Illinois, the Catholic Family and Human Rights institute (C-FAM), the Ruth Institute, the Pray in Jesus Name Project, Pacific Justice Institute, Mission: America and the Liberty Counsel.

In 2024, the SPLC added two anti-transgender organizations to the list: Genspect and Society for Evidence-Based Gender Medicine (SEGM).

== Notable groups listed ==
Anti-LGBT, against lesbian, gay, bisexual, transgender, and queer/questioning (LGBTQ) people, or anti-gay can refer to activities in certain categories (or combination of categories): attitudes against or discrimination against LGBTQ people, violence against LGBT people, LGBTQ rights opposition and religious opposition to LGBTQ people. In its Winter 2010 Intelligence Report the SPLC noted that for thirty years going back to Anita Bryant's Christian fundamentalists Save Our Children campaign, the first organized opposition to the gay rights movement defeating an ordinance banning discrimination in areas of housing, employment, and public accommodation based on sexual orientation, "hard-line elements of the religious right have been searching for ways to demonize gay people—or, at a minimum, to find arguments that will prevent their normalization in society." These groups use anti-gay myths to "form the basis of its claim that homosexuality is a social evil that must be suppressed—an opinion rejected by virtually all relevant medical and scientific authorities." The SPLC notes these anti-gay myths "almost certainly contribute to hate crime violence directed at the LGBT community, which is more targeted for such attacks than any other minority group in America."

=== Abiding Truth Ministries ===
Abiding Truth Ministries is a conservative Christian organization located in Temecula, California. Their president, Scott Lively, is an American author, attorney and activist, noted for his opposition to LGBT rights and his involvement in the ex-gay movement. Lively has called for the criminalization of "the public advocacy of homosexuality" as far back as 2007. He is also directly linked to pending anti-gay legislation in Uganda, which would, if passed, make homosexual conduct punishable by a lengthy prison sentence or death.

Along with Kevin E. Abrams, he co-authored the book The Pink Swastika, which states in the preface that "homosexuals [are] the true inventors of Nazism and the guiding force behind many Nazi atrocities." In fact, under Nazi Germany, gays and lesbians were sent to concentration camps and several historians have questioned the book's claims and selective use of research. Lively is the former state director for the California branch of the American Family Association and formed Watchmen on the Walls based in Riga, Latvia. According to a January 2011 profile, Lively "has not changed his view that gays are 'agents of America's moral decline' but has refocused his approach to fit his flock in Springfield, Massachusetts" and "is toning down his antigay rhetoric and shifting his focus to helping the downtrodden."

The SPLC regards Abiding Truth Ministries as a hate group. Lively has responded with his blog.

=== Alamo Christian Foundation ===
The Alamo Christian Foundation was a cult founded by Tony Alamo and one of his wives, Susan Alamo in 1969 in Hollywood, California and later relocated to Dyer, Arkansas. The cult was plagued with legal troubles stemming from allegations of member abuse and tax troubles with the IRS. The cult dissolved when Tony Alamo was arrested and convicted on ten counts of child sexual abuse in 2009.

=== Alliance Defending Freedom ===
In 2013, the SPLC described the Alliance Defending Freedom (ADF) as a "virulently anti-gay" organization. According to the SPLC, the ADF advocates in favor of the criminalization of homosexuality, opposes equal rights for LGBT people, including marriage equality, and makes false claims about the lives of LGBT people. In 2003, the ADF filed an unsuccessful amicus brief in Lawrence v. Texas asking the Supreme Court to uphold Texas' criminal prohibition of sodomy. It has also published documents intended for school distribution stating that "there are moral, social, and medical reasons why homosexual behavior should not be affirmed," and citing medical studies and crime statistics indicating that homosexuals frequently engage in promiscuous behavior, and have a high rate of violent crime and mental illness. Conservative columnist and professor Mike Adams criticized the SPLC for the designation because "Their reason for the characterization was simply that the ADF opposes efforts of the LGBT community to impose its agenda on those who disagree with them for religious reasons." ADF has responded to some media use of SPLC's "hate group" designation against them as defamatory and a discredit to the media profession.

=== American Family Association ===
The American Family Association (AFA) is a United States non-profit organization that promotes conservative fundamentalist Christian values. They oppose same-sex marriage, pornography, and abortion. It was founded in 1977 by Donald Wildmon as the National Federation for Decency and is headquartered in Tupelo, Mississippi.

The AFA defined itself as "a Christian organization promoting the Biblical ethic of decency in American society with primary emphasis on television and other media," later switching their stated emphasis to "moral issues that impact the family". It engages in activism efforts, including buycotts, action alert emails, publications on the AFA's web sites or in the AFA Journal, broadcasts on American Family Radio, and lobbying. The organization has an annual budget of US$14 million and owns 180 American Family Radio stations in 28 states.

As of November 2010, AFA has been listed as a hate group by the SPLC for the "propagation of known falsehoods" and the use of "demonizing propaganda" against LGBT people. AFA countered with the claim that the SPLC is not a reliable source.

=== American Vision ===
American Vision is a United States nonprofit organization founded in 1978 by Steve Schiffman. It operates as a Christian ministry, and calls for "equipping and empowering Christians to restore America's biblical foundation." Gary DeMar has been the organization's president since 1984. Their website promotes Christian Reconstructionism and Postmillennialism, and opposes dispensationalism.

The Southern Poverty Law Center labels American Vision an anti-gay hate group due to its support of the "death penalty for practicing homosexuals".

=== Americans for Truth About Homosexuality ===
Americans for Truth about Homosexuality (AFTAH) is an organization founded by Peter LaBarbera, which describes itself as "dedicated to exposing the homosexual activist agenda". In 2010, AFTAH was designated an anti-gay hate group by the Southern Poverty Law Center (SPLC), which said "AFTAH is notable for its posting of the utterly discredited work of Paul Cameron (of the Family Research Institute), who has claimed that gays and lesbians live vastly shorter lives than heterosexuals".

=== Center for Family and Human Rights ===
The Center for Family and Human Rights (C-Fam) is a United States–based research institute/think tank, founded in 1997, to monitor and affect the policy debate at the United Nations and other international institutions. It was formerly known as the Catholic Family and Human Rights Institute. The 501(c)(3) organization describes its own mission as "to defend life and family at international institutions and to publicize the debate".

The SPLC has characterized the institute as being "heavily focused on global anti-LGBT work", citing its opposition to United Nations efforts to protect LGBT rights and to study and prevent anti-LGBT violence, and praise of American anti-gay activist Scott Lively.

=== Chalcedon Foundation ===
The Chalcedon Foundation is an American Christian Reconstructionist organization founded by Rousas John Rushdoony. It is named after the Council of Chalcedon.

The Chalcedon Foundation has been listed by the SPLC in 2012. The SPLC notes that The Institutes of Biblical Law, written by Rushdoony in 1973, called for strict biblical law that would "mean the death penalty for 'practicing homosexuals,' among many other 'abominators.'"

=== Church Militant ===
Church Militant, also known as Saint Michael's Media, was founded by ex-gay traditionalist Catholic Michael Voris, is an "Ultra-orthodox Catholic propaganda outlet" which pushes an "anti-LGBT agenda" according to the Southern Poverty Law Center.

Hatewatch's 2018 article details that:

Church Militant has also advocated for so-called reparative therapy, better known as gay conversion therapy, which seeks to "cure" homosexuals of their gayness. After the Southern Poverty Law Center sued a New Jersey–based conversion therapy organization and won, the court ruling that Jews Offering New Alternatives to Healing (JONAH) must cease its operations, Church Militant decried the ruling, calling the plaintiffs guilty of dishonesty.

The group has been repudiated by the Catholic Church and has no official affiliation with them and is not an approved Catholic ministry or apostolate.

=== Dove World Outreach Center ===
Dove World Outreach Center is a 50-member non-denominational charismatic Christian church in Gainesville, Florida led by pastor Terry Jones and his wife, Sylvia. The church first gained notice during the late 2000s for its public displays and criticism of Islam and gays, and was designated as a hate group by the SPLC.

In 2012, after President Obama's endorsement of gay marriage, the church hanged an Obama effigy with a rainbow flag on its lawn. In January 2013 effigies of President Obama and President Clinton were burned to protest their abortion and pro-LGBT policies. The Gainesville Sun reported that Terry Jones was fined by the city for the unauthorized fire.

=== Faithful Word Baptist Church ===
Faithful Word Baptist Church is a United States–based fundamentalist Baptist church in Tempe, Arizona. The church is King James Bible only with regard to the Bible, and the church's members meet in an office space located in a strip mall. Steven L. Anderson established the church in December 2005 and remains its pastor. In August 2009, the church received national attention when Anderson shared that he was praying for the death of President Barack Obama in his sermons.

The SPLC has listed the church as an anti-gay hate group, noting that Pastor Anderson described gays as "sodomites" who "recruit through rape", and "recruit through molestation". In explaining the hate group designation, the SPLC said that Anderson suggests that homosexuals should be killed, and in a sermon he stated, "The biggest hypocrite in the world is the person who believes in the death penalty for murderers but not for homosexuals." A few days after the listing, Pastor Anderson stated "I do hate homosexuals, and if hating homosexuals makes our church a hate group, then that's what we are."

=== Family Research Council ===
The Family Research Council (FRC) is an American conservative Christian group and lobbying organization formed in the United States in 1981 by James Dobson. It was incorporated in 1983. In the late 1980s, the FRC officially became a division of Dobson's main organization, Focus on the Family, but after an administrative separation, the FRC became an independent entity in 1992. Tony Perkins is the current president.

The FRC promotes what it considers to be traditional family values, by advocating and lobbying for socially conservative policies. It opposes and lobbies against LGBT rights, abortion, divorce, embryonic stem-cell research, and pornography. The FRC is affiliated with a 501(c)(4) lobbying PAC known as FRC Action.

In May 2010, Sprigg publicly suggested that repealing Don't Ask, Don't Tell policy would encourage molestation of heterosexual service members. In November FRC President Perkins was asked about Sprigg's comments regarding the criminalization of same-sex behavior: he responded that criminalizing homosexuality is not a goal of the Family Research Council. Perkins repeated the FRC's association of gay men with pedophilia, saying that "If you look at the American College of Pediatricians, they say the research is overwhelming that homosexuality poses a danger to children." The American College of Pediatricians is an advocacy group, not a medical association.

Southern Poverty Law Center first designated the FRC as a hate group in 2010. Thereafter the FRC disputed the designation, with President Tony Perkins posting a comment on FRC's website.

=== Family Research Institute ===
The Family Research Institute (FRI), originally known as the Institute for the Scientific Investigation of Sexuality (ISIS), is an American non-profit organization based in Colorado Springs, Colorado, which states that it has "...one overriding mission: to generate empirical research on issues that threaten the traditional family, particularly homosexuality, AIDS, sexual social policy, and drug abuse". The FRI is part of a movement of small, often faith-based organizations (sometimes called the Christian right) which seek to influence the political debate in the United States. They seek "...to restore a world where marriage is upheld and honored, where children are nurtured and protected, and where homosexuality is not taught and accepted, but instead is discouraged and rejected at every level." The Boston Globe reported that the FRI's 2005 budget was less than $200,000.

The FRI is run by Paul Cameron, who earned a doctorate in psychology at the University of Colorado at Boulder in 1966. Cameron founded the Institute for the Scientific Investigation of Sexuality in 1982, and this institute later became the FRI.

The Family Research Institute is designated a hate group by the SPLC for propagating falsehoods about LGBT people. Paul Cameron's studies about homosexuals have been "utterly discredited". Cameron has been removed from professional and scholarly organizations and his studies have been met with formal resolutions passed against him. LaBarbera has endorsed Cameron's research and has said that ways should be found "to bring back shame" for homosexual behavior.

=== Genspect and Society for Evidence-Based Gender Medicine ===
In 2024, SPLC released the report of 2023 tracked organizations and added the two organizations Genspect and Society for Evidence-Based Gender Medicine (SEGM) to the list of anti-LGBTQ hate groups. The two organizations are closely linked with overlap of their membership and their work to spread disinformation to influence healthcare providers, legal professionals, and the public to oppose transgender rights and promote harmful practices such as conversion therapy. They have promoted various anti-transgender rights bills throughout the US and United Kingdom. In the captain report published by the SPLC, they outlined that the two organizations are at the center of the promotion of fringe pseudoscience and promotion of gender exploratory therapy, a form of conversion therapy.

=== Heterosexuals Organized for a Moral Environment ===
Heterosexuals Organized for a Moral Environment (HOME or H.O.M.E.) is an anti-homosexuality organization founded by Wayne Lela and based in Downers Grove, Illinois, United States. The organization's aim is "to use science, logic, and natural law to expose all the flaws in the arguments homosexuals (and bisexuals) use to try to justify homosexual activity." On November 22, 2010, the SPLC designated the organization an anti-gay hate group "based on their propagation of known falsehoods". According to the SPLC, Heterosexuals Organized for a Moral Environment "is entirely focused on the alleged evils of homosexuality [and] attacks gay people on a wide variety of levels."

=== Illinois Family Institute ===
The Illinois Family Institute (IFI) is a 501(c)(3) Christian organization based in Carol Stream, Illinois. Founded in 1992, its mission is focused on "upholding and re-affirming marriage, family, life and liberty in Illinois," and is affiliated with the American Family Association. The organization also has a sister organization, Illinois Family Action, founded in 2010 it is active as a 501(c)(4) lobbying organization in the state of Illinois. The organization's executive director is David E. Smith, who succeeded Peter LaBarbera in 2006.

The Illinois Family Institute was designated an anti-gay hate group in 2009 by the SPLC, on the grounds that it is "heavily focused on attacking gay people and homosexuality in general."

In its Intelligence Report, the SPLC states the designation was based on the association with Paul Cameron, a researcher whose studies about the lives of homosexuals have been "utterly discredited", and on the association with LaBarbera who repeats the disproved link between gay men and pedophilia. Cameron has been removed from professional and scholarly organizations and his studies have been met with formal resolutions passed against him. LaBarbera has endorsed Cameron's research and has said that ways should be found "to bring back shame" for homosexual behavior. As well, Higgins' words were linked to the hate group designation, including her comparison of homosexuality to Nazism.

=== Liberty Counsel ===
Liberty Counsel is a Christian conservative legal advocacy group. Liberty Counsel filed a federal lawsuit against charity rating company GuideStar for marking Liberty Counsel's profile page with the words "This organization was flagged as a hate group by the Southern Poverty Law Center". The court dismissed the lawsuit, ruling that GuideStar's adding of the labels was not commercial speech prohibited by the Lanham Act.

=== MassResistance ===
MassResistance is a Massachusetts anti-gay group that promotes socially conservative positions primarily on issues surrounding homosexuality, the transgender community and same-sex marriage. It was formed in 1995 as a consolidation of the Parents' Rights Coalition, turned into the Article 8 Alliance in 2003, and adopted the current name in 2006. The group has criticized former Massachusetts governor Mitt Romney for not opposing same-sex marriage, and says it fights against students in public schools being taught about homosexuality.

Since March 2008, the SPLC has listed MassResistance as an anti-gay "Active U.S. Hate Group" based on "their propagation of known falsehoods—claims about LGBT people that have been thoroughly discredited by scientific authorities."

=== Mission: America ===
Mission: America is an organization started in 1995 by Linda Harvey which the group's mission states is "cover[ing] the latest cultural and social trends in our country and what they might mean for Christians." A particular focus of the organization's articles is on the issue of homosexuality. The SPLC designated Mission: America as a hate group in March 2012 based on its particular anti-LGBT rights stances.

=== Pacific Justice Institute ===
Pacific Justice Institute is a conservative legal advocacy organization based in Sacramento, California, active in anti-LGBT and anti-vaccination issues. PJI was declared an anti-LGBT hate group in 2014 by the Southern Poverty Law Center due to the group's long history of anti-LGBT rhetoric through its founder.

=== Parents Action League ===
Parents Action League is an organization started in 2010 to protest proposed changes in the Anoka-Hennepin (Minnesota) School District 11 policy which had limited discussions of lesbian, gay, bisexual, and transgender (LGBT) issues in district classrooms. The SPLC designated the organization as an anti-gay hate group in March 2012 because it spread damaging propaganda about LGBT people.

=== Public Advocate of the United States ===
Public Advocate of the United States is an organization founded in 1981 by Eugene Delgaudio. It advocates conservative policies in American politics.

As of 2012, the Public Advocate of the United States has been designated as a hate group by the Southern Poverty Law Center for its anti-gay activism.

=== SaveCalifornia.com ===
SaveCalifornia.com is a United States nonprofit organization founded by Randy Thomasson in 1999, with a stated goal of "defending and representing the values of parents, grandparents and concerned citizens who want what's best for this generation and future generations." Thomasson has been involved in influencing social policies in government since 1994, through various media outlets.

SaveCalifornia.com opposed California's FAIR Education Act. In 2011, Thomasson described the bill as "Sexual brainwashing" and called for "parents to remove their children from the government school system, and get them into the safe havens of church schooling and home schooling." In March 2012, the SPLC added SaveCalifornia.com to its list of anti-gay hate groups.

=== Stedfast Baptist Church ===
The Stedfast Baptist Church is an American church based in Fort Worth, Texas, with a satellite church in Oklahoma City, Oklahoma. The church promotes extremist positions on issues surrounding feminism, homosexuality, same-sex marriage, and alcohol and drug use. The SPLC has designated the church an anti-LGBT hate group. Its founder and pastor, Donnie Romero, garnered national attention in 2016 for celebrating the Pulse nightclub shooting in Orlando, a location popular with LGBT people, stating that God should finish the job, and referring to the murdered patrons as "sodomites", "perverts" and "pedophiles".

In January 2019, pastor Romero resigned from his position after an internal investigation revealed that he had broken church doctrine by hiring prostitutes, cheating on his wife, engaging in gambling, and consuming alcohol and drugs. He was replaced by pastor Jonathan Shelley.

In June 2022, pastor Dillon Awes conducted a hate sermon where he openly stated all gay people should be executed immediately by a gun shot to the back of the head.

=== Traditional Values Coalition ===
The Traditional Values Coalition (TVC) is an American conservative Christian organization that represents, by its estimate, over 43,000 Christian churches throughout the United States. Headquartered in Washington, D.C., its belief is in Bible-based traditional values as "[a] moral code and behavior based upon the Old and New Testaments." The group considers traditional values to include a belief "that Jesus Christ is the Son of God and that the Lord has given us a rule book to live by: The Bible" and a commitment to "living, as far as it is possible, by the moral precepts taught by Jesus Christ and by the whole counsel of God as revealed in the Bible." The organization was founded by the Reverend Louis P. Sheldon who is the current chairman. His daughter Andrea Sheldon Lafferty is the executive director.

The Traditional Values Coalition has been labeled an anti-gay hate group for spreading "known falsehoods—claims about LGBT people that have been thoroughly discredited by scientific authorities—and repeated, groundless name-calling". The Family Research Council organized a petition against the designation.

=== United Families International ===
United Families International (UFI) is a United States nonprofit organization founded in 1978 by Susan Roylance UFI works on an international scale to influence public policy toward "maintaining and strengthening the family". The organization is not affiliated with any religious organizations, governments or political parties. UFI has NGO status with ECOSOC and works to educate United Nations (UN) ambassadors and delegates on family related issues. UFI also operates a website, DefendMarriage.org.

UFI under Roylance was actively involved in promoting "traditional family values" at the Beijing Conference in the mid-1990s. Roylance characterized the conference as a "wakeup call for those who believe the traditional family unit to be an important basic unit of society".

The SPLC designated United Families International as an anti-gay hate group in March 2012.

In their Guide to Family Issues, UFI, considered by some to be part of the Christian right and a Mormon organization, makes a number of claims about homosexuality, including:

- "Discrimination on the basis of gender or race is vastly different from discrimination on the basis of sexual practice."
- "Pedophilia is widespread among the homosexual community."
- "Reputable studies and decades of successful treatment show that homosexual behavior can be changed."
- "It is not marriage, but women in marriage, that help to contain and channel the male sexual appetite."
- "In fact it is more compassionate to discourage homosexuality than to tolerate it."

=== Westboro Baptist Church ===
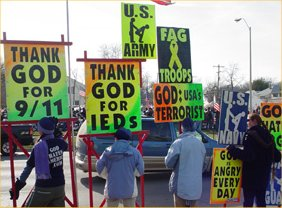
Picketing in Topeka, with the group's signature rainbow-colored picket signs

The Westboro Baptist Church (WBC) is an American church based in Topeka, Kansas, founded by Fred Phelps. The Westboro Baptist Church is known for its extreme ideologies, especially for those which are against homosexuality. The church is widely described as a hate group and it is monitored as such by the Anti-Defamation League (ADL) and the Southern Poverty Law Center. It primarily consists of members of the large family of its founder, the late Fred Phelps; in 2011, the church stated that it had about 40 members. The church is headquartered in a residential neighborhood on the west side of Topeka about three miles west of the Kansas State Capitol. Its first public service was held on the afternoon of Sunday, November 27, 1955.

The church has been actively involved in the anti-gay movement since at least 1991 when it sought a crackdown on homosexual activity in Gage Park six blocks northwest of the church. In addition to anti-gay protests at military funerals, the organization pickets other celebrity funerals and public events that are likely to give it media attention.

The WBC is not affiliated with any known Baptist convention or association and the two largest Baptist denominations, the Baptist World Alliance and the Southern Baptist Convention have both denounced the WBC over the years. The church describes itself as following Primitive Baptist and Calvinist principles.

The church runs numerous Web sites including GodHatesFags.com and GodHatesAmerica.com, which all condemn homosexuality. The group bases its work around its belief which is expressed in its best known slogan and the address of its primary Web site, God Hates Fags, which asserts that every tragedy in the world is linked to homosexuality—specifically society's increasing tolerance and acceptance of the so-called homosexual agenda. The group believes that God hates gays above all other kinds of "sinners" and it also believes that homosexuality should be a capital crime. Its views on homosexuality are partially based on teachings which are found in the Old Testament, specifically in Leviticus 18:22 and 20:13, which they interpret to mean that homosexual behavior is detestable.

The ADL describes the Westboro Baptist Church as being "virulently homophobic", but according to the ADL, its anti-homosexual rhetoric is often a cover for antisemitism, anti-Americanism, racism, and anti-Catholicism. The SPLC added the Westboro Baptist Church to its list of hate groups in 2010.

=== World Congress of Families ===
World Congress of Families is a United States organization that promotes Christian right values internationally. It opposes same-sex marriage, pornography, and abortion, while supporting a society built on "the voluntary union of a man and a woman in a lifelong covenant of marriage". WCF comprises organizations in several countries, and most of its member partners are strongly active campaigners for pro-life positions and specific Christian views on marriage that oppose same-sex marriage. WCF was formed in 1997 and is active worldwide, regularly organizing "large international 'pro-family' conventions". Its opposition to gay marriage and abortion has attracted criticism. It was added to the list of anti-LGBT hate groups in February 2014 for its involvement with the 2013 Russian LGBT propaganda law and opposing LGBT rights internationally.

=== You Can Run But You Cannot Hide International ===
You Can Run But You Cannot Hide International (YCRBYCHI) was a United States–based organization which identified itself as a Christian youth ministry that held assemblies, including music concerts and discussions with students, in public schools. Founded by Bradlee Dean, the organization was based in Annandale, Minnesota. YCRBYCHI's mission statement was: "To reshape America by re-directing the current and future generations both morally and spiritually through education, media, and the Judeo-Christian values found in our U.S. Constitution."

The organization garnered letters of support from school personnel, as well as some religious and political figures. It also drew controversy for using assemblies for religious purposes, misleading school administrators about the nature of the program, and proselytizing its views on abortion and homosexuality.

The SPLC designated the organization as an anti-gay hate group in March 2012. In addition to "rhetoric about executing gays and lesbians", You Can Run But You Cannot Hide's president and CEO, Bradlee Dean, has stated that homosexuals "on average, they molest 117 people before they're found out. How many kids have been destroyed, how many adults have been destroyed because of crimes against nature?" In response to media coverage, Dean has written an editorial alleging that his statements were taken out of context, and produced a video which sought to rebut the media's reporting on his statements. The SPLC linked Dean, among other anti-gay hate group leaders, to nativist movements that made an increase in numbers on their hate groups list.

== See also ==
- List of Ku Klux Klan organizations
- List of neo-Nazi organizations
- List of white nationalist organizations
