= Anna Novak =

American politician

Member of the North Dakota House of Representatives from the 33rd district
- Incumbent
- Assumed office December 1, 2022 Serving with Bill Tveit

Personal details
- Party: Republican

Anna S. Novak is an American politician. She is serving as a member of the North Dakota House of Representatives from the 33rd district, alongside Bill Tveit. She is a member of the Republican Party.
