= Mission: America =

American Christian right organization

- Founded: September 27, 1995
- Founder: Linda P. Harvey
- Type: Nonprofit 501(c)(3)
- Tax ID no.: 31-1597212 (EIN)
- Location: Columbus, Ohio
- Key people: Linda Harvey, President
- Revenue: $23,047 (2011)
- Website: missionamerica.com

Mission: America is an American Christian right organization based in Columbus, Ohio and founded in 1995 that seeks to "cover the latest cultural and social trends in our country and what they might mean for Christians." The organization publishes articles on its web site about its views on homosexuality and paganism. Mission: America's founder and president, Linda Harvey, is an outspoken critic of LGBT rights, including same-sex marriage.

The Southern Poverty Law Center designated Mission: America as an active anti-gay hate group in March 2012 based on its particular anti-LGBT rights stances.

== History ==
According to founder Linda Harvey, Mission: America was founded with the objective of equipping "Christians with current, accurate information about cultural issues such as feminism, homosexuality, education and New Age influences."

Harvey is a radio talk show host on WRFD in Columbus, and also writes commentary for WorldNetDaily. In January 2008, she authored Not My Child; Contemporary Paganism & New Spirituality. The book discusses the author's view that "casual occultism permeates youth culture" and suggests tips for parents as well as classroom lessons.

The group's "School Risk Audit" program was conducted jointly by Mission America, the American Family Association, Concerned Women for America, the Family Research Council, and other groups. It was launched in April 2006. Its stated purpose is to assess what it sees as schools' promotion of homosexuality such as anti-bullying programs that include acceptance of different sexual orientations, and non-discrimination policies that include sexual orientation. The plan has received support from Exodus Mandate, an evangelical Christian group supporting home-schooling.

In March 2012, the Southern Poverty Law Center designated Mission America as an active anti-gay hate group. The group has denied this characterization. Mission America had previously launched a campaign to get the website "Prop 8 Maps" listed by the SPLC as a hate group.

== Positions ==
According to Mission America, the organization promotes "Biblical morality", though e-mail, videos and its website, seeking to reach American Christians. A major issue for the organization is what they refer to as the "burgeoning and increasingly fascist 'gay rights' movement".

=== Literary views ===
Harvey criticized author Alex Sanchez' novel Rainbow Boys in her 2002 essay "The World According to PFLAG: Why PFLAG and Children Don't Mix Unless You Happen to Like Child Abuse".

=== LGBT rights ===
In March 2018, Harvey says homosexuality is God's punishment for abortion.

In speaking against the Equality Act in December 2015, Harvey said that endorsing LGBT equality measures is "the least compassionate, the meanest and most hateful thing you can do" because it will cause more people to think it's okay to be LGBT.

In 2011, Harvey said that gay rights advocates were "masters of demonic manipulation" while speaking as a guest on Peter LaBarbera's radio program. She has also referred to the It Gets Better video project as "wrong, it's evil, it's dark". In that same broadcast, she referred to LaBarbera as her "good friend". LaBarbera heads the organization Americans for Truth about Homosexuality. Harvey opposes efforts to decriminalize homosexuality in Jamaica, promoting a petition that declares Caribbean societies are "under attack" from gay rights supporters. She describes LGBT anti-discrimination orders as "anti-Christian gag orders" whose goal is to "criminalize speech and Christian faith."

In August 2011, Harvey stated on her weekend radio show that "There is no proof that there's ever anything like a gay, lesbian or bisexual or transgendered child, or teen or human," and that openly gay people should not be allowed to teach in public schools.

== See also ==
- List of organizations designated by the Southern Poverty Law Center as anti-LGBT hate groups
