= United Families International =

United States nonprofit organization

- United Families International Logo
- Founded: 1978
- Founder: Susan Roylance
- Type: Public charity 501(c)(3)
- Tax ID no.: 57-0658997 (EIN)
- Location: Gilbert, Arizona
- Region served: International
- Members: 7
- Owner: United Families Foundation
- Key people: Carol Soelberg, President; Phil Marriott, Chairman
- Revenue: $54,791 (2010)
- Website: unitedfamilies.org

United Families International (UFI) is a United States nonprofit organization founded in 1978 by Susan Roylance. UFI works on an international scale to influence public policy toward "maintaining and strengthening the family". UFI has NGO status with ECOSOC and works to spread their opinion to United Nations (UN) ambassadors and delegates on family related issues. UFI also operates a website, DefendMarriage.org. They are listed by the Southern Poverty Law Center (SPLC) as an anti-gay hate group. but are supported by and in agreement with significant portions of the Christian conservative coalition.

== History ==
United Families International was founded in 1978 by Susan Roylance of Washington state and Jan Clark of South Carolina. The group actively promotes what it believes are "traditional family values" locally, nationally, and internationally, such as at the Beijing Conference in the mid-1990s. Roylance characterized the conference as a "wakeup call for those who believe the traditional family unit to be an important basic unit of society".

The organization received ECOSOC accreditation and participated in the World Congress of Families II Conference in Switzerland in 1999. UFI has brought its platform to international organizations, including the UN in 2002, at which it joined more than 300 activists in urging diplomats to "reaffirm marriage and promote sexual abstinence among teen-agers". Sharon Slater, UFI's president at the time asked UN diplomats "to ensure that religions are respected and protected in U.N. documents, insofar as they respect the family and the dignity of the human person".

The Southern Poverty Law Center (SPLC) first designated United Families International as an anti-gay hate group in 2012.

== Issues ==
=== Political involvement ===
UFI, considered by some to be part of the Christian right and a Mormon organization, is connected with several politicians in Arizona. Republican U.S. Representative Andy Biggs is the former policy advisor to UFI and his wife Cindy is the secretary and treasurer of the organization. Republican state Representative Cecil Ash and his wife are also affiliated with the organization.

In 2006, UFI contributed $50,000 in support of Arizona Proposition 107, the Protect Marriage Arizona initiative, a proposed same-sex marriage ban that was ultimately defeated.

=== Homosexuality ===
In their Guide to Family Issues UFI makes a number of claims about homosexuality, including

- "Discrimination on the basis of gender or race is vastly different from discrimination on the basis of sexual practice."
- "Pedophilia is widespread among the homosexual community."
- "Reputable studies and decades of successful treatment show that homosexual behavior can be changed."
- "It is not marriage, but women in marriage, that help to contain and channel the male sexual appetite."
- "In fact it is more compassionate to discourage homosexuality than to tolerate it."

== See also ==
- List of organizations designated by the Southern Poverty Law Center as anti-gay hate groups
- Family Watch International
