= Illinois Family Institute =

American Christian organization

- Formation: March 28, 1990; 36 years ago
- Founder: Penny Pullen
- Type: Non-profit 501(c)(3)
- Tax ID no.: 37-1265883 (EIN)
- Location: Tinley Park, Illinois
- Region served: Illinois
- Key people: David E. Smith, Executive Director; Dr. John J. Koehler, Chairman; Dan Reynolds, President; Pastor Richard Giovannetti, Secretary; John Links, VP/Treasurer; Kathy Valente, Director of Operations; Laurie Higgins, Cultural analyst
- Website: illinoisfamily.org

The Illinois Family Institute (IFI) is a Christian organization based in Tinley Park, Illinois. Founded in 1990, its stated mission is "upholding and re-affirming marriage, family, life and liberty in Illinois", and it is affiliated with the American Family Association. The organization's legislative arm is the 501(c)(4) lobbying group Illinois Family Action, founded in 2010. The organization's executive director is David E. Smith, who in 2006, succeeded Peter LaBarbera, founder of Americans for Truth about Homosexuality.

IFI is a vocal opponent of abortion, separation of church and state, "activist judges", the "marriage penalty", civil unions, same-sex marriage, gambling and drug legalization.

== History ==
The Illinois Family Institute (IFI) was founded by former Illinois State Representative Penny Pullen as a nonprofit corporation on March 28, 1990, in Tinley Park, Illinois. Pullen, whom President Ronald Reagan had appointed to the President's Commission on the HIV Epidemic in 1987, served as IFI's first executive director starting on January 14, 1992.

IFI was founded as "an educational and grassroots action resource for public policy issues that affect Illinois citizens and their families". IFI is affiliated with organizations including Liberty Counsel, the American Family Association (AFA), and Alliance Defense Fund. IFI's executive director, David E. Smith, has been involved with the organization since March 2004.

In 2003, Peter LaBarbera was named head of the Focus on the Family affiliate, Illinois Family Institute. LaBarbera previously worked at Concerned Women for America, and was the editor of an anti-gay journal called The Lambda Report on Homosexual Activism.

In 2006, Illinois Family Institute organized a drive to collect 345,199 signatures on petitions for "Protect Marriage Illinois", a proposed referendum to amend the Illinois constitution to declare that "marriage between a man and a woman is the only legal union that shall be valid or recognized in this State". The same year, LaBarbera called for the repeal of legislation prohibiting discrimination against gays. He called homosexuality "disgusting" and expressed the "need to find ways to bring back shame to those practicing homosexual behavior". Later that year, LaBarbera left IFI to return to a group he founded in 1996, Americans for Truth About Homosexuality (AFTAH), which claims to be "dedicated to confronting the homosexual activist agenda" and is also designated as an anti-gay hate group by the SPLC. In August 2006, David E. Smith succeeded LaBarbera as IFI's Executive Director after having joined IFI in 2004 as a Senior Policy Analyst.

Laurie Higgins joined IFI as cultural analyst and Kathy Valente joined as Director of operations in 2008. Higgins previously worked for Deerfield High School's writing center. Higgins resigned from IFI in January 2023. Valente was the state director for Concerned Women for America for four years prior to joining IFI.

In 2010, after Jim Daly of Focus on the Family announced plans to "cultivate a less severe image", IFI's Laurie Higgins responded "If the family is FOF's mission, then they better figure out how to stop the pro-homosexual juggernaut--nicely, of course--because soon every child from kindergarten through high school will be taught about 'diverse family structures' and Heather's two nice mommies".

In 2012, IFI called for parents to remove their children from classrooms led by teachers who support LGBT related instruction. In their document, Challenge Teachers, Not Books, they encouraged parents to "object to teachers rather than texts", offering suggestions for parents who are "fed up with the subtle and not so subtle messages that activist teachers of a liberal bent work into their classroom teaching through their classroom comments, curricular materials... and even their desks and classroom displays".

== Positions ==
Illinois Family Institute opposes abortion, separation of church and state, "activist judges", and the "marriage penalty". They further oppose the recognition of civil unions, same-sex marriage and all laws recognizing or protecting non-heterosexual relationships or activity. They also oppose the expansion of gambling in Illinois and drug legalization. IFI explicitly opposes "efforts to include 'sexual orientation' and 'gender identity' as a categories [sic] for preferential status under civil rights statutes at the federal, state and local levels".

=== Evolution ===
IFI supports teaching of creationism in school as a way to present "both sides of an argument" even though a 1987 U.S. Supreme Court ruling bars creationism from science classes on constitutional grounds, because it would tend to endorse religion or a particular religious belief.

As early as 1996, IFI consultants made recommendations to Illinois educators to keep explicit references to evolution out of public school classrooms in Illinois, a recommendation that was approved in July 1997. According to IFI, "those efforts enabled us to keep objectionable sex education and mandatory teaching of evolution out of the standards, leaving such issues to local control". IFI's efforts were credited with the then-unpublicized elimination of word from Illinois school curricula.

=== Civil unions ===
When the State of Illinois passed legislation in 2011 creating the option of civil unions, IFI's Executive Director stated in an interview "Unfortunately, this social experiment will have a ripple effect on our culture that will touch every American and, most tragically, our children. What is happening here in Illinois is a tragic attempt by radical forces to advance a political agenda by using the authority of the government to validate wrong and unhealthy relationships." According to Smith, the IFI is concerned that through civil unions, children will be taught in school that homosexuality is normal and something they might want to try.

=== LGBT Issues ===
Illinois Family Institute has been criticized for some of its positions, most notably their stances on LGBT issues. In 2009, Laurie Higgins, the directory of school advocacy for IFI said: "There was something profoundly good for society about the prior stigmatization of homosexual practice". The Institute has also strongly opposed speeches and presentations by Dan Savage of the It Gets Better Project which campaigns to help prevent suicide among LGBT youth.

IFI called for a boycott of U.S. retailer Target Corporation in 2004, after Target banned Salvation Army bell ringers from collecting donations in front of its stores, under pressure from LGBT advocacy groups. IFI and the American Family Association threatened to boycott Kraft Foods and Harris Bank in 2005 for sponsoring the Gay Games, a gay and lesbian sporting event in Chicago; neither Kraft nor Harris Bank withdrew their sponsorship.

=== Anti-bullying ===
In 2012, Illinois state Senator Heather Steans, sponsored legislation that would require Illinois schools to discourage bullying by adopting anti-bullying policies. IFI and other conservative groups opposed the bill, claiming its real goal was "to use public education to promote unproven, non-factual beliefs about the nature and morality of homosexuality and 'transgenderism'." IFI's Laurie Higgins has been an outspoken critic of efforts to stop LGBT-related bullying in schools. On IFI's website, Higgins wrote "If you care about children's temporal and eternal lives, please oppose any anti-bullying efforts in public schools that imply that homosexual behavior is worthy of affirmation."

Higgins has expressed that she does not condone bullying and she believes it is reprehensible. She also states that "conservatives need to better understand how "progressives" (or more accurately, "transgressives") cynically exploit the issue of bullying to promote their causes and ideologies." She draws a distinction between bona fide bullying and simple ideological disagreement, primarily on First Amendment grounds.

== Southern Poverty Law Center designation ==
Illinois Family Institute was designated an anti-gay hate group in 2009 by the Southern Poverty Law Center. The SPLC report stated that IFI was "heavily focused on attacking gay people and homosexuality in general." The SPLC further stated that the organization had "occasionally embraced the groundless propaganda of Paul Cameron", a researcher whose studies about the life expectancy of homosexuals the SPLC says have been "utterly discredited." Although IFI removed the Cameron advocacy from their website in 2009, SPLC maintains that IFI retains a "hard-line position" on homosexuality. In its November 2010 Intelligence Report, the SPLC again listed IFI as an anti-gay hate group, citing rhetoric from Higgins which included the "likening the German Evangelical Church's weak response to fascism to the "American church's failure to respond appropriately to the spread of radical, heretical, destructive views of homosexuality".

== See also ==
- Eagle Forum
- Intelligent design
- LGBT rights in Illinois
- Recognition of same-sex unions in Illinois
- The Civil Rights Agenda
