= Gretchen Dobervich =

American politician

Member of the North Dakota House of Representatives from the 11th district
- Incumbent
- Assumed office December 1, 2016
- Preceded by: Kris Wallman
- Succeeded by: Doug Sharbono (elect)

Personal details
- Born: February 4, 1973 (age 53) Bismarck, North Dakota, U.S.
- Party: Democratic-NPL
- Spouse: Eric
- Education: Minot State University (B.S.W.) North Dakota State University Master of Public Health

Gretchen Dobervich (born February 4, 1973) is an American politician. She is a Democratic-NPL member of the North Dakota House of Representatives who has represented District 11 since October 2016. District 11 is in south central Fargo and includes Fargo South High, Carl Ben Eielson Middle School, Lewis and Clark Elementary, and Lindenwood Park.

== Biography ==
Dobervich was born in Bismarck, North Dakota and was raised on a farm and ranch in Slope County, North Dakota. She graduated from Divide County High School in 1991. Dobervich received a Bachelor of Social Work from Minot State University. She is married to Eric Michael Dobervich.

== Career ==
Dobervich is a licensed social worker in the state of North Dakota. She was previously employed by HCR ManorCare, FirstLINK and the Alzheimer's Association Minnesota-North Dakota. Dobervich is currently employed as Public Health Policy Manager for the American Indian Public Health Resource Center at North Dakota State University, and is currently pursuing a Master of Public Health degree.

In 2016 she was appointed to the North Dakota House of Representatives to fill a seat vacated by Representative Kris Wallman. During the 65th Session of the North Dakota Legislature, Dobervich served on the House Industry, Business and Labor, and Transportation Committees. During the 65th Session Interim she served on the Health Services and Health Care Reform Committees.

She serves as the current President of the North Dakota Rural Health Association, and sits on the CHI Health at Home Board of Directors. Dobervich is a member of the American Public Health Association, North Dakota Public Health Association, North Dakota Rural Health Association, the Daughters of the American Revolution Dakotah Chapter, American Legion Auxiliary Post 151 Harry W Lindberg, North Dakota Farmers Union and an Awesome Foundation Cass Clay trustee. She previously has served as the Chairperson, Co-Chair, and Secretary for the District 11 Dem-NPL.

In 2026, Dobervich announced that she would not run for re-election in that year's election.
