= Massachusetts Gender Identity Anti-Discrimination Initiative =

Massachusetts Question 3, 2018
- November 6, 2018
- Gender Identity Anti-Discrimination Veto Referendum
- Voting system: First Past the Post

Results
Choice	Votes	%
Yes	1,806,742	67.82%
No	857,401	32.18%
Valid votes	2,664,143	96.78%
Invalid or blank votes	88,522	3.22%
Total votes	2,752,665	100.00%

Yes
90–100%
80–90%
70–80%
60–70%
50–60%
No
70–80%
60–70%
50–60%

The Massachusetts Gender Identity Anti-Discrimination Initiative is a state-wide referendum passed by Massachusetts voters in the 6 November 2018 mid-term election that prohibits discrimination in public accommodations on the basis of gender identity. The vote upholds language which was already present in the state anti-discrimination statute, defeating an attempt to veto it by public referendum. It is the first state-wide anti-discrimination statute passed by referendum supporting transgender rights in the United States.

== Statute ==
On July 7, 2016, “An Act Relative to Transgender Anti-Discrimination” (Senate Bill 2407) was passed by a voice vote in the Senate and 117-36 in the House. It was signed by Governor of Massachusetts Charlie Baker the next day. It took effect on October 1, 2016. It amended Section 92A of chapter 272 of the General Laws to cover "gender identity" in "any place of public accommodation, resort or amusement that lawfully segregates or separates access...based on a person’s sex" such that all individuals shall be treated "consistent with the person’s gender identity." The places of "public accommodation" where discrimination is forbidden include, according to GLAD, "restaurants, libraries, hotels, malls, public transportation, and beyond," as well as "bathrooms and locker rooms."

== Support for the "No" vote ==
Keep MA Safe opposed the 2016 anti-discrimination law and advocated its repeal. A press release on their website dated September 28, 2016, said that "hundreds of volunteers" had met the deadline to provide the 32,375 signatures required to get the question on the ballot.

Their campaign finance report filed September 7, 2018, indicated that the group raised $286,000 since the campaign began in 2017. Of this, $106,300 was raised in 2018.

An older group, MassResistance, founded by Brian Camenker in 1995, feared that Keep MA Safe's campaign was inadequate. One month before the election, MassResistance began its own splinter campaign with its preferred, "admittedly more inflammatory alternative" message that gender is determined by sex, that transgender identity is a mental disorder, and that there should be no civil rights based on transgender identity.

Several days after the election, MassResistance published an article undercutting Keep MA Safe's main argument. The claim that transgender women pose a threat in public bathrooms, MassResistance alleged, was an invention. MassResistance said that this "largely contrived" position had been used in the Massachusetts political campaign mainly because it appealed to emotion and had been used successfully when the city of Houston voted against housing and employment rights three years earlier; however, it had failed in Massachusetts. "Our side concocted the 'bathroom safety' male predator argument," MassResistance claimed.

== Support for the "Yes" vote ==
Freedom For All Massachusetts, also known as "Yes on 3," formed to campaign for the "Yes" vote to preserve the existing anti-discrimination law.

The political advocacy coalition included:

- hundreds of large and small businesses, including Google, Facebook, Twitter, and healthcare organizations including Boston Children's Hospital;
- hundreds of clergy and congregations;
- 47 "sexual assault, domestic violence and women’s organizations";
- 28 higher education organizations;
- 16 labor unions;
- 172 nonprofit and advocacy organizations including the ACLU, the Anti-Defamation League, the Boston Bar Association, the Boston Public Library, the Massachusetts Public Health Association, the Massachusetts Society for the Prevention of Cruelty to Children, the Museum of Science, the National Association of Social Workers, National Organization for Women (Massachusetts Chapter), New England Philharmonic, Victim Rights Law Center (Massachusetts Chapter), Women's Bar Association (WBA) of Massachusetts, and multiple YWCAs;
- "every major New England professional sports team" including the Red Sox, Celtics, Bruins, and Patriots, as well as the sports arena TD Garden;
- 29 mayors, including those of Boston, Cambridge, Somerville, Worcester, Northampton, Framingham, Salem, and Lowell;
- Massachusetts law enforcement organizations including the Chiefs of Police, Major City Chiefs, and Association of Minority Law Enforcement Officers;
- the Massachusetts Attorney General Maura Healey;
- politicians from both parties in the state House and Senate; and
- "the entire Massachusetts congressional delegation."

Freedom for All Massachusetts' campaign finance report filed September 7, 2018, indicated that the group raised $2.7 million since the campaign began in 2017. Of this, $1.8 million was raised in 2018.

"Yes" was endorsed by the city councils of Boston, Cambridge, Somerville, Melrose, Arlington, Lexington, and Northampton. It was "wholeheartedly" endorsed by The Boston Globe newspaper, and The Salem News also urged a "Yes" vote.

== Election result ==
The vote on November 6, 2018, affirmed the law, 67.8 percent to 32.2 percent (1,781,041 to 846,804).

== Studies ==
Amira Hasenbush, Andrew R. Flores, and Jody L. Herman of the Williams Institute at the UCLA School of Law determined that the anti-discrimination laws in several cities did not affect the local rate of crimes reported in restrooms. They examined Massachusetts cities before and after they passed such laws (which the cities had done to protect transgender people before the 2016 anti-discrimination law was applied statewide) as well as Massachusetts cities that never passed any such law. The study was published in Sexuality Research and Social Policy in July 2018.

A 2013 study of transgender and gender-nonconforming adult residents of Massachusetts found that 65% of respondents had experienced discrimination in public accommodations (in some cases, regarding bathrooms) within the previous year.

== Polling ==
Date(s) conducted	Yes	No	Undecided	Lead	Margin of error	Sample	Conducted by	Method
October 25–28, 2018	68%	26%	7%	42%	± 4.4%	502 likely voters	The MassINC Polling Group	Landline and cell phone live interviews
October 24–27, 2018	68%	28%	4%	40%	± 4.4%	500 likely voters	Suffolk University Political Research Center	Landline and cell phone live interviews
September 13–17, 2018	73.2%	17.4%	9.2%	55.8%	-	500 likely voters	Suffolk University Political Research Center	
June 14, 2018	48.8%	37.2%	14%	11.6%	-	500 likely voters	Suffolk University Political Research Center	
May 22–26, 2018	52%	38%	11%	14%	± 4.4%	501 registered voters	The MassINC Polling Group	Landline and cell phone live interviews

== See also ==
- Bathroom bill
- 2015 referendum on housing nondiscrimination for LGBT people in Houston, Texas
- LGBT rights in Massachusetts
- 2018 voter initiative on transgender rights in Anchorage, Alaska
- List of U.S. ballot initiatives to repeal LGBT anti-discrimination laws
- Transgender rights in the United States
- Trans bashing
- United States elections, 2018
