= Billy McCormack (Louisiana pastor) =

American pastor (1928–2012)

Billy Ervin McCormack
- Born: August 4, 1928; Bienville Parish, Louisiana, USA
- Died: May 31, 2012 (aged 83); Shreveport, Louisiana
- Resting place: Providence Cemetery, Ringgold, Louisiana
- Education: Northwestern State University; National Christian University
- Occupations: Southern Baptist clergyman National director of Christian Coalition of America
- Years active: c. 1950–2012
- Political party: Republican
- Spouse(s): Carolyn Tomme (d. 2005); Barbara Talley (m. 2006–12, his death)
- Children: Victoria Lynn Williams; Patricia Jane McCormack Reeves; William Michael McCormack

Billy Ervin McCormack (August 4, 1928 – May 31, 2012) was a Southern Baptist clergyman from Shreveport, Louisiana, active for more than sixty years in the ministry. McCormack was one of the four national directors of the Christian Coalition of America, an organization assembled in 1989 by televangelist Pat Robertson.

From 1981 until his death, McCormack was the senior pastor of the University Worship Center, or University Baptist Church, at 9000 East Kings Highway in Shreveport. Previously, McCormack was the pastor of three other area congregations. He was the founder and headmaster of Trinity Heights Christian Academy and University Christian Prep School, both at 4800 Old Morringsport Road, and the University Montessori School at the East Kings Highway location.

== Background ==
McCormack was born in Bienville Parish, to Charles T. "Charlie" McCormack (1904–1981) and Ida Mae McCormack (1908–1999), some two years before the outbreak of the Great Depression. McCormack describes his upbringing and resulting political philosophy, accordingly:

I was a son of a sharecropper. ... People talk about African Americans who endured the rigors of sharecropping, but there were plenty of us white people who suffered the same hardship. My father literally dug a living out of the dirt. He never complained. He always whistled happily when coming to the house after a long work day. He worked til dark every day and a half day on Saturday. His education was limited. He had only four years of elementary school. Even so he had an appetite for reading. He had little or no money but he subscribed to the morning paper and many times he would subscribe to the evening paper.

He became a fan of Huey P. Long. He was not mesmerized by him, but [thought Long] ... would find a way to help poor people like him to get a break in life. As governor, Long had blacktopped the roads, made education more accessible to the poor, and brought Louisiana into the 20th century. Elected to the U.S. Senate, he had big plans for the entire nation. President Franklin D. Roosevelt had great concerns of Huey's popularity ... [Long's] message was resonating with depression-plagued people across the country. Some people, to this day, believe FDR arranged Long's assassination. ...

Huey P. Long was a very wealthy man. He was unscrupulous in his acquiring a fortune and he passed it on to his children and they to their children ... Socialist leaders always find a way to get wealth and hand out crumbs to the poor to keep them in line and stay in power. History is trying to repeat itself. Socialists are preaching the distribution of wealth in the same manner as Huey P. Long, but with a more sophisticated twist. They fain identification with the poor in their efforts to control them. Modern-day socialists and communists are well organized in this country. They have been making great strides toward their goal of power and control. Last November's election [2010] may have put brakes on their speed, but they will continue to try to subvert America.

In 1952, McCormack graduated with a bachelor's degree from Northwestern State University in Natchitoches, Louisiana. He also received a master's degree from NSU and a Ph.D. from National Christian University, which operated in Arlington, Texas, between 1967 and 1975.

== Christian ministry ==
In 1987, McCormack was named the Louisiana state coordinator of the "Americans for Robertson" presidential campaign. Pat Robertson's weak showing in the 1988 Republican presidential primaries resulted in the nomination and election of Vice President George Herbert Walker Bush to the presidency. The closing of Jerry Falwell's Moral Majority and the fallout from scandals involving several nationally known televangelists, such as Jim Bakker and Jimmy Swaggart, led the Religious Right to shift its concentration away from national politics to activities in local communities. McCormack urged Robertson to found the Christian Coalition. Robertson agreed and hired the young historian Ralph E. Reed, Jr., as the first executive director of the organization. McCormack was the director of the Pastor's Council of the Christian Coalition and the southern regional director of the Freedom Council, which Robertson established in an effort to recruit Christians into politics and government.

In addition to "director", McCormack held the title "vice president" of the Christian Coalition. The other directors were Robertson, his son Gordon P. Robertson, and Dick Weinhold of the Texas organization. The McCormack-led Robertson forces and other conservative allies in 1988 gained control of the Louisiana Republican State Central Committee. They blocked efforts to denounce David Duke, who from 1989 to 1992 was a Republican member of the Louisiana House of Representatives. Duke subsequently waged losing campaigns for U.S. Senator and governor in 1990 and 1991, respectively. Claims surfaced that Duke sold from his House office copies of such works as Adolf Hitler's Mein Kampf.

In 1989, the national GOP, led by former President Ronald W. Reagan and the first President Bush, repudiated Duke, who narrowly won a special election for the state House; it was not until November 1990 that Robertson publicly urged McCormack to "examine" Duke's record. McCormack stopped short of a public endorsement of Duke in the 1991 gubernatorial showdown with Edwin Edwards; Duke still received 69 percent of the white evangelical vote. McCormack was seated beside President Bush at a Conservative Coalition gathering in September 1992 at Robertson's walled estate in Virginia Beach, Virginia.

In early August 1994, McCormack invited Bill Horn and Peter LaBarbera, two opponents of homosexual rights, to Shreveport to make a presentation. Horn produced the video "The Gay Agenda"; La Barbera edited the newsletter the Lambda Report. After this meeting, the University Baptist Church burned to the ground. Though arson had been first suspected, authorities determined that the facility had instead been struck by lightning.

In the 1950s, along with the staunchly segregationist newspaper publisher Ned Touchstone of Bossier City, McCormack had been an aide to Democratic U.S. Representative Overton Brooks, for whom the Veterans Administration Hospital in Shreveport is named. In time, however, McCormack endorsed civil rights for racial minorities. He served on Shreveport's Human Relations Commission, the Black History Committee, and the Martin Luther King Birthday Committee. For two years, he chaired the Human Rights Conference.

In 2000, McCormack represented the Christian Coalition at the Million Family March held on the fifth anniversary of the Million Man March, organized in 1995 in Washington, D.C., by the Reverend Louis Farrakhan of the Nation of Islam. Joining McCormack on the stage was the Reverend Sun Myung Moon of the Unification Church of South Korea. McCormack said that prior to 2000 he had earlier been misinformed about Farrakhan:

but when I heard that Minister Farrakhan had called for an agenda of love and reconciliation of the races, I knew I had to come and express my gratitude ... He is the one man that has the ear of so many people in America ... The Christian Coalition [has] been stereotyped quite well through the media as someone that's not acting in all peoples' best interest, but my being here is an indication that we stand for the rights of all people ... to work together and love one another for the Kingdom of God ...

In 2008, McCormack joined other ministers in the endorsement of former Governor Mike Huckabee of Arkansas for the Republican presidential nomination, which was ultimately taken by U.S. Senator John McCain of Arizona. In his support for Huckabee, McCormack described the Arkansan as "not only well equipped for the presidency, he has demonstrated godly and righteous leadership in government ... He will unify evangelicals nationwide ... He is America's logical choice."

McCormack preached against alcohol abuse, which he called "the one social problem that stands beyond all the others". He elaborates:

I have been to the grave sites of people who have died of alcoholism, perished in automobile accidents [because of] someone's drinking, succumbed to grief and depression, died having been battered to death, and suicide. The cost of this problem is incalculable from every standpoint. Four percent of all deaths worldwide are caused by alcohol. According to the World Health Organization, approximately 2.5 million people die from alcohol-related causes. [Especially impacted] are younger- age groups. [Alcohol] is the leading risk factor of death among males aged 15 to 59. It is a causal factor in 60 types of diseases and injuries. Its consumption has been linked to cirrhosis of the liver, epilepsy, poisonings, road traffic accidents, violence, and several types of cancer ...

== Death ==
McCormack died in Shreveport at the age of eighty-three. He was preceded in death by his first wife, the former Carolyn Tomme (1933–2005), a native of Ringgold in Bienville Parish, and a brother, Dr. Jack McCormack. His second wife is the former Barbara Talley, who was a widow in Arkansas at the time of their marriage in 2006. The couple met on-line, found immediate compatibility, and married in an Arkansas courthouse as soon as they met.

From his first marriage, McCormack had three children: Victoria Lynn Williams and her husband, Charles William Williams; Patricia Jane McCormack Reeves, and William Michael McCormack and his wife, Cynthia. Services were held at the University Worship Center; officiating was Dr. Carlos G. Spaht, II, the older son of Carlos Spaht, a judge from Baton Rouge who ran unsuccessfully for governor in 1952. He is interred at Providence Cemetery in Ringgold.

Daniel Eugene "Dan" Perkins (born 1953), a Christian Coalition member and a Republican state senatorial candidate in 1999 against the late Ron Bean of Shreveport, was a pallbearer at McCormack's funeral. Of McCormack, Perkins said: "Though he influenced thousands worldwide, Pastor McCormack would cancel his plans and return home every time a member of his congregation was in need. That repeated scenerio [sic] displayed his true heart and "calling" as a pastor above all else. ..."
