= Family Watch International =

Hate Group

- Founded: 1999; 27 years ago
- Founder: Sharon Slater
- Tax ID no.: 86-0981658 (EIN)
- Location: Gilbert, AZ
- Region served: International
- Key people: Laura Cunliffe, executive director
- Website: familywatch.org
- Formerly called: Global Helping to Advance Women and Children

Family Watch International (FWI) is a fundamentalist Christian lobbying organization. Founded in 1999, the organization opposes homosexuality, legal abortion, birth control, comprehensive sex education, and other things that it regards as threats to the divinely ordained "natural family." It has a strong presence in Africa, where it promotes conservative policy and attitudes about sexuality through its United Nations (UN) consultative status.

Under the name Global Helping to Advance Women and Children it is registered as a 501(c)(3) nonprofit organization headquartered in Gilbert, Arizona in the United States.

The Southern Poverty Law Center classifies FWI as a hate group because it "promotes anti-LGBT pseudoscience that includes the falsehood that homosexuality is a mental disorder."

== History ==
The organization's president, Sharon Slater, cofounded FWI after attending the World Congress of Families in Geneva, Switzerland in 1999. The organization remains affiliated with the World Congress of Families.

Martin Ssempa, a FWI volunteer coordinator and pastor in Uganda, emerged in the 2010s as a prominent supporter of a bill making homosexuality punishable by death. FWI distanced itself from Ssempa when his support for the bill became public. Slater wrote that her organization had a "complicated" position on the Ugandan anti-homosexuality bill.

In 2011 and 2012 FWI cosponsored a meeting for UN delegates called the Global Family Policy Forum. Speakers at the forum advocated for the idea of "curing" homosexuality using conversion therapy.

In June 2023, Uganda passed a law making homosexual acts punishable by life imprisonment or by death, in some cases. The president said they had learned that homosexuality is a mental disease. Immediately, homosexual people in Uganda faced violence and an activist stated it was Sharon Slater, from Family Watch International that had lobbied for the passing of the law in Uganda.

=== Stop CSE ===
In 2019 FWI launched a campaign called Stop Comprehensive Sexuality Education (Stop CSE).

FWI produced a 2019 video claiming that a Tucson Unified School District comprehensive sex education program was a conspiracy to sexualize children for profit. A crowd of Tucsonians who had watched the video spoke against the "homosexual agenda" at a school board meeting. FWI organized a similar crowd at a 2021 Nebraska State Board of Education meeting; the event made headlines when one opponent of sex education, Sam Schlegal, appeared to threaten the board with a violent insurrection similar to the 2021 United States Capitol attack.

FWI runs a group called Protect Nebraska Children Coalition, which has over 19,000 members on Facebook as of 2021. The group is opposed to critical race theory, LGBT protections, COVID vaccines and masks.

Ethiopian surgeon Seyoum Antonios, the African director of FWI, created a viral video in 2020 that was part of the Stop CSE campaign. The video warned that Ethiopia would face the wrath of God unless it accepted that homosexuality is unnatural.

== Strategy and views ==
FWI supports the criminalization of homosexuality in Africa and in the United States. It opposes the repeal of American sodomy laws. In Nigeria, where homosexual behavior is punishable by up to 14 years in prison and by stoning in northern Nigeria, Slater opposes efforts to remove these punishments. She refers to legalizing LGBT relationships as "fictitious sexual rights."

Reverend Kapya John Kaoma considers FWI part of colonialism in Africa, through which the American Christian right works to globalize the American culture wars and to expand its power on African soil. Psychologist Warren Throckmorton writes that "the activities of FWI reveal a very uncomplicated, black-and-white strategy: laws opposing homosexuality in any form should be retained, while those which might provide basic freedoms to gays are opposed as bad for everybody else." He observes that FWI fights ideological battles in Africa and at the UN that American religious conservatives have largely lost in their home country.

== See also ==
- United Families International
- Nebraska Family Alliance
