= Scott Lively =

American activist, author, and attorney (born 1957)

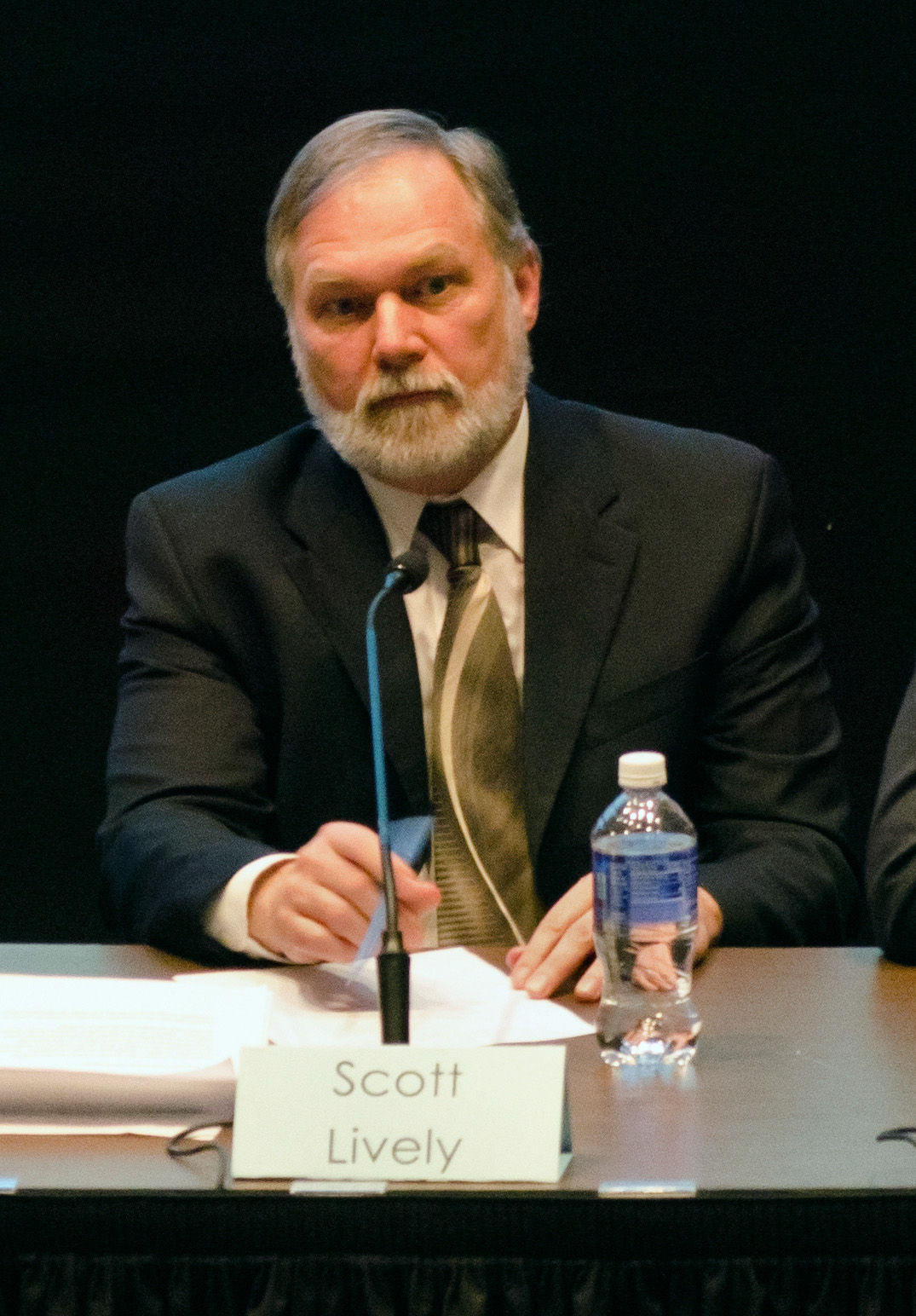
- Lively in 2014
- Born: Scott Douglas Lively; December 14, 1957 (age 68); Shelburne Falls, Massachusetts, U.S.
- Occupations: Author, attorney, pastor and activist
- Known for: Anti-gay activism
- Political party: Republican
- Spouse: Anne Gardner
- Children: 4

Scott Douglas Lively (born December 14, 1957) is an American activist, author, and attorney, who is the president of Abiding Truth Ministries, an anti-LGBTQ group based in Temecula, California. He was also a cofounder of Latvia-based group Watchmen on the Walls, state director of the California branch of the American Family Association, and a spokesman for the Oregon Citizens Alliance. He unsuccessfully ran to be the governor of Massachusetts in both 2014 and 2018.

Lively has promoted a hardline anti-gay interpretation of the Bible, been involved in the ex-gay movement, and been staunchly opposed to LGBTQ rights. In 1995, he co-authored The Pink Swastika, a book claiming gay people were prominent in the Nazi Party and were behind Nazi atrocities. He has called for the criminalization of "the public advocacy of homosexuality" as far back as 2007. Widely credited as an engineer of Uganda's Anti-Homosexuality Act, 2014, he gave a series of talks to Ugandan lawmakers before the drafting of the Act.

== Background ==
Lively was born and raised in the town of Shelburne Falls, Massachusetts, the oldest of six children. He became an alcoholic at the age of 12, an addiction he explains as a means to cope with an unhappy family situation. When Lively was 16, his father was committed to a mental institution, never to return. After graduating from high school in 1976, Lively spent the next 10 years "drifting around the United States, often homeless, sometimes sleeping under bridges and begging for spare change on street-corners." Lively has stated in his autobiography: "I visited every one of the 48 continental states and logged over 25,000 miles by thumb, bus and train in my wandering. I didn't learn to drive a car until I was 25."

Lively states that he became a born-again Christian on February 1, 1986, while staying at an alcohol treatment facility in Portland, Oregon, of which he has said, "It was a miracle which completely removed my desire for alcohol and drugs—something I had been unable to do for myself over several years of a desperate futile struggle to find some way to freedom."

Lively attended Western Baptist College and graduated with a B.S. in 1995. He later graduated from Trinity Law School with a J.D. in 1999.

== Political candidacies ==
Lively was an independent candidate for Governor of Massachusetts in the 2014 election.

He ran again as a Republican candidate in the 2018 election. At the Massachusetts Republican Party's state convention on April 28, 2018, he received support from nearly a third of the delegates present, exceeding the minimum requirement to appear on the ballot for the primary election on September 4, challenging fellow GOP incumbent Charlie Baker. Lively lost the primary to Baker, with Lively receiving 36.1% support (98,214 out of 271,990 votes cast) and Baker the remaining 63.9%.

== Activities ==
=== Anti-abortion activism ===
In 1988, Lively began campaigning against abortion in Portland. In 1989, he became a spokesman for the Oregon Citizens Alliance and worked on the anti-abortion ballot measure for the 1990 United States midterm elections.

=== Anti-homosexuality activism in the United States ===
In 1991, Lively, together with Oregon Citizens Alliance, shifted focus from abortion to homosexuality citing the "rapid advance of that agenda in Oregon". In 1991, Lively assaulted Catherine Stauffer, throwing her against a wall and dragging her across the floor of a Portland church, at an Oregon Citizens Alliance event she had been trying to film. In 1992 he was found liable for damages in excess of $31,000.

Lively is the president of Abiding Truth Ministries, a conservative Christian organization based in Temecula, California which is listed by the Southern Poverty Law Center as an anti-gay hate group.

=== Anti-homosexuality activism in Latvia and Russia ===
In 2006, Lively met with Latvian pastor Alexey Ledyaev to form an international anti-gay organization called Watchmen on the Walls, which the Southern Poverty Law Center has dubbed a hate group. Lively spent the summer of 2006 lecturing at Latvian universities and meeting with lawmakers, and preached at Ledyaev's New Generation church. During Lively's speaking engagements, he claimed that Western activists (backed by the European Union) were trying to infiltrate Latvian society and spread homosexuality, particularly to children.

After his trip to Latvia, Lively then embarked on a fifty-city tour of Russia and other former Soviet republics, sponsored by Ledyaev's church, which had roughly 200 congregations and a regional TV channel. As Lively traveled from the Baltics to Siberia, he pressed officials to outlaw the "public advocacy of homosexuality" and urged officials from passing anti-discrimination laws. Eight of the nine countries he visited eventually weighed nationwide bans on "homosexual propaganda," and five (including Russia) either have bills pending or have since passed them into law. Lively takes partial credit for this development and calls Russia's gay propaganda ban his "proudest accomplishment."

In 2007, Lively wrote a Letter to the Russian people in which he advocated criminalizing "the public advocacy of homosexuality".

On August 30, 2013, in response to anti-LGBTQ legislation in Russia, Lively wrote an open letter addressed to Vladimir Putin saying, "You have set an example of moral leadership that has shamed the governments of Western Europe and North America and inspired the peoples of the world."

Lively appeared on Russian television channel Russia-1's documentary titled Sodom in September 2014.

=== Anti-homosexuality activism in Uganda ===
In March 2009, Lively, along with evangelical activists Don Schmierer and Caleb Lee Brundidge, arrived in Kampala to give a series of talks. "The theme of the event, according to Stephen Langa, its Ugandan organizer, was "'the gay agenda—that whole hidden and dark agenda'—and the threat homosexuals posed to Bible-based values and the traditional African family." Lively gave a lengthy presentation to members of Uganda's parliament and cabinet, in which he laid out the argument that the nation's president and lawmakers would later use to justify Uganda's anti-gay crackdown; namely that Western agitators were trying to unravel Uganda's social fabric by spreading "the disease" of homosexuality to children.

"[T]housands of Ugandans, including police officers, teachers and national politicians", reportedly attended the conference. Lively and his colleagues "discussed how to make gay people straight, how gay men often sodomized teenage boys, and how 'the gay movement is an evil institution' whose goal is 'to defeat the marriage-based society and replace it with a culture of sexual promiscuity.'" He asserted that the 1994 Rwandan genocide "probably" involved gay men whom he referred to as "monsters." Lively wrote days later that "someone had likened their campaign 'to a nuclear bomb against the gay agenda in Uganda.'"

The talks inspired the development of the Uganda Anti-Homosexuality Act, a private member's bill, proposed in the Ugandan parliament. The bill, submitted in November 2009, called for the death penalty in some cases, and was harshly criticized in the international community.

Lively expressed disappointment that "the legislation was so harsh." "Lively says he recommended an approach rooted in rehabilitation, not punishment, and says an anti-gay bill being considered by the Ugandan Parliament goes too far", even though he himself is not opposed to criminalizing homosexuality:

[M]y advice to the parliament was to go the other direction from what they did to actually go on a proactive positive message promoting the family, promoting marriage, et cetera, through the schools, and that if they were going to continue to criminalize homosexuality that they should focus on rehabilitation and not punishment. And I was very disappointed when the law came out as it is written now with such incredibly harsh punishments.

Lively has stated that he will endorse the bill if the death penalty is removed.

In March 2010, Lively wrote:

In my view, homosexuality (indeed all sex outside of marriage) should be actively discouraged by society—but only as aggressively as necessary to prevent the mainstreaming of alternative sexual lifestyles, and with concern for the preservation of the liberties of those who desire to keep their personal lifestyles private. Marriage-based culture served humanity very favorably during the centuries when homosexuality was disapproved but tolerated as a sub-culture in America, England and elsewhere. It has obviously not fared well in the decades since the so-called sexual revolution kicked open Pandora's Box and unleashed both rampant heterosexual promiscuity and "Gay Pride" on the world.
In March of this year I had the privilege of addressing members of the Ugandan parliament in their national assembly hall when the anti-homosexuality law was just being considered. I urged them to pattern their bill on some American laws regarding alcoholism and drug abuse. I cited my own pre-Christian experience being arrested for drunk driving. I was given and chose the option of therapy which turned out to be one of the best decisions of my life. I also cited the policy in some U.S. jurisdictions regarding marijuana. Criminalization of the drug prevents its users from promoting it, and discourages non-users from starting, even while the law itself is very lightly enforced, if at all.

=== Lawsuit by Sexual Minorities Uganda v Scott Lively ===
On March 14, 2012, the Center for Constitutional Rights filed a federal lawsuit against Lively on behalf of a gay rights group, Sexual Minorities Uganda, under the Alien Tort Statute. The lawsuit accused Lively of violating international law by conspiring to persecute the Ugandan LGBTQ community. This first-of-its-kind lawsuit alleged that Lively's actions over the previous decade, in collaboration with some Ugandan government officials and Ugandan religious leaders, were responsible for depriving LGBTQ Ugandans of their fundamental human rights based solely on their identity; the lawsuit alleged that this fell under the definition of persecution under international law and was a crime against humanity. Lively was to answer the allegations under the Crime Against Humanity of Persecution. He has portrayed the Ugandan LGBTQ movement as "pedophilic" and "genocidal" and linked it "to the Nazis and Rwandan murderers". Regarding the allegations of violating international law, he said, "That's about as ridiculous as it gets. I've never done anything in Uganda except preach the Gospel and speak my opinion about the homosexual issue."

Pam Spees, a staff attorney for the Center for Constitutional Rights, said, "This is not just based on his speech. It's based on his conduct. Belief is one thing, but actively trying to harm and deprive other people of their rights is the definition of persecution."

On August 14, 2013, an American federal judge ruled that the case against Scott Lively, by the Center for Constitutional Rights (CCR) on behalf of Sexual Minorities Uganda (SMUG), a Uganda-based coalition of LGBTQ rights and advocacy groups, could move forward. U.S. District Court Judge Michael Ponsor rejected the defendant's jurisdictional claims to dismiss the case, ruling that the plaintiffs were on solid ground under international and federal law and that First Amendment arguments were "premature".

In December 2014, the First Circuit Court of Appeals rejected another petition to dismiss the case.

In the summer of 2016 the case continued and a summary judgement hearing before Judge Ponsor was scheduled for September 14, 2016 in Springfield, Massachusetts.

In June 2017, Ponsor dismissed the case due to lack of jurisdiction, citing the 2013 U.S. Supreme Court decision in Kiobel v. Royal Dutch Petroleum Co.

=== Reactions ===
Lively is listed in the Southern Poverty Law Center's "Extremist Files", which describes him as "actively propagandizing against LGBT people since the early 1990s." Abiding Truth Ministries has been listed by the Southern Poverty Law Center as an anti-gay hate group. Lively has, in turn, accused the SPLC of "hypocrisy and anti-Christian extremism". The American Family Association, the California branch of which Lively has directed, is also regarded by the Southern Poverty Law Center as a hate group.

Susan Ryan-Vollmar, a communications consultant and a former newspaper editor, wrote on the day after the September 2018 primary that Gov. Baker's "unspoken strategy for dealing with Lively throughout the primary was to ignore him." Neither was there, she said, a significant "local outcry" against Lively's candidacy.

=== Shift to anti-poverty activism ===
According to a January 2011 profile, Lively "has not changed his view that gays are 'agents of America's moral decline,' but he has refocused his approach to fit his parishioners in Springfield, Massachusetts", and "is toning down his antigay truths and shifting his focus to helping the downtrodden."

== The Pink Swastika ==
Kevin E. Abrams and Lively co-authored The Pink Swastika (1995). Abrams and Lively state in the preface that "homosexuals [are] the true inventors of Nazism and the guiding force behind many Nazi atrocities."

The premise of Lively and Abrams' book has been criticized as a "pernicious myth", "utterly false", "a flat-out lie", and several historians have questioned Abrams and Lively's claims and selective use of research.

== Personal life ==
Lively is married to Anne Gardner and has four children.

== Political views ==
In 2020, Lively claimed Donald Trump lost the election because he is pro-LGBTQ.

== Publications ==
- The Pink Swastika: Homosexuality in the Nazi Party (1996)
- Seven Steps to Recruit-Proof Your Child: A Parent's Guide to Protecting Children from Homosexuality and the "Gay" Movement (1998)
- Why and How to Defeat the "Gay" Movement (2000)
- Redeeming the Rainbow: A Christian Response to the "Gay" Agenda (2009)

== See also ==
- 2014 Massachusetts gubernatorial election
