= Americans for Truth about Homosexuality =

American advocacy organization

- Logo
- Founded: 1996
- Founder: Peter LaBarbera
- Tax ID no.: 54-1829289 (EIN)
- Purpose: "To expose the homosexual activist agenda"
- Location: Naperville, Illinois
- Revenue: $110,000 (2009)
- Website: americansfortruth.com

Americans for Truth about Homosexuality (AFTAH) is an organization which describes its mission as "exposing the homosexual activist agenda". AFTAH rejects the idea that sexual orientation is innate and believes that people can "leave the homosexual lifestyle". AFTAH contends that there is a fundamental conflict between gay rights and religious freedom. The Southern Poverty Law Center (SPLC) designated it as an anti-LGBT hate group.

== History ==
AFTAH was formed as a part-time enterprise in 1996 to oppose the "radical homosexual agenda." It was reorganized in 2006 by Peter LaBarbera. It was a 501(c)(3) United States tax-exempt organization until stripped of that designation in 2010, following years of failing to file the appropriate paperwork. AFTAH's tax exempt status was reinstated in 2012 but again revoked in 2015.

AFTAH is notable for using discredited work of Paul Cameron of the Family Research Institute which claims that gays and lesbians live vastly shorter lives than heterosexuals.

== Activism ==
In 1997, LaBarbera, then an editor for the Family Research Council, criticized US President Bill Clinton for supporting the Employment Non-Discrimination Act (ENDA) stating: "He's out there using his presidential power to boost the gay lobby. I think there is an increasing acceptance [of homosexuality], but the majority of Americans are put off by the kind of homosexual advocacy they are seeing."

In 2009, AFTAH filed a lawsuit in US federal court against a Naperville, Illinois, Holiday Inn Select, because of the cancellation of a banquet the AFTAH planned to hold October 6, 2007, at the hotel. The hotel cancelled the AFTAH event after learning that it would likely draw protests from the Chicago-based Gay Liberation Network. That same year, LaBarbera, while speaking at the Reclaiming Oklahoma for Christ Conference, called for a government study of the dangers of homosexual sex.

== Criticism ==
In 2010, AFTAH was designated as an anti-gay hate group by the Southern Poverty Law Center (SPLC) for spreading "hateful propaganda", and claiming that homosexuality can be "cured".

== See also ==
- Parents Action League
- Heterosexuals Organized for a Moral Environment
- List of organizations designated by the Southern Poverty Law Center as anti-gay hate groups
