= Parents Action League =

Organization in Minnesota, United States

- Abbreviation: PAL
- Formation: 2010; 16 years ago
- Type: Citizens Organization
- Legal status: ad hoc
- Location: Champlin, Minnesota
- Region served: Anoka-Hennepin (Minnesota) School District 11
- President: Laurie Thompson
- Spokesperson: Barb Anderson
- Member: Bryan Lindquist
- Member: Mike Skaalerud
- Affiliations: Minnesota Family Council
- Website: parentsactionleague.org

Parents Action League (PAL) is a citizens organization started in 2010 to oppose changes in the Anoka-Hennepin (Minnesota) School District 11 policy which limited discussions of lesbian, gay, bisexual, and transgender (LGBT) issues in district classrooms. PAL's roots go back as far as 1994, when one of its most-vocal members, Barb Anderson, successfully influenced the school district's board to exclude homosexuality from its sex-ed curriculum.

The school district abandoned the 2010 policy following several student suicides, lawsuits and investigation by the U.S. Department of Justice. The Southern Poverty Law Center designated Parents Action League as an "anti-gay hate group" for "damaging propaganda about the gay community".

== Background ==
Between 2009 and 2011, nine students in Anoka-Hennepin committed suicide; the area is designated by state health officials as a "suicide contagion area". At least four of these students identified as gay or were perceived by their classmates to be gay, leading to bullying. The district is the subject of a federal investigation by the U.S. Department of Justice and the Office for Civil Rights in the U.S. Department of Education over the climate of anti-gay harassment and discrimination based on sex, including peer-on-peer harassment based on not conforming to gender stereotypes.

The district received criticism for its Sexual Orientation Curriculum Policy because it stated that teachers should be neutral when addressing issues of sexual orientation in their classrooms. Critics said this "neutrality policy" prevented acceptance and open discussion of LGBT people and issues in schools, and was essentially a "gag order" on teachers. The "neutrality policy" as it was called, allows teachers to address LGBT issues in the classroom but forbids them from staking out positions on such issues. The policy was characterized as contributing to the harassment and bullying of LGBT students. Advocates for the students charged that several student suicides in the district have been linked to such harassment, and they want the policy repealed. The controversy escalated into lawsuits and a federal investigation. District administration attempted to clarify the policy by explaining its anti-bullying and harassment policies specifically name sexual orientation as a protected class of people. The Sexual Orientation Curriculum Policy stated teachers can address issues of sexual orientation in their classes provided the discussion is age-appropriate, fact-based and connected to the curriculum.

== History ==
=== Origins ===
The Minnesota Family Council is the statewide sponsor of the Parents Action League (PAL). PAL member Barb Anderson, a former district Spanish teacher and a longtime researcher for the Minnesota Family Council, fought "gay influence" in local schools for two decades. When the Anoka-Hennepin district's sex-ed curriculum was due for re-evaluation in 1994, Anderson and four like-minded parents joined the review committee. They argued against teaching gay tolerance in school, suggesting that it would "promote homosexuality", and that discussing it openly might actually "turn straight kids gay".

At the end of the committee's seven-month-long sex-ed review, Anderson and her colleagues wrote to the Anoka-Hennepin school board, concluding, "The majority of parents do not wish to have their children taught that the gay lifestyle is a normal acceptable alternative." The school board voted to adopt the measure by a four-to-two majority, using language from the committee's memo to create a district-wide policy. The policy prohibited homosexuality to be taught as a "normal, valid lifestyle", within the health curriculum. The policy was unofficially known as the "No Homo Promo". Teachers said it had a chilling effect and they became concerned about mentioning gays in any context. Gradually discussion of homosexuality disappeared from classes.

=== Petition ===
In 2011, the Parents Action League circulated an online petition supporting the Anoka-Hennepin school district's sexual orientation curriculum policy, which has been challenged by advocates for LGBT students. The School district has disclaimed connection with the outside group.

As part of their list of demands to the school district, members of PAL included "incorporating ex-gay (conversion therapy) into the school resources." They specifically called for a new division within the student support services and a special section on the District 11 website devoted to "students of faith, moral conviction, ex-homosexuals and ex-transgenders". They also asked for school administrators and staff work closely with "pro-family and ex-homosexual and ex-transgender organizations", and for the district to provide information on the history of "Gay-related immune deficiency (GRID), acquired immune deficiencies and the medical consequences of homosexual acts". As a result of their activities, PAL was scrutinized by other parents who questioned the group’s ties to the Minnesota Family Council.

Alert To Parents/Citizens In Anoka-Hennepin School District #11!

Do you want your tax dollars used to promote a radical homosexual agenda in our public schools?

On February 9, 2009 the Anoka-Hennepin District #11 School Board passed the Sexual Orientation Curriculum Policy (Neutrality Policy). This policy makes it clear that “Teaching about sexual orientation is not a part of the District adopted curriculum; rather, such matters are best addressed within individual family homes, churches, or community organizations. Anoka-Hennepin staff, in the course of their professional duties, shall remain neutral on matters regarding sexual orientation including but not limited to student-led discussions.”

This policy strengthens the authority and rights of parents to direct the upbringing and education of their own children—especially on sensitive topics such as sexual orientation. The Gay Equity Team and other radical homosexual activists in our school district are fighting to overturn this policy.

— Parents Action League Flyer (2011)

=== Repeal ===
On February 13, 2012, the policy was repealed and replaced by a vote of 5-1 with a new Respectful Learning Environment Policy. The old policy was repealed because the US Department of Justice "agreed with the crux of the lawsuit -- that the neutrality policy and the policies that preceded contributed to harassment of gay kids" including six bullied gay students (including one who committed suicide). The new policy requires teachers to discuss contentious issues in a way that "shall affirm the dignity of all students."

=== Political reaction ===
PAL's controversial role influencing the school district's Sexual Orientation Curriculum Policy caught the attention of civil rights groups as well as the national media, in part because its influence occurred within the 2012 presidential contender Michele Bachmann's home district and because the Parents Action League is a local affiliate of the Minnesota Family Council, one of Michele Bachmann's largest supporters in the district. Bachmann and Newt Gingrich were both headline speakers at a fundraiser for PAL's statewide sponsor, Minnesota Family Council.

== Hate group designation ==
The Southern Poverty Law Center (SPLC) has designated the Parents Action League as an anti-gay hate group. SPLC's Heidi Beirich said "the Parents Action League was included on their hate list for 'damaging propaganda about the gay community,' including calling gays and lesbians 'promiscuous, dysfunctional, unhealthy'." The SPLC noted for groups including Parents Action League, "viewing homosexuality as unbiblical does not qualify organizations for listing as hate groups." She added that they studied the behaviour of the Parents Action League before adding them the list.

Parents Action League president Laurie Thompson, in email, did not respond directly to the SPLC accusations but did pose "pointed questions": "How does being pro family/pro parental rights constitute a group as a hate group?" and, "How does being an advocate for parental rights to raise their children come off as being hatred?" Thompson also said: "It is a privilege to be added to the long list of pro-family organizations that have been labeled as 'hate groups'. The SPLC continues their strategy of defaming and name calling toward those whom they disagree with."

In 2015 the alt-weekly City Pages reported on the SPLC's Hate Map of Minnesota, noting some of the disparate and random designations. In the article it described PAL as "Michele Bachmannesque", and suggested it was increasingly unsuccessful in its campaigns. The paper also noted the stagnant website that had not updated in over 2 years at the time.

== See also ==
- Heterosexuals Organized for a Moral Environment
- List of organizations designated by the Southern Poverty Law Center as anti-gay hate groups
- Suicide among LGBTQ people
