= MassResistance =

US anti-LGBT activist group

- Founded: May 8, 1995
- Founder: Brian Camenker
- Type: Political activist
- Tax ID no.: 04-3271722 (EIN)
- Location: Waltham, Massachusetts
- Key people: Brian Camenker, President
- Revenue: $137,953 (2010)
- Website: massresistance.org
- Formerly called: Parents' Rights Coalition; Article 8 Alliance

MassResistance is an American organization that promotes anti-LGBT and socially conservative positions. The group is designated an anti-LGBT hate group by the Southern Poverty Law Center, in part for claims linking LGBT people with pedophilia and zoophilia, and claims that suicide prevention programs aimed at gay youth were created by homosexual activists to normalize and "lure" children into homosexuality.

The group's activism takes several forms, including promoting its views via its website, blog, email, lobbying, and voters' guides. It has also provided support for anti-gay activism in foreign countries such as Taiwan and Australia. In 2026, MassResistance backed anti-LGBTQ legislation in Senegal and Ghana.

MassResistance was founded by Brian Camenker in 1995 as the Parents' Rights Coalition, and in 2003 it changed its name to Article 8 Alliance. It adopted its current name, MassResistance, in 2006.

== History ==
Brian Camenker, a conservative activist in Massachusetts, founded Parents' Rights Coalition in 1995. The name was changed to Article 8 Alliance in 2003 and then to its current name, MassResistance, in 2006. The organization is based in Waltham, Massachusetts.

=== Origins ===
Camenker's vocal opposition to "the homosexual agenda" began in 1992, when his neighbor showed him a teaching guide that contained what he characterized as "disgusting descriptions of gay sex". Camenker was one of several parents who expressed concern to the Newton school committee about a pamphlet provided to teachers for use as background material at Newton's Day Junior High School. The pamphlet listed graphic tips on subjects including safe sex for lesbians. A short while later, Camenker founded a conservative organization, Newton Citizens for Public Education (NCPE), which opposed a controversial ninth-grade sex education program in Newton. Camenker was accused by Massachusetts Board of Education chairman Martin Kaplan of having ties with Christian right organizations. Following a vote by the Board of Education that recommended support groups for LGBT students, Camenker expressed concern about harassment of gay students, but stated that direction being taken would "cause more acrimony rather than less". He added, "People should view gays as friends, as Americans, rather than as someone who's different than them".

=== Parents' Rights Coalition ===
Camenker formed the Parents' Rights Coalition on May 8, 1995. That same year, Camenker, heading the Massachusetts Interfaith Coalition, sponsored a bill in Massachusetts requiring school officials to notify parents about sex-education courses. The bill, if passed, would give parents the option to remove their children from those classes.

MassResistance has promoted its platform through media appearances and lobbying for laws related to parental rights in public schools. The bills that have been submitted on behalf of MassResistance in the past several years have been consistently rejected by the Joint Judiciary Committee.

Parents' Rights Coalition opposed a Massachusetts public school teacher reading of King & King, a fairy tale involving two married men, to kindergartners. In 2006, they alleged that the school violated a law requiring the school to inform parents of all sex-ed-related material. The lawsuit has since been thrown out of Federal Court.

=== Hate group designation ===
Since March 2008, the Southern Poverty Law Center (SPLC) has listed MassResistance as an active anti-gay hate group.

In 1996 MassResistance's leader, Brian Camenker claimed that suicide prevention programs aimed at gay youth were "put together by homosexual activists to normalize homosexuality". MassResistance also asserted that groups such as the Gay, Lesbian and Straight Education Network (GLSEN), which support school anti-bullying programs, actually want to "lure children into homosexuality and, very possibly, sadomasochism".

MassResistance has also insisted that gays were "trying to get legislation passed to allow sex with animals", later adding, "They [gays and lesbians] are pushing perversion on our kids".

MassResistance has claimed that "gays are dangerous to kids", and have made comments regarding "skyrocketing homosexual domestic violence" and called a gay pride event a "depraved" display that featured "a great deal of obviously disturbed, dysfunctional, and extremely self-centered people whose aim was to push their agenda".

=== Political involvement ===
In March 2012, MassResistance president Brian Camenker and the anti-gay organization, Jews and Christians Together, jointly made a series of pre-recorded telephone calls endorsing U.S. presidential candidate Rick Santorum and opposing U.S. presidential candidate Mitt Romney for the Ohio "Super-Tuesday" Republican primary.

A few days after the calls were broadcast, MassResistance's website stated: "As the 2012 presidential primary races are heating up, MassResistance is being called on to expose an important issue that the mainstream media (even Fox News) won't talk about. Millions of emails and robo-calls with MassResistance's information went to voters in key states leading up to Super Tuesday, which likely made a difference, say activists".

=== Criticism of FBI and CIA ===
In 2012 MassResistance publicly criticized the FBI and CIA for "embracing the homosexual movement". Camenker is critical of the FBI's LGBT program promoted on the FBI's careers website, as well as their involvement with the Southern Poverty Law Center (SPLC) and the CIA's Agency Network of Gay, Lesbian, Bisexual and Transgender Employees and Allies (ANGLE).

According to MassResistance, the FBI actively recruits homosexual and transgender employees and agents. MassResistance is especially critical of the FBI's "outrageous" official partnership with the SPLC.

== Positions ==
MassResistance has maintained conservative social positions on "hot-button" issues such as abortion, assisted suicide, homosexual and transgender rights, gun control, marriage, and other issues. The group monitors changes to LGBT rights legislation in countries as far away as Australia, but focuses most of its efforts on the United States, and especially in Massachusetts.

=== Abortion ===
MassResistance has expressed strong opposing views about Mitt Romney for his moderate policies on abortion. During Romney's term as governor of Massachusetts, MassResistance criticized him for his stance on abortion, referring to him as "probably the most pro-abortion and pro-gay rights Republican official in the nation for the last decade".

In 2012 MassResistance opposed the nomination of Kenneth Salinger to the Massachusetts Superior Court by Governor Deval Patrick, citing Salinger's activist agenda and financial contributions to MoveOn.org and pro-abortion group EMILY's List. MassResistance gave a presentation at a conference hosted by Phyllis Schlafly's Eagle Forum. Camenker spoke to U.S. Representative Todd Akin during the conference, and reflected later on how he "gets it" and how thrilled he was to meet and speak "with a smart, principled, pro-life, pro-family Congressman". After Todd Akin's televised interview in August 2012 in which he claimed that women victims of what he described as "legitimate rape" rarely experience pregnancy from rape and the ensuing backlash, MassResistance commented that "Todd Akin misspoke during a lengthy interview and then apologized and clarified his statement. Given his record, that should be the end of it".

=== Same-sex marriage ===
MassResistance has always maintained staunch opposition to same-sex marriage. In its booklet, What same-sex 'marriage' has done to Massachusetts, Camenker characterizes acceptance of same-sex marriage as "a hammer to force the acceptance and normalization of homosexuality on everyone". The organization objects to schools teaching children that same-sex marriages are a normal part of society. They cite "radical" activist judges and "cowardly" politicians as factors in the increasing acceptance of same-sex marriage, and warn the public to fight back.

Massachusetts has permitted same-sex marriage since 2004, and MassResistance has continued to oppose it through political activism. In October 2008, MassResistance mounted a petition campaign for a ballot referendum to reinstate a recently repealed 1913 law to deny Massachusetts marriage licenses to same-sex couples who reside in states that do not recognize same-sex marriage. It failed to gather a sufficient number of signatures.

In June 2024, Uncloseted Media published a multi-part investigative series examining MassResistance's tactics, messaging, and outreach efforts. The series highlighted the group's use of emotionally charged rhetoric and graphic imagery in educational materials, as well as their connections with other far-right organizations in the U.S. and abroad. One article also detailed the group's attempts to influence school board elections and public comment sessions by mobilizing affiliated activists to flood local meetings with scripted talking points.

The reporting prompted responses from civil rights organizations, with the Human Rights Campaign (HRC) calling it “a disturbing but critical exposé” on the strategies used to undermine LGBTQ+ protections in education.

In 2025, MassResistance supported North Dakota Bill Tveit Resolution 3013, which called for the U.S. Supreme Court to overturn Obergefell v. Hodges .

=== Anti-bullying ===
MassResistance has voiced objections to anti-bullying efforts in Massachusetts, including anti-bullying legislation, in part because of concern that it could "silence criticism of the gay movement". They criticized Mitt Romney's support of the Massachusetts Commission on Gay and Lesbian Youth. MassResistance has characterized efforts to prevent bullying as "a very aggressive, fascist-type movement".

According to MassResistance, the "homosexual anti-bullying agenda" is exploiting the legitimate problem of school bullying, with the aim of pushing "homosexual-normalization propaganda" at children.

Testifying at a Joint Committee on Education hearing in 2009 that was considering nearly a dozen bills that would address bullying, Brian Camenker of MassResistance "claimed supporters had been brought in by 'special-interest groups' with a gay-rights agenda". In its written testimony, MassResistance stated that it had filed bill H.1059 in the Massachusetts Legislature to repeal the anti-bullying law that the commission was addressing. The testimony suggested adopting a student-run approach to anti-bullying in schools, and concluded that the anti-bullying law was onerous and costly, and should be repealed in favor of a top-down, school-directed solution. It went on to say that homosexual activist groups were behind the law and that the Anti-Defamation League (ADL) had diverged from its role of fighting anti-Semitism.

=== Transgender identity and rights ===
MassResistance opposes laws prohibiting discrimination on the basis of gender identity.

On Nov. 6, 2018, Massachusetts voters preserved an existing nondiscrimination law by passing the Massachusetts Gender Identity Anti-Discrimination Initiative with 68% of the vote, that protects the right of people to access public accommodations based on the gender with which they identify. MassResistance had campaigned unsuccessfully with "highway standouts, leafletting, and some public debates" to strike down the law. The organization posted an article several days later criticizing the campaign efforts.

== Activities ==
=== Fistgate ===
In 2000 members of the Parents' Rights Coalition attended a statewide conference, called "Teach-Out", that was sponsored by the Massachusetts Department of Education, the Governor's Commission on Gay and Lesbian Youth, and the Gay, Lesbian and Straight Education Network, held at Tufts University.

One student asked about fisting and was provided with an explanation. MassResistance dubbed the incident "Fistgate" after one of its members "secretly recorded the workshop". A state employee who participated in the discussion filed suit against Camenker and Scott Whiteman as a result of the distribution of the tape recordings. According to Bay Windows, a "Massachusetts Superior Court judge ruled that the tape was illegally acquired and therefore an invasion of privacy against those individuals present, who were never told they were being recorded." Greg Carmack suggested that the question might have been planted by those making the recordings.

=== Disorderly conduct ===
In October 2008, MassResistance employee Michael Olivio was arrested for disorderly conduct at a school after parents became concerned about his taking many pictures of their children. When questioned by police, he explained that he was filming footage for a documentary, but mistook an elementary school for a high school. When asked by police to leave, Olivio began to "act erratically"; he "ran through yards [...] shedding clothing". Camenker supported Olivio's statement that he was working for the MassResistance, but went to the wrong school.

=== Criticism of Mitt Romney ===
Camenker first voiced concerns about Mitt Romney in 1994, when Romney unsuccessfully ran for U.S. Senate on a platform supporting gay rights and abortion rights. According to Camenker, "Romney is a RINO, a Republican In Name Only".

In April 2006, MassResistance tried to pressure Romney into ending a state advisory commission on LGBT youth. Romney instead ordered the commission to focus on suicide prevention among gay and lesbian teens.

In November 2006, Camenker released a 28-page report critical of Romney's sympathetic positions on gay rights and portraying him as a social liberal. The report focused on Romney's term as governor of Massachusetts and his peripheral involvement with social issues such as gay rights and abortion. Camenker wrote that "the biggest problem is that Romney is so clearly and blatantly faking this. He's a fraud", suggesting that Romney was merely pandering to special interests.

In January 2007, Romney's campaign issued a press release critical of Camenker for MassResistance's "Mitt Romney Deception" report. Romney's campaign removed the press release from its site, but MassResistance continued to display it on their own site, and they issued their own press release as well. Romney responded in defense of his conservative record as governor that he was "as staunch a defender as anyone in the country" of traditional marriage, and opposition to abortion and stem cell research.
