= Heterosexuals Organized for a Moral Environment =

Anti-LGBTQ hate group

- Heterosexuals Organized for a Moral Environment
- Founded: 1990; 36 years ago
- Founder: Wayne Anthony Lela
- Type: Nonprofit
- Purpose: Opposing homosexuality
- Location: Downers Grove, Illinois
- Method: Web site and flyers
- Key people: John McCartney
- Website: home60515.com

Heterosexuals Organized for a Moral Environment (HOME) is an American pro-heterosexuality, anti-homosexuality organization founded by Wayne Lela and based in Downers Grove, Illinois. The organization's aim is "to use science, logic, and natural law to expose all the flaws in the arguments homosexuals (and bisexuals) use to try to justify homosexual activity". The organization has been designated an anti-LGBTQ hate group by the Southern Poverty Law Center "based on their propagation of known falsehoods".

== Background ==
HOME's main goal is to foster heterosexuality, oppose LGBT rights, and criminalize homosexual relations. The group claims that if homosexuality remains legal, then "necrophilia and pedophilia may become legal activities".

According to their web site, the group supports the idea that "penalizing people for engaging in homosexual behavior is clearly not discrimination, just like penalizing people for exhibitionism or incest is not discrimination", adding that "heterosexual activity is not illegalizeable ... while homosexual activity is definitely illegalizeable". HOME believes that gays should apologize "for all the STDs (sexually transmitted diseases) they've spread, and all the money those STDs have cost". HOME also makes a connection between Freemasonry and homosexual sex, positing that Masons may be using their power and influence to spread homosexual values, and linking Masonic rites with homosexual sex.

== History ==
Heterosexuals Organized for a Moral Environment (HOME) was founded in 1990 by Wayne Lela, a former Catholic and now self-described agnostic.

=== Activism ===
Since 2002, Elgin Community College (ECC), in Elgin, Illinois has permitted HOME to set up a booth on the campus once each semester. The college in no way supports or agrees with the message delivered by this group. It is in direct opposition to the shared values of the college.

In 2004, their presence on the campus caused mixed reactions from students and faculty. In response, Carole Akeman, managing director of planning and marketing for ECC, said that it is likely that the college will revisit the decision to allow HOME to continue setting up a booth on the campus, "as the school's primary concern is to provide a safe environment for its students. This is obviously in conflict with our zero-tolerance policy on discrimination."

In 2005, Weissman Jordan of the Daily Northwestern wrote that HOME distributed flyers on the Northwestern University campus, and that most students accepted the fliers and threw them in a nearby trash can.

In 2006, Joliet Junior College required HOME's founder, Wayne Lela, to use a remote free speech zone. Lela commented that "you could be standing out there with all kinds of fliers and you're not going to see anybody unless they go significantly out of their way."

In 2007, students at the University of Chicago protested against Lela, who was distributing flyers denouncing homosexual behavior.

=== Hate group designation ===
On November 22, 2010, the Southern Poverty Law Center (SPLC) designated the Heterosexuals Organized for a Moral Environment (HOME) as an anti-gay hate group "based on their propagation of known falsehoods". According to the SPLC, Heterosexuals Organized for a Moral Environment "is entirely focused on the alleged evils of homosexuality [and] attacks gay people on a wide variety of levels".

== See also ==
- List of organizations designated by the Southern Poverty Law Center as anti-gay hate groups
- Parents Action League
