= Family Research Institute =

American socially conservative non-profit organization

- Family Research Institute Logo
- Founded: 1982
- Founder: Paul Cameron
- Type: Nonprofit
- Tax ID no.: EIN 470649778
- Purpose: Research
- Location: Colorado Springs
- Method: [data missing]
- Key people: Paul Cameron, Chairman; Kirk Cameron, Vice Chairman
- Revenue: $70,629 (2010)
- Website: familyresearchinst.org
- Formerly called: Institute for the Scientific Investigation of Sexuality

The Family Research Institute (FRI), originally known as the Institute for the Scientific Investigation of Sexuality (ISIS), is an American socially conservative non-profit organization based in Colorado Springs, Colorado, which states that it has "...one overriding mission: to generate empirical research on issues that threaten the traditional family, particularly homosexuality, AIDS, sexual social policy, and drug abuse". The FRI is part of a sociopolitical movement of socially conservative Christian organizations which seek to influence the political debate in the United States. They seek "...to restore a world where marriage is upheld and honored, where children are nurtured and protected, and where homosexuality is not taught and accepted, but instead is discouraged and rejected at every level." The Boston Globe reported that the FRI's 2005 budget was less than $200,000.

The FRI is led by Paul Cameron, who received a doctorate in psychology from the University of Colorado at Boulder in 1966. Cameron founded the Institute for the Scientific Investigation of Sexuality in 1982, and this institute later became the FRI.

The Family Research Institute has been designated an anti-gay hate group by the Southern Poverty Law Center since 2006 because of Cameron's discredited research and claims about LGBT people.

== History ==
=== Founding ===
FRI (known then as ISIS) was founded in 1982 in Lincoln, Nebraska, by psychologist Paul Cameron. In 1980, a local organization, the Lincoln Legion of Lesbians, had asked the Lincoln city government to outlaw discrimination based on sexual orientation. Cameron was vehemently opposed to legal protections for gay people, and presented his opposition as grounded in his psychological research. The opposition organization he formed was successful not only in defeating the proposed law, but in quickly becoming a major part of the nationwide anti-LGBT movement.

=== AIDS epidemic ===
Sociologist Sara Diamond of UC Berkeley states that the AIDS epidemic gave FRI a chance to oppose gay rights using "fear-mongering pseudoscience" before accurate scientific understanding of AIDS could be communicated to the public. Among other proposals, FRI advocated limiting AIDS by imprisoning "sexually active homosexuals" in concentration camps.

The organization's name was changed to the current one in 1987. It moved to Colorado Springs in 1992.

=== Reactions ===
In 1984, the Nebraska Psychological Association adopted a resolution stating that it "formally disassociates itself from the representations and interpretations of scientific literature offered by Dr. Paul Cameron in his writings and public statements on sexuality."

In 1986, the American Sociological Association (ASA) passed a resolution condemning Cameron for "consistent misrepresentation of sociological research" based on a report from the ASA's Committee on the Status of Homosexuals in Sociology, which summarized Cameron's inflammatory statements and commented, "It does not take great analytical abilities to suspect from even a cursory review of Cameron's writings that his claims have almost nothing to do with social science and that social science is used only to cover over another agenda. Very little of his work could find support from even a bad misreading of genuine social science investigation on the subject and some sociologists, such as Alan Bell, have been 'appalled' at the abuse of their work." In 1996, the board of directors of the Canadian Psychological Association approved a position statement disassociating the organization from Cameron's work on sexuality, stating that he had "consistently misinterpreted and misrepresented research on sexuality, homosexuality, and lesbianism".

Herek and others have also said that the FRI's research has been published in Psychological Reports. The Boston Globe says that the small journal charges authors to publish their studies, and that it has a non-standard peer-reviewing policy. Herek says that it has a "low rejection rate" and that Cameron's research "would have been rejected by more prestigious scientific journals"

=== Decline ===
The Christian right began to distance itself from FRI and Cameron in the mid-1990s. His acrimonious attacks on gays and lesbians were backfiring, according to journalist Wayne Besen; his attacks were responsible for a growing impression that Christianity was intolerant, and his claims appeared further removed from the truth as public understanding of AIDS grew. Focus on the Family denounced FRI, and moved on to associate itself with other pseudoscientific claims, such as conversion therapy, instead. However, FRI's claims are still cited in politics as of 2020.

== Hate group designation ==
The Southern Poverty Law Center has listed FRI as an anti-gay hate group because of Cameron's discredited research and claims about LGBT people. According to the SPLC, Cameron's "continued demonization of LGBT people and the shoddy and suspect research methods he uses to advance his claims have earned his Family Research Institute (FRI) a place on the SPLC's anti-LGBT hate group list."

According to political scientist Barry J. Balleck, FRI continues to publish "pseudoscientific studies" as of 2019 that, Balleck says, "remain central to anti-LGBT groups on the extreme right of the political spectrum." Organizations that cite FRI's pseudoscientific research include the American Family Association, Coral Ridge Ministries, Concerned Women for America, Americans for Truth About Homosexuality, the Family Research Council. The Illinois Family Institute has also cited FRI's research, but no longer does.

== See also ==
- List of organizations designated by the Southern Poverty Law Center as anti-gay hate groups
