= Family values =

Cultural values based on traditional family structures

Family values, sometimes referred to as familial values, are moral, ethical, and cultural principles associated with family life and with relationships and responsibilities within families. The term commonly refers to values traditionally taught or reinforced within families and, particularly in conservative usage, to values considered to promote the functioning of the family and social cohesion.

In political thought, familialism gives priority to family and family values and advocates that families, rather than the government, take responsibility for the care of their members. In the United States and the United Kingdom, family values has been used by rightward political coalitions in support of socially conservative positions concerning abortion, sexuality, marriage, gender, and secularism. American conservative and nationalist groups have also promoted such policies in Africa under the description of African family values. Conceptions of family values vary across cultural contexts, including in expectations surrounding marriage, extended-family relationships, parental roles, and care for relatives.

== Definition ==
Several online dictionaries define "family values" as the following:

- "the moral and ethical principles traditionally upheld and passed on within a family, as fidelity, honesty, truth, and faith."
- "values especially of a traditional or conservative kind which are held to promote the sound functioning of the family and to strengthen the fabric of society."
- "values held to be traditionally taught or reinforced within a family, such as those of high moral standards and discipline."

== In politics ==
Familialism or familism is the ideology that puts priority on family and family values. Familialism advocates for a welfare system where families, rather than the government, take responsibility for the care of their members.

In the United States and the United Kingdom, the banner of family values has been used by rightward political coalitions to express opposition to abortion, birth control, environmentalism, feminism, pornography, comprehensive sex education, divorce, LGBTQ, same-sex marriage, civil unions, so-called "gender ideology", secularism, and atheism. American conservative and nationalist groups have made inroads promoting these policies in Africa since the early 1990s, describing them as African family values.

The phrase family values originated with the 1992 Republican National Convention, for their "Family Values Night", featuring Barbara Bush as the keynote speaker. In the short term the phrase was widely panned, and at the time the staying power of the idea was underestimated.

== Family values by region ==
=== Arab culture ===
Interpretations of Islamic learnings and Arab culture are common for the majority of Saudis. Islam is a driving cultural force that dictates a submission to the will of Allah. The academic literature suggests that the family is regarded as the main foundation of Muslim society and culture; the family structure and nature of the relationship between family members are influenced by the Islamic religion. Marriage in Saudi culture means the union of two families, not just two individuals. In Muslim society, marriage involves a social contract that occurs with the consent of parents or guardians. Furthermore, marriage is considered the only legitimate outlet for sexual desires, and sex outside marriage (zina) is a crime that is punished under Islamic law.

The Saudi family includes extended families, as the extended family provides the individual with a sense of identity. The father is often the breadwinner and protector of the family, whereas the mother is often the homemaker and the primary caretaker of the children. Parents are regarded with high respect, and children are strongly encouraged to respect and obey their parents. Often, families provide care for elders. Until recently, because families and friends are expected to provide elderly care, nursing homes were considered culturally unacceptable.

=== American culture ===
In sociological terms, nontraditional families make up the majority of American households. As of 2014, only 46% of children in the U.S. live in a traditional family, down from 61% in 1980. This number includes only families with parents who are in their first marriage, whereas the percentage of children simply living with two married parents is 65% as of 2016.

==== Organizations ====
These US based organizations are associated with "family values". Many of them are also listed as hate groups by the Southern Poverty Law Center as a result of their anti-LGBT activism.

- American Family Association
- Family Research Council
- Family Research Institute
- Focus on the Family
- Traditional Values Coalition
- World Congress of Families

=== Japanese culture ===
Japanese gender roles have changed due to history and expectations. Due to gender roles' nuance, young Japanese women's experiences reveal societal attitudes, expectations, and gender inequality (Belarmino & Roberts, 2019).

History shapes Japanese expectations. Housework was done by women, while men worked. Although changed, Confucian and patriarchal expectations still affect gender dynamics (Belarmino & Roberts, 2019).

To balance Confucian values with a modernizing economy, the "good wife, wise mother" archetype replaced them in Japanese gender roles. Before post-World War II Western influence, women were mostly homemakers and childrearing with little political or higher education (Belarmino & Roberts, 2019).

A qualitative study of college-aged Japanese women reveals their values and customs. Interviewees thought Japanese women married, raised children, and supported men. Women identified with societal femininity and beauty standards through pressure. Japanese families and society expect women to marry and have children. Women are expected to marry, have children, and take care of their homes. While some valued education and work, society valued marriage and family more. Interpreting Japanese gender norms requires historical and contemporary contexts. Japanese women face gender inequality despite progress, requiring social discourse and reforms (Belarmino & Roberts, 2019).
