= Christian Coalition of America =

Religious non-profit organization

Coordinates: 32°58′N 80°02′W

- Abbreviation: CCA
- Founded: 30 April 1987 (39 years ago)
- Founder: Pat Robertson
- Type: Nonprofit
- Tax ID no.: 75-2372537
- Legal status: 501(c)(4)
- Location: North Charleston, SC, US
- President: Roberta Combs
- Secretary: Drew McKissick
- Finance director: Neal Meyer
- Revenue: $190,305 (2023)
- Expenses: $209,728 (2023)
- Employees: 0 (2018)
- Website: cc.org

The Christian Coalition of America (CCA) is an American 501(c)(4) non-profit organization that is the successor to the original Christian Coalition created in 1987 by religious broadcaster and former presidential candidate Pat Robertson. The advocacy group included members of various Christian denominations as of 1997, including Baptists (50%), mainline Protestants (25%), Roman Catholics (16%), and Pentecostals (10% to 12%) among communicants of other churches.

== History ==
=== Formation ===
On April 30, 1987, the Christian Coalition was incorporated in Richmond, Virginia. The following year, after a well-funded but unsuccessful campaign for President, Pat Robertson, a religious broadcaster and political commentator, used the remainder of his campaign resources to jump-start the formation of the Christian Coalition's voter-mobilization effort. Americans for Robertson accumulated a mailing list of several million conservative Christians interested in politics. This mailing provided the basis of the new organization.

The coalition had four original directors: Robertson, his son Gordon Robertson, Dick Weinhold, head of the Texas organization, and, Billy McCormack, pastor of the University Worship Center in Shreveport, Louisiana. McCormack had headed the Louisiana division of Americans for Robertson in 1988 and was also the vice president of the coalition.

After its founding, the Christian Coalition applied to become a tax-exempt charitable organization with the Internal Revenue Service. Forty-nine state chapters formed as independent corporations within their states, including the Christian Coalition of Texas. A handful, including the Christian Coalition of Texas, successfully obtained tax-exempt status as social-welfare organizations. After ten years, the Internal Revenue Service declined the Christian Coalition's application for charitable status because it engaged in political activities. In response, the Christian Coalition of Texas was renamed the Christian Coalition of America, and the organization relocated in order to work nationwide.

=== Voter guides ===
In 1990, the national Christian Coalition, Inc., headquartered in Chesapeake, Virginia, began producing non-partisan voter guides which it distributed to conservative Christian churches. Complaints that the voter guides were partisan led to the denial by the IRS of the Christian Coalition, Inc.'s tax-exempt status in 1999. Later that same year, the coalition prevailed in its five-year defense of a lawsuit brought by the Federal Election Commission.

Ralph Reed, an Emory University Ph.D. candidate, whom Robertson had met when the younger man was working as a waiter at an inaugural dinner for George H. W. Bush in January 1989, took control of day-to-day operations of the coalition in 1989 as its founding executive director. He remained in the post until August 1997 when he left to enter partisan political consulting, founding his new firm Century Strategies, based near Atlanta, Georgia.

=== Political involvement ===
Robertson served as the organization's president from its founding until June 1997, when President Reagan's Cabinet Secretary Donald P. Hodel was named president of the CCA, and former U.S. Representative Randy Tate (R-WA) was named executive director. Upon announcement of Hodel becoming president of the CCA, Robertson expressed a desire to serve the grassroots activists that made up the coalition.

Grover Norquist, Washington insider, president of Americans for Tax Reform, and an old Reed ally, said of the appointments: "What you've got is Reagan and Gingrich. Hodel is a Reagan Republican and Tate is a Gingrich Republican."

Late in 1997 the CCA was ranked by Fortune magazine as the 7th most powerful political organization in America.

After a disagreement with Robertson, Hodel left in January 1999 and Tate soon followed. Robertson took over the presidency. Later in 2001 he turned it and the chairmanship over to Roberta Combs, the group's executive vice president and former state chairman of South Carolina, when he officially left the coalition.

=== 2000s ===
In 2000, the coalition moved from Chesapeake, Virginia, to a large office on Capitol Hill in Washington, D.C. Combs is the current president and CEO of the Christian Coalition of America. She is a founding state director and has been the only woman on the board of directors in the history of the Christian Coalition of America. Since moving to the capital, Combs installed members of her family as high-ranking officials in the group, including her daughter Michele Ammons and son-in-law Tracy Ammons. Michele and Tracy Ammons later divorced. Combs fired her former son-in-law Tracy Ammons after her daughter received a judgement against him for alimony and child support. Combs had filed an affidavit on her behalf on Coalition letterhead.

Combs canceled a direct-mail fund-raising campaign run by fund-raiser Bill Sidebottom of Interact Response Communications aimed at fighting child pornography after a U.S. Supreme Court ruling. The cancellation of the campaign in the middle of its run led to nearly a dozen lawsuits by creditors and the bankruptcy of its fund-raising company. Without a fund-raising company supporting it, the Christian Coalition went into sharp decline financially.

In March 2001, the Christian Coalition of America was sued by its African-American employees, who alleged racial discrimination. The District Court issued an injunction against the Christian Coalition. The case was settled and the African-American plaintiffs received a payment.

In November 2002, Combs downsized the staff and moved the organization's offices from Washington, D.C., to a suburb of Charleston, South Carolina. The coalition reduced its lobbyists in Washington from a dozen to one. The Christian Coalition was later sued for $1,890 by Reese & Sons Enterprises of Maryland, the moving company it used for transporting its goods to South Carolina, because of failure to pay the wrapping and packing fee. The coalition lost in court in Richmond, Virginia, and finally paid the movers.

Other reported debts have been $69,729 owed to its longtime law firm, Huff, Poole & Mahoney PC of Virginia Beach, and Global Direct, a fundraising firm in Oklahoma, sued for $87,000 in expenses. From the time Robertson left the group in 2001 until 2006, the coalition's influence greatly declined. Revenue declined from a high of $26.5 million in 1996 to $1.3 million in 2004. The organization's 2004 income tax return showed the Christian Coalition to be technically bankrupt, with debts exceeding assets by more than $2 million.

In 2005, the coalition finally concluded a settlement agreement with the Internal Revenue Service, ending its long-running battle with that agency regarding its tax exempt status. As a result, the IRS has recognized the coalition as a 501(c)(4) tax-exempt organization, the first time in the agency's history that it has granted a letter of exemption to a group that stated in its application that it would distribute voter guides directly in churches. The consent decree enforces limitations on the terminology that may be used in the coalition's voter guides.

In late 2005, The Washington Post reported that the Christian Coalition was unable to pay its office postage bill to Pitney Bowes. In addition, it had not paid new lawyers in Virginia Beach; the law firm sued the coalition.

In March 2006, the Christian Coalition of Iowa renamed itself the Iowa Christian Alliance. In splitting from the national group, the Iowa Christian Alliance cited "the current problems facing the Christian Coalition of America". In August 2006, the Christian Coalition of Alabama split from the national group. It later renamed itself Christian Action Alabama.

In November 2006, the president-elect of the Christian Coalition of America resigned his post, citing a difference in philosophy over which issues the organization should embrace. Reverend Joel Hunter, currently the senior pastor of the Northland Church in Longwood, Florida, was to assume the presidency in January. However, Hunter stated the coalition's leaders resisted his calls to expand their issue base, saying it would not expand the agenda beyond opposing abortion and same-sex marriage. Hunter also said he wanted to focus on rebuilding the coalition's once powerful grassroots, an appeal he says board members rejected. "After initial willingness to consider these changes, the board of the CCA decided, 'that is fine, but that is not who we are'", Hunter said. Combs continues as the coalition's president.

As of December 31, 2018, the Christian Coalition reported that it had $274,920 of cash on hand, and that it owed $39,367. During 2018, it received $766,799 of contributions, and it had spent $133,000 on management; $7,500 on advertisement and promotion; $162,000 on conferences, conventions, and meetings; $29,500 on affiliate payments; and $133,418 on other expenses.

== See also ==
- Family Research Council
- Focus on the Family
