= Bill Tveit =

American politician

Member of the North Dakota House of Representatives from the 33rd district
- Incumbent
- Assumed office December 1, 2018
- Succeeded by: Mike Heger (elect)

Personal details
- Party: Republican
- Spouse: Laurel Tveit
- Children: 3

Bill Tveit is an American politician. He has been a Republican member of the North Dakota House of Representatives representing District 33 since December 1, 2018. Tveit is on the Agriculture and Human Services Committees.

== Politics ==
Tveit has sponsored numerous bills targeting LGBT people as part of the larger 2020s anti-LGBT movement. In January 2023, Tveit sponsored House Bill 1254, which sought to ban all forms of gender-affirming care for transgender minors and impose felony charges on doctors who perform transition-related surgeries. It passed the legislature and was signed into law by Governor Doug Burgum in April, drawing immediate condemnation from the Human Rights Campaign. This law caused North Dakota transgender youth to travel to Minnesota to receive healthcare; a group of families filed a lawsuit against HB1254 in September. During the 2023 legislative session, Tveit voted in favor of every anti-LGBTQ bill proposed, including bathroom bills, suggesting that school districts that ignore such laws should lose their state funding.

In 2025, Tveit sponsored Resolution 3013, which called for the U.S. Supreme Court to overturn Obergefell v. Hodges and define marriage as between a man and a woman. "As you are well aware, two cannot conceive or birth a child except for coming together of a female and a male," he said. "Based on the laws of nature, it’s just that simple," adding that they were welcome to call it a "collaborative union of a sort, or a legal bonding". The bill passed the House, 52 to 40, before it was killed in the Senate, despite receiving the support of MassResistance, an anti-LGBT hate group.

Tveit also introduced his own bathroom bill, House Bill 1144, which, among other things, bans all-gender bathrooms and allowed schools to be fined for noncompliance. The bill passed both the House and the Senate and was signed into law by Governor Doug Burgum on May 1.

== Personal life ==
Tveit is married to Laurel Tveit and has three children. He attended the North Dakota State College of Science. He has served in the army. He lives in Hazen, North Dakota.
