= Peter LaBarbera =

American journalist

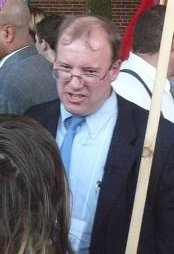
Peter LaBarbera

Peter LaBarbera (born 1963) is an American social conservative activist and the president of the anti-gay organization Americans for Truth about Homosexuality (AFTAH).

LaBarbera has been criticized for spreading hate speech and misinformation about homosexuality, with AFTAH being designated as an anti-LGBT hate group by the Southern Poverty Law Center (SPLC) for spreading "hateful propaganda".

== Biography ==
=== Career ===
LaBarbera was a reporter for The Washington Times until 1990 and covered stories such as communism in Central America, then became a freelance reporter in Nicaragua. He then worked for Accuracy in Media and became a contributing editor at Human Events.

In early August 1994, LaBarbera and another activist, Bill Horn, were invited to Shreveport, Louisiana, by pastor Billy McCormack (vice president of the Christian Coalition of America) to make a presentation on the homosexual rights agenda. Horn produced the video The Gay Agenda, and LaBarbera edited the newsletter, the Lambda Report. After LaBarbera and Horn left Shreveport, McCormack's University Baptist Church burned to the ground. Arson was suspected but authorities determined that the structure was destroyed by lightning.

LaBarbera served as a senior policy analyst for the Culture and Family Institute, a conservative Christian group opposed to LGBT rights. LaBarbera said that the result of Lawrence v. Texas was "like the Roe v. Wade of the homosexual issue."

In 2010, LaBarbera campaigned unsuccessfully to become a state central committeeman for the Republican Party in Naperville, Illinois, where he resides.

==== Americans for Truth about Homosexuality ====
LaBarbera is founder and president of Americans for Truth about Homosexuality (AFTAH), which describes itself as "dedicated to exposing the homosexual activist agenda". It was a 501(c)(3) United States tax-exempt organization until stripped of that designation following years of failing to file the appropriate paperwork. It is classified as an anti-gay hate group by the Southern Poverty Law Center (SPLC). Upon learning of the designation in December 2010, LaBarbera considered it a point of pride and stated "If you are not on the SPLC hate list, you are not doing enough." LaBarbera has stated that SPLC determinations that AFTAH makes false and derogatory claims about homosexuals is inaccurate.

In April 2013, he said that high incidents of "gay-on-gay violence" and higher rates of sexually transmitted infections among homosexuals were "reassuring" to his mission as it demonstrated that God saw homosexuality as an "abomination".

==== 2014 visit to Saskatchewan ====
In April 2014, LaBarbera's planned appearance in Weyburn, Saskatchewan, Canada at a Saskatchewan Pro-Life Association convention was met with controversy from residents. A group known as Intolerance Free Weyburn started a petition urging organizers to reconsider LaBarbera's involvement, and planned a protest at the event itself, citing AFTAH's history of anti-gay rhetoric, and for being designated as a hate group by SPLC. Despite receiving similar criticism in 2013 for inviting a speaker from Courage International to the convention, the decision was defended by the organization's president Marcy Mallette, who stated that "his website is for truth, and that's not hateful at all", but also went on to say that she "welcome[d] dialogue", given that "there's nothing worse than just being silent about everything." LaBarbera himself confirmed that he would still appear at the event, characterized the protest as a "homo-Marxist attempt to shut down my speech", and indicated that he was also looking forward to meet Bill Whatcott, a fellow anti-gay and pro-life supporter that he dubbed "the most fearless truth-teller" he had ever met, at the event as well. Debra Button, mayor of Weyburn, announced that she and her city council would consider pulling the CDN$1,000 in funding it had provided for the event in response to the controversy.

On April 10, 2014—two days before the conference, LaBarbera was denied entry into Canada by customs officials at Regina International Airport, arguing that his appearance at the event could violate Canadian laws on hate speech and "wilful incitement of hatred". He was detained for questioning by officials regarding his stance on homosexuality, his organization's ideologies, his purposes for attending the event, and his luggage and electronic devices were also inspected by officials. LaBarbera personally blamed the campaign of Intolerance Free Weyburn for the detention. He was released following an appeal with the Canada Border Services Agency the following morning. The following Monday, LaBarbera and Bill Whatcott visited the University of Regina, where they displayed anti-abortion posters and distributed pamphlets on the "evils" of homosexuality. They were both arrested after they refused to respond to requests by officials to leave the premises; Whatcott admitted that they had defied a formal denial of permission to set up a table at the university. They were both charged with mischief, and held in custody overnight. Both LaBarbera and Whatcott were released the following day, pending a trial on May 26. They also cancelled a planned appearance at the University of Saskatchewan, with LaBarbera choosing to head home to the United States.
