= Paul Cameron =

American psychologist and extremist (born 1939)

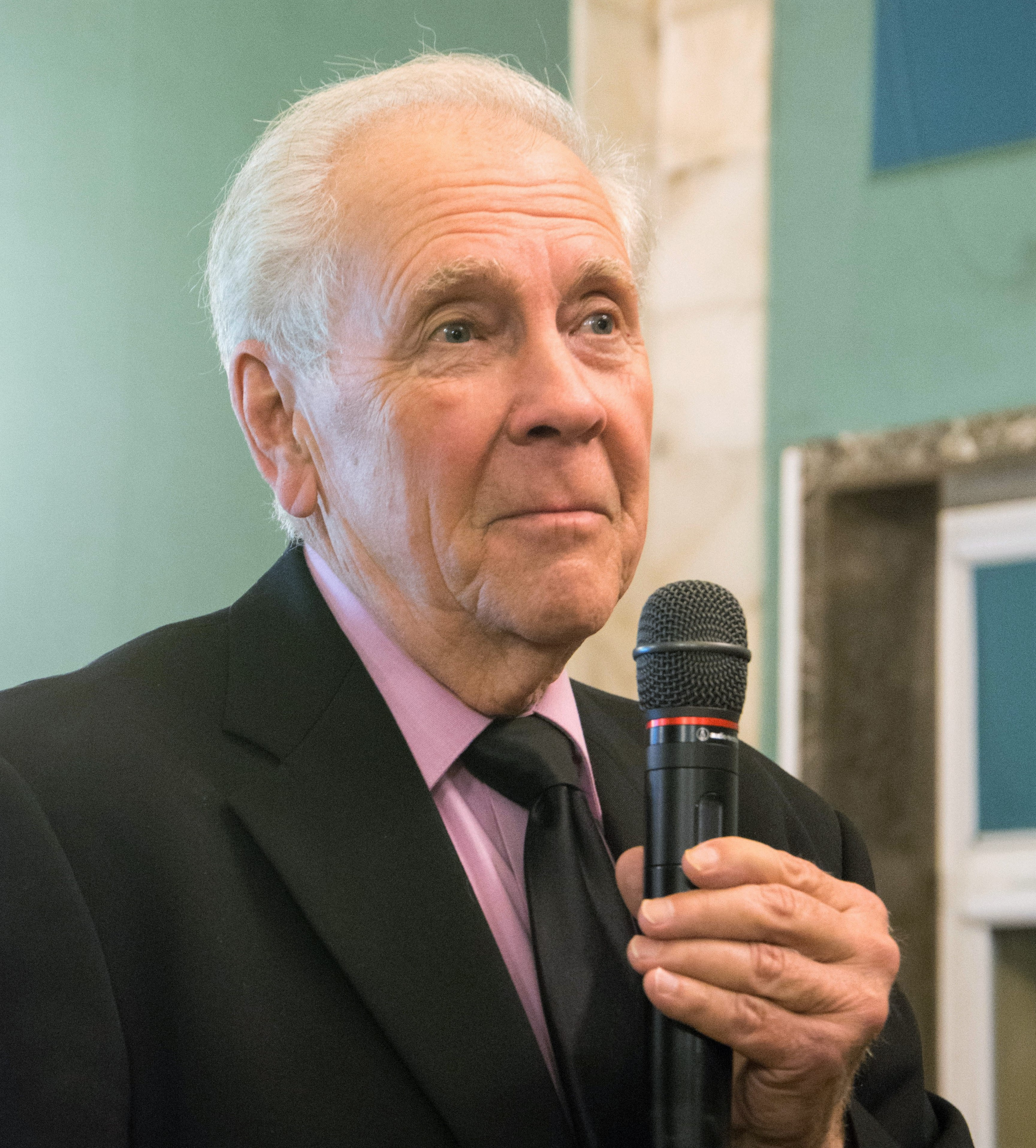
- Cameron lecturing in Kielce, 2019
- Born: Paul Drummond Cameron; November 9, 1939 (age 87); Pittsburgh, Pennsylvania, U.S.
- Education: Los Angeles Pacific College (BA); California State University, Los Angeles (MA); University of Colorado, Boulder (PhD)
- Scientific career
- Fields: Psychology
- Workplaces: Stout State University; Wayne State University; University of Louisville; Fuller Theological Seminary; University of Nebraska–Lincoln; Family Research Institute

Paul Drummond Cameron (born November 9, 1939) is an American psychologist. While employed at various institutions, including the University of Nebraska–Lincoln, he conducted research on passive smoking, but he is best known today for his claims about homosexuality. After a successful 1982 campaign against a gay rights proposal in Lincoln, Nebraska, he established the Institute for the Scientific Investigation of Sexuality (ISIS), now known as the Family Research Institute (FRI). As FRI's chairman, Cameron has written contentious papers asserting unproven associations between homosexuality and the perpetration of child sexual abuse and reduced life expectancy. These have been heavily criticized and frequently discredited by others in the field.

In 1983, the American Psychological Association expelled Cameron for non-cooperation with an ethics investigation and falsifying data to promote an anti-gay agenda. Position statements issued by the American Sociological Association, Canadian Psychological Association, and the Nebraska Psychological Association accuse Cameron of misrepresenting social science research. Cameron has been designated by the Southern Poverty Law Center as an anti-gay extremist.

== Biography ==
=== Early life and career ===
Cameron was born in Pittsburgh, Pennsylvania, U.S., on November 9, 1939. His family moved shortly afterwards to Florida. He received a BA from Los Angeles Pacific College in 1961, an MA from Los Angeles State College (now California State University, Los Angeles) the following year and a PhD from the University of Colorado at Boulder in 1966. He held posts as an assistant psychology professor at University of Wisconsin–Stout (1966–67) and Wayne State University (1967–68), before becoming an associate professor at the University of Louisville (1970–73) and the Fuller Graduate School of Psychology (part of the Fuller Theological Seminary) (1976–79). In 1979, he became an associate professor of Marriage and Family Therapy at the University of Nebraska–Lincoln.

During this period, Cameron conducted research on a variety of topics, including the effects of passive smoking and the relationship between pet ownership and happiness. In his 1978 book, Sexual Gradualism, he supported a middle ground between liberal and conservative Christian attitudes to sexuality, arguing that teenagers should avoid intercourse while experimenting with lower "levels" of sexual intimacy.

In 1980, Cameron left the University of Nebraska–Lincoln and took up private practice as a psychologist in Lincoln, Nebraska. In 1982, when the Lincoln city council asked residents to vote on a proposal to ban discrimination based on sexual orientation, Cameron led the opposition as chairman of the committee to Oppose Special Rights for Homosexuals. Despite his earlier moderate position on teenage relationships, Cameron had come to take a hard-line stance on the topic of homosexuality. He has stated that his approach, emphasizing the harms he believed to be caused by homosexual behavior and its acceptance, was influenced by his work on the "lethal" behavior of smokers.

During the campaign in Lincoln, Cameron delivered a speech at the University of Nebraska–Lincoln Lutheran chapel. This drew much attention after he stated that a four-year-old boy had suffered a brutal homosexual assault in a local mall. Police were unable to confirm the incident, and Cameron acknowledged that he had heard the story only as a rumor. On May 11, Lincoln voters rejected the proposed measure by a 4–1 margin.

=== Family Research Institute ===
In 1982, Cameron co-founded the Institute for the Scientific Investigation of Sexuality in Lincoln. Believing that earlier sex surveys, including those conducted by Playboy magazine, had overestimated the prevalence of homosexuality, Cameron set out in 1983 to conduct what he described as "a fair sexuality poll, not one based on volunteers." His expectation was that the results would support his case for a ban on homosexual acts throughout the United States. Funding, according to Cameron, was provided by businessmen including several Nebraska chief executives. The 1983 ISIS Survey, an "extensive self-administered questionnaire", was offered to 9,129 adults in five U.S. cities, and 4,340 responses were received. In 1984, these were supplemented with data from 824 adults from Dallas. Under the banner of ISIS, Cameron produced a number of "lurid pamphlets about the supposed social ills associated with homosexuality", containing numerous false or unverifiable claims.

ISIS was shortly afterwards renamed the Family Research Institute (FRI) and moved to Washington, D.C. In 1995, FRI changed location again, this time to Colorado Springs, Colorado, where it remains based. In his capacity as FRI's chairman, Cameron has authored pamphlets and scientific articles on the topic of homosexuality. The cover photograph for Cameron's pamphlet Child Molestation and Homosexuality depicted "a young boy being pulled into a men's bathroom," while Murder, Violence and Homosexuality showed "a little girl cowering beneath an arm wielding an ax." Many of Cameron's scientific articles have been based on the 1983–1984 ISIS survey, including a 1996 paper that concluded based on participants' answers concerning their teachers that homosexual teachers could influence their students to become homosexual.

Another of Cameron's conclusions, based partly on his studies of obituaries in gay newspapers, is that homosexuals as a group have a median age of death about 20 years lower than that of heterosexuals. After analyzing official data from Denmark, which allowed same-sex unions in 1989, and Norway, which allowed same-sex marriage in 2009, Cameron reported in 2007 that "married lesbians lived to age 56 and married gay men to age 52." Cameron states that many victims of child sexual abuse are the same sex as their abusers – one FRI study on sexual abuse by foster parents in Illinois reported that 34% of perpetrators were guilty of same-sex abuse – and concludes that "there is a strong, disproportionate association between child molestation and homosexuality."

Cameron has asserted that 75 percent of gay men regularly ingest feces and that 70 to 78 percent have had a sexually transmitted disease, that all are promiscuous, and that homosexuals commit proportionately more homicides than non-homosexuals. He has been quoted in Rolling Stone as saying that homosexual sex was more pleasurable than most heterosexual sex, and as a result, if homosexuality were tolerated then it would become predominant within a few generations.

Cameron's publications have been cited as support by some groups who oppose same-sex marriage and allowing homosexuals to become foster or adoptive parents, including the Traditional Values Coalition. Cameron testified in the case Baker v. Wade (1985). In 1992, Gale Norton, then the Attorney General of Colorado, employed Cameron as a consultant when defending a law preventing the extension of civil rights legislation to homosexuals. Cameron's testimony went unused, and the law was struck down by the Supreme Court. Cameron campaigned against a gay-rights initiative in Maine in 2000, testified in favor of the failed Virginia Anti-Gay Adoption Bill in 2005, and opposed a 2007 Colorado bill intended to allow cohabiting couples to adopt. He was tricked into appearing in Sacha Baron Cohen's 2009 mockumentary film Brüno. Southern Poverty Law Center has classed the Family Research Institute as a hate group.

=== Family ===
Cameron is married and has three children. His son, Kirk (not to be confused with the actor of the same name), has been involved with the Family Research Institute since 1983.

== Criticism ==
=== From professional organizations ===
The American Psychological Association (APA) launched an investigation into Cameron after receiving complaints about his work from members. The APA President Max Seigel sent Cameron a letter on December 2, 1983, stating that the Board of Directors had decided to drop him from membership for failure to cooperate with their investigation. FRI has contended that Cameron had already resigned from the organization in November 1982, citing correspondence from before his formal expulsion. In a letter published in the March 1983 edition of the APA Monitor, Cameron stated that his reasons for leaving included his opinion that the organization was becoming more of a "liberal PAC" than a professional society. The APA, however, does not allow the resignation of a member who is the subject of an ethics investigation. An APA spokesperson told The Boston Globe in 2005, "We are concerned about Dr. Cameron because we do believe that his methodology is weak."

In 1984, the Nebraska Psychological Association issued a statement disassociating itself "from the representations and interpretations of scientific literature offered by Dr. Paul Cameron." In 1986, the American Sociological Association passed a resolution stating, "The American Sociological Association officially and publicly states that Paul Cameron is not a sociologist, and condemns his consistent misrepresentation of sociological research." This was based on a report from the ASA's Committee on the Status of Homosexuals in Sociology, which summarised Cameron's inflammatory statements and commented, "It does not take great analytical abilities to suspect from even a cursory review of Cameron's writings that his claims have almost nothing to do with social science and that social science is used only to cover over another agenda. Very little of his work could find support from even a bad misreading of genuine social science investigation on the subject and some sociologists, such as Alan P. Bell, have been 'appalled' at the abuse of their work." In 1996, the board of directors of the Canadian Psychological Association approved a position statement disassociating the organisation from Cameron's work on sexuality, stating that he had "consistently misinterpreted and misrepresented research on sexuality, homosexuality, and lesbianism." Cameron responded to the Nebraska Psychological Association's resolution, arguing that it was based on organizational opinion and not accompanied by peer-reviewed refutation. He reiterated this in a 1994 publication addressing multiple professional disassociations. In March 2015, Cameron sued the Polish gay rights organisation 'Pracownia Różnorodności' for calling him a 'homophobic liar'.

=== From individuals ===
After Cameron submitted affidavits to the U. S. District Court of Dallas in Baker v. Wade (1985), Judge Buchmeyer wrote in his opinion that Cameron had engaged in "fraud" and "misrepresentations to this Court" noting that, "His sworn statement that 'homosexuals are approximately 43 times more apt to commit crimes than is the general population' is a total distortion of the Kinsey data upon which he relies – which, as is obvious to anyone who reads the report, concerns data from a non-representative sample of delinquent homosexuals (and Dr. Cameron compares this group to college and non-college heterosexuals)." Buchmeyer's decision was reversed by the Fifth Circuit on other grounds, without mentioning Buchmeyer's finding that Cameron had made misrepresentations. FRI has disputed Judge Buchmeyer's assessment of Cameron's affidavits.

Epidemiologists Morten Frisch and Henrik Brønnum-Hansen argue that Cameron was wrong to infer reduced life expectancy from the fact that deaths among homosexually married partners in Denmark and Norway occurred at a lower median age than those among heterosexually married partners: "Because the age distribution among persons in same-sex marriages was considerably younger than that of people who had ever been heterosexually married, the average age at death among those who actually died during the observation period was, not surprisingly, considerably younger in the population of same-sex married persons." Their own analysis found that excess mortality in Danish same-sex marriages since 1995 was "restricted to the first few years after a marriage, presumably reflecting preexisting illness at the time of marriage". Similarly, critics have argued that obituaries in gay-themed newspapers, which Cameron used to estimate homosexual mortality, do not provide a representative sample of deaths and ignore surviving members of the same generation.

Cameron has also been criticized for placing responsibility for same-sex child sexual abuse on "homosexuals"; Scientists say someone who carries out such abuse need not have a homosexual orientation with respect to other adults. Gregory M. Herek, a psychologist specializing in prejudice against sexual minorities, charges that Cameron misrepresented the literature he had reviewed and cited to support his claims, such as a Groth and Birnbaum (1978) study in which none of the participating child molestors actually identified as homosexuals, and none of those who were bisexual claimed to prefer men over women. Furthermore, while Cameron assumed all the same-sex molestations were perpetrated by homosexuals, he did not assume all the opposite-sex molestations were perpetrated by heterosexuals; he included a "bisexual correction" only for opposite-sex molestations that effectively increased the number of perpetrators described as "homosexual" without changing the number described as "heterosexual".

Herek noted that most of the Cameron group's academic publications in the past 15 years have been based on a survey study conducted in 1983 and 1984. The main survey was completed in seven U.S. cities and towns in 1983. Data were later added from a 1984 Dallas (TX) sample. Most of the Cameron group's papers have reported data from the combined samples. According to Herek, a critical review of the Cameron group's sampling techniques, survey methodology, and interpretation of results reveals at least six serious errors in their study. Herek concludes, "an empirical study manifesting even one of these six weaknesses would be considered seriously flawed. In combination, the multiple methodological problems evident in the Cameron group's surveys mean that their results cannot even be considered a valid description of the specific group of individuals who returned the survey questionnaire. Because the data are essentially meaningless, it is not surprising that they have been virtually ignored by the scientific community." "The Cameron group has published its empirical research in academic journals with low prestige and, at least in the case of Psychological Reports, with a low rejection rate. Other than the Cameron group itself, researchers have not cited their empirical studies as a source of ideas for new research on sexual orientation. Nor have scientists cited the group's papers to support assertions about the dangers to society posed by homosexuals."

In a widely publicized interview with Midweek Politics with David Pakman, Cameron compared homosexuality to drug use, a comparison that drew criticism from several gay rights blogs, websites, and The Huffington Post.

=== Claims of linkage between homosexuality and child sex abuse ===
Cameron's claim of homosexuals being more apt to sexually abuse and molest children rests on the fallacious assumption that for all children who are sexually molested or abused by the perpetrators of the same sex as that of the victim, the perpetrators are homosexuals who are mainly attracted to adults of the same sex. While any coercive sex between an adult and a minor of the same sex is a homosexual act, the conclusion that the perpetrator is a homosexual in orientation towards adults is not necessarily correct. (See page 62 of ref) James Cantor mentions that the extremist groups take advantage of confusing terminologies. Pedophilia is primary sexual attraction towards children. whereas teleiophilia refers to sexual attraction towards adults. Homosexuality or homosexual in the context of pedophilia refers to homosexual pedophiles (those who are primarily sexually attracted to children of the same sex), whereas homosexuality or homosexuals in the context of civil rights or equality or prevalence of homosexuality in the general population refers to homosexual teleiophilia (those who are attracted towards adults of the same sex). Analogous terms like heterosexual pedophilia and heterosexual teleiophilia are also present. Some literature uses the term "androphiles" for sexual attraction towards adult males (homosexual teleiophile males and heterosexual teleiophile females), whereas the term gynephiles is used for sexual attraction towards females (homosexual teleiophile females and heterosexual teleiophile males). These terminologies are well accepted in the scientific community. It is known that the fraction of male homosexual pedophiles among male pedophiles is considerably more than the fraction of male homosexual teleiophiles among male teleiophiles. However, competent scientific studies have documented that it is not sensible to compare homosexual pedophiles with homosexual teleiophiles. Homosexual teleiophiles are not any more likely to sexually abuse children than heterosexual teleiophiles. Scientific, medical and psychiatric bodies across the world do not consider homosexuality to be a disease or a particular risk factor for physically or sexually abusive behavior, and advocate acceptance of LGBT citizens.

Cameron has misinterpreted some scientific literature which he says supports the idea that homosexuals are more likely to molest children. Freund et al. 1992 state that while fraction of male homosexual pedophiles among male pedophiles is considerably more than fraction of androphile males (homosexual teleiophile males) among teleiophile males, these findings would not imply that androphilic males (homosexual teleiophiles) have more propensity to sexually abuse children than gynephilic males (heterosexual teleiophiles), the conclusion which runs contrary to Cameron's understanding. Another paper from Archives of Sexual Behavior by Erickson et al. 1988 has been misinterpreted by Cameron. The paper found that roughly 70% of child sex offenders had abused girls, 25% had abused boys and 5% had abused both. Over 86% of those who had offended against boys were homosexual (i.e. around 26% of total child sex offenders). However what Cameron misses is that the keywords provided by authors in the same paper include homosexual pedophilia and pedophilia. The paper is speaking about homosexual pedophiles It does not have homosexual teleiophilia or androphilia (sexual attraction towards adult males) in its keywords. Usage of homosexuality/homosexuals in context of pedophilia to refer to homosexual pedophiles (which has nothing to do with adult sexual orientation) is widely prevalent in scientific literature. Nicholas Groth wrote a letter to Nebraska Board of Examiners of psychologists on August 21, 1984, and accused him of misrepresentation of his own work and disgracing his profession.

Apart from self-citations by Cameron's group their work on linking homosexuality with child sex abuse have mostly been cited by other scientists either to counteract it or only to quantify the prevalence of sexual abuse of children by adults of same sex. While sexual abuses in which the perpetrator and victims are of same sex are termed as homosexual molestation but it does not necessarily mean that the perpetrator was homosexual in orientation towards adults. Cameron's work on this topic have not influenced scientific consensus on absence of harms possessed by homosexuals to children and society.

== Works ==
- Cameron, Paul (1977). The Life Cycle: Perspectives and Commentary. Oceanside, NY: Dabor Science Publications. ISBN 0-89561-057-4.
- Cameron, Paul (1978). Sexual Gradualism: A Solution to the Sexual Dilemma of Teen-agers and Young Adults. Sun Valley, CA: HumLife Publications. OCLC 5028575.
- Cameron, Paul (1988). Exposing the AIDS Scandal. Lafayette, LA: Huntington House. ISBN 0-910311-52-8.
- Cameron, Paul (1993). The Gay 90s: What the Empirical Evidence Reveals about Homosexuality. Franklin, Tenn.: Adroit Press. ISBN 1-884067-01-8.
