= List of organizations designated by the SPLC as hate groups =

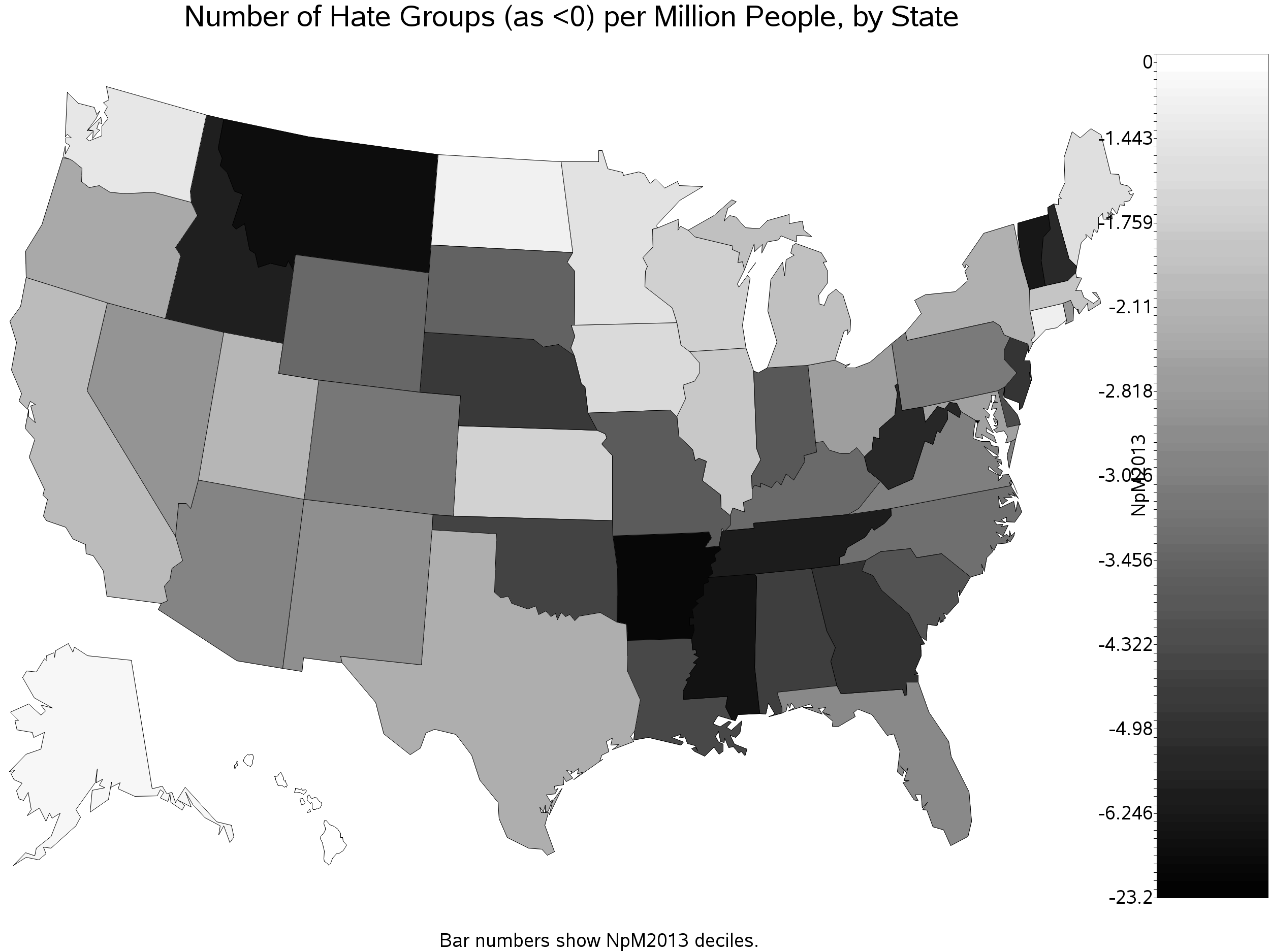
Number of SPLC hate groups per million, as of 2013

The following is a list of U.S.-based organizations that the Southern Poverty Law Center (SPLC) classifies as hate groups. The SPLC is an American nonprofit legal advocacy organization specializing in civil rights and public interest litigation. The SPLC defines a hate group as "an organization that — based on its official statements or principles, the statements of its leaders, or its activities — has beliefs or practices that attack or malign an entire class of people, typically for their immutable characteristic." The SPLC states that "Hate group activities can include criminal acts, marches, rallies, speeches, meetings, leafleting, or publishing" and adds that inclusion on its hate-group list "does not imply that a group advocates or engages in violence or other criminal activity."

Since 1981, the SPLC's Intelligence Project has published a quarterly Intelligence Report, which monitors hate groups and extremist organizations in the United States. The SPLC began an annual census of hate groups in 1990, releasing this census as part of its annual Year in Hate & Extremism report. The SPLC listed 1,020 hate groups and hate-group chapters on its 2018 list—an all-time high fueled primarily by an increase in radical right groups. In 2024, SPLC designated 533 hate groups and 838 hard-right anti-governmental groups.

The Intelligence Report provides information regarding the organizational efforts and tactics of these groups, and it is cited by a number of scholars as a reliable and comprehensive source on U.S. hate groups. The SPLC also publishes the HateWatch Weekly newsletter, which documents racism and extremism, and the Hatewatch blog.

== Historical trends ==
In 1999, the SPLC listed 457 hate groups; that number steadily increased until 2011, when 1,018 groups were listed. The rise from 2008 onward was attributed in part to anger at Barack Obama, the first black president of the United States. Thereafter, the number of hate groups steadily dropped, reaching a low of 784 in 2014 (a 23% drop). However, between 2014 and 2018, the number of hate groups skyrocketed 30%, reaching 892 in 2015; 917 in 2016; 954 in 2017; 1,020 in 2018; and 940 in 2019. According to Mark Potok at the SPLC, Donald Trump 2016 presidential campaign speeches containing "demonizing statements about Latinos and Muslims have electrified the radical right, leading to glowing endorsements from white nationalist leaders such as Jared Taylor and former Klansman David Duke." The relative strengths of hate groups have varied over time. For example, the Ku Klux Klan has markedly declined, while other white supremacist groups have substantially strengthened. In February 2018, the SPLC reported that black nationalist groups expanded to 233 chapters in the United States, up from 193 the previous year. The SPLC attributed this growth to a reaction to the mainstream rise of the alt-right, "the latest incarnation of white supremacy", along with the election of Trump as president. During the same year, neo-Nazi groups grew from 99 to 121, and anti-Muslim groups increased from 101 chapters to 114. Ku Klux Klan groups, meanwhile, fell from 130 groups to 72.

In 2024, the SPLC listed 533 organizations as active hate groups, categorized by type, as follows: anti-immigrant (17), anti-LGBTQ+ (96), anti-Muslim (31), antisemitic (14), Christian identity (41), general hate (76), hate music (10), Ku Klux Klan (14), male supremacy (16), neo-Confederate (4), neo-Nazi (61), neo-Völkisch (49), racist skinhead (10), radical traditional Catholicism (8), white nationalist (118). They also identified 838 antigovernmental groups.

Pundits, politicians, and some of the designated groups have objected to the SPLC's list. The Family Research Council disputed its designation in 2010, and the Center for Immigration Studies disputed the SPLC anti-immigrant designation in 2016. In January 2019, Center for Immigration Studies filed a lawsuit against the SPLC over the designation, which was dismissed in September 2019. The SPLC's hate group listings have also been criticized by some political observers and prominent Republicans.

== Hate and extremist groups by type ==
=== Ku Klux Klan ===
Number of Klan groups listed over time
| Year | Number listed |
|---|---|
| 1990 | 28 |
| 2010 | 221 |
| 2013 | 163 |
| 2014 | 72 |
| 2015 | 190 |
| 2016 | 130 |
| 2017 | 72 |
| 2018 | 51 |
| 2019 | 47 |
| 2020 | 25 |
| 2021 | 18 |
| 2024 | 14 |

The Ku Klux Klan, often abbreviated KKK and informally known as "the Klan", is the name of three distinct past and present groupings.

The following groups have been listed as active Klan groups in the SPLC's annual reports (years in parentheses refer to the year in which the group is included):

- Alabama Knights of the Ku Klux Klan (2021)
- Alliance of American Klans (2019)
- American Christian Dixie Knights of the Ku Klux Klan (2017, 2018, 2019, 2022)
- American Christian Knights of the Ku Klux Klan (2018, 2019, 2021)
- American Confederate Knights of the Ku Klux Klan (2017)
- American White Knights of the Ku Klux Klan (2018)
- Aryan Knights of the Invisible Empire (2018)
- Aryan Nations Knights of the Ku Klux Klan (2014, 2015)
- Christian American Knights of the Ku Klux Klan (2016)
- Church of the American Christian Knights (2017)
- Church of the Ku Klux Klan (2021)
- Church of the National Knights of the Ku Klux Klan (2016, 2017, 2018, 2019, 2021)
- Confederate White Knights of the Ku Klux Klan (2015, 2016, 2017, 2018, 2019)
- East Coast Knights of the True Invisible Empire (2015, 2016, 2017, 2018, 2019, 2021, 2022)
- Eastern White Knights of the KKK (2015)
- Exalted Knights of the Ku Klux Klan (2017, 2019)
- Fraternal Order of the Cross (2014)
- Georgia Knight Riders of the Ku Klux Klan (2016)
- Global Crusaders: Order of the Ku Klux Klan (2017, 2018)
- Great Lakes Knights of the Ku Klux Klan (2016)
- Honorable Sacred Knights of the Ku Klux Klan (2018, 2019, 2021, 2022)
- Imperial Klans of America, Knights of the Ku Klux Klan (2014, 2015, 2019)
- International Keystone Knights of the Ku Klux Klan (2014, 2015, 2016, 2017, 2018, 2019)
- Karolina Knights of the Ku Klux Klan (2015)
- KKKRadio (2014, 2015)
- Knights of the Ku Klux Klan/Christian Revival Center (of Harrison, Arkansas) (2014, 2015, 2016, 2017, 2018, 2019, 2021, 2022)
- Knights of the White Disciples (2016, 2017)
- Knights Party Veterans League (2014, 2015)
- Ku Klos Knights of the Ku Klux Klan (2014, 2015, 2016, 2017, 2019)
- Loyal White Knights of the Ku Klux Klan (2014, 2015, 2016, 2017, 2018, 2019, 2021, 2022)
- Militant Knights Ku Klux Klan (2015, 2016)
- Mississippi White Knights of the Ku Klux Klan (2014, 2015, 2017, 2018)
- Noble Klans of America (2018, 2019)
- Nordic Order Knights of the Ku Klux Klan (2016, 2017, 2018, 2019)
- North Mississippi White Knights of the Ku Klux Klan (2017)
- Oklahoma Knights of the Ku Klux Klan (2015)
- Old Dominion Knights of the Ku Klux Klan (2016)
- Old Glory Knights of the Ku Klux Klan (2016, 2021, 2022)
- Original Knight Riders Knights of the Ku Klux Klan (2014, 2015, 2016, 2017)
- Original Knights of America, Knights of the Ku Klux Klan (2017, 2018)
- Outlaw Knights of the Ku Klux Klan (2016)
- Pacific Coast Knights of the Ku Klux Klan (2016, 2017, 2018, 2019)
- Patriotic Brigade Knights of the Ku Klux Klan (2016, 2017, 2018, 2019, 2021)
- Rebel Brigade Knights True Invisible Empire (2015, 2016, 2017, 2018, 2019)
- Rocky Mountain Knights of the Ku Klux Klan (2014)
- Sacred Knights of the Ku Klux Klan (2017)
- Soldiers of the Cross Training Institute (2014, 2015)
- Southern Mountain Knights of the Ku Klux Klan (2014)
- Southern Ohio Knights of the Ku Klux Klan (2016, 2017)
- Teutonic Knights of the Ku Klux Klan (2019)
- Texas Knights of the Ku Klux Klan (2014, 2015)
- Texas Rebel Knights of the Ku Klux Klan (2015, 2016, 2017, 2018)
- Traditional Confederate Knights (2015)
- Traditional Rebel Knights of the Ku Klux Klan (2014, 2015)
- Traditionalist American Knights of the Ku Klux Klan (2014, 2015, 2016, 2017, 2018, 2019)
- Trinity White Knights of the Ku Klux Klan (2014, 2015)
- True311.com (2021, 2022)
- True Invisible Empire Knights / True Invisible Empire Traditionalist American Knights of the Ku Klux Klan (2014, 2015)
- United Dixie White Knights/"United Dixie White Knights of the Ku Klux Klan" (2014, 2015, 2016, 2017, 2018, 2019)
- United Klan Nation (2021, 2022)
- United Klans of America (2014, 2015, 2016, 2017, 2018, 2019)
- United Northern and Southern Knights of the Ku Klux Klan (2014, 2015, 2016, 2017, 2018, 2019)
- United White Knights of the Ku Klux Klan (2014, 2015, 2016, 2017, 2018)
- Western White Knights of the Ku Klux Klan (2015)
- White Camelia Knights of the Ku Klux Klan (2015)
- White Christian Brotherhood of the Ku Klux Klan (2021, 2022)
- White Knights of Texas (2018, 2019)
- White Knights of the Ku Klux Klan of America (2017)

=== Neo-Nazi ===
Number of Neo-Nazi groups listed over time
| Year | Number listed |
|---|---|
| 2003 | 149 |
| 2004 | 158 |
| 2005 | 157 |
| 2006 | 191 |
| 2007 | 207 |
| 2008 | 196 |
| 2009 | 161 |
| 2010 | 170 |
| 2011 | 170 |
| 2012 | 138 |
| 2013 | 143 |
| 2014 | 142 |
| 2015 | 94 |
| 2016 | 99 |
| 2017 | 121 |
| 2018 | 112 |
| 2021 | 54 |
| 2024 | 61 |

Neo-Nazism consists of post-World War II social or political movements seeking to revive Nazism or related ideologies. Common aspects of modern-day neo-Nazism include hatred or fear of minorities such as blacks, Hispanics, lesbian, gay, and transgender people, non-white immigrants, and sometimes even Christians, but their main hatred is focused on the Jews (their "cardinal enemy").

The following groups have been listed as active neo-Nazi groups in the SPLC's annual reports (years in parentheses refer to the year in which the group is included):

- 14 First (2021)
- America First Committee (2016, 2017, 2018)
- American Futurist (2021, 2022)
- American National Socialist Party (2021, 2022)
- American Nazi Party (2014, 2015, 2016, 2017, 2018, 2021, 2022)
- AryanFolk.com (2021)
- Aryan Freedom Network (2021, 2022)
- Aryan National Army (2022)
- Aryan Nations (Louisiana) (2015, 2016)
- Aryan Nations Sadistic Souls MC / Sadistic Souls Motorcycle Club (2014, 2015, 2016, 2017, 2018)
- Aryan Nations (2014)
- Aryan Nations Worldwide (2015, 2016, 2017)
- Aryan Nations – Church of the Jesus Christ Christian (2021, 2022)
- Aryan Renaissance Society (2016, 2017)
- Atomwaffen Division / National Socialist Resistance Front (2016, 2017, 2018) (2022 as "National Socialist Resistance Front")
- Battalion 14 (2014)
- Christian Defense League (2014, 2015)
- Church of Aryanity / Order of the Western Knights Templar (2022)
- Church of Ben Klassen, The (2021, 2022)
- Creativity Alliance, The (2014, 2015, 2016, 2018, 2021, 2022)
- Creativity Movement (2014, 2015, 2016, 2017, 2018)
- Daily Stormer, The (2014, 2015, 2016, 2018, 2021, 2022)
- Einherjar's Honor Wotansvolk (2016)
- Endangered Souls RC/Crew 519 (2016, 2017, 2018)
- Folks Front/Folkish Resistance Movement (2021, 2022)
- The Forssaken Motorcycle Club (2014)
- Fuhrernet (2021)
- Golden Dawn (2015, 2016, 2017)
- Heathens Motorcycle Club (2014)
- Injekt Division (2021)
- Iron Youth (2021)
- Maryland National Socialist Party (2014)
- National Alliance (2014, 2015, 2016, 2017, 2018, 2021, 2022)
- National Alliance Reform and Restoration Group (2015, 2016, 2017, 2018)
- National Socialist Charitable Coalition/Global Minority Initiative (2021, 2022)
- Nationalist Social Club (NSC-131) (2021, 2022)
- National Socialist Freedom Movement (2014, 2015)
- National Socialist German Workers Party (Nebraska) (2014, 2015, 2016, 2017, 2018, 2021)
- National Socialist Legion (2018)
- National Socialist Liberation Front (2017, 2018)
- National Socialist Movement (2014, 2015, 2016, 2017, 2018, 2021, 2022)
- National Socialist Order (2021, 2022)
- Nationalist Coalition (2014)
- Nationalist Initiative (2018)
- Nationalist Women's Front (2017, 2018)
- NatSoc Florida (2022)
- New Order (2014, 2015, 2016, 2017, 2018, 2021, 2022)
- Noble Breed Kindred (2016, 2017, 2018)
- NS Publications (2014, 2015, 2016, 2017, 2018, 2021, 2022)
- NSDAP (2022)
- Patriotic Dissent Books (2021, 2022)
- PzG Inc. (2016, 2017, 2018, 2021, 2022)
- Radio Wehrwolf (2018)
- Revolutionary Order of the Aryan Republic (2014)
- Straight Arm Media (2021)
- Sunshine State Nationalists (2022)
- Third Reich Books (2014, 2015, 2016, 2017, 2018, 2021, 2022)
- Traditionalist Workers Party (2017, 2018)
- Vanguard America (2017, 2018)
- Vanguard America Women's Division (2018)
- Vanguard News Network (2017, 2018, 2021, 2022)
- Vinland Rebels (2022)
- Werewolf 88 (2016)
- White Aryan Resistance (2014, 2015, 2016, 2017, 2018)
- White Devil Social Club (2016, 2017)
- Wolfhook Life Clothing (2016, 2017)

=== White nationalist ===
Number of white nationalist hate groups listed over time
| Year | Number listed |
|---|---|
| 2003 | 92 |
| 2004 | 99 |
| 2005 | 111 |
| 2006 | 110 |
| 2007 | 125 |
| 2008 | 111 |
| 2009 | 132 |
| 2010 | 136 |
| 2011 | 146 |
| 2012 | 135 |
| 2013 | 128 |
| 2014 | 115 |
| 2015 | 95 |
| 2016 | 100 |
| 2017 | 100 |
| 2018 | 148 |
| 2019 | 155 |
| 2021 | 98 |

The SPLC listed 148 white nationalist groups and chapters as active in 2018, and 98 white nationalist groups and chapters as active in 2021. Its 2018 report noted: "White nationalist groups espouse white supremacist or white separatist ideologies, often focusing on the alleged inferiority of nonwhites. Groups listed in a variety of other categories — Ku Klux Klan, neo-Confederate, neo-Nazi, racist skinhead and Christian Identity — could also be fairly described as white nationalist." The following groups have been listed as active white separatist/white nationalist groups in the SPLC's annual reports (years in parentheses refer to the year in which the group is included):

- Active Club (North Carolina) (2022)
- Active Club (Ohio) (2022)
- Active Club (Oregon) (2022)
- Active Club (Tennessee) (2022)
- Advanced White Society (2014, 2015)
- Alternative Right (2014, 2015, 2016, 2017)
- AltRight Corporation (2017, 2018)
- Affirmative Right (2018, 2019, 2021, 2022)
- America First Foundation (2021, 2022)
- American Eagle Party (2015, 2016)
- American Freedom News (2021, 2022)
- American Freedom Party (2014, 2015, 2016, 2017, 2018, 2019, 2021, 2022)
- American Freedom Union (2017, 2018, 2019)
- American Identity Movement/Identity Evropa (2016, 2017, 2018, 2019)
- American Nationalist Association (2014, 2015)
- American Nationalist Union (2014, 2015, 2016)
- American Patriots USA (2019, 2021)
- American Renaissance/New Century Foundation (2014, 2015, 2016, 2017, 2018, 2019, 2021, 2022)
- American Vanguard (2016)
- American Vikings (2014)
- Amerikaner (2022)
- Antelope Hill Publishing (2021, 2022)
- Arktos Media (2018, 2019, 2021, 2022)
- Aryan Wear (2014)
- Auburn White Student Union (2017, 2018)
- AZ Active Club (2022)
- Barnes Review/Foundation for Economic Liberty, Inc. (2014)
- Bay State Active Club (2021)
- Big Sky Active Club (2022)
- Blood River Radio (2019, 2021, 2022)
- Bob's Underground Graduate Seminar/BUGS (2014, 2015, 2016, 2017)
- Center for the Advancement of Occidental Culture (CAOC) (2014)
- Center for Perpetual Diversity (2016)
- Clockwork Crew (2022)
- Colchester Collection, The (2019, 2021, 2022)
- Confederate Patriot Voters United (2014, 2015)
- Conservative Citizens Foundation, Inc. (2014, 2015, 2016, 2017, 2018)
- Council for Social and Economic Studies (2014, 2015)
- Council of Conservative Citizens (2014, 2015, 2016, 2017, 2018, 2019, 2021, 2022)
- Counter-Currents Publishing (2014, 2015, 2016, 2017, 2018, 2019, 2021, 2022)
- Counter.Fund (2017)
- Christ the King Reformed Church (of Charlotte, Michigan) (2021, 2022)
- Cursus Honorum Foundation (2019, 2021)
- Delaware Advanced White Society (2014)
- Dominion Active Club (2021, 2022)
- European American Action Coalition (2014, 2015, 2016)
- European American Front (2014, 2015, 2016)
- Evergreen (2022)
- Exodus/Americanus (2018, 2019, 2021, 2022)
- Faith and Heritage (2014, 2015, 2016, 2017, 2018, 2019)
- Family Home Northwest (2014)
- Fight White Genocide (2019, 2021, 2022)
- Fitzgerald Griffin Foundation, The (2014, 2015, 2016, 2017, 2018, 2019, 2021, 2022)
- Forza Nuova – USA (2016, 2017, 2018, 2019)
- Foundation for the Marketplace of Ideas (2016, 2017, 2018)
- Free America Rally (2014)
- Free American (2014, 2015, 2016, 2017, 2018)
- Free Edgar Steele (2014, 2015)
- Front Range Active Club (2021, 2022)
- Full Haus (2021, 2022)
- Freestartr (2018)
- GoyFundMe (2017)
- H.L. Mencken Club (2014, 2015, 2016, 2017, 2018, 2019)
- Heartland Patriots (2022)
- Heritage and Destiny (2014, 2015, 2016)
- Identity Vanguard (2015)
- Indiana Active Club (2021, 2022)
- International Conservative Movement (2021)
- Kinist Institute (2014)
- Koschertified? (2021, 2022)
- Legion of St. Ambrose (2019)
- Malevolent Freedom (2014, 2015)
- Mannerbund (2021)
- Middle American News (2014)
- National Assembly (2019)
- National Association for the Advancement of America (2014, 2015)
- National Justice Party (2021, 2022)
- National Policy Institute (2014, 2015, 2016, 2017, 2018, 2019)
- National Reformation Party (2021)
- National Right (2018)
- National Youth Front (2014, 2015)
- Nationalist Movement (2014, 2015)
- New Albion (2017, 2018)
- New Century Productions – A Conversation About Race (2014)
- New Columbia Movement (2022)
- New Jersey European Heritage Association (2019, 2021, 2020)
- Northwest Front (2014, 2015, 2016, 2017, 2018, 2019, 2021, 2022)
- Occidental Dissent (2014, 2015, 2016, 2017, 2018, 2019, 2021, 2022)
- Occidental Observer/Occidental Quarterly/Charles Martel Society (2014, 2015, 2016, 2017, 2018, 2019, 2021, 2022)
- Operation Homeland (2017)
- Our Fight Clothing (2019)
- Pacifica Forum (2014, 2015)
- Patriot Front (2017, 2018, 2019, 2021, 2022)
- Patriotic Flags (of Summerville, South Carolina) (2014, 2015, 2016, 2017, 2018, 2019, 2021, 2022)
- Pennsylvania Active Club (2022)
- Phalanx (2016)
- Pioneer Fund (2014)
- Pioneer Little Europe (Montana)/Pioneer Little Europe Kalispell Montana (2014, 2015, 2016, 2017, 2018, 2019)
- Political Cesspool, the (2014, 2015, 2016, 2017, 2018, 2019, 2021, 2022)
- Protestant White Nationalist Party of Kentucky/Uncreated Light (2014)
- Racial Nationalist Party of America (2014, 2015, 2016, 2017, 2018, 2019, 2021, 2022)
- Radix Journal (2014, 2015, 2016, 2017, 2018, 2019, 2021, 2022)
- Real Republic of Florida (2017, 2018, 2019)
- Red Ice (2017, 2018, 2019, 2021, 2022)
- Red October (2014)
- Renaissance Horizon (2019, 2021, 2022)
- Renegade Broadcasting (2015)
- Revolt Through Tradition (2021, 2022)
- Right Brand Clothing (2018, 2019)
- Right Wing Resistance (2015)
- Rise Above Movement (2017, 2018, 2019)
- RootBocks (2017)
- School of the West (2021, 2022)
- Scott-Townsend Publishers (2014, 2015, 2016, 2017, 2018, 2019, 2021, 2022)
- Shieldwall Network (2018, 2019, 2021, 2022)
- SoCal Active Club / NorCal Active Club / Central CA Active Club (2022)
- Social Contract Press, The (2014, 2015, 2016, 2017, 2018, 2019) – listed in the anti-immigrant category in 2014, and the white nationalist category thereafter
- Sons & Daughters of Liberty (2016)
- South Africa Project (2014, 2015, 2016)
- South Knox Ten Milers (2014)
- Southern European Aryans League Army (2014)
- Southern Sons Active Club (2022)
- Stormfront (2014, 2015, 2016, 2017, 2018, 2019, 2021, 2022)
- The Base (2019, 2021)
- The Foundry (2019)
- The New Byzantium Project (2017)
- The Right Stuff (2016, 2017, 2018, 2019, 2021, 2022)
- Tightrope Records (2022) - previously listed under hate music
- Traditionalist Workers Party (2015, 2016) (an offshoot of the Traditionalist Youth Network)
- Traditionalist Youth Network (2014, 2015, 2016, 2017)
- Tribal Theocrat (2019)
- True Cascadia (2017, 2018)
- Tyr 1 Security (2017, 2018)
- United People of America (2022)
- Unity and Security for America (2018)
- Vandal Brothers, LLC (2018, 2019)
- VDARE Foundation (2014, 2015, 2016, 2017, 2018, 2019, 2021, 2022)
- Voice of Reason Broadcast Network (2014)
- Washington Summit Publishers (2014, 2015, 2016, 2017, 2018, 2019)
- WeSearchr (2017, 2018)
- Western Outlands Supply Company (2017, 2018)
- Whitakeronline (2014, 2015)
- White Advocacy Movement (2014, 2015)
- White Boy Society (2014, 2016, 2017, 2018)
- White Date (2022)
- White Lives Matter (2016)
- White Man's March (2014)
- White New York (2016)
- White Rabbit Radio (2014, 2015, 2016, 2017, 2018, 2019, 2021, 2022)
- White Trash Rebel (2015)
- White Student Union of Tarrant County (2014)
- White Voice, The (2014, 2015)
- Will2Rise (2021, 2022)
- World View Foundations (2014, 2015)
- WTM Enterprises (2014, 2015, 2016)

=== Racist skinheads ===
Number of racist skinhead hate groups listed over time
| Year | Number listed |
|---|---|
| 2003 | 39 |
| 2004 | 48 |
| 2005 | 56 |
| 2006 | 78 |
| 2007 | 90 |
| 2008 | 98 |
| 2009 | 122 |
| 2010 | 136 |
| 2011 | 133 |
| 2012 | 138 |
| 2013 | 126 |
| 2014 | 119 |
| 2015 | 95 |
| 2016 | 78 |
| 2017 | 71 |
| 2018 | 63 |
| 2020 | 36 |
| 2021 | 17 |

The SPLC defines racist skinhead as "a particularly violent element of the white supremacist movement," often "referred to as the 'shock troops' of the hoped-for revolution." An offshoot of the skinhead subculture, racist skinheads promote antisemitism in addition to white supremacy. The SPLC's reports have noted that the racist skinhead movement "flourished during the 1980s through the 1990s and into the mid-2000s" but has declined since 2012, losing ground to "the racist 'alt-right' and new, younger neo-Nazi and white nationalist groups who are organizing themselves across diffuse social networking sites and platforms." The SPLC noted in its 2021 report, "With almost no young recruits, the racist skinhead movement's prominence within this country's white power movement has diminished steadily for years."

The following groups have been listed as active racist skinhead groups in the SPLC's annual reports (years in parentheses refer to the year in which the group is included):

- AC Skins (2014, 2015, 2016, 2017, 2018, 2020, 2021, 2022)
- AC/OC (2018)
- American Defense Skinheads (2020, 2021, 2022)
- American Front (2014, 2015, 2016, 2017, 2018, 2020, 2021, 2022)
- American Patriot Brigade (2017, 2018)
- American Vikings (2016, 2017)
- American Viking Clothing Co. (2015, 2018)
- Aryan Strikeforce (2014, 2015, 2016, 2017)
- Aryan Terror Brigade (2014, 2015)
- Be Active Front USA (2016, 2017, 2018)
- Bergen County Hooligans (2014)
- Blood & Honour U.S.A. (2014, 2015, 2017, 2018) and Blood and Honour America Division (2016, 2017, 2018)
- Blood and Honour Social Club (2015, 2016, 2017, 2018, 2020)
- California Skinheads (2015, 2016, 2017, 2018)
- Confederate 28 (2017)
- Confederate Hammerskins (2015, 2016, 2017, 2018, 2020, 2022)
- Crew 38 (2014, 2015, 2016, 2017, 2018, 2020)
- Die Auserwahlten (2014, 2017, 2020)
- Eastern Hammerskins (2015, 2016, 2017, 2018)
- Firm 22 (2016, 2017, 2020, 2021, 2022)
- Golden State Skinheads (2015, 2016, 2017, 2018, 2020)
- Golden State Solidarity (2014)
- Golden-State 45/Kindred 45 (2017)
- Hammerskins (2014)
- Hated and Proud Skins (2014)
- Keystone State Skinheads (2014, 2015, 2016, 2018)
- Keystone United (2017, 2020, 2021, 2022)
- Lone Star United (2014)
- Maryland State Skinheads (2014, 2015, 2016, 2017)
- Midland Hammerskins (2015, 2016, 2017, 2018)
- Nord Herrenvolk (2014)
- Northern Hammerskins (2015, 2016, 2017, 2018)
- Northwest Hammerskins / Northwestern Hammerskins (2015, 2016, 2017, 2018, 2020, 2022)
- Northwest Women's Front (2020)
- Old Glory Skinheads (2014, 2015, 2021)
- Orange County Skins (2014)
- Sacto Skins/Sacto Skinheads (2014, 2015, 2016, 2017, 2018)
- Sadistic Souls Skinheads
- Supreme White Alliance (2014, 2015, 2016)
- The Hated (2014, 2015)
- United Skinhead Nation (2020, 2021, 2022)
- United Society of Aryan Skinheads (2014)
- United Southern Skins (2018)
- Vinland Clothing (2016, 2021, 2022)
- Vinlanders / Vinlanders Social Club (2014, 2015, 2016, 2017, 2018, 2020, 2021, 2022)
- W.A.R./P.F.R. (2020)
- Warlord Skins (2015)
- Warrior's Pride Clothing (2017, 2018)
- Western Hammerskins (2015, 2016, 2017, 2018, 2020)

=== Extreme antigovernment movement ===
Number of extreme antigovernment groups over time
| Year | Number listed |
|---|---|
| 2014 | 874 |
| 2015 | 998 |
| 2016 | 623 |
| 2017 | 689 |
| 2018 | 612 |
| 2021 | 488 |

The SPLC's 2021 report states: "Groups we list as antigovernment see the federal government as an enemy of the people and promote baseless conspiracy theories generally involving a secret cabal of elites seeking to institute a global, totalitarian government – a 'New World Order." The SPLC notes that the antigovernment movement includes the militia movement (including paramilitary organizations, such as the Three Percenters (also styled III%ers) and Oath Keepers); the "sovereign citizen" movement, which rejects the government's authority; the so-called "constitutional sheriff" movement, which holds that local sheriffs are the highest authority and can disregard federal laws; and tax protestor movement that claims that income taxes are unconstitutional and seeks to avoid paying such taxes.

SPLC notes that antigovernment groups "engage in groundless conspiracy theorizing, or advocate or adhere to extreme antigovernment doctrines" and added: "Antigovernment groups do not necessarily advocate or engage in violence or other criminal activities, though some have. Many warn of impending government violence or the need to prepare for a coming revolution. Many antigovernment groups are not racist."

The SPLC designated 566 extreme antigovernment groups as active in 2020, and 488 extreme antigovernment groups as active in 2021.

Of the 488 organizations designated as active in 2021, 92 were militia groups, 75 were "sovereign citizen" groups, three were "constitutional sheriff" groups, and 52 were "conspiracy propagandist" groups.

==== Militia movement ====
- Alamo Militia (2020)
- American Patriots Three Percent (2020, 2021, 2022)
- Arizona Border Recon (2021, 2022)
- Arizona State Militia (2020, 2021)
- Arkansas Defense Force (2020, 2021)
- Bedford County Militia (2021, 2022)
- California State Militia (2020, 2021, 2022)
- Carlisle Light Infantry (2020, 2021, 2022)
- Civilian Defense Force (2020, 2021)
- Cottonwood Militia (2021, 2022)
- Emergency Non-Profit Assisting Communities (also listed as "Emergency Non-Profit Assisting Communities Together (ENACT)") (2020, 2021)
- Florida Militia (2020)
- Frontiersmen, The (2020, 2021, 2022)
- Genesee County Volunteer Militia (2020, 2021)
- Georgia Three Percent Martyrs (2020, 2021)
- Golden Triangle Militia (2020)
- Good Citizen Militia (2022)
- Green Mountain Militia (2020)
- III% Security Force (2020, 2021, 2022)
- III% United Patriots (2020, 2021, 2022)
- Indiana Citizens Volunteer Militia (2020, 2021)
- Iron City CRU (Citizens Response Unit) (2020, 2021, 2022)
- Irregulars of Ohio Reserve Militia (2020, 2021)
- Last Militia, The (2021, 2022)
- Last Sons of Liberty (Virginia) (2021)
- Light Foot Militia (of Kootenai County, Idaho) (2021)
- Light Foot Militia, 63rd Battalion (2022)
- Maine Militia (2020, 2021)
- Mayhem Solutions Group (2022)
- Michigan Home Guard (2020, 2021, 2022)
- Michigan Liberty Militia (2020, 2021, 2022)
- Michigan Militia Corps Wolverines (2020, 2021)
- Missouri Militia (2020, 2021, 2022)
- New England Minutemen (2020, 2021, 2022)
- New York Militia TM / New York Militia (2020, 2021, 2022)
- North East Ohio Woodsmen (2021, 2022)
- Northern Arizona Militia (2021)
- Oath Keepers (2020, 2021, 2022)
- Ohio Defense Force Home Guard (2020, 2021, 2022)
- Ohio Militiamen (2020, 2021, 2022)
- Ohio Minutemen Militia (2020, 2021, 2022)
- Ohio State Regular Militia (2021)
- Ohio Valley Minutemen Citizen's Volunteer Militia (2021)
- Patriots for America (2021, 2022)
- Pima County, AZ Watchmen (2021)
- Pennsylvania Light Foot Militia (2021, 2022)
- Pennsylvania Oath Keepers (2020, 2021, 2022) - listed separately from the Oath Keepers
- Pennsylvania Volunteer Militia (2021, 2022)
- Proud American Patriots Network (2021, 2022)
- Real Three Percenters Idaho, The (2021, 2022)
- Reapers Constitutional Militia of Ohio (2020, 2021)
- South Central Pennsylvania Patriots (2022)
- Southeast Michigan Volunteer Militia (2021, 2022)
- Southern Arizona Militia (2021, 2022)
- Stokes County Militia (2020, 2021, 2022)
- This Is Texas Freedom Force (2020, 2021, 2022)
- Three Percent of Washington (2021, 2022)
- Vermont State Militia (2021, 2022)
- Veterans on Patrol (2020, 2021, 2022)
- Watchmen of America (listed as "Watchmen" in 2022) (2021, 2022)
- West Ohio Minutemen (2020, 2021, 2022)
- Wolverine Watchmen (2020)
- Yavapai County Preparedness Team (2022)

==== Sovereign citizen movement ====
- Al Moroccan Empire at New Jersey State Republic (listed in 2021 as "El Moroccan Empire at New Jersey State Republic") (2021, 2022)
- America's Remedy (2020, 2021, 2022)
- American Common Law Academy (2022)
- American Meeting Group (Austin, TX) (2022)
- American Meeting Group (Wisconsin) (2022)
- American Project, The (2022)
- American States Assembly, The (2020, 2021, 2022)
- ASN Study Guide & University (American State Nationals) (2022)
- California Assembly, The (2022)
- Circle of Sovereigns (2020, 2021)
- Colorado Jural Assembly (2022)
- Constitutional Law Group (2021, 2022)
- Corporate Freedom Group (2020, 2021)
- Creditors Debtors Contracts in Commerce (CDCIC) (2020, 2021)
- Embassy of Heaven (2020, 2021, 2022)
- Empire Washitaw de Dugdahmoundyah (2020, 2021, 2022)
- Foundation, The (2020, 2021, 2022)
- Freedom Bound International (2020, 2021, 2022)
- Freedom from Government (2020, 2021, 2022)
- Freedom School (2020, 2021, 2022)
- Freedom Yell (2020, 2021, 2022)
- HISAdvocates.org (2020, 2021, 2022)
- March to Exodus (2020, 2021, 2022)
- Moorish Science Temple of America 1928, The (2020, 2021)
- National Assembly (2020, 2021, 2022)
- National Liberty Alliance (2020, 2021, 2022)
- Natural Law Hawaii (2022)
- Occupied Forces Hawaii Army (2022)
- Oregon States Jural Assembly (listed in 2022 as "Oregon Statewide Jural Assembly") (2020, 2021, 2022)
- People's Bureau of Investigation (2022)
- R.V. Bey Publications (2020, 2021, 2022)
- Reign of the Heavens Society (2020, 2021, 2022)
- Republic for the United States of America (2020, 2021, 2022)
- Republic of Texas (2021, 2022)
- Rise of the Moors (2020, 2021, 2022)
- Sovereign Filing Solutions (2020, 2021, 2022)
- Sovereignty Education and Defense Ministry (2021, 2022)
- Statewide Common Law Grand Jury (2020, 2021, 2022)
- Team Law (2020, 2021, 2022)
- United States of America Republic Government (2020, 2021, 2022)
- We the People for Constitutional Sheriffs (2022)

==== Conspiracy propagandists ====
- Alt-Market.com (2021, 2022)
- American Freedom Network (2021, 2022)
- Citizen Review (listed in 2020 as "Citizen Review Online") (2020, 2021)
- Connecting the Dots (2020, 2021, 2022)
- Genesis Communications Network (2021, 2022)
- Healthy American, The (2021, 2022)
- InfoWars (2020, 2021, 2022)
- Jeremiah Films (2020, 2021, 2022)
- John Birch Society (2020, 2021, 2022)
- Liberty Hangout (2022)
- Liberty RoundTable (2022)
- Medical Kidnap (2020, 2021, 2022)
- Natural News (Cody, Wyoming) (2021, 2022)
- North Western Research Institute (2020, 2021)
- Now the End Begins (2020, 2021, 2022)
- Political Prisoner Project (Boise, Idaho) (2020)
- Post and Email, The (2020, 2021, 2022)
- Prophecy Club Resources, The (2020, 2021, 2022)
- Red Voice Media (2022)
- Redoubt News (2020, 2021, 2022)
- Redpill Roadshow (2020, 2021)
- Republic Broadcasting (of Round Rock, Texas) (2020, 2021, 2022)
- Righteous Army (2022)
- Rule of Law Radio (of Austin, Texas) (2020, 2021, 2022)
- Silver Bear Café (of Garland, Texas) (2020, 2021, 2022)
- Silver Shield Xchange (2020, 2021, 2022)
- Stand Up America U.S. (2020, 2021, 2022)
- Texans4Truth (2020, 2021, 2022)
- Texas Eagle Forum (2020, 2021)
- TruthRadioShow.com (2020, 2021, 2022)
- Uncle Sam's Misguided Children (2020, 2021, 2022)
- What Really Happened (2020, 2021, 2022)
- Women Fighting for America (2021, 2022)
- WorldNetDaily (2020, 2021, 2022)

==== "Constitutional sheriff" movement ====
- American Police Officers Alliance (2022)
- Constitutional Sheriffs and Peace Officers Association (2020, 2021, 2022)
- Idaho Constitutional Sheriffs (2021, 2022)
- Protect America Now (2021, 2022)

==== "Antigovernment general" ====
- 2nd Amendment Patches.com (2020, 2021, 2022)
- America's Survival, Inc. (2020, 2021, 2022)
- American Constitutional Elites (2020)
- American Guard (2021)
- American Patriot Council (2020, 2021)
- American Patriot Party (2020, 2021, 2022)
- American Patriot Vanguard (2020, 2021, 2022)
- American Policy Center (2020, 2021, 2022)
- American Regulators (2021, 2022)
- American Revolution 2.0 (2021)
- A.R.M.E.D. Riding Club (2020)
- Army of Parents (2022)
- AVOW (Another Voice of Warning) (2021, 2022)
- AZ Desert Guardians (2020, 2021)
- Berks County Patriots (2020, 2021, 2022)
- Border Network News (2021, 2022)
- Camp Constitution (2020, 2021, 2022)
- Center for Self Governance (2021, 2022)
- Christian Exodus (2020)
- Citizens Militia of Mississippi (2020, 2021)
- Citizens Organized to Restore Rights (2022)
- Cold Dead Hands 2nd Amendment Advocacy Group (2020, 2021, 2022)
- Constitution Club, The (Hemet, California) (2020, 2021, 2022)
- Constitution Party (2020, 2021, 2022)
- Constitutional Party of Alaska (2021)
- Constitutional Coalition of New York State (listed in 2022 as "Constitutional Coalition of NYS") (2021)
- Constitutional Education & Consulting, KrisAnne Hall (listed in 2021 and 2022 simply as "KrisAnne Hall") (2020, 2021, 2022)
- Constitutional Rights PAC (of McLean, Virginia) (2020, 2021, 2022)
- Courage is a Habit (2022)
- Cowboys Motorcycle Club Idaho (listed in 2020 and 2021 as "Cowboys Motorcycle Club") (2020, 2021, 2022)
- Defense Distributed (2020, 2021, 2022)
- Democrats against U.N. Agenda 21 (2020, 2021)
- Eagle Forum (2020, 2021, 2022)
- Educate Yourself (2021, 2022)
- Education First Alliance (2022)
- Education Veritas (2022)
- Faith Education Commerce (FEC United) (2021, 2022)
- First State Pathfinders (2021, 2022)
- Free North Carolina (2020, 2021, 2022)
- Free PA (2022)
- Freedom Coalition (2021, 2022)
- Freedom First Society (2020, 2021, 2022)
- Freedom Law School (2020, 2021, 2022)
- Freedom Rising Sun (listed in 2020 as "Freedom Rising Son") (2020, 2021, 2022)
- Garden State 2A Grassroots Organization (2021, 2022)
- Gideon Knox Group, MT Daily Gazette (2021, 2022)
- Gorilla Learning Institute (2022)
- GraniteGrok (2021, 2022)
- Gun Owners of America (2020, 2021, 2022)
- Heartland Defenders (2021, 2022)
- Illinois Sons of Liberty (2021, 2022)
- Institute on the Constitution (aka American View), The (2020, 2021, 2022)
- LewRockwell.com (2020, 2021, 2022)
- Liberty First University (2021, 2022)
- Liberty News Network (2022)
- Liberty Under Fire (2020, 2021)
- Life Force Network (2022)
- Long Island Loud Majority (2021, 2022)
- Long Island Mutual Assistance Group (2020, 2021, 2022)
- Loving Liberty Network (2022)
- Madison's Militia (2020, 2021, 2022)
- Maine Volunteer Responders (2021)
- Mamalitia (2022)
- Marching Patriots, The (2021)
- Maulitia Motorcycle Club, The (listed in 2020 as Maulitia Bikers MC) (2020, 2021, 2022)
- Melrose Patriots (2022)
- Micro Effect, The (2020, 2021)
- Moms for America (2022)
- Moms for Liberty (2022, 2023, 2024)
- My Brother's Threepers (2020, 2021)
- National Constitutional Coalition of Patriotic Americans (2020, 2021, 2022)
- New California State (2022)
- New Sons of Liberty (McLoud, Oklahoma) (2020)
- News with Views (2020, 2021, 2022)
- Next News Network (2020, 2021, 2022)
- No Left Turn in Education (2022)
- NORTH-CAROLINA American Republic (2020)
- Ohio Patriots Alliance (2021, 2022)
- Outpost of Freedom (2020, 2021)
- Overpasses for America (2020, 2021, 2022)
- Panhandle Patriots Riding Club (2021, 2022)
- Parents Against CRT / Parents Against Critical Race Theory LLC (2022)
- Parents Defending Education (2022)
- Parents Involved in Education (2022)
- Parents Rights in Education (2022)
- Patriot America (2021, 2022)
- Patriot Depot, The / Discount Book Distributors (2020, 2021, 2022)
- Patriot Party of AZ (2021, 2022)
- Patriot Shit Outfitters (2020, 2021, 2022)
- Patriots at Large (2021)
- Patriots for Delaware (2021, 2022)
- Patriots for Ohio (2021, 2022)
- Pennsylvania Homeland Shield (2021)
- Pennsylvania Patriots United (2021, 2022)
- Pennsylvania State Militia (2021)
- People's Rights (2020, 2021, 2022)
- Purple for Parents Indiana (2022)
- Reawaken America Tour (2022)
- Renew America (2020, 2021, 2022)
- Rhode Island Patriots (2021, 2022)
- Riders United for a Sovereign America, Corp. (2020, 2021, 2022)
- Rolling Patriots, The (2021)
- Sarasota Patriots (2020, 2021, 2022)
- Secure Arkansas (2020, 2021, 2022)
- Sons of Liberty Survival Outfitters (2021, 2022)
- South Central Patriots (Wasilla, Alaska) (2020)
- Southeast Mesa CA (2022)
- Southern Ohio Outdoorsmen (2021, 2022)
- State of Jefferson Formation (2021, 2022)
- Stay in the Light Stay in the Fight (2022)
- Super Happy Fun America (2022)
- TEA New York (2021)
- Tea Party of Kentucky (2020, 2021, 2022)
- Tenth Amendment Center (2020, 2021, 2022)
- Texas Freedom Coalition (2022)
- Three Percent Liberty Defenders (2020, 2021)
- Threeper Tactical Training, LLC (2020)
- Timber Unity (2020, 2021, 2022)
- True Texas Project (2021, 2022)
- Union of Three Percenter American Patriots (2020, 2021, 2022)
- United States Justice Foundation (2020, 2021, 2022)
- Utah Citizens Alarm (2021, 2022)
- Utah Constitutional Militia (2020, 2021, 2022)
- Utah Patriots (2022)
- Virginia Knights (2020)
- Voice of Idaho, The (2020)
- Voices Against Tyranny (2021, 2022)
- We Are Change (2020, 2021, 2022)
- West Coast Patriots (2020, 2021)
- Wild Bill for America (2020, 2021, 2022)

=== Neo-Confederate ===
Number of neo-Confederate hate groups listed over time
| Year | Number listed |
|---|---|
| 2003 | 91 |
| 2004 | 97 |
| 2005 | 99 |
| 2006 | 102 |
| 2007 | 104 |
| 2008 | 93 |
| 2009 | 68 |
| 2010 | 42 |
| 2011 | 32 |
| 2012 | 30 |
| 2013 | 36 |
| 2014 | 37 |
| 2015 | 35 |
| 2016 | 43 |
| 2017 | 31 |
| 2018 | 36 |
| 2021 | 16 |
| 2024 | 4 |

The SPLC classifies neo-Confederate groups as those with "a reactionary, revisionist predilection for symbols of the Confederate States of America, typically paired with a strong belief in the validity of the failed doctrines of nullification and secession — in the specific context of the antebellum South."

The following groups have been listed as active neo-Confederate groups in the SPLC's annual reports (years in parentheses refer to the year in which the group is included):

- ACTBAC NC (2016, 2017, 2020, 2021, 2022)
- Confederate 901 (2020)
- Dixie Republic (2014, 2015, 2016, 2017, 2018, 2020, 2021, 2022, 2024)
- FreeMississippi (2016)
- Heirs to the Confederacy (2020)
- Identity Dixie (2017, 2018, 2020, 2021, 2022, 2024)
- Kingdom Treasure Ministries (2014, 2015)
- League of the South (2014, 2015, 2016, 2017, 2018, 2020, 2021, 2024)
- Livin' the Legacy (2014)
- Mary Noel Kershaw Foundation (2014, 2015, 2016, 2017)
- Pace Confederate Depot (2014, 2015, 2016, 2017)
- Southern Culture Center (2014)
- Southern Cultural Center (of Weogufka, Alabama) (2020, 2021, 2022, 2024)
- Southern Future (2016, 2017)
- Southern National Congress (2014, 2015, 2016)
- Southern Nationalist Network (2015)
- Southern Patriot Shoppe (2015)
- Southern Revivalist (2018)
- Wildman's Civil War Surplus and Herb Shop (2018)

=== Christian Identity ===
Number of Christian Identity hate groups listed over time
| Year | Number listed |
|---|---|
| 2003 | 31 |
| 2004 | 28 |
| 2005 | 35 |
| 2006 | 37 |
| 2007 | 36 |
| 2008 | 39 |
| 2009 | 37 |
| 2010 | 26 |
| 2011 | 55 |
| 2012 | 54 |
| 2013 | 37 |
| 2014 | 21 |
| 2015 | 19 |
| 2016 | 21 |
| 2017 | 20 |
| 2018 | 17 |
| 2021 | 9 |

Christian Identity is a label applied to a wide variety of loosely affiliated believers and churches with a white supremacist and antisemitic theology that claims that White people are the true descendants of the Lost Tribes of Israel.

The following groups have been listed as Christian Identity hate groups in the SPLC's annual reports (years in parentheses refer to the year in which the group is included):

- 11th Hour Remnant Messenger (2014)
- America's Promise Ministries (2014, 2015, 2016, 2017, 2018)
- Assembly of Christian Israelites (2022)
- Christian American Ministries (2016, 2017, 2018)
- Christian Identity Church – Aryan Nations (2014)
- Christian Revival Center (2015, 2016, 2017, 2018)
- Church of Israel (2016, 2017, 2018, 2021, 2022)
- Church of the Sons of YHVH or Church of the Sons of YHWH (2014, 2015)
- Christogenea - formerly listed as "Non-Universal Teaching Ministries/Christogenea" (2014, 2015, 2016, 2017, 2018, 2021, 2022)
- Covenant Nation Church of the Lord Jesus Christ (2017)
- Covenant People's Ministry (2014, 2015, 2016, 2017, 2018, 2021, 2022)
- Divine International Church of the Web (2014, 2015, 2016, 2017, 2018)
- Divine Truth Ministries (2016, 2017)
- Ecclesiastical Council for the Restoration of Covenant Israel (ECRCI) (2014, 2015)
- Euro Folk Radio (2016, 2017, 2018, 2021, 2022)
- Faith Baptist Church and Ministry (2015)
- Fellowship of God's Covenant People (2014, 2015, 2016, 2017, 2018, 2021, 2022)
- Holy Order Ministry (2014)
- Identity Nation (2014)
- Kingdom Identity Ministries (2014, 2015, 2016, 2017, 2018, 2021, 2022)
- Kinsman Redeemer Ministries (2014, 2015, 2016)
- Knights of the Holy Identity (2014)
- Mission to Israel / Mission to Israel Ministries (2014, 2015, 2016, 2017, 2018, 2021, 2022)
- Our Place Fellowship (2014, 2015, 2016, 2017, 2018)
- Restored Assembly of Elohim (2018)
- Sacred Truth Publishing & Ministries (2016, 2017, 2018, 2021, 2022)
- Scriptures for America Ministries/Scriptures for America Worldwide Ministries (2014, 2015, 2016, 2017, 2018, 2021, 2022)
- Thomas Robb Ministries (2014, 2015)
- Truth in History (2017)
- Virginia Publishing Company (2014, 2015, 2016)
- Watchmen Bible Study Group (2014, 2015)
- Weisman Publications (2014, 2015, 2016)
- Yahushua Dual Seed Christian Identity Ministry (2016, 2017, 2018)
- Yahweh's Truth (2014, 2015, 2016, 2017, 2018)

=== Anti-LGBTQ ===
Anti-LGBTQ (lesbian, gay, bisexual, transgender, queer) or anti-gay can refer to activities in certain categories (or combinations of categories): attitudes against or discrimination against LGBTQ people, violence against LGBTQ people, opposition to LGBTQ rights, and religious opposition to homosexuality.

The following groups have been listed as active anti-LGBTQ hate groups in the SPLC's annual reports (years in parentheses refer to the year in which the group is included):

Eighty-six organizations were designated under this classification in 2023. This is an increase by about one-third from previous years and the highest number of anti-LGBTQ groups SPLC has ever listed.

- Abiding Truth Ministries (2014, 2015, 2016, 2017, 2018, 2019)
- Advocates Protecting Children (2023)
- Alliance Defending Freedom (2016, 2017, 2018, 2019, 2021, 2022, 2023)
- All Scripture Baptist Church (of Knoxville, Tennessee) (2019, 2021, 2022)
- American College of Pediatricians (2014, 2015, 2016, 2017, 2018, 2021, 2022, 2023)
- American Family Association (2014, 2015, 2016, 2017, 2018, 2021, 2022, 2023)
- American Vision (2014, 2015, 2016, 2017, 2018, 2021, 2022, 2023)
- Americans for Truth About Homosexuality (2014, 2015, 2016, 2017, 2018, 2021, 2022, 2023)
- ATLAH Media Network (formerly listed as ATLAH World Missionary Church/All The Land Anointed Holy) (2015, 2016, 2017, 2018, 2021, 2022, 2023)
- Bible Believers Fellowship (2017, 2018)
- California Family Council (2023)
- Campus Ministry USA, The (2015, 2016, 2017, 2018, 2021, 2022, 2023)
- Center for Christian Virtue (2023)
- Center for Family and Human Rights (C-FAM, formerly the Catholic Family and Human Rights Institute) (2014, 2015, 2016, 2017, 2018, 2022, 2023)
- Chalcedon Foundation (2014, 2015, 2016, 2017, 2018, 2021, 2022, 2023)
- Child and Parent Rights Campaign (2023)
- Church Militant/St. Michael's Media (2018, 2021, 2022, 2023)
- Christian Civil Rights Watch (2017)
- Christ the King Church (Larkspur, Colorado)
- Citizens for Community Values (2015, 2016)
- Concerned Christian Citizens (2018, 2021, 2022, 2023)
- Conservative Republicans of Texas (2015, 2016, 2017, 2018)
- D. James Kennedy Ministries (formerly Truth in Action Ministries) (2014, 2015, 2016, 2017, 2018, 2021, 2022, 2023)
- Do No Harm (2023)
- Faith Baptist Church (formerly Sons of Thundr) (of Violet, Louisiana, and Baton Rouge, Louisiana) (2014, 2015, 2016, 2019)
- Faith2Action (2015, 2016, 2017, 2018, 2022, 2023)
- Faithful Word Baptist Church (2014, 2015, 2016, 2017, 2018, 2021, 2022, 2023) - formerly also listed in "general hate" category
- Family Action Council of Tennessee (2023)
- The Family Foundation of Virginia (2023)
- Family Research Council (2014, 2015, 2016, 2017, 2018, 2021, 2022, 2023)
- Family Research Institute (2014, 2015, 2016, 2017, 2018, 2022, 2023)
- Family Watch International (2014, 2015, 2016, 2017, 2018, 2021, 2022, 2023)
- First Works Baptist Church (of El Monte, California) (2021, 2022, 2023)
- Florida Family Policy Council (2023)
- Friendship Assembly of God Church (2015)
- Frontline Policy Council (2023)
- Gays Against Groomers (2023)
- Generations / Generations With Vision (2014, 2015, 2016, 2017, 2018, 2021, 2022, 2023)
- Genspect (2023, 2024)
- Help Rescue Our Children (2014)
- Heterosexuals Organized for a Moral Environment (H.O.M.E.) (2014, 2015, 2016, 2017, 2018, 2021, 2022, 2023)
- Illinois Family Institute (2014, 2015, 2016, 2017, 2018, 2021, 2022, 2023)
- Jewish Political Action Committee (2014)
- Liberty Baptist Church (of Rock Falls, Illinois) (2021, 2022, 2023)
- Liberty Counsel (2014, 2015, 2016, 2017, 2018, 2021, 2022, 2023)
- Louisiana Family Forum (2023)
- MassResistance (2014, 2015, 2016, 2017, 2018, 2021, 2022, 2023)
- Massachusetts Family Institute (2023)
- Mission: America (2014, 2015, 2016, 2017, 2018, 2021, 2022, 2023)
- Montana Family Foundation (2023)
- Pacific Justice Institute (2014, 2015, 2016, 2017, 2018, 2021, 2022, 2023)
- Parents Action League (2014)
- Partners for Ethical Care (2023)
- Pass the Salt Ministries (2014, 2015, 2016, 2017, 2018, 2021, 2022, 2023)
- Pennsylvania Family Institute (2023)
- Pilgrims Covenant Church (of Monroe, Wisconsin) (2014, 2015, 2016, 2017, 2018, 2021, 2022, 2023)
- Pray in Jesus Name Project, The (2014, 2015, 2016, 2017, 2018, 2021, 2022, 2023)
- Probe Ministries (2014, 2015, 2016, 2017, 2018, 2021, 2022, 2023)
- Providence Road Baptist Church (2014, 2015, 2016)
- Public Advocate of the United States (2014, 2015, 2016, 2017, 2018, 2021, 2022, 2023)
- Revival Baptist Church (of Clermont and Jacksonville, Florida) (2021, 2022, 2023)
- Ruth Institute (2014, 2015, 2016, 2017, 2018, 2021, 2022, 2023)
- SaveCalifornia.com / Save California (2014, 2015, 2016, 2017, 2018, 2021, 2022, 2023)
- Scott Lively Ministries (2021, 2022, 2023)
- Society for Evidence-Based Gender Medicine (2023, 2024)
- Stedfast Baptist Church (of Fort Worth, Texas and Oklahoma City, Oklahoma) (2014, 2015, 2016, 2017, 2018, 2021, 2022, 2023)
- Strong Hold Baptist Church (of Norcross, Georgia) (2021, 2022, 2023)
- Sure Foundation Baptist Church (2018, 2019, 2022, 2023) (of Vancouver, Washington, Honolulu, Hawaii, and Spokane, Washington)
- TC Family (Traverse City Family) (2014, 2015, 2016)
- Tom Brown Ministries (2014, 2015, 2016, 2017, 2018, 2021, 2022, 2023)
- Traditional Values Coalition (2014, 2015, 2016, 2017)
- True Light Pentecost Church (of Spartanburg, South Carolina) (2014, 2015, 2016, 2017, 2018, 2021, 2022, 2023)
- United Families International (2014, 2015, 2016, 2017, 2018, 2021, 2022, 2023)
- Verity Baptist Church (of Sacramento, California) (2016, 2017, 2018, 2021, 2022, 2023)
- Warriors for Christ (of Mount Juliet, Tennessee) (2018, 2021, 2022, 2023)
- Westboro Baptist Church (of Topeka, Kansas) (2014, 2015, 2016, 2017, 2018, 2021, 2022, 2023)
- Windsor Hills Baptist Church (2014, 2015, 2016)
- International Organization for the Family (formerly Howard Center for Family, Religion and Society) and World Congress of Families (2014, 2015, 2016, 2017, 2018, 2021, 2023)

=== Anti-immigrant ===
The SPLC categories "the most extreme" nativist and vigilante groups as anti-immigrant hate groups, those which espouse xenophobia. The group classifies the Center for Immigration Studies (CIS), Federation for American Immigration Reform (FAIR) and NumbersUSA, as the "big three" groups in the anti-immigrant movement.

Eighteen organizations were classified under this designation in the 2021 SPLC report.

- American Border Patrol (previously listed as "American Border Patrol/Voice of Citizens Together") (2014, 2015, 2016, 2017, 2018, 2021, 2022)
- American Children First (2017)
- Americans for Legal Immigration (ALIPAC) (2014, 2015, 2016, 2017, 2018, 2021, 2022)
- American Immigration Control Foundation/Americans for Immigration Control (2014, 2015, 2016, 2017, 2018, 2021, 2022)
- Americans Have Had Enough (2014, 2015)
- AZ Patriots (2021, 2022)
- Borderkeepers of Alabama (2016, 2017)
- California Coalition for Immigration Reform (2014)
- Californians for Population Stabilization (2015, 2016, 2017, 2018, 2021, 2022)
- Camp LoneStar (2015)
- Center for Immigration Studies (2016, 2017, 2018, 2021, 2022)
- Colorado Alliance for Immigration Reform (2015, 2016, 2017, 2018, 2021, 2022)
- Concerned Citizens and Friends of Illegal Immigration Law Enforcement (2014, 2015, 2016)
- Dustin Inman Society, The (2017, 2018, 2021, 2022)
- Federation for American Immigration Reform (FAIR)/Immigration Reform Law Institute (2014, 2015, 2016, 2017, 2018, 2021, 2022) (separately listed since 2021, jointly listed before)
- Floridians for Immigration Enforcement (2021)
- Help Save Maryland (2021)
- Legal Immigrants for America (2016, 2017, 2018, 2021)
- National Coalition for Immigration Reform (formerly CCIR) (2015, 2016)
- Michiganders for Immigration Control and Enforcement (2017)
- Mountain Minutemen (2018)
- New Yorkers for Immigration Control and Enforcement (NYICE) (2014, 2015, 2016)
- North Carolinians for Immigration Reform and Enforcement (2017, 2022)
- Oregonians for Immigration Reform (2017, 2018, 2021, 2022)
- ProEnglish (2014, 2015, 2016, 2017, 2018, 2021, 2022)
- Remembrance Project, The (2017, 2018, 2021, 2022)
- Respect Washington (2017, 2018, 2021, 2022)
- San Diegans for Secure Borders (2017, 2018)
- Team America Political Action Committee (2017) – also listed in the anti-Muslim category
- Texans for Immigration Reduction and Enforcement (formerly "Texans for Immigration Control and Enforcement") (2017, 2018, 2021, 2022)
- US Border Guard/US Border Guard & Border Rangers (2014, 2015, 2016, 2017)
- United for a Sovereign America (2014)
- United Patriots for America (2022)

=== Antisemitism ===
In its 2021 report, SPLC classified 61 organizations under the category of antisemitism as a "standalone ideology," while also noting the antisemitism "also undergirds much of the far right, unifying adherents across various hate ideologies." Holocaust denial is one hallmark of antisemitic organizations. Eighteen organizations were classified under this designation in the 2021 SPLC report.

SPLC previously had a Holocaust denial hate group category. In 2020, SPLC began to designating hate groups under a broader "antisemitism" category, and noted in its report for the following year that "2021 is the first year that those groups have been pulled out from under the General Hate ideology umbrella and featured on their own exclusive map." SPLC's report notes that this category is "Made up largely of hate groups that deny and obscure facts about the Holocaust, as well as chapters of the Nation of Islam."

The following groups have been listed as active Holocaust denial groups in the SPLC's annual reports (years in parentheses refer to the year in which the group is included):

- Barnes Review, The/Foundation for Economic Liberty, Inc. (2015, 2016, 2017, 2018, 2022)
- Campaign for Radical Truth in History (2014, 2015, 2016, 2017)
- carolynyeager.net (2014, 2015, 2016, 2017, 2018, 2021, 2022) – listed in the white nationalist category in 2014–2015, in the Holocaust denial category from 2016 to 2020, and in the antisemitism category in 2021.
- Castle Hill Publishers (2014, 2015)
- Clemens and Blair, LLC (2022)
- Committee for Open Debate on the Holocaust (2014, 2015, 2016, 2017, 2018, 2021, 2022)
- Deir Yassin Remembered (2016, 2017, 2018)
- Goyim Defense League (2021, 2022)
- Inconvenient History (2014, 2015)
- Independent History & Research (2018, 2021, 2022)
- Institute for Historical Review/Institute for Historical Review Store (2014, 2015, 2016, 2017, 2018, 2021, 2022)
- Irving Books (2014, 2015, 2016, 2017)
- Nation of Islam (2014, 2015, 2016, 2017, 2018, 2021, 2022) - listed in the "black separatist" category from 2014 to 2016, in the "black nationalist" category in 2017–2019, and in the antisemitism category in 2021
- Noontide Press (2014, 2015)
- The International Conspiratological Association (2014, 2015)
- The Realist Report (2016, 2017, 2018, 2022)

=== Neo-Völkisch ===
In its 2017 report (issued in 2018), the SPLC added neo-Völkisch Asatru pagan groups to its hate group list for the first time. The SPLC described these groups as "[b]orn out of an atavistic defiance of modernity and rationalism" and characterized by "organized ethnocentricity and archaic notions of gender." In its 2021 report, SPLC listed 32 groups and group chapters under the neo-Völkisch category.

- Asatru Folk Assembly (2017, 2018, 2021, 2022)
- Black Sun Tribe Project, The (2021, 2022)
- Dakota Prairie Asatru (2021, 2022)
- Easter Tidings/Carolyn Emerick (2021, 2022)
- Folkgard of Holda and Odin (2017, 2018)
- Gallows Tree Wotansvolk Alliance (2014, 2015, 2016, 2017, 2018) – listed from 2014 to 2016 in neo-Nazi category, moved to Neo-Völkisch category beginning in 2017)
- Gallows Tree Wotansvolk (2017)
- Hearth & Helm LLC (2021, 2022)
- Hoosier Headhunters Fight Club (2017)
- Pacific Northwest Wolfpack Kindred (2018)
- The Gallowglasses Fight Club (2017)
- The Varangians Fight Club (2017)
- Wolf Age (2017, 2018)
- Wolves of Vinland (2015, 2016, 2017, 2018, 2021, 2022) – listed in 2015–2016 in the white separatist/nationalist category, moved to Neo-Völkisch category beginning in 2017
- Women for Aryan Unity (2021, 2022)

=== Anti-Muslim ===
Anti-Muslim hate groups are described by the SPLC as groups which exhibit extreme hostility against Muslims, by depicting Muslims as "fundamentally alien, ... irrational, intolerant, and violent" and accusing Islam of "sanctioning pedophilia, coupled with intolerance for homosexuals and women." Anti-Muslim hate groups espouse conspiratorial views of American Muslims, viewing them "as a fifth column intent on undermining and eventually replacing American democracy and Western civilization with Islamic despotism, a conspiracy theory known as 'civilization jihad.'"

In its 2021 report, SPLC listed 50 groups and group chapters under the anti-Muslim category.

The following groups have been listed as anti-Muslim hate groups in the SPLC's annual reports (years in parentheses refer to the year in which the group is included):

- III% Security Force (2016)
- ACT! for America (2015, 2016, 2017, 2018, 2021, 2022)
- Altra Firearms (2016)
- AlertAmerica.news (2021, 2022)
- American Constitution Center (2016)
- American Defence League (2014, 2015)
- American Freedom Alliance (2016, 2017, 2018, 2021)
- American Freedom Defense Initiative (also known as Freedom Defense Initiative and Stop Islamization of America) (2014, 2015, 2016, 2017, 2018, 2021, 2022)
- American Freedom Law Center (2015, 2016, 2017, 2018, 2021, 2022)
- American Public Policy Alliance (2017, 2018)
- American Security Rally of Montana (2016, 2017)
- Americans for America (2017)
- Atlas Shrugs (2014, 2015)
- Bare Naked Islam (2014, 2015, 2016)
- Bomb Islam, operated by Robert Sterkeson (2016, 2017, 2018)
- Bureau on American Islamic Relations (2015, 2016, 2017, 2018, 2021)
- Casa D'Ice Signs (2014, 2015)
- Center for Security Policy (2015, 2016, 2017, 2018, 2021, 2022)
- Christian Action Network (2014, 2015, 2016, 2017, 2018)
- Christian Guardians (2014, 2015)
- Christian Phalange (2014)
- Christians and Jews United for Israel (Hillsborough, New Hampshire) (2017)
- Citizens' Action Group of South Florida (2017, 2018)
- Citizens for National Security (2014, 2015, 2016, 2017, 2018, 2022)
- Citizens for the St. Croix Valley (2017, 2018)
- Citizen Warrior (2014, 2015)
- Clarion Project (2016, 2017, 2018)
- Committee to End the CSI Refugee Center (2016, 2017)
- Concerned American Citizens (2014)
- Concerned Citizens for the First Amendment (2014)
- Conservative Forum of Silicon Valley (2017)
- Counter Jihad Coalition (also formerly known as the "Counter Jihadist Coalition of Southern California") (2014, 2015, 2016, 2017, 2018, 2021, 2022)
- Counter Terrorism Cell (2017)
- Crusaders, The (2016)
- Cultures In Context Incorporated/Turning Point Project (2017, 2018, 2021, 2022)
- Cumberland Conservatives (2017)
- David Horowitz Freedom Center (2015, 2016, 2017, 2018, 2021, 2022)
- Escaping Islam (2014)
- Faith Freedom (2014, 2015, 2016)
- Faith Leaders for America (2017, 2018)
- Family Security Matters (2016, 2017, 2018)
- Florida Family Association (2014, 2015, 2017, 2018, 2021, 2022) - initially listed in the "general hate" category
- Fortress of Faith (2016, 2017, 2018, 2021, 2022)
- Foundation for Advocating Christian Truth / Acts 17 Apologetics (2016, 2017, 2018, 2021, 2022)
- G416 Patriots (2017, 2018, 2021, 2022)
- Glazov Gang Productions (listed in 2022 as "Glasov Gang Productions") (2018, 2021, 2022)
- Global and Theological Trends (2022)
- Global Faith Institute (2017, 2018, 2021, 2022)
- Gold is Money (2014)
- Islam: Making a True Difference in the World – One Body at a Time (2014, 2015)
- Islam: the Religion of Peace (and a big stack of dead bodies) (2014, 2015)
- Islamthreat.com (2014, 2015, 2016)
- Jihad Watch (2014, 2015, 2016, 2017, 2018, 2021, 2022)
- Keep South Dakota Safe PAC (2016, 2017, 2018)
- Last Chance Patriots (2019, 2021, 2022)
- Lincoln County Citizen Action Network (2016, 2017)
- Live Up to Freedom (2022)
- North Carolina Pastors Network (2018)
- Pig Blood Bullets (2016, 2017)
- Political Islam (2014, 2015, 2016, 2017, 2018, 2021, 2022)
- Proclaiming Justice to the Nations (2017, 2018)
- Prophet of Doom (2014, 2015)
- Radio Jihad/Global Patriot Radio (2014, 2015, 2016, 2017, 2018, 2021, 2022)
- Red-Green Axis Exposed (2021)
- Religious Awareness Network (2015, 2016)
- Religious Freedom Coalition (2017)
- Refugee Resettlement Watch (2016, 2017, 2018, 2021, 2022)
- Secure Michigan (2016, 2017)
- Security Studies Group (2017)
- Sharia Awareness Action Network (2014)
- Sharia Crime Stoppers (2018)
- Shoebat Foundation, The (2015, 2016, 2017, 2018, 2021)
- Silver Bullet Gun Oil (2014, 2015, 2016, 2017)
- Soldiers of Odin (2016, 2017, 2018)
- Southeast Michigan Tea Party (2017, 2018)
- Stop the Islamization of America (SIOA) (2015)
- Stop the Islamization of Nations (SION) (2014)
- Stop the Islamization of the World (2015, 2016)
- Straight Way and More, The / Straight Way of Grace Ministry, The (2015, 2016, 2017, 2018, 2021, 2022)
- Sultan Knish, a blog by Daniel Greenfield (2014, 2015, 2016)
- Sunshine on Government (SONG) Alliance (2017, 2018)
- Team America PAC (2016) – also listed in the anti-immigrant category
- Tennessee Eagle Forum (2017)
- Tennessee Freedom Coalition (2014, 2015)
- Treasure Valley Refugee Watch (2016)
- Truth in Love Project (2016, 2017, 2018, 2021, 2022)
- Truth in Textbooks (2017, 2018, 2021, 2022)
- Unconstrained Analytics (2017, 2018)
- Understanding the Threat (2016, 2017, 2018, 2021, 2022)
- United States Defense League (2014)
- United States Justice Foundation (2014)
- United West, The (2014, 2015, 2016, 2017, 2018, 2021, 2022)
- Virginia Christian Alliance (2016, 2017, 2018)
- What Did Mohammad Do? (2015)

=== "General hate" category ===
The following groups have been listed as other or miscellaneous hate groups in the SPLC's annual reports (years in parentheses refer to the year in which the group is included):

In the 2021 SPLC report, 295 groups and group chapters were listed in the "general hate" category, including 11 in the "hate music" category, 1 in the "male supremacy" category, 9 in the "radical traditionalist Catholic" category, and 274 in the "other" category.

==== Hate music ====
White power music is music that promotes white nationalism and expresses racism against non-whites. Genres include Nazi punk, Rock Against Communism, hatecore, and National Socialist black metal.

The following groups have been listed as active racist music/hate music groups in the SPLC's annual reports (years in parentheses refer to the year in which the group is included):

- A.D.S. Services (2021)
- American Defense Records (2016, 2017, 2018)
- BeaSSt Productions (2018, 2021)
- Black Metal Cult Records (2021, 2022)
- Brotherhood of Light Recordings (2021, 2022)
- Behold Barbarity Records & Distro (2016, 2017)
- Desastrious Records (2014)
- DNVF Records (2022)
- Elegy Records (2017, 2018)
- Get Some 88 (2014)
- H8 Propagand Art (2021, 2022)
- Hate Crime Streetwear Productions (2016)
- Heritage Connection (2014, 2015)
- Hypgnosis Records (2018)
- Hostile Class Productions (2016, 2017, 2018)
- ISD Records/NS88 Video (previously listed simply as "ISD Records") (2014, 2015, 2016, 2017, 2018, 2021, 2022)
- Label 56 (2014, 2015, 2016, 2017, 2018)
- Micetrap Distribution (2014, 2015, 2016, 2017)
- MSR Productions (2014, 2015, 2016, 2017, 2018, 2021, 2022)
- NSM88 Records (2015, 2016, 2017, 2018)
- Poker Face (2014, 2015, 2016, 2017)
- Resistance Records (2015, 2016, 2017)
- Soleilmoon Recordings (2016)
- Stahlhelm Records (2015, 2016, 2017, 2018)
- The Realist Report (2021)
- The Barnes Review (2021)
- Tightrope Records (2014, 2015, 2016, 2017, 2018, 2021)
- United Riot Records (2016, 2017, 2018, 2021, 2022)
- Vinlandic Werwolf Distribution (2018, 2021, 2022)
- White Power Hour (2022)
- Winter Solace Productions (2021, 2022)
- Wolf Tyr Productions (2016, 2017, 2018)
- Wolf's Head Records (2018)

==== Male supremacy ====
The SPLC added misogynistic male supremacy groups to its hate groups list for the first time in its 2017 report (issued in 2018), stating, "The vilification of women by these groups makes them no different than other groups that demean entire populations, such as the LGBT community, Muslims, or Jews, based on their inherent characteristics."

- A Voice for Men (2017, 2018, 2021)
- Return of Kings (2017, 2018)
- XY Crew (2022)

==== Radical traditional Catholic ====
According to the SPLC, radical traditionalist Catholics, who "may make up the largest single group of serious anti-Semites in America", subscribe to an ideology that is rejected by the Vatican and some 70 million mainstream American Catholics. They are highly associated with sedevacantism and integrism, the latter of which the SPLC uses as a synonym for radical-traditionalist positions.

The following groups have been listed as active radical traditional Catholic hate groups in the SPLC's annual reports (years in parentheses refer to the year in which the group is included):

- Alliance for Catholic Tradition (2014, 2015)
- Catholic Action Resource Center (2014, 2015)
- Catholic Apologetics International (2021, 2022)
- Catholic Counterpoint (2014, 2015, 2016)
- Catholic Family News/Catholic Family Ministries, Inc. (2014, 2015, 2016, 2017, 2018, 2021, 2022, 2023)
- Christ or Chaos (2014, 2015, 2016, 2017, 2018, 2021, 2022, 2023)
- Culture Wars/Fidelity Press (2021, 2022, 2023)
- IHM Media (2014, 2015, 2016, 2017, 2018)
- IHS Press (2014, 2015, 2016, 2017, 2018)
- In the Spirit of Chartres Committee (2014, 2015, 2016, 2017, 2018, 2021, 2022, 2023)
- Most Holy Family Monastery (2014, 2015, 2016)
- OMNI Christian Book Club (2014, 2015, 2016)
- Robert Sungenis (2015, 2016, 2017, 2018) – leader of Catholic Apologetics International
- Slaves of the Immaculate Heart of Mary (2014, 2015, 2016, 2017, 2018, 2021, 2022, 2023)
- St. Michael's Parish/Mount St. Michael (2014, 2015)
- The Fatima Crusader/International Fatima Rosary Crusade (2014, 2015, 2016, 2017, 2018, 2021, 2022, 2023)
- The Remnant/The Remnant Press (2014, 2015, 2016, 2017, 2018, 2021, 2022, 2023)
- Tradition in Action (2014, 2015, 2016, 2017, 2018, 2021, 2022, 2023)

==== "Other" ====
===== Black separatist and black nationalist =====
Number of black separatist hate groups listed over time
| Year | Number listed |
|---|---|
| 2003 | 136 |
| 2004 | 108 |
| 2005 | 106 |
| 2006 | 88 |
| 2007 | 81 |
| 2008 | 112 |
| 2009 | 121 |
| 2010 | 149 |
| 2011 | 140 |
| 2012 | 151 |
| 2013 | 115 |
| 2014 | 113 |
| 2015 | 180 |
| 2016 | 193 |
| 2017 | 233 |
| 2018 | 264 |

Black nationalist groups espouse black separatism, which seeks to create separate institutions for black people. In 2019 the SPLC noted: "The black nationalist movement is a reaction to centuries of institutionalized white supremacy in America. Black nationalists believe the answer to white racism is to form separate institutions — or even a separate nation. Most forms of black nationalism are strongly anti-white, antisemitic and anti-LGBT. Some religious versions assert that black people are the biblical 'chosen people' of God."

In October 2020, the SPLC announced that they would no longer use the category of "Black Separatism", in order to foster a more accurate understanding of violent extremism and to avoid creating a false equivalency between Black Separatism and White supremacist extremism.

Many groups previously listed under the black separatist/nationalist category are now listed under "general hate" category. The following black separatist/nationalist groups were listed in the SPLC's annual reports under either category (years in parentheses are the year(s) in which the group was included):

- Ambassadors of Christ (2017, 2018, 2021, 2022)
- Ancient Egyptian Distribution Company (2017, 2018)
- Army of Israel (2017, 2018, 2021, 2022)
- Black Hebrew Israelites (2015)
- Black Riders Liberation Party (2014, 2015, 2016, 2017, 2018, 2021, 2022)
- Great Millstone (2017, 2018, 2021, 2022)
- House of David/House of David Camp (2017, 2018, 2021, 2022)
- House of Israel (2017, 2018, 2021, 2022)
- International Society of Indigenous Sovereigns (2018. 2021)
- Israel United In Christ (2015, 2016, 2017, 2018, 2021, 2022)
- Israelite Church of God in Jesus Christ, The (2014, 2015, 2016, 2017, 2018)
- Israelite School of Universal Practical Knowledge (2015, 2016, 2017, 2018, 2021, 2022)
- Israelite the Branches (2018)
- Israelite Saints of Christ (2018)
- Lion of Judah - Jeshurun Lions (2018, 2021, 2022)
- Lions of Israel (2017)
- Luxor Couture (2018, 2021, 2022)
- Masharah Yasharahla - Government of Israel (2018, 2021, 2022)
- Mountains of Israel (2018, 2022)
- National Black Foot Soldier Network (2014)
- Nation of Kings and Priests (2017, 2018, 2021, 2022)
- New Black Liberation Militia (2018)
- New Black Panther Party (2014, 2015, 2016, 2017, 2018, 2021, 2022)
- New Black Panther Party for Self Defense (2016, 2017, 2018, 2021)
- Northern Kingdom Prophets (2018, 2021)
- OneBody in Yahawashi (2017, 2018, 2021, 2022)
- Revolutionary Black Panther Party (2018, 2021, 2022)
- Sicarii 1715 (2016, 2017, 2018, 2021, 2022)
- True National Israelite Congregation (previously listed as "True Nation Israelite Congregation") (2018, 2021, 2022)
- Trumpet in Philly (2018)
- United Kingdom of Israel Congregation (2017, 2018)
- United Nuwaupians Worldwide, The/All Eyes on Egipt (formerly listed as "All Eyes on Egypt Bookstore or All Eyes on Egipt Bookstore" and "United Nuwaubian Nation of Moors/All Eyes on Egipt") (2014, 2015, 2016, 2017, 2018, 2021)
- War On The Horizon/Straight Black Pride Movement (formerly listed as simply "War On The Horizon") (2014, 2015, 2016, 2017, 2018, 2021, 2022)
- Watchmen of Israel (2018)
- Watchmen for Israel (2021, 2022)
- United Sabaeans Worldwide, The (2021, 2022)

===== Other =====
- 211 Bootboys (2017, 2018)
- a2z Publications (2014, 2015, 2016, 2017, 2018)
- Active Democracy (2015, 2016)
- Aggressive Christianity (2014, 2015, 2016, 2017) – was also listed in the anti-Muslim category
- American Clarion (2016, 2017)
- American Free Press (2014, 2015, 2016, 2017, 2018, 2021, 2022)
- American Freedom Alliance (2022)
- American Guard (2017, 2018)
- American Reformation Front (2021, 2022)
- Artisan Publishers (2014, 2015)
- As-Sabiqun / Masjid al Islam (2014, 2015, 2016, 2017, 2018, 2021) - initially listed separately, then together (also listed as "Masjid al Islam – As Sabiqun")
- Bill Keller Ministries (2014, 2015, 2016, 2017, 2018, 2021, 2022)
- Bomb Islam (2021, 2022)
- The Brother Nathanael Foundation (2014, 2015, 2016, 2017, 2018, 2021, 2022)
- Chick Publications (2014, 2015, 2016, 2017, 2018, 2021, 2022)
- Christian Action Network (2022) - formerly listed in anti-Muslim section
- Christian Anti-Defamation Commission (2014, 2015, 2016)
- Christian Ministries (2015)
- Concerned Citizens and Friends of Illegal Immigration Law Enforcement (2017, 2018)
- Cultural Studies Press (2014, 2015, 2016, 2017, 2018)
- Dixie Giftshop (2018, 2021, 2022)
- Dove World Outreach Center (2014)
- European-American Evangelistic Crusade (2014, 2015, 2016, 2017, 2018, 2021, 2022)
- Fraternal Order of Alt-Knights (2017)
- Fundamentalist Latter Day Saints (2014, 2015, 2016, 2017, 2018)
- Geauga Constitutional Council (2014, 2015)
- Hatreon (2017, 2018)
- Hell Shaking Street Preachers (2018)
- Holy Nation of Odin (2014, 2015, 2016)
- Insight USA (2014, 2015, 2016, 2017, 2018, 2021, 2022)
- Invictus Books (2014, 2015, 2016)
- Israelites Saints of Christ (2021, 2022)
- Jamaat al-Muslimeen (2014, 2015, 2016, 2017, 2018)
- Jewish Defense League (2014, 2015, 2016, 2017, 2018)
- Jewish Task Force (2016, 2017, 2018, 2021, 2022)
- Kingston Group (2017, 2018)
- Last Frontier Evangelism (formerly listed as "Last Frontier Evangelism – Repent Alaska") (2017, 2018, 2021)
- Lordship Church (of Bonners Ferry, Idaho) (2015, 2016, 2017, 2018, 2021)
- National Prayer Network (2014, 2015, 2016)
- Nationalist Liberty Union (2018)
- New Nation Productions (2015)
- Official Street Preachers (2014, 2015, 2016, 2017, 2018, 2021, 2022)
- Ozark Craft LC (2014, 2016, 2017, 2018)
- Patriot Movement AZ (2018)
- Power of Prophecy (2014, 2015, 2016, 2017, 2018, 2021, 2022)
- Protect Texas Kids (2022)
- Proud Boys (2017, 2018, 2021, 2022)
- RAIR Foundation USA (2021, 2022)
- Reformation-Bible Puritan-Baptist Church/Vatican Assassins (2014, 2015, 2016, 2017, 2018)
- Rense Radio Network (2015, 2016, 2017, 2018, 2021, 2022)
- Repent Amarillo (2015, 2016)
- Rooshv.com (2021, 2022)
- Samanta Roy Institute of Science and Technology (2014, 2015, 2016, 2017, 2018)
- Sharkhunters International (2014, 2015, 2016, 2017, 2018)
- Society for the Practical Establishment and Perpetuation of the Ten Commandments (2014, 2015)
- Sons of Aesir Motorcycle Club (2014, 2015)
- Sons of Liberty Media (formerly You Can Run But You Cannot Hide International) (2014, 2016, 2017, 2018, 2021, 2022) – listed in anti-LGBT category in 2014 and the general hate category thereafter
- Tea Party Nation (2014, 2015)
- The Church at Kaweah (2014)
- The Dakota Voice (2014, 2015)
- Thomas More Law Center (2021, 2022)
- Tony Alamo Christian Ministries (2014, 2015, 2016, 2017, 2018)
- Truth At Last (2014, 2015)
- TruNews (2021, 2022)
- White Pride Home School Resource Center (2014, 2015)

== See also ==
- Hate crime
- Hate speech
- Xenophobia in the United States
