= Alli =

Alli is a surname, a unisex given name, and a feminine given name. As a Finnish feminine given name, Alli means "old squaw, long-tailed duck." Notable people with the name include:

== Surname ==
- Ambrose Folorunsho Alli (1929–1989), Nigerian academic and politician
- Antero Alli (1952–2023), Finnish-American astrologer
- Chris Alli (1944–2023), Nigerian soldier and army chief
- Darogha Ubbas Alli (19th century), Indian engineer and photographer
- Dele Alli (born 1996), British football player
- Juan Cruz Alli (born 1942), Spanish politician
- Millenic Alli (born 2000), Irish professional footballer
- Mosi Alli (born 1961), Tanzanian sprinter
- Paolo Alli (born 1950), Italian politician
- Roberto Jiménez Alli (born 1973), Spanish politician
- Sharafadeen Alli (born 1963), Nigerian lawyer and politician
- Taiwo Babatunde Alli (born 1969), Nigerian entrepreneur
- Tylease Alli, American government official
- Victor Alli, English actor
- Waheed Alli, Baron Alli (born 1964), British media entrepreneur and politician
- Wale Musa Alli (born 2000), Nigerian footballer
- Yusuf Alli (born 1960), Nigerian long jumper

== Given name ==
=== Male ===
- Alli Abrew (born 1974), American football player
- Alli Adeyemi (born 1964), Nigerian politician
- Alli Austria (born 1990), Filipino basketball player
- Alli Muhammad (born 1968), African-American doctor
- Alli N'Dri (born 1984), Ivorian footballer

=== Female ===
- Alli Haapasalo (born 1977), Finnish film director and screenwriter
- Alli Lahtinen (1926–1976), Finnish politician
- Alli Linnehan (born 1999), American volleyball player
- Alli Lipsher (born 1986), American soccer player
- Alli Macuga (born 2003), American freestyle skier
- Alli Mauzey, American actress
- Alli Nissinen (1866–1926), Finnish educator
- Alli Owens (born 1988), American racing driver
- Alli Paasikivi (1879–1960), First Lady of Finland (1946–1956)
- Alli Palisch (born 1994), Irish footballer
- Alli Raani, Legendary Tamil queen of the Sangam period
- Alli Ragan (born 1992), American freestyle wrestler
- Alli Schroder (born 2002), Canadian baseball player and firefighter
- Alli Simpson (born 1998 or 1999), Australian singer-songwriter and television personality
- Alli Trygg-Helenius (1852–1926), Finnish temperance advocate
- Alli Vaittinen-Kuikka (1918–2006), Finnish nurse, midwife and politician
- Alli Walker (born 1989), Canadian country musician
- Alli Webb, American author
- Alli Willow, French-Brazilian actress

=== Fictional characters ===
- Alli Bhandari, in the Canadian television drama Degrassi: The Next Generation, played by Melinda Shankar
