= Sadistic Souls Motorcycle Club =

White supremacist outlaw motorcycle club

Sadistic Souls MC
- Abbreviation: ANSSMC; SSMC
- Founded: 2010
- Founded at: Wood River, Illinois, U.S.
- Type: Outlaw motorcycle club, hate group
- Region served: United States, Australia, New Zealand, South Africa, Great Britain, Germany, Sweden, Denmark, Norway, Netherlands
- President: Dennis McGiffen
- Affiliations: Aryan Nations, United Klans of America, Creativity
- Website: www.sadisticsoulsmc.org

The Aryan Nations Sadistic Souls Motorcycle Club, also known as Sadistic Souls MC, is a white supremacist outlaw motorcycle club founded in 2010. Since 2014, they have been listed as an active neo-Nazi group in annual reports conducted by the Southern Poverty Law Center.

According to their official website, the club claims to be the "militant arm" of Aryan Nations.

== Formation ==
After serving a seven-year prison sentence for federal weapons charges, ex-Ku Klux Klan member Dennis Michael McGiffen formed the Sadistic Souls Motorcycle Club (SSMC) in 2010 with the intention of the group to act as the militant wing of the North American-based Aryan Nations neo-Nazi organization. McGiffen has continuously served as the National President of SSMC since founding it. The club's colors are black and silver.

In July 2012, SSMC formally merged with Aryan Nations. It is currently known as Aryan Nations Sadistic Souls MC.

The club has chapters in Illinois, Oklahoma, Missouri, Wisconsin, Florida, Pennsylvania, Alabama, Ohio, North Carolina and Tennessee as well as Australia, Sweden, Germany, South Africa, the United Kingdom (England, Scotland) and New Zealand. They also have a nomad-style chapter of members who sport a bottom rocker of the word "vagabond" on the backs of their kuttes.

== Ideology ==
The Sadistic Souls claim to accept any white nationalist regardless of religious belief.

On its official website, the club claims that forced integration is "deliberate and malicious genocide, particularly for a people like the white race, who are now a small minority in the world."

Their club's motto, "The Black & Silver Solution"', is the phrase given to represent a coalition of several racist organizations with the United Klans of America and The Creativity Movement.

== Imagery ==
Like many other white supremacist and racist skinhead groups, the Aryan Nations Sadistic Souls MC uses various Wehrmacht insignia, including the Totenkopf, the Reichsadler, the doppelte Siegrune and the Nationalflagge.

Since the club's merger with Aryan Nations, many of the SSMC members can be seen wearing a patch of the Aryan Nations logo, which consists of a Wolfsangel symbol with a sword replacing the crossbar.

== See also ==
- Aryan Nations Motorcycle Riders Division
- List of organizations designated by the Southern Poverty Law Center as hate groups
