= Black Riders Liberation Party =

Black nationalist revolutionary organization

- Chairperson: Mischa Culton ("General TACO")
- Founded: 1996
- Headquarters: Los Angeles, California
- Ideology: Black nationalism Revolutionary socialism
- Colors: Red and black

The Black Riders Liberation Party (BRLP) is a black nationalist organization based in the United States. The group claims ideological continuity with the original Black Panther Party for Self-Defense and, according to its official website, organizes gang members to "stop commiting [sic] genocide against each other and to stand up against white supremacy and capitalist oppression."

== History ==
=== Establishment ===
The Black Riders Liberation Party traces its origins back to a class conducted at the Youth Training School in Chino, California, conducted by the California Youth Authority for prisoners in the California state penal system. Among these was Mischa Culton, an individual also using the noms de guerre "General T.A.C.O.," an acronym for Taking All Capitalists Out, and "Wolverine Shakur." Inspired by the historic example of the Black Panther Party for Self-Defense, upon his release from prison in 1996 Culton sought to build a new political organization by gathering others from the predominantly African-American ghettos of South Central Los Angeles and Watts.

At some point after his release from prison, Mischa Culton had been a member of New African American Vanguard Movement (later known as the New Panther Vanguard Movement), a Los Angeles group led by members of the original Black Panther Party. However, Culton was dissatisfied with NAAVM's lack of willingness to confront the policy and thus set out to create a more aggressive group, leading to what became the Black Riders Liberation Party.

The fledgling organization started by Culton was energized by a November 17, 1997 police shooting of a mentally troubled black man in the Jordan Downs housing complex in Watts, a suicidal individual who had lunged at officers with a butter knife. The result was a vigilance program given the provocative moniker "Watch a Pig," which encouraged citizens "standing a legal distance from the pigs and making sure they don't brutalize the people," in the words of the group's "Minister of Public Relations."

=== Development ===
Originally limited to Southern California, in 2010 a section of the organization based in Oakland, California was initiated.

In November 2012 the BRLP launched a mass organization called the Inter-Communal Solidarity Committee in Los Angeles, attempting to build broader support for a common program. The new front group was inspired by the National Committee to Combat Fascism (NCCF) of the Black Panther Party, according to a representative of the organization.

In March 2015 the BRLP decided to take advantage of the open gun carrying law in Texas, traveling to Austin to conduct an armed march to the Texas state capitol together with the Huey P. Newton Gun Club. Held in conjunction with the heavily attended South by Southwest conference, the joint march was conducted in an effort to "raise the cry for armed self-defense" by the black community, according to the marchers.

== Ideology ==
The group styles itself as an organization of "black revolutionaries" engaged in a "people's war" against a white-dominated "oppressive capitalistic system." The group advocates on behalf of civil rights and social justice and actively seeks to end gang violence so as to "change gang mentality into revolutionary mentality."

The BRLP professes a belief in the ideas of revolutionary socialism, and on May Day 2012 were part of a small and ineffectual "General Strike" effort in Los Angeles. The group claimed that their May 1 participation was met with retaliation by government authorities, who are said to have burst into the home of party leader Mischa Culton two days later with automatic rifles during what was later explained as a routine "compliance check" by the California Department of Corrections and Rehabilitation.

The Black Riders have adopted a party manifesto known as the Black Commune program which put forward many of the demands of the original 1966 Ten-Point Program, with the addition of new demands (for the proper medical care of AIDS sufferers and an end to the trade in crack cocaine in the black community).

The group's founder and chief theoretician, Mischa Culton, has called Barack Obama, the first African-American President of the United States, the "ultimate neocolonial puppet" and "the grand House Negro" and declared that the American government and political system was "designed to enslave, massacre, and genocide our people out of this country."

Culton advocates for an autonomous, black-directed movement, encouraging sympathetic whites to fight against police abuse and the ideology of white supremacy. In a 2015 interview with Vice magazine, he declared:

"It's important that black people are allowed to define themselves and their struggle, for outsiders not to come in and co-opt or water down our righteous revolutionary rage. The main way is to ride on the pigs, to go against the pigs. You've gotta study the history of John Brown, 'cause if you're not John Brown, you might as well get out of town."

=== Hate group ===
As of 2020, the Black Riders Liberation Party has been included on the list of hate groups by Southern Poverty Law Center. In 2018, BRLP leader and New Black Panther Party (NBPP) leader Samir Shabazz introduced himself by saying:

The white man is the devil. Let’s get right down to business. In 2018, any negro coon lips and dares say all white people aren’t bad should be sent to a psychiatric hospital and diagnosed with slavery syndrome or you should do the inevitable to yourself.

=== Programs and publications ===
In addition to its "Watch a Pig" police monitoring campaign, the BRLP conducts ideological training under the slogan "Educate 2 Liberate" and maintains what it calls the "Break the Lock Prisoner Support" program.

The BRLP launched its own newspaper in 2012, the eponymous Black Riders Liberation Party.

== In popular culture ==
The group was the subject of a 2013 documentary film, Let Um Hear Ya Coming.

== See also ==
- List of organizations designated by the Southern Poverty Law Center as hate groups
- New Black Panther Party
