= Matti Helenius-Seppälä =

Finnish politician

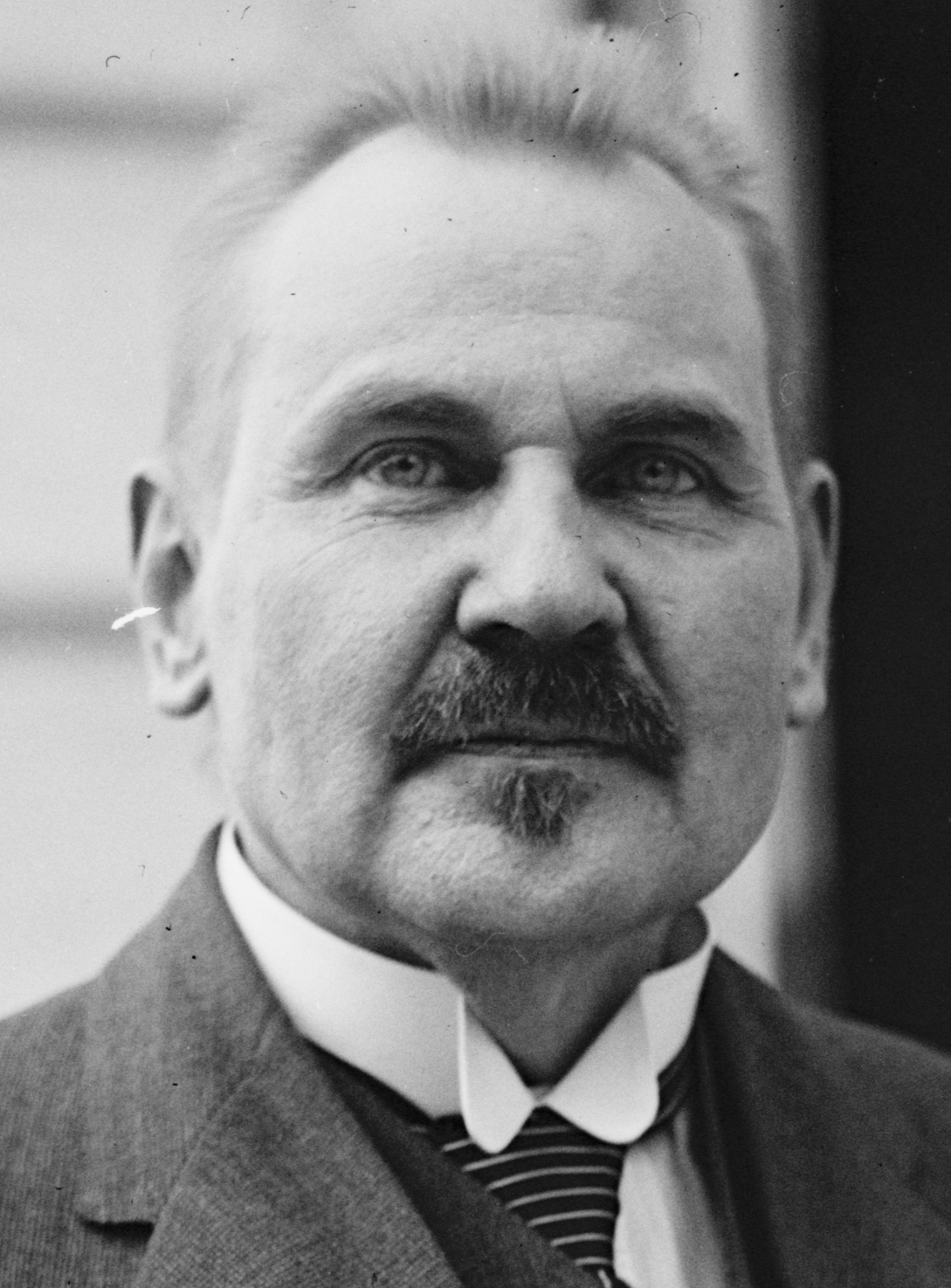
Helenius-Seppälä photographed shortly before his death in 1920

Matti Oskar Helenius-Seppälä (27 June 1870, Pälkäne – 18 October 1920) was a Finnish social scientist, temperance movement activist and politician. He was a member of the Parliament of Finland from 1908 to 1909, from 1911 to 1914, in 1917 and from 1919 to 1920, representing the Christian Workers' Union of Finland (SKrTL). He was married to the temperance activist and social worker, Alli Trygg-Helenius.

== Life ==
=== Early life ===
Matti Helenius' parents were the tanner and butcher Matti Helenius and Erika Adolfintytär. Though his family was poor, having thirteen children, Matti managed to enter the Hämeenlinna Lyceum in 1880 at the age of ten, which was the only Finnish-language normal lyceum in the country. He soon was one of the best students in his class, becoming a fluent writer. During his school days, he wrote for Hämeen Sanomat and the satirical magazine Matti Meikäläinen. He additionally gave private lessons, at one point to the grandchildren of Zacharias Topelius in Koivuniemi, Sipoo. Helenius completed his matriculation examination in 1888 and his Bachelor of Philosophy degree in 1894, though his studies were slowed down by working at the same time. From 1890 to 1892 he worked as an assistant editor for the magazine Uusi Suometer.

=== Sobriety Work and Alcohol Research ===
Helenius took a vow of abstinence at the Kuopio General Temperance Meeting in 1886 and joined the Temperance Society in 1888. He first met his future wife, Alli Trygg, in January 1890, where both were invited to give lectures on abstinence at Kangasala Folk High School. Following this, Trygg used Helenius' help in many practical matters, such as translating his Swedish texts into Finnish. Their collaboration and friendship deepened until the couple married in 1897, despite an 18-year age difference. It is likely that the union remained childless because of Trygg's age. Both spouses' personalities have been described as largely different. They edited Kansan Lehti together from 1892 to 1896 and published a book based on a joint lecture series, Mitä tiede sanoo väkijuomista?, in 1897. The book presented abstinence as a broad social issue.

Helenius then delved into the study of alcohol, his work eventually expanding into a doctoral dissertation. He defended his doctorate in political science from the University of Copenhagen in 1902 with his thesis Alkoholspørgsmaalet. En sociologisk-statistik Undersøgelse. In his thesis, Helenius showed that completely sober people lived longer than moderate drinkers using mortality statistics from insurance companies in different countries. According to him, even moderate alcohol consumption was dangerous and, in light of statistics, alcohol caused more harm than all other poisons combined. The dissertation was translated into Finnish, Swedish, German and Polish.

Helenius wanted his research to be included in temperance education in schools, and for this purpose published the booklet Alkoholin vaikutukset, which was translated into at least ten different languages in 1903. The document was intended to present scientific facts on the subject of temperance and be applicable to both students and teachers and was written in collaboration with Alli Trygg. In their temperance education work, the couple combined Helenius' scientific expertise with Trygg's ability to approach people directly, especially children. Helenius published a revised version of the book ten years later under the title Alkoholioppi. He wrote a large number of scientific articles and reports and gave a large number of lectures both in Finland and abroad. He became a direct authority on alcohol issues.

He is buried in the Hietaniemi Cemetery in Helsinki.
