= Demokraatti =

Finnish magazine

Demokraatti (Finnish pronunciation: [ˈdemoˌkrɑːtːi]) is a Finnish-language magazine and Social Democratic Party organ published 23 times a year in Helsinki, Finland.

== History and profile ==
Demokraatti was established in 1895. Its name in the beginning was Työmies (lit. 'The Workman', 1895–1918), and its other former names are Suomen Sosialidemokraatti (1918–1988), Demari (1988–2001) and Uutispäivä Demari (2001–2012). The paper is headquartered in Helsinki and is the organ of the Social Democratic Party.

In late 1997, another social democratic paper, Turun Päivälehti, merged with Demokraatti.

The circulation of Demokraatti was 11,243 copies in 2014.
