= Alli Trygg-Helenius =

Finnish temperance advocate

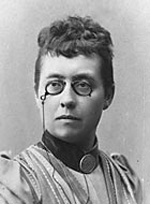
- Born: Alli Trygg; 16 July 1852; Raisio, Finland
- Died: 2 December 1926 (aged 74); Helsinki, Finland
- Occupations: Teacher; temperance activist; women’s leader
- Spouse: Matti Helenius-Seppälä

Alli Trygg-Helenius (1852–1926) was a Finnish activist who worked with the temperance movement at the beginning of the 20th century, focusing especially on temperance work with children. In addition, she was a pioneer of the women's movement in Finland and a social activist responsible for the establishment of several organizations. Trygg-Helenius was the spouse and close colleague of Matti Helenius-Seppälä, who was influential in the temperance movement and the Christian labour movement.

== Early life ==
Maria Alexandra (Alli) Trygg was born on 16 July 1852 in Raisio in south-western Finland. Her parents were Captain Carl Oskar Trygg and Elisabet Alexandra Reis. She was the only girl of five children and spent her childhood in the countryside of Raisio as her family owned several farms. Her father had been in military service in Russia from 1855 and, after their mother's death in 1868, the children moved to the town of Oulu to live with their uncle, a saddler. Trygg first attended a German school in Turku in Finland, before continuing her studies in Oulu and then training to be a teacher in Ekenäs, graduating in 1874. Her father, who suffered bankruptcy, died in an explosion in 1888. Trygg fell in love with a cousin, son of the uncle who had taken the family in, and they were engaged to be married, but he died of typhoid.

== Teaching career ==
Trygg worked as a teacher for twenty years, at the Fagervik Ruukki School in Inkoo from 1874 to 1880 and in a working-class district of the Finnish capital of Helsinki from 1880 to 1894. On Sundays in Fagervik she gave lessons to the parents and was also the church organist. In addition to teaching, she earned extra income as a journalist. Although Trygg was from a Swedish-speaking family, she became an ardent supporter of the Fennoman movement the Finnish nationalism movement. However, she never learned to speak flawless Finnish.

== Women's movement ==
Trygg's activities were motivated by a strong religious belief. She became involved in the temperance movement and the women's movement, both of which she believed were capable of solving social problems. In 1884, she co-founded the Finnish Women's Association and was the first editor-in-chief of the association's Swedish-language publication, Hemmet och Samhället, in 1889–1890. In 1887 she gave a speech to the association on women's suffrage, which was considered shocking by most of the other participants and was not even recorded in the minutes of the meeting. She later began to distance herself from the cautious line of the Women's Association and moved to a new kind of activism involving more concrete action, although she maintained her membership in the organization until the last years of her life. Trygg corresponded with Uno Cygnaeus, considered the father of the Finnish public school system, and with the rector of the University of Helsinki, Zachris Topelius, among others she had met during various seminars. In 1877, she took a trip to Copenhagen with a travel grant organized by Cygnaeus.

== Temperance activities ==
A significant turning point in Trygg's life was her trip to Newcastle in England in 1887, where she was shocked by the poverty, and to the US in 1888, during which she participated with Aleksandra Gripenberg in the first meeting of the International Council of Women in Washington, D.C. as representatives of the Finnish Women's Association. In the United States, Trygg met, among others, Frances Willard, a leading member of the temperance movement. Trygg adopted the idea of sobriety from her and returned to Finland in her own words as a "new person". Upon her return, she sought to organize a women's Christian temperance movement in Finland. She invited Mary Greenleaf Clement Leavitt of the US Woman's Christian Temperance Union to tell Finnish women about the organization's work, which eventually led to the founding in 1904 of the Finnish White Ribbon Association to oppose alcohol. Trygg was also probably the first Finnish woman to become familiar with YMCA and YWCA activities, learning about these organizations during a visit to Stockholm in 1888. In November 1895, Trygg took part in the founding meeting for the Finnish YWCA in Helsinki.

In 1894, Trygg left her teaching job to focus on temperance education for children and youth, as she was convinced that it would be most effective way of warning of the dangers of alcohol "in a timely manner". She founded the Commonwealth Society of Hope, an organization based on the English model Band of Hope. In 1894, Trygg also founded children's temperance magazines called Eos and Koitto, which she edited until her death. She also edited other magazines around the same time. Trygg also founded the Finnish Teachers' Sobriety Association and in 1909 the Finnish Christian Sobriety Association. She came up with the idea of temperance writing competitions in schools, which were held over for a century. Trygg also participated as an expert in temperance work in Sweden and Estonia.

== Social work ==
In 1889 Trygg established a soup kitchen in Sörnäinen, Helsinki, as a competitor to the taverns that offered strong alcohol. This offered affordable food and a home-made beer known as "Alli's beer". There was also a reading room. It was the first attempt to improve the social status of the working population in the workers' districts of Helsinki. In the following year, she established the Sörnäinen People's Home, which was intended to be the centre of the intellectual and social life of the working population. It became the centre for many associations and hobbies in the area. The two-storey wooden building of the people's home was inaugurated in November 1890. It was a multi-purpose building, with a library, which went on to become the Kallio Library, a kindergarten, classrooms, an alcohol-free brewery, a cooperative, an employment agency and premises for workers' organizations. In addition, Trygg herself lived in the attic of the house in the early years. The Sörnäinen Workers' Association was founded on the premises of the people's home in 1894, and the founding of the Työmies magazine, the organ of the Social Democratic Party of Finland took place there.

Under the leadership of Trygg, the Servants' Association was established in 1898 to improve the conditions of domestic servants. She became its first president. As a result, she was openly resented by conservatives and handed over the presidency to Miina Sillanpää three years later. Her interest in labour issues and activities of the working classes distinguished her from many of those in the early women's movement. She was also willing to personally assist those in need.

== Cooperation with Matti Helenius-Seppälä ==
Trygg married Matti Helenius-Seppälä in 1897. They had first met in 1890 when they both addressed a temperance meeting. They became good friends and Trygg helped Helenius by translating his writings. The marriage aroused surprise and disapproval, as her husband was almost 18 years younger than his spouse. They moved between several apartments and houses, often providing accommodation for those in need, such as Estonian refugees. Matti Helenius travelled extensively abroad, did scientific research on the issue of alcohol, and from 1902 served as secretary to the Friends of Sobriety and later as a member parliament for the Christian Workers' Union of Finland. His main goal was to bring about a ban on alcohol. The couple participated in temperance work together and published in 1897 a book based on a joint lecture series, What Does Science Say About Spirits?, which described the health effects of alcohol and presented sobriety as a broad societal issue. In 1903, a scientific educational guide for children on the effects of alcohol followed, which also became a textbook for teacher training. From the beginning of the 20th century, the couple were the undisputed leaders of the Finnish temperance and prohibition law movement. As a result, they were subjected to a wide range of ridicule and harassment. Helenius-Seppälä died on his way home from the United States in 1920.

== Death ==
Trygg died on 2 December 1926 in Helsinki. She was buried at the Hietaniemi cemetery, next to her husband. A park bears her name in Helsinki. An annual award is now given in her name by the Finnish Settlement movement.
