= Huey P. Newton Gun Club =

- Co-founders: Babu Omowale; Yafeuh Balogun; Rakem Balogun
- Founded: August 20, 2014
- Headquarters: Dallas, Texas, United States
- Ideology: Black Power; Black nationalism Gun rights Anti-capitalism
- Slogan: Freedom

Website
- hueypnewtongunclub.org

The Huey P. Newton Gun Club is a self-defense group named after Black Panther Party co-founder and Minister of Defense Huey P. Newton.

The group teaches self-defense and has staged armed protests in favor of African American gun rights and against police brutality. The club was founded by Rakem Balogun, Yafeuh Balogun and Babu Omowale.

The group garnered national attention in August 2014 for its open carry patrols. Yafeuh Balogun expressed the hope that the club would continue to grow and eventually become a mainstream gun-rights organization.

== Activity ==
In August 2014, the Huey P. Newton Gun Club staged their first openly armed patrol through a predominantly black neighborhood in South Dallas, where police killed an unarmed black man named James Harper in 2012. Since then, Balogun reported that donations to the club have poured in from around the country, and their membership has more than doubled. The club staged another protest in October of the same year.

In 2016, the coalition held a counter-protest at the Muhammad Mosque in South Dallas in response to a demonstration by the anti-Islamic Bureau of American Islamic Relations (BAIR). Both parties were armed and police were present during the protest, which ended shortly without any violence.

Also in 2016, both Rakem and Yafeuh Balogun distanced themselves from the organisation. Rakem Balogun has cited the growing influence of the New Black Panther Party, whom he deemed a Black Separatist group, over the group as the reason for their departure. However, during a 2019 interview on Klepper, Rakem Balogun is seen leading a demonstration including three participants in Huey P. Newton Gun Club paraphernalia. Due to the disagreement in the direction the club was taking the Huey P. Newton Gun Club Alpha company was formed by Yafeuh Balogun, as a way to adhere to the original socialist and intercommunal ideology of the Black Panther Party, in particular Huey P. Newton.

In May 2019, nine armed members appeared at a demonstration in Dayton, Ohio.

== See also ==
- Black Riders Liberation Party
- Redneck Revolt
- Revolutionary Black Panther Party
- Socialist Rifle Association
