= Rakem Balogun =

American activist

Rakem Balogun Bigot
- Born: Christopher Daniels
- Military career
- Allegiance: United States
- Branch: United States Marine Corps
- Service years: 2001 - 2004
- Conflicts: Iraq War

Rakem Balogun, whose legal name is Christopher Daniels, is an American activist, best known for his involvement in a Facebook-related incident that occurred on December 12, 2017, which became headline news in the United States.

== Background ==
Balogun enlisted as a US Marine in 2001 and served in the Iraq War in 2003. Balogun cites his time serving in the US Marine Corps as alienating due to the behaviour and racial attitudes of white officers, and left the Marine Corps 3 years into an 8-year contract on an "Other Than Honorable" discharge . Balogun became a founding member of groups such as Guerrilla Mainframe in 2016 after a fallout with the Huey P. Newton Gun Club which he allegedly co-founded in 2014, both based in Dallas, Texas. Balogun cites the killing of unarmed black men by police officers as the motivation for creating these groups. In 2016, Balogun distanced himself from the Huey P. Newton Gun Club, as he felt it had become too influenced by New Black Panther Party (also based in Dallas), which he identifies as being a Black Separatist organisation, something which clashed with his Socialist outlook. However, during a 2019 interview on Klepper, Balogun is seen leading a demonstration including several participants in Huey P. Newton Gun Club paraphernalia.

== 2017 arrest ==
In November 2017, agents found out Balogun was in possession of a firearm, compelling a warrant for his arrest, because he was a prohibited person, due to a domestic violence conviction for assault against his ex-girlfriend.

Balogun was startled awake in his Dallas home by a large crash and police officers screaming commands on December 12, 2017, when he and his 15-year-old son were forced outside of their Dallas home dressed only in their underwear. Balogun was handcuffed and learned FBI agents were investigating domestic terrorism and had been monitoring him for years for posts on Facebook criticizing police and praising Micah Johnson, the perpetrator of the 2016 shooting of Dallas police officers. Balogun's firearm violation as well as his posts were cited as grounds for Balogun's arrest. According to Balogun he was exercising his right to free speech when he praised Johnson, and was not endorsing violence against individual police officers, but a general struggle against the Dallas Police Department.

The event made worldwide news due to Balogun being the first person to be publicly designated a "Black Identity Extremist" by the FBI, sparking a national debate on the appropriateness of that term. In May 2018, Balogun had all charges dropped against him.
