= Ralph Ovadal =

American pastor

Ralph Ovadal is the pastor of Pilgrims Covenant Church in Monroe, Wisconsin and is known for controversial views and opposition to modern Bible translations, the Roman Catholic Church, homosexuality, and abortion.

Ovadal has called the pope the "antichrist" and asserts that the Catholic Church has masterminded a plot "to turn Protestant America into a Roman Catholic country" by "aiding and abetting the criminal invasion of America from Mexico".

Ovadal has endorsed The Pink Swastika, a book that asserts that homosexuals "conceived, organized and controlled" the Nazi Party. The Southern Poverty Law Center, which tracks extremist groups in the United States, has listed Pilgrims Covenant Church as an anti-LGBT hate group.

According to Ovadal's church, Ovadal was arrested "approximately 120 times" between November 1988 and May 1992 for physically blocking entrances to abortion clinics, mostly on charges of disorderly conduct and trespass.

Ovadal was an avowed opponent of a nude beach called Mazo Beach near Mazomanie which in 2012 was one of the top five most popular nude beaches in the US; the beach was closed in 2016. Ovadal began his protests against nudity in the parking lot of the beach in 2000, and on May 28, 2001, Ovadal led a group of protestors who called for a woman in the beach's parking lot to repent, and called her "'harlot", and" whore" and "Jezebel". After the woman filed a complaint, Ovadal was charged with disorderly conduct and subsequently convicted, a $1,000 fine being levied against him.
