= Pacifica Forum =

The Pacifica Forum
- Formation: 1994
- Type: Discussion group
- Purpose: To provide information and perspective on the issues of war and peace
- Location: Eugene, Oregon
- Host: Orval Etter
- Website: pacificaforum.org

The Pacifica Forum was a discussion group in Eugene, Oregon, United States. It was hosted by retired University of Oregon professor Orval Etter until his death, after which it disbanded. It was criticized for promoting antisemitic views.

== Purpose ==
According to the group's founder, Orval Etter, the Pacifica Forum's purpose was to "provide information and points of view" on "war and peace, militarism and pacifism, violence and non-violence." The group was named the Pacifica Forum after a San Francisco-area supper club that had discussed similar issues.

When it was founded in 1994, the Pacifica Forum had a generally left-wing orientation. Later, it also hosted right-wing speakers. Two regular members and presenters at the forum broke off ties with PF via a guest opinion in the Eugene Register-Guard that expressed very tepid criticism of having a neo-Nazi like Mark Weber as a lecturer along with a much more intensive and passionate overview of how the extremist slant would hurt efforts to focus on the evils of Zionism.

After hosting two Holocaust deniers, it was listed as a hate group by the Southern Poverty Law Center (SPLC). A 2008 report by the SPLC stated, "The number of people attending Pacifica Forum meetings is less than half what it was two years ago — and it's mostly a different crowd. Among those who left were Mariah Leung and Jack Dresser, who regularly made presentations on Israel and Palestine as well as on other topics related to war, peace and justice. Dresser, a former Army psychologist during the Vietnam War, told the Intelligence Report that after the Anelauskas lectures, he spoke to Pacifica Forum attendees about the psychology of racism and its consequences, showing photos of lynchings and anti-Jewish Nazi propaganda posters. "Since Pacifica Forum is a public forum, Mariah and I had no objection to attendance by the self-described 'white separatists' and even entertained some hope of modifying their views," he emailed. "However, we could not allow them any control of programming in a forum with which our names were regularly associated. Orval declined to exclude their influence in programming decisions, and we thereupon formally dissociated ourselves." Its regular attendees responded that the forum was not a membership organization, and did not hold any positions itself.

== Orval Etter ==
Orval Etter was an emeritus professor of planning, public policy, and management, a musician, and a pacifist who was a conscientious objector during World War II. Etter died in 2013.

== University of Oregon ==
Other than its meeting place, and having a retired professor as its founder, the group was not affiliated with the university.

The group previously met in a room at the Erb Memorial Union at the University of Oregon (UO). In January 2010, it was moved by UO to the less centrally located Agate Hall at the edge of campus. In March 2010, the group was moved to the Baker Downtown Center, still part of the UO campus but located in downtown Eugene, with UO citing "declining attendance" as the reason for the move.

== Controversies ==
The Pacifica Forum was described by the Southern Poverty Law Center in 2010 as a "formerly left-wing discussion group that has increasingly embraced right-wing extremism." It was listed as a white nationalist hate group by the SPLC in 2009.

Valdas Anelauskas, a Lithuanian immigrant who describes himself as a white separatist, hosted a series of Pacifica Forum talks in 2006, 2008 and 2009. Another speaker, Jimmy Marr, described Martin Luther King Jr. as a "moral leper and communist dupe", and that the American Civil Rights Movement was funded by Jewish communists and the USSR in an attempt to incite violence. Orval Etter and many other attendees strongly rejected this perspective.

The group hosted right-wing intellectual Tomislav Sunic, former Croatian diplomat and author of Homo Americanus: Child Of The Post-Modern Age as a speaker in June 2008. David Irving was also a featured speaker during the same month, speaking on his imprisonment in Austria for Holocaust denial.

In November 2007, Mark Weber of the Institute for Historical Review, appeared at an event organized by the Pacifica Forum. Weber was billed by the group as "America's most prominent revisionist historian". The Weber event was promoted using a flyer that depicts a snake curled in the shape of a Star of David and the headline: "Free Speech versus Zionist power." The meeting was attended by an estimated 60 people.

Orval Etter attended both the Irving and Weber talks, and stated that both men are legitimate historians. According to the SPLC, Etter stated, "I admit that there were some bad things done to Jews during World War II, but I don't believe that everything they claim is truthful." Etter gave a series of talks in 2009 based on the research of John Tanton who criticized the organization for inaccuracy.

The former president of the University of Oregon, David B. Frohnmayer, criticized the Pacifica Forum and stated that its views do not represent those of the university. The PF also drew criticism from the University of Oregon Hillel, a Jewish student group. The forum had access to campus facilities, despite attempts by local anti-hate campaigners to evict it, due to a university policy allowing retired professors to host meetings on campus.

In December 2009, speaker Jimmy Marr gave a presentation entitled: "National Socialist Movement: An Insider's View of America's Radical Right". During the presentation, Marr invited those in attendance to join him in giving the Sieg Heil salute. Marr also showed video footage from a National Socialist Movement demonstration in Phoenix, Arizona. According to a report in the Eugene Weekly, the video shows one of the speakers pointing at a protester and shouting: "YOU are a Jew! A traitor Jew!". To the frustration of some Pacifica Forum members, Marr's Nazi views were embraced by Etter and set the tone for the group's programs, contributing to the exodus of former supporters of the Forum.

On January 8, 2010, Pacifica Forum held a meeting entitled "Everything You Wanted to Know About Pacifica Forum but Were Afraid to Ask". Of the seventy-five people in attendance, about half were protesting the forum. The protest was organized in reaction to Marr's December speech. The forum's supporters responded that the group championed free speech and has nothing to do with Neo-Nazism. One UO student spoke to Valdas Anelauskas and claimed that statements he had made in the past had made her feel unsafe. Following these remarks, ASUO student body president Emma Kallaway asked the Pacifica Forum members to leave the building.

In early 2010, a swastika was found spray-painted into the carpet of the Lesbian Gay Bisexual Trans Queer Alliance in the basement of the Erb Memorial Union. A computer was also vandalized with black paint. It was speculated to be related to a recent discussion by the Pacifica Forum held about the meaning of the swastika.

== Response ==
According to the SPLC, Orval Etter responded to accusations of antisemitism by stating: "If you rub a substantial number of Jews the wrong way, you're anti-Semitic ... In that sense, I have to admit that the Forum and I, in particular, are anti-Semitic." Etter and the forum's regular attendees contested this claim and most of what has been published about them by the SPLC. They argued that the forum is an open discussion group that holds no positions. A report in the Oregon Daily Emerald stated that Etter did not consider himself antisemitic.
