= Keystone United =

American neo-Nazi group

- Formation: 2001
- Type: White power skinhead
- Location: United States
- Formerly called: Keystone State Skinheads

Keystone United, formerly known as the Keystone State Skinheads (KSS), is a neo-Nazi group based in Pennsylvania. The Southern Poverty Law Center stated that the group is one of the largest and most active single-state racist skinhead crews in the United States. According to the KSS website, the group had chapters in Harrisburg, Philadelphia, Pittsburgh, Erie, Scranton, Reading, Carlisle, Allentown and other cities in the state. KSS was featured in the National Geographic Channel documentary American Skinheads. In 2008, KSS changed its name to Keystone United. The number of its members remains unknown. The group's logos are a pit bull or a bulldog bordered by a chain or a Keystone symbol in the colors of the Nazi flag.

== History ==
Keystone State Skinheads was founded in late 2001 by five men from Harrisburg, PA. It originally focused on uniting white power skinheads throughout the regions of Pennsylvania. A second KSS chapter was founded in nearby Lancaster, which had a small group of white power skinheads who were part of a National Alliance youth group. Shortly after the formation of Lancaster's chapter, World Church of the Creator leader Matt Hale had announced plans to visit York, PA to speak at the public library. White supremacists were set upon by hundreds of Anti-Racist Action members and other anti-fascists outside the library. The Anti-Defamation League stated that: "KSS transformed itself from a mainly Harrisburg group to a network of seven regional crews that had members from every major city in the state and associates in New Jersey, Maryland and New York."

The KSS has organized several white power concerts in Pennsylvania, featuring bands such as: Blue Eyed Devils, Max Resist, Youngland, Grom, Cradle Song, Teardown, Those Opposed, Vinland Warriors, Grand Belial's Key and Fear Rains Down.

KSS began to capitalize on its growing prominence by conducting a series of concerts, first in Harrisburg, and then in a series of venues across the state. In late September 2003, Hammerskin Nation allowed KSS to help coordinate Hammerfest, which was held in Pennsylvania. By the beginning of 2004, KSS had become the largest group in the northeastern U.S.

KSS has also organized family-oriented events such as parties and picnics, as well as more political activities, such as distributing pamphlets, attending protests and posting fliers.

=== Violence and arrests ===
- In June 2002, KSS members Robert Gaus, Douglas and Joseph Hoesch were arrested by police outside the Suburban Diner in Feasterville, near Philadelphia, for assaulting a man who asked them to stop throwing food at his table. The victim was struck several times and left on the diner's floor. All three pleaded guilty to a charge of simple assault and were given suspended sentences.
- In September 2002, KSS members Todd Sager, Jason Hayden, and Christopher Keough, beat a former member, Christopher Morosko, who refused to return his KSS "colors". The three pleaded guilty to assault on March 3, 2003, and were all released for time served.
- On March 23, 2003, KSS members Keith Carney, Steve Smith and Steve Monteforte were arrested on ethnic intimidation charges in Scranton, Pennsylvania, for assaulting an African-American man who, according to police, was walking home in the early morning.
- In April 2003, two associates of the Lancaster Keystone State Skinheads were arrested and charged with ethnic intimidation and terroristic threats for making racist and threatening comments to three black patrons in a Lancaster-area bar.
- In January 2006, KSS members Edward Robert Locke and Todd Clair Sager were charged with multiple counts in connection with a violent bar fight in March 2005 in New Stanton. Police claim Locke stabbed two men. Locke was charged with attempted homicide and four counts of aggravated assault while Sager was charged with criminal solicitation to commit homicide and criminal solicitation to commit aggravated assault.
- In January 2007, KSS members Kenneth Hoover, James Robertson, Corey Hulse and Charles Marovskis were arrested for beating two homeless men to death in Tampa, Florida in 1998. Hoover pleaded guilty to second-degree murder and racketeering. Charles Marovskis, of West Pittston, Pennsylvania, but originally from Tampa, Florida, pleaded guilty to two federal charges of second degree murder. Hoover was sentenced to 12.5 years in prison, while Hulse and Marovskis were each sentenced to 20 years in prison. James Robertson, the ringleader, was found guilty of first degree murder and sentenced to life in prison.
- On May 26, 2007, Carney was charged with a series of weapons and assault charges stemming from an incident that reportedly involved him and two other persons beating up an alleged KSS associate.
- On September 7, 2008, Philadelphia police officers arrested KSS member Andrew Boyle at a Philadelphia bar for being in possession of a knife. At the time of his arrest, Boyle was out on bail, awaiting trial on another matter. Boyle, along with co-defendants and fellow KSS members Carney and Doug Caffarella, and Atlantic City Skinhead Vincent DeFelice, were charged with assault and conspiracy in the alleged attack of another skinhead outside a Philadelphia bar in 2007.
