= Työmies (1895) =

Newspaper of the Social Democratic Republic of Finland

Työmies was launched in Helsinki early in 1895

Työmies (The Worker) was the official organ of the Social Democratic Party of Finland. The paper was launched in 1895 and continued until the suppression of the Finnish Socialist Workers' Republic in 1918.

== History ==
Työmies was established by the Helsinki Workers' Association in 1895. The paper's first editor was Adam Hermann Karvonen, an elementary school teacher.

The paper was terminated after the Battle of Helsinki in 1918, when the German troops invaded Helsinki during the Finnish Civil War.

The paper was succeeded as the official organ of the Social Democratic Party of Finland by the Suomen Sosialidemokraatti (Finnish Social-Democrat), later known as Demari (The Socialist) and Uutispäivä Demari (Socialist News). Since 2012 the paper has assumed the name Demokraatti (The Democrat).

== Editors-in-chief ==
- Aatami Hermanni Karvonen, 1895–1896
- Matti Kurikka, 1897–1899
- August Bernhard Mäkelä, 1900–1901
- Edvard Valpas-Hänninen, 1901–1918
