= Darogha Ubbas Alli =

Indian engineer and photographer

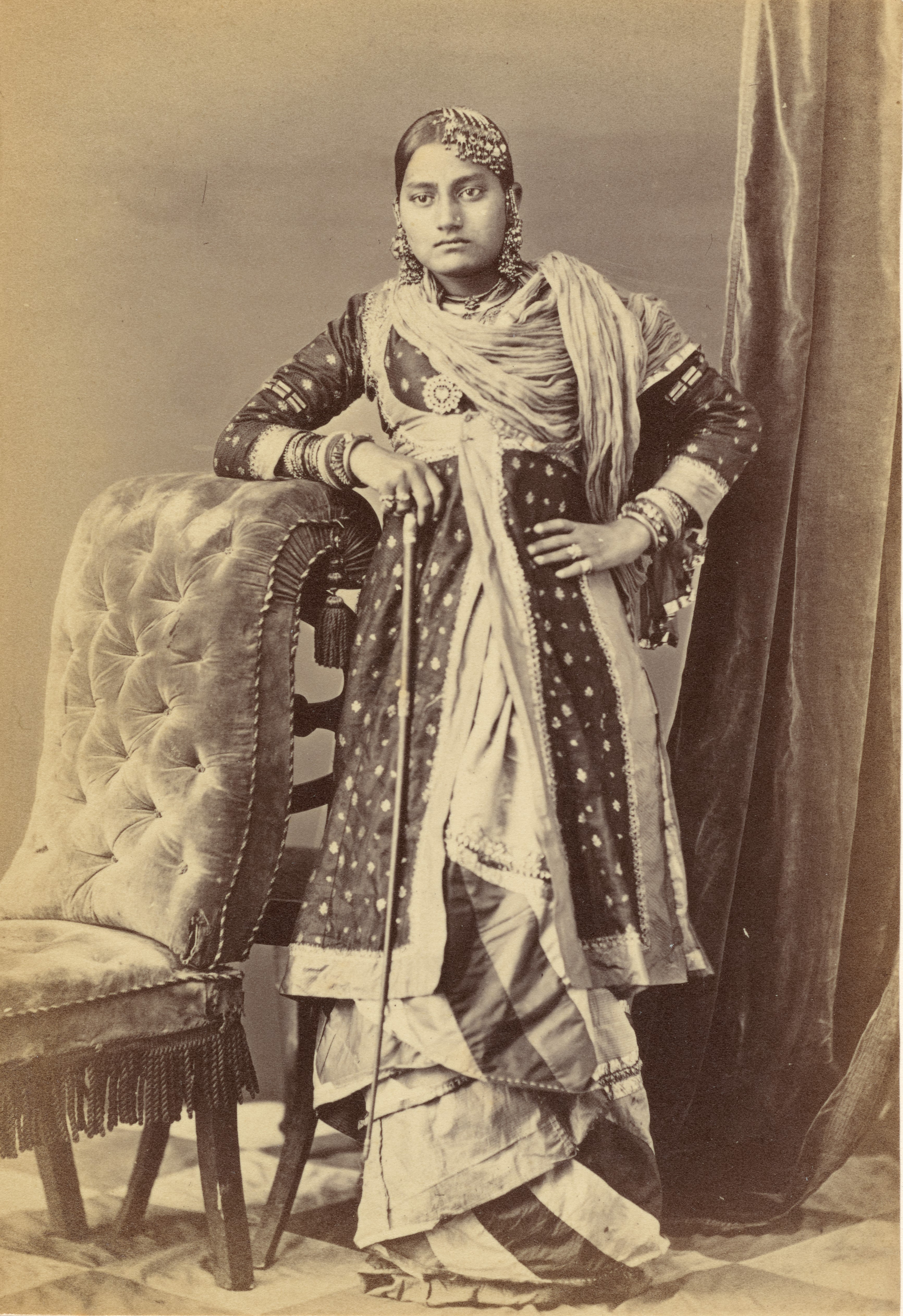
- Born: India
- Citizenship: Indian
- Occupations: Engineer, Photographer
- Years active: 1870s
- Known for: Engineering, Photographing

Darogha Ubbas Alli (a.k.a. Darogha Abbas Ali) was a 19th-century Indian engineer and photographer. Following his retirement as a municipal engineer in Lucknow, Alli began photographing the city and its surroundings in the 1870s. He published fifty of these photographs in an album named The Lucknow Album in 1874. In 1880, he produced another photographic album, titled An Illustrated Historical Album of Rajas and Taaluqdars of Oudh, comprising images of the landed gentry of Oudh.
