= Revolutionary Black Panther Party =

- Leader: Alli Muhammad
- Founded: 1992
- Preceded by: Black Panther Party (contested by former BPP members)
- Ideology: Marxism-Leninism; Black nationalism African-Centered Marxism
- Political position: Far-left
- Colors: Red, black, green

Website
- www.therevolutionaryblackpantherparty.org

The Revolutionary Black Panther Party or RBPP is a Marxist-Leninist black nationalist organization in the United States. RBPP claims to continue the legacy of the Black Panther Party (BPP) of the 1960s.

== History ==
In 1992 the RBPP was created. The RBPP states its aims as "protecting and defending our people against genocide, ethnic cleansing, crimes against humanity, the Black African Holocaust and race war waged against people of African descent."

The RBPP considers itself to be a continuation of the Black Panther Party active in the United States from 1966 and 1982. RBPP leader Alli Muhammad (Chief-General-In-Command), was raised as a member of the BPP. According to Muhammad, "Growing up a Panther cub ... there are things engrained in you, that you can never get out of you, and it matures you, it is difficult to erase this maturity and as a fully grown panther, it lives on in the Revolution, in the Revolutionary Black Panther Party".

=== Marches in St. Louis ===
The RBPP launched what they call the "Armed Black Human Rights Movement" and "Armed Freedom Rides" and did an "Armed Human Rights March" with machetes and rifles through the Central West End (white community) of St. Louis, Missouri, for what according to Alli Muhammad, was "in honor of the humanity" of black victims such as Michael Brown., Alton Sterling, Angelo Brown and Darren Seals.

=== Demonstrations in Milwaukee ===
In 2016, RBPP marched in Milwaukee, Wisconsin, armed with guns, to protest to what they referred to as "genocide" of African Americans at the hands of law enforcement. The RBPP called for the resignation of Milwaukee Mayor Tom Barrett and Police Chief Ed Flynn.

== See also ==
- Black Panther Party
- Huey P. Newton Gun Club
