= Sure Foundation Baptist Church =

American fundamentalist Baptist church

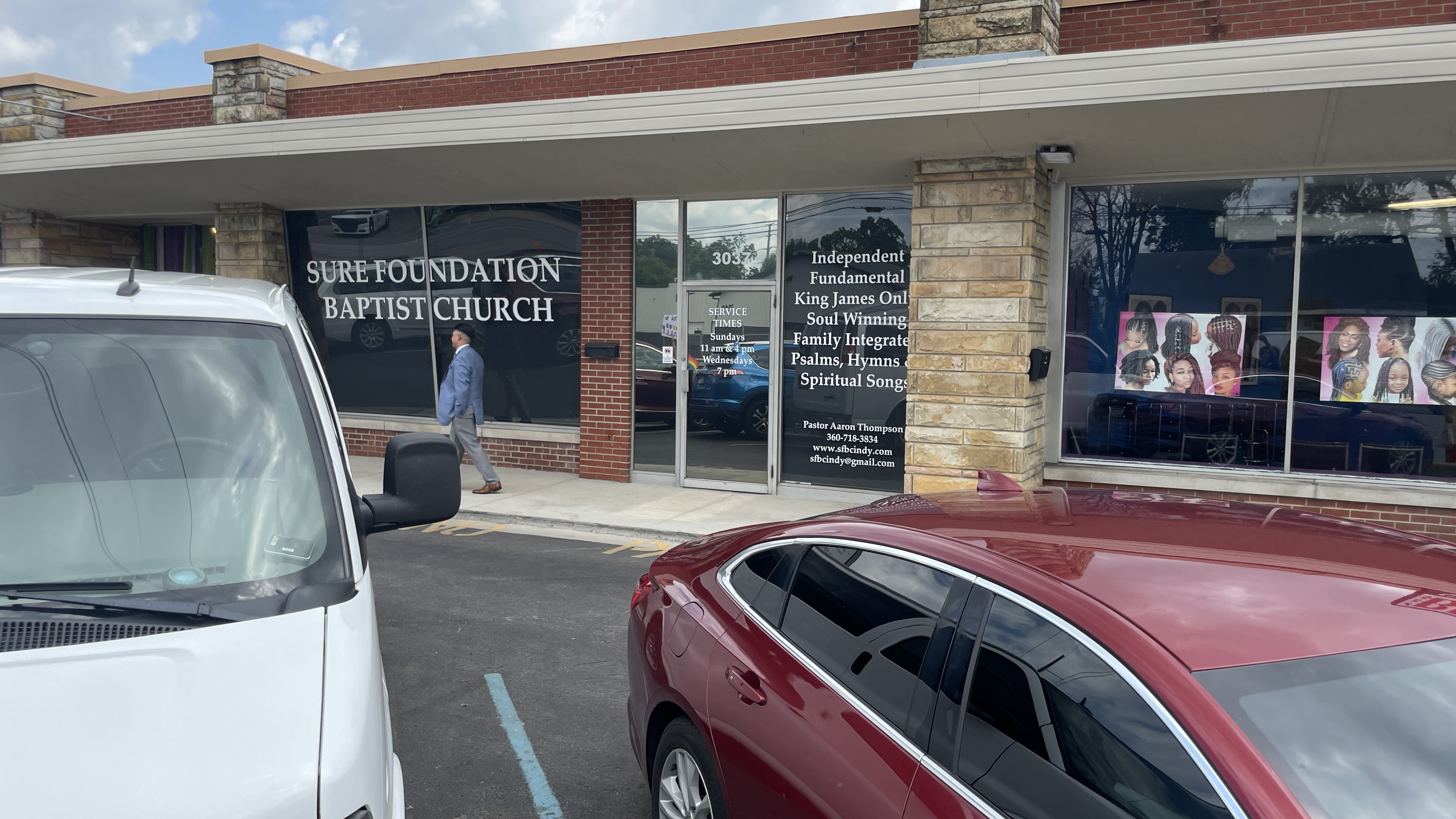
Exterior of the Sure Foundation Baptist Church's Indianapolis branch, located on Lafayette Road in Indianapolis. July, 2025.

Sure Foundation Baptist Church is an independent American Christian fundamentalist Baptist church with branches in Indianapolis and the state of Washington. It is led by pastor Aaron Thompson. The church is best known for its extreme anti-LGBTQ stance, advocating the imposition of the death penalty for homosexuals. It is classified as a hate group by the SPLC and the Anti-Defamation League. Its pastors spoke out in praise of the mass shootings of people from the LGBTQ community at Club Q in Colorado Springs, Colorado.

== History ==
The church was founded in 2018.

== Controversy ==
=== Promoting the suicide of LGBTQ+ people ===
At the church's Indianapolis branch during a Men's Preaching Night on June 29, 2025, Stephen Falco made numerous comments regarding the LGBTQ+ community, including that they should "blow [themselves] in the head, in the back of the head." While Falco's sermon was reportedly removed from YouTube for violating its Terms of Service, at the time of publication, it remains available on Facebook.

On July 3, local leader Justin Zhong defended Falco's sermon on the Church's Facebook page, stating he "will not apologize for preaching the Word of God" and "stating facts," stating "the LGBTHIV crowd is full of domestic terrorists."

=== Promoting the death penalty for LGBTQ+ people ===
When WISH-TV reached out to the Indianapolis branch of the church regarding Falco's remarks, the church responded that Falco was "...only calling for the death penalty and suicide for the actual sodomites (homosexuals). The Bible teaches that those people are worthy of death. They are supposed to be executed by the government. We are not to take the law into our own hands."

=== Protests against the Indianapolis branch of the church ===
Zhong reportedly told the Indianapolis Star that he was "not surprised" at the first protest on July 13.

Charlize Jamieson, a transgender woman from Muncie, drove to the Indianapolis branch to attend service at the church. Before she could park her car, WISH-TV reports, the church took photos of her and her license plate. She told WISH that "she was not there for the protests, but 'would have joined (the protests)' should she be turned away from worship." Speaking to a local videographer, Jaimeson added the church said that "the police were on the way, and [she] was trespassing, and [she] was being trespassed off, apparently for having [her] car there."

== See also ==
• Westboro Baptist Church, another American Baptist group with similar fundamentalist theology
