= Aryan Nations Motorcycle Riders Division =

Motorcycle club that was part of a law enforcement operation

The 1st SS Kavallerie Brigade Motorcycle Division, also known as the Aryan Nations Motorcycle Riders Division, was the name of a white supremacist outlaw motorcycle club set up by law enforcement units as an undercover operation to investigate crime and domestic terrorism within the neo-Nazi movement.

== Background ==
Named after the SS Cavalry Brigade - a horse-mounted unit of the German Waffen-SS during World War II - the 1st SS Kavallerie Brigade Motorcycle Division was established in 2007 in Florida with the intent of recruiting neo-Nazi bikers for Aryan Nations, a white supremacist terrorist organization. By November 2008, the group claimed three units in Florida and one unit in Tennessee.

Brian "Doizer" Klose, who had originally worked as an enforcer for the nearby chapter of the Outlaws Motorcycle Club, became the leader of the 1st SS Kavallerie Brigade in 2008. Unbeknownst to Klose, the Kavallerie Brigade clubhouse in St. Cloud was packed with surveillance cameras and microphones monitored by the FBI. While remaining unaware of being filmed and recorded, Klose warned members to be wary of the post-9/11 Patriot Act, which gave police new surveillance powers, and to never admit they belonged to the Kavallerie Brigade. In 2009, undercover agents traveled with Klose to Chicago to meet with national leaders of the Outlaws about opening Kavallerie Brigade chapters in the Midwest.

== Law enforcement operations ==
The original investigation began in 2007 when federal agent Robert Killian of the Orange County Sheriff's Office, using a false name, began making trading emails with August Kreis III, a leader of Aryan Nations, who wanted to form a "Nazi motorcycle club" to serve as the militant arm for white supremacists across the country. Going further undercover within the scene, Killian presented himself as a neo-Nazi biker named Robert “Doc” Fenaughty and eventually became appointed as the Florida Affiliate Coordinator for Aryan Nations. As Aryan Nations's top Florida administrator, his job was recruiting members for what would become the 1st SS Kavallerie Brigade Motorcycle Division.

Early members of the gang included two undercover FBI agents, who used their knowledge of explosives to gain the trust of white supremacists. Records show that the FBI also paid an Orlando man named David Gletty, a former drug dealer who had sold cocaine in the 1st SS Kavallerie Brigade's clubhouse, to infiltrate the group as a confidential informant. Emailing agents late at night, Gletty reported on whom he met, drugs sold, guns they carried and violent acts planned.

The law enforcement sting tied into the investigation of another neo-Nazi hate group in St. Cloud, the American Front, which had been under suspicion of planning violence and engaging in paramilitary training on a heavily fortified compound in neighboring Osceola County.

On April 28, 2009, Robert Killian detonated a remote-control bomb in order to impress Klose. The blast excited Klose so much that he fired a pistol and told Killian to use the explosive on the Warlocks MC’s clubhouse.

== Outcome ==
The investigation lasted for five years and led to the arrests of 20 people, for offenses that ranged from dealing drugs to possessing illegal weapons and plotting murders. Some of the skinhead bikers who were exposed in the sting operation allegedly had the intention of engaging in domestic terrorism.

Brian Klose was arrested on charges of trafficking in hydrocodone and oxycontin, threatening to throw a destructive device, manufacturing and selling drugs and purchasing cocaine. Members Ronald Cusack, Carlos Eugene Dubose, and Harold Johnson Kinlaw were also some of the known members who were arrested on similar charges. Brian Klose's wife, Leah Klose, was arrested drug charges along with an additional club associate, Deborah Plowman.
