= Alli Muhammad =

African-American doctor, psychologist, political activist (born 1968)

- Born: Alli Ogun Muhammad; July 26, 1968 (age 58); Miami, Florida, USA
- Education: University of Tripoli (Doctorate Degree) (MD); University of KwaZulu-Natal (Doctorate Degree) (MD)
- Occupations: Medical doctor, psychologist
- Years active: Present
- Organization(s): Black Panthers, Revolutionary Black Panther Party
- Political party: The Revolutionary Black Panther Party
- Spouse(s): Auset Muhammad (1996); Ma’at Muhammad (1998-2019)
- Children: 22

Alli Muhammad is an African-American doctor, psychologist, political activist and revolutionary who founded the Revolutionary Black Panther Party, which claims continuity from the Black Panther Party of 1966, the RBPP was officially named in 1992.

== Background ==
Muhammad was born in Gondar, Ethiopia. At that time, his father who is of Afro-Caribbean, African-American descent was a medical doctor working in Ethiopia (and also a member of the US Marines). His mother was also a medical doctor of Ethiopian descent. The couple worked in the US, the Caribbean and Africa. They joined the Black Panther Party (BPP) in 1967. The couple also attended Howard University in Washington, DC together. The couple raised their son, Dr. Muhammad on the principles of the BPP, and assured his direct participation into the BPP's programs in the community.

Muhammad was raised on the principles of Marxist-Leninism, socialism, Pan-Africanism and black nationalism. Both of his parents were staunch Marxists, but were also supporters of black nationalism, Pan-Africanism and socialism.

== Education ==
Muhammad earned his medical degree in internal medicine from the University of Tripoli in Libya, and continued his medical education at the University of Natal currently The University of KwaZulu-Natal, earning a medical degree in neurology.

Muhammad holds two medical degrees, as well two PhD degrees psychology and master's degree in military science.

== Leadership ==
Muhammad is the leader of the Revolutionary Black Panther Party, which he states the entire objective, mission is to “feed, clothe, shelter, train & defend black people” and to stand up for “human rights of black people”.

The Revolutionary Black Panther Party has over 34 chapter in the United States and several other chapters around the world. Muhammad operates several schools, medical facilities and community programs throughout the US and globally. Muhammad also opened a chapter in the Bahamas in January 2022. As stated, "An organization claiming continuity of the Black Panthers party of the 1960s is making its presence felt in the Bahamas by helping families in need. The organization claims itself to be a continuation of the original Black Panther Party of the 1960s with a mission to “feed, clothe, shelter, train and defend the people”, according to Muhammad... Muhammad, who claims he has roots in The Bahamas says they are willing to work with the [Bahamian] government in any future endeavor...".

== Activism ==
Muhammad as an activist has worked for the human rights of black people, and through the RBPP he launched the Armed Black Human Rights Movement, Armed Freedom Rides and also has led several Armed Human Rights Marches, and "Human Rights Tribunals" throughout the United States, Muhammad with his RBPP Milwaukee Wisconsin Chapter, marched through, the Sherman Park neighborhood in the snow, in face blistering temperatures, in front of the Milwaukee Police precinct, demanding justice for Syville Smith and other "African-American" men, who died in police involved shootings in Wisconsin.

Muhammad also believed that he and the RBPP were being harassed and targeted by law enforcement, with was described as COINTELPRO, and threatened a $400 million lawsuit against law enforcement as a result of it.

Muhammad and the Revolutionary Black Panther Party also marched armed through the Central West End (affluent community) of St. Louis Missouri, with rifles, shotguns and machetes, which in his words were to honor the life and humanity of black victims of police brutality, such as Michael Brown Jr., Alton Sterling, Angelo Brown (RBPP General Houdari Juelani) and Ferguson Activist Darren Seals, Muhammad believed that Angelo Brown's death was politically motivated, because his membership with the Revolutionary Black Panther Party, of which Brown was a national leader, Brown a US military veteran who died as a result of gunshot wounds, in an apparent shootout with police, June 23, 2016.

Muhammad and the group have also marched through several other cities throughout the country armed, including Wilmington, North Carolina, where Muhammad stated that, “We have Walter Scott.... There are other people who we understand to be victims of genocide. That's why we are in the state, but particularly dealing with Wilmington, Brandon Smith is one of those particular ones.” Brandon Smith was fatally shot, October 13, 2013, by New Hanover County Sheriff's Office deputies and a federal Alcohol, Tobacco, Firearms and Explosives agent, in Wilmington, North Carolina. Muhammad, supports and family claimed that the shooting was wrong.

Muhammad and the group have also march armed, and held a "Human Rights Tribunal" through other cities, including Valdosta, Georgia, to reopen the Kendrick Johnson case, and for other issues in the city and state.
