= Jeff Sheehy =

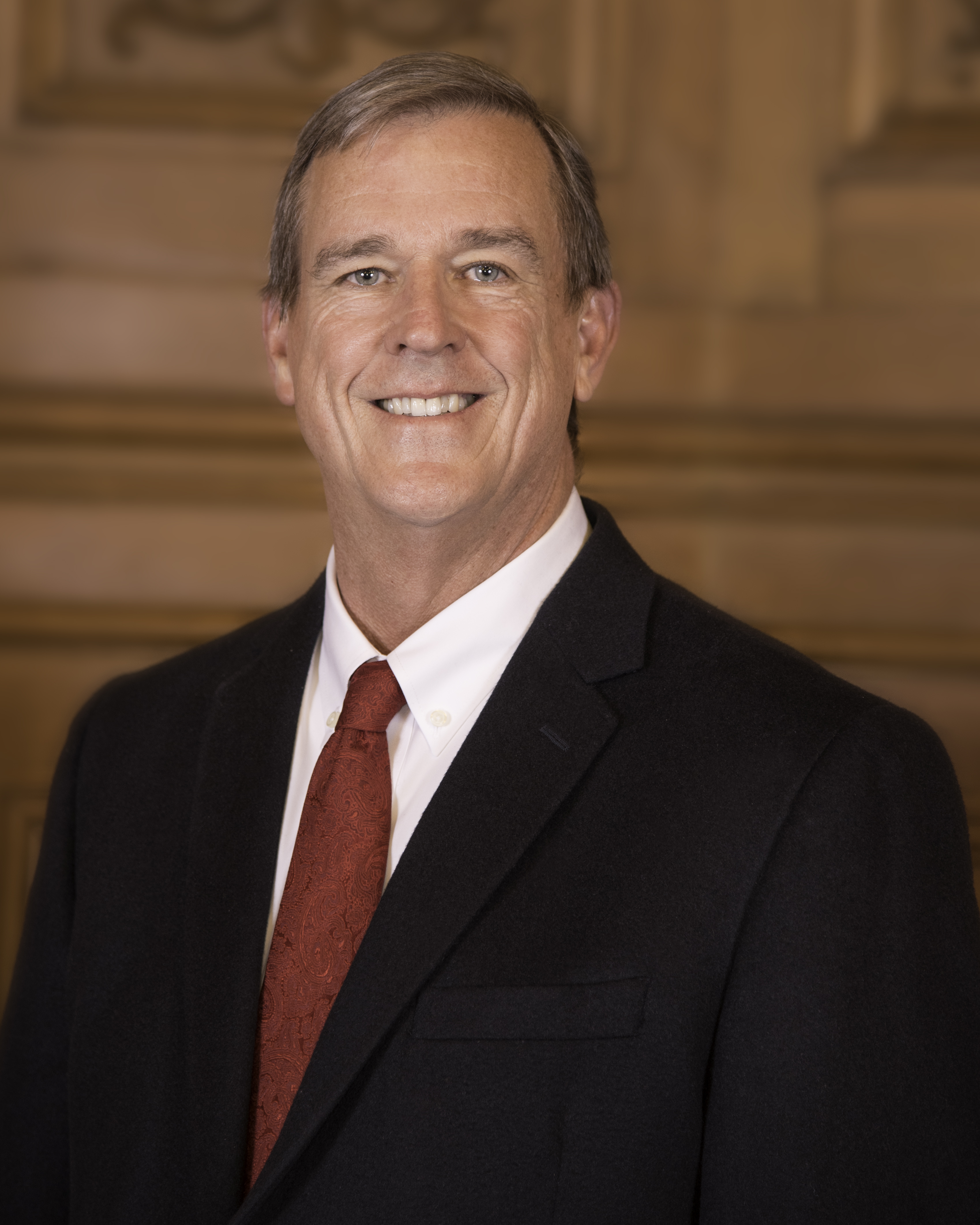
- Official portrait, 2017

Member of the San Francisco Board of Supervisors from District 8
- In office January 8, 2017 – July 11, 2018
- Preceded by: Scott Wiener
- Succeeded by: Rafael Mandelman

Personal details
- Born: 1957 or 1958 (age 68–69)
- Party: Democratic
- Spouse: Bill Berry
- Children: Michelle
- Education: University of Texas, Austin
- Profession: Politician
- Website: Board of Supervisors; District 8 website

Jeff Sheehy is a former member of the San Francisco Board of Supervisors representing Supervisorial District 8. He was appointed to the Board in January 2017 by then-mayor Ed Lee to succeed Supervisor Scott Wiener, who resigned his seat to take office as a member of the California State Senate. Prior to his appointment, Sheehy served as a communications director for UCSF AIDS Research Institute.

== Background ==
Sheehy grew up in Waco, Texas, where his grandfather John and father James were both former mayors of the city.

== Career ==
Sheehy graduated from the University of Texas at Austin in 1985. He was a member of San Francisco ACT-UP, and worked on such issues as organ transplants for people with HIV and legislation to facilitate safe conception for HIV-positive men through advanced assisted reproduction techniques with their HIV-negative partners.

In 1996, Sheehy was one of three people who developed the city's Equal Benefits Ordinance and successfully advocated for its adoption. The ordinance requires any company receiving a city contract to provide their employees' same-sex domestic partners the same benefits that spouses receive.

Sheehy was appointed as a victim's advocate for the SF district attorney's office in 1998, serving until 2000.

He served as Mayor Gavin Newsom's HIV/AIDS advisor. He was appointed as a member of the governing board of the California Institute for Regenerative Medicine (CIRM) in 2005. In 2020, he authored an op-ed opposing CA Proposition 14, which would have provided new funding for CIRM, asserting that the measure was fatally flawed and would impose an unnecessary burden on the state's budget.

Sheehy is the communications director of the UCSF AIDS Research Institute. He was also a founding member of the Steering Committee of San Francisco’s Getting to Zero Consortium. The consortium's goals are to make San Francisco the first city to achieve the three UNAIDS goals: zero new infections, zero HIV deaths and zero HIV stigma.

Sheehy has received several awards for his activist work: the Human Rights Campaign’s Leadership Award, the Caped Crusader Award from Equality California, the Tomas Fabregas AIDS Hero Award, the UCSF Chancellor's Award for Public Service, and has been named to OUT magazine's "Out 100" and POZ magazine's "POZ 100". His name is fifth on the cover.

Following Scott Wiener's departure from the San Francisco Board of Supervisors due to his election to the California State Senate in 2016, Sheehy was appointed to fill out the remainder of his term by San Francisco Mayor Ed Lee. Sheehy was the only HIV-positive member of the Board.

== Sources ==
- Sheehy, Jeff (September 15, 2020). "Commentary: Why Prop. 14 is unaffordable, unnecessary, fatally flawed and unsupportable". San Diego Union-Tribune.
- Green, Emily (January 5, 2017). "AIDS activist Sheehy to succeed Wiener as SF supervisor". San Francisco Chronicle.
- "Jeff Sheehy". California Institute for Regenerative Medicine. 2015. Archived from the original on January 7, 2017.
- "Politics a family pursuit for D8 Supe Sheehy". Bay Area Reporter. January 12, 2017.
