= David Lane (activist) =

American political activist (born 1955)

- Born: c. 1955 (age 70–71); California
- Occupation: Political activist
- Known for: Christian right advocacy

David Lane (born c. 1955) is an American political activist who works to increase the political strength of religious groups on the Christian right, to promote social conservative values in the United States.

Funded largely by the American Family Association (AFA), Lane has organized political briefings with appearances by fundamentalist pastors such as David Barton and politicians such as Mike Huckabee, Newt Gingrich, Michele Bachmann and Haley Barbour. In his behind-the-scenes work for right-wing politics, Lane has been described by The New York Times as "something of a stealth weapon for the right".

== Activism ==
=== Pastor meetings ===
In the 1990s Lane organized his first pastor meetings in California, where he lives, and in Texas. In the 2000s, the effort was greatly expanded, with funding from the AFA. Each meeting, which is nearly free to participants, costs the AFA "many tens of thousands of dollars". AFA spokesman Bryan Fischer said that, as co-sponsor of the pastor meetings, the AFA maintained an expanding email list of some 40,000–60,000 pastors across the U.S.

From 2005, Lane served as the executive director of The Texas Restoration Project, a program founded by Barton and the AFA to help conservative religious leaders in Texas become more politically aware and active. The Texas Restoration Project spent $1.26 million on six pastor briefing meetings in 2005 in support of Governor Rick Perry, and "Judeo-Christian values". A nonprofit group, the Niemoller Foundation, using money from wealthy Texans such as businessman James R. Leininger, and money from the AFA, paid for Lane's salary and for the pastor briefings through 2007. Liberal watchdog Texas Freedom Network (TFN) called for an investigation of the Niemoller Foundation's tax-free nonprofit status in early 2008, but in May 2009 the Internal Revenue Service sent a letter to the Niemoller Foundation ruling that they did not violate their tax-exempt status, and that ministers and pastors may advocate political action on behalf of moral values in their congregations without risk to their tax-exempt status, as long as they do not endorse a specific candidate or spend substantial funds on political issues. Dan Quinn of the TFN said, "this ruling is disappointing because it will embolden wealthy special interests who want to funnel money into nonprofits as a backdoor way to drag churches into partisan campaigns." Lane said in response, "What we're doing is the mobilization of pastors and pews to restore America to her Judeo-Christian heritage. That's our goal."

In 2010 Lane coordinated politically oriented pastor meetings in Nevada, New Hampshire, Ohio, South Carolina, Tennessee and Iowa; several of these considered "important battlegrounds in presidential politics." Mark DeMoss, a former aide to Reverend Jerry Falwell, said that such mobilizing of pastors for political action is important work, with "people out there like David Lane, whose names we may not know, who are contributing to a large fabric of involvement." In March 2011, Lane said of a two-day, 400-person meeting of Iowa pastors and spouses, "What we're doing with the pastor meetings is spiritual, but the end result is political. ... From my perspective, our country is going to hell because pastors won't lead from the pulpits." Huckabee addressed the pastors in praise of Lane, saying he was "bringing pastors together so they go back to their pulpits and light them on fire with enthusiasm, to make America once again the greatest country on earth under God."

=== Opposition to same-sex marriage ===
In the late 1990s, Lane worked against same-sex marriage in California, helping place California Proposition 22 on the ballot in 2000. In this effort, Lane worked with the California Restoration Project, founded by Edward Atsinger of Salem Communications, one of the largest Christian broadcast companies. The proposition passed, restricting California marriages to being only between one man and one woman. It was soon challenged, and overturned in 2008 by the California Supreme Court.

Lane worked with Houston-based Lutheran pastor Laurence White to pass opposite-sex-only marriage amendments to the state constitutions of Ohio (in 2004), Texas (in 2005), and Florida (in 2006). The Texas campaign for Proposition 2 passed overwhelmingly. The Florida measure is known as Amendment 2, and Ohio's is referred to as State Issue 1.

==== Iowa Supreme Court justices ====
In November 2010, voters in Iowa removed three Iowa Supreme Court justices: David Baker, Michael Streit, and Chief Justice Marsha Ternus. The justices lost their seats primarily because of what they believed was their constitutional stance in a 2009 decision allowing same-sex couples to marry. The New York Times reported that Lane was the "unheralded mastermind" of the campaign against the justices, directing hundreds of thousands of dollars from Gingrich and from the AFA. A pastor from Iowa said, "God used David Lane and his sphere of influence to bring together all the elements" of a broad strategy to unseat the justices.
