= Voiceless (disambiguation) =

Voiceless may refer to:

- Voicelessness, linguistic sounds produced without vibrating the larynx
- Muteness, the property of being unable to produce a voice
- Aphasia, the condition of being unable to speak
- A lack of power (social and political)
- Voiceless (animal rights group), the animal protection institute based in Sydney, Australia
- Voiceless (2015 film), an American film
- Voiceless (2020 film), a Nigerian thriller film

== See also ==
- Speechless (disambiguation)
