= Lisa Miller =

Lisa Miller may refer to:

== Fictional characters ==
- Lisa Miller (24), a character on the TV series 24
- Lisa Miller (As the World Turns), a character on the TV series As the World Turns
- Lisa Miller (Scott Pilgrim), a character in Scott Pilgrim
- Lisa Miller (NewsRadio), a character on the TV series NewsRadio

== Others ==
- Lisa Miller (singer-songwriter), Australian singer/songwriter
- Lisa Miller (psychologist), clinical psychologist at Columbia University, Teachers College and author of The Spiritual Child
- Lisa Miller (journalist) (born 1963), author of Heaven: Our Enduring Fascination with the Afterlife
- One of the litigants in Miller v. Jenkins

== See also ==
- Lisa Millar, an Australian journalist
- Luisa Miller, an opera by Giuseppe Verdi
