= List of West Alabama Tigers in the NFL draft =

This is a list of West Alabama Tigers football players in the NFL draft.

== Key ==
B	Back	K	Kicker	NT	Nose tackle
C	Center	LB	Linebacker	FB	Fullback
DB	Defensive back	P	Punter	HB	Halfback
DE	Defensive end	QB	Quarterback	WR	Wide receiver
DT	Defensive tackle	RB	Running back	G	Guard
E	End	T	Offensive tackle	TE	Tight end

= Pro Bowler
= Hall of Famer

== Selections ==
Year	Round	Pick	Player	Team	Position
1951	27	327	Jack Jones	Cleveland Browns	LB
1966	18	267	Bill Johnson	Detroit Lions	WR
1974	4	97	Ken Hutcherson	Dallas Cowboys	LB
1974	8	192	Larry Lightfoot	New York Jets	RB
2016	5	165	Tyreek Hill	Kansas City Chiefs	WR
