= List of bills related to international child abduction by US Congress =

== 111th Congress - 2009-2010 ==
=== House ===
- H.RES.125 Calling on Brazil in accordance with its obligations under the 1980 Hague Convention on the Civil Aspects of International Child Abduction to obtain, as a matter of extreme urgency, the return of Sean Goldman to his father David Goldman in the United States; urging the governments of all countries that are partners with the United States to the Hague Convention to fulfill their obligations to return abducted children to the United States; and recommending that all other nations, including Japan, that have unresolved international child abduction cases join the Hague Convention and establish procedures to promptly and equitably address the tragedy of international child abductions.

Sponsor: Rep Smith, Christopher H. [NJ-4] (introduced 2/4/2009) Cosponsors (57) Committees: House Foreign Affairs Latest Major Action: 3/11/2009 Passed/agreed to in House. Status: On motion to suspend the rules and agree to the resolution, as amended Agreed to by the Yeas and Nays: (2/3 required): 418 - 0 (Roll no. 120).

- H.RES.1326 : Calling on the Government of Japan to address the urgent problem of abduction to and retention of United States citizen children in Japan, to work closely with the Government of the United States to return these children to their custodial parent or to the original jurisdiction for a custody determination in the United States, to provide left-behind parents immediate access to their children, and to adopt without delay the 1980 Hague Convention on the Civil Aspects of International Child Abduction.

Sponsor: Rep Moran, James P. [VA-8] (introduced 5/5/2010) Cosponsors (34) Committees: House Foreign Affairs Latest Major Action: 9/29/2010 Passed/agreed to in House. Status: On motion to suspend the rules and agree to the resolution, as amended Agreed to by the Yeas and Nays: (2/3 required): 416 - 1 (Roll no. 553).

- H.R.2702 : Suspend Brazil GSP Act

Sponsor: Rep Smith, Christopher H. [NJ-4] (introduced 6/4/2009) Cosponsors (6) Committees: House Ways and Means Latest Major Action: 6/4/2009 Referred to House committee. Status: Referred to the House Committee on Ways and Means.

- H.R.3240 : International Child Abduction Prevention Act of 2009

Sponsor: Rep Smith, Christopher H. [NJ-4] (introduced 7/16/2009) Cosponsors (47) Committees: House Foreign Affairs; House Ways and Means; House Financial Services; House Judiciary; House Oversight and Government Reform Latest Major Action: 9/14/2009 Referred to House subcommittee. Status: Referred to the Subcommittee on Immigration, Citizenship, Refugees, Border Security, and International Law.

- H.R.3487 : International Parental Child Abduction Deterrence Act

Rep Holt, Rush D. [NJ-12] (introduced 7/31/2009) Cosponsors (15) Committees: House Judiciary Latest Major Action: 9/14/2009 Referred to House subcommittee. Status: Referred to the Subcommittee on Immigration, Citizenship, Refugees, Border Security, and International Law.

- H.AMDT.191 to H.R.2410 An amendment numbered 11 printed in part C of House Report 111-134 to direct the Secretary of State to report within 60 days of enactment on changes in treaty and U.S. laws that could help improve compliance with the Hague Convention on the Civil Aspects of International Child Abduction.

Sponsor: Rep Holt, Rush D. [NJ-12] (introduced 6/10/2009) Cosponsors (None) Latest Major Action: 6/10/2009 House amendment agreed to. Status: On agreeing to the Holt amendment (A011) Agreed to by voice vote.

=== Senate ===
- S.RES.37 : A resolution calling on Brazil to comply with the requirements of the Convention on the Civil Aspects of International Child Abduction and to assist in the safe return of Sean Goldman to his father, David Goldman.

Sponsor: Sen Lautenberg, Frank R. [NJ] (introduced 2/11/2009) Cosponsors (4) Committees: Senate Foreign Relations Latest Major Action: 3/24/2009 Passed/agreed to in Senate. Status: Resolution agreed to in Senate with an amendment and an amendment to the Title and an amended preamble by Unanimous Consent.

== 110th Congress - 2007-2008 ==
=== House ===
- H.R.2518 : Bring Our Children Home Act

Sponsor: Rep Lampson, Nick [TX-22] (introduced 5/24/2007) Cosponsors (34) Committees: House Judiciary; House Foreign Affairs; House Education and Labor; House Transportation and Infrastructure Latest Major Action: 7/24/2007 Referred to House subcommittee. Status: Referred to the Subcommittee on Healthy Families and Communities.

- H.R.6095 : International and Parental Child Abduction Remedies Assistance Act

Sponsor: Rep Lampson, Nick [TX-22] (introduced 5/20/2008) Cosponsors (7) Committees: House Judiciary Latest Major Action: 7/28/2008 Referred to House subcommittee. Status: Referred to the Subcommittee on Courts, the Internet, and Intellectual Property.

- H.R.6096 : International Child Abduction Progress Reports Act

Sponsor: Rep Lampson, Nick [TX-22] (introduced 5/20/2008) Cosponsors (7) Committees: House Foreign Affairs; House Judiciary Latest Major Action: 7/28/2008 Referred to House subcommittee. Status: Referred to the Subcommittee on Crime, Terrorism, and Homeland Security.

== 108th Congress - 2003-2004 ==
=== House ===
- H.RES.821 : Condemning the abduction of Dylan Benwell from the United States and calling for his return.

Sponsor: Rep Crane, Philip M. [IL-8] (introduced 10/5/2004) Cosponsors (22) Committees: House International Relations Latest Major Action: 10/7/2004 Passed/agreed to in House. Status: On motion to suspend the rules and agree to the resolution Agreed to by voice vote.

- H.R.3941 : Bring Our Children Home Act

Sponsor: Rep Lampson, Nick [TX-9] (introduced 3/11/2004) Cosponsors (106) Committees: House Judiciary; House International Relations; House Ways and Means Latest Major Action: 4/2/2004 Referred to House subcommittee. Status: Referred to the Subcommittee on Courts, the Internet, and Intellectual Property.

- H.R.4347 : International Assistance to Missing and Exploited Children Act of 2004

Sponsor: Rep Hyde, Henry J. [IL-6] (introduced 5/12/2004) Cosponsors (32) Committees: House Judiciary; House International Relations; House Ways and Means Latest Major Action: 5/20/2004 Referred to House subcommittee. Status: Referred to the Subcommittee on Crime, Terrorism, and Homeland Security.

=== Senate ===
- S.2202 : Bring Our Children Home Act

Sponsor: Sen Feinstein, Dianne [CA] (introduced 3/11/2004) Cosponsors (3) Committees: Senate Judiciary Latest Major Action: 3/11/2004 Referred to Senate committee. Status: Read twice and referred to the Committee on the Judiciary.

- S.2883 : Prevention of Child Abduction Partnership Act

Sponsor: Sen Hatch, Orrin G. [UT] (introduced 10/1/2004) Cosponsors (1) Latest Major Action: Became Public Law No: 108-370 [GPO: Text, PDF]

== 107th Congress - 2001-2002 ==
=== House ===
- H.CON.RES.69 : Expressing the sense of the Congress on the Hague Convention on the Civil Aspects of International Child Abduction and urging all Contracting States to the Convention to recommend the production of practice guides.

Sponsor: Rep Lampson, Nick [TX-9] (introduced 3/20/2001) Cosponsors (52) Committees: House International Relations Latest Major Action: 3/23/2001 Passed/agreed to in Senate. Status: Resolution agreed to in Senate without amendment and with a preamble by Unanimous Consent.

- H.CON.RES.237 : Expressing the sense of the Congress urging the Republic of Italy to safely and immediately return Ludwig Maximilian Koons to the custody of his father in New York.

Sponsor: Rep Lampson, Nick [TX-9] (introduced 9/24/2001) Cosponsors (None) Committees: House International Relations Latest Major Action: 9/24/2001 Referred to House committee. Status: Referred to the House Committee on International Relations.

- H.CON.RES.516 : Expressing the sense of Congress that United States diplomatic and consular missions should provide the full and complete protection of the United States to certain citizens of the United States living abroad.

Sponsor: Burton, Dan [IN-6] (introduced 11/13/2002) Cosponsors (2) Committees: House International Relations Latest Major Action: 11/13/2002 Referred to House committee. Status: Referred to the House Committee on International Relations.

- H.R.2688 : Bring Our Children Home Act

Sponsor: Rep Lampson, Nick [TX-9] (introduced 7/31/2001) Cosponsors (105) Committees: House Judiciary; House International Relations Latest Major Action: 9/10/2001 Referred to House subcommittee. Status: Referred to the Subcommittee on Courts, the Internet, and Intellectual Property.

- H.R.5397 : Protecting Our Children From Violence Act of 2002

Sponsor: Rep Foley, Mark [FL-16](introduced 9/18/2002) Cosponsors (10) Committees: House Judiciary; House Transportation and Infrastructure; House Education and the Workforce Latest Major Action: 11/25/2002 Referred to House subcommittee. Status: Referred to the Subcommittee on Select Education.

- H.R.5715 : To amend the Immigration and Nationality Act to render inadmissible to the United States the extended family of international child abductors, and for other purposes.

Sponsor: Rep Burton, Dan [IN-6] (introduced 11/13/2002) Cosponsors (2) Committees: House Judiciary Latest Major Action: 11/13/2002 Referred to House committee. Status: Referred to the House Committee on the Judiciary.

=== Senate ===
- S.CON.RES.157 : A concurrent resolution expressing the sense of Congress that United States Diplomatic missions should provide the full and complete protection of the United States to certain citizens of the United States living abroad.

Sponsor: Sen Lincoln, Blanche L. [AR] (introduced 11/13/2002) Cosponsors (1) Committees: Senate Foreign Relations Latest Major Action: 11/13/2002 Referred to Senate committee. Status: Referred to the Committee on Foreign Relations.

- S.3159 : A bill to amend the Immigration and Nationality Act to render inadmissible to the United States the extended family of international child abductors, and for other purposes.

Sponsor: Sen Lincoln, Blanche L. [AR] (introduced 11/14/2002) Cosponsors (None) Committees: Senate Judiciary Latest Major Action: 11/14/2002 Referred to Senate committee. Status: Read twice and referred to the Committee on the Judiciary.

== 106th Congress - 1999-2000 ==
=== House ===
- H.CON.RES.293 : Urging compliance with the Hague Convention on the Civil Aspects of International Child Abduction.

Sponsor: Rep Chabot, Steve [OH-1] (introduced 3/23/2000) Cosponsors (132) Committees: House International Relations Latest Major Action: 6/23/2000 Passed/agreed to in Senate. Status: Resolution agreed to in Senate without amendment and with a preamble by Unanimous Consent.

- H.R.5456 : Bring Our Children Home Act

Sponsor: Rep Lampson, Nick [TX-9] (introduced 10/12/2000) Cosponsors (103) Committees: House Judiciary; House International Relations Latest Major Action: 10/12/2000 Referred to House committee. Status: Referred to the Committee on the Judiciary, and in addition to the Committee on International Relations, for a period to be subsequently determined by the Speaker, in each case for consideration of such provisions as fall within the jurisdiction of the committee concerned.

- H.RES.215 : Expressing the sense of the House of Representatives with regard to the return of Saif Ahmed.

Sponsor: Rep Lampson, Nick [TX-9] (introduced 6/16/1999) Cosponsors (9) Committees: House International Relations Latest Major Action: 6/16/1999 Referred to House committee. Status: Referred to the House Committee on International Relations.

- H.R.357 : Violence Against Women Act of 1999

Sponsor: Rep Conyers, John, Jr. [MI-14] (introduced 1/19/1999) Cosponsors (180) Committees: House Judiciary; House Education and the Workforce; House Ways and Means; House Commerce; House Banking and Financial Services; House Armed Services; House Government Reform Latest Major Action: 2/25/1999 Referred to House subcommittee. Status: Referred to the Subcommittee on Crime.

- H.R.3315 : READY Act

Sponsor: Rep Kelly, Sue W. [NY-19] (introduced 11/10/1999) Cosponsors (33) Committees: House Education and the Workforce; House Judiciary; House Ways and Means Latest Major Action: 11/23/1999 Referred to House subcommittee. Status: Referred to the Subcommittee on Crime.

=== Senate ===
- S.CON.RES.98 : A concurrent resolution urging compliance with the Hague Convention on the Civil Aspects of International Child Abduction.

Sponsor: Sen DeWine, Mike [OH] (introduced 3/23/2000) Cosponsors (37) Committees: Senate Foreign Relations Latest Major Action: 4/26/2000 Placed on Senate Legislative Calendar under General Orders. Calendar No. 522.

- S.RES.239 : A resolution expressing the sense of the Senate that Nadia Dabbagh, who was abducted from the United States, should be returned home to her mother, Ms. Maureen Dabbagh.

Sponsor: Sen Robb, Charles S. [VA] (introduced 11/19/1999) Cosponsors (1) Committees: Senate Foreign Relations Latest Major Action: 7/19/2000 Passed/agreed to in Senate. Status: Resolution agreed to in Senate without amendment and with a preamble by Unanimous Consent.

- S.51 : Violence Against Women Act II

Sponsor: Sen Biden, Joseph R., Jr. [DE] (introduced 1/19/1999) Cosponsors (46) Committees: Senate Judiciary Latest Major Action: 1/19/1999 Referred to Senate committee. Status: Read twice and referred to the Committee on Judiciary.

- S.2710 : International Parental Kidnapping Grandparents' Right Act of 2000

Sponsor: Sen Thompson, Fred [TN] (introduced 6/9/2000) Cosponsors (1) Committees: Senate Judiciary Latest Major Action: 6/9/2000 Referred to Senate committee. Status: Read twice and referred to the Committee on the Judiciary.

- S.2787 : Violence Against Women Act of 2000

Sponsor: Sen Biden, Joseph R., Jr. [DE] (introduced 6/26/2000) Cosponsors (74) Committees: Senate Judiciary Latest Major Action: 7/12/2000 Placed on Senate Legislative Calendar under General Orders. Calendar No. 676.

== 103rd Congress 1993-1994 ==
=== House ===
- H.R.3378 : International Parental Kidnapping Crime Act of 1993

Sponsor: Rep Gekas, George W. [PA-17] (introduced 10/27/1993) Cosponsors (None) Committees: House Judiciary House Reports: 103-390 Latest Major Action: 12/2/1993 Became Public Law No: 103–173.

== 102nd Congress 1991-1992 ==
=== House ===
- H.J.RES.266 : Designating the week beginning August 4, 1991, as "International Parental Child Abduction Awareness Week".

Sponsor: Rep Solarz, Stephen J. [NY-13] (introduced 6/6/1991) Cosponsors (70) Committees: House Post Office and Civil Service Latest Major Action: 6/12/1991 Referred to House subcommittee. Status: Referred to the Subcommittee on Census and Population.

- H.R.2055 : International Parental Kidnapping Crime Act of 1991

Sponsor: Rep Gekas, George W. [PA-17] (introduced 4/24/1991) Cosponsors (3) Committees: House Judiciary Latest Major Action: 6/7/1991 Referred to House subcommittee. Status: Referred to the Subcommittee on Crime and Criminal Justice.

=== Senate ===
- S.J.RES.143 : A joint resolution to designate the week of August 4 through August 10, 1991, as the "International Parental Child Abduction Awareness Week".

Sponsor: Sen Riegle, Donald W., Jr. [MI] (introduced 5/9/1991) Cosponsors (5) Committees: Senate Judiciary Latest Major Action: 5/9/1991 Referred to Senate committee. Status: Read twice and referred to the Committee on Judiciary.

- S.1263 : A bill to amend title 18 of the United States Code to punish as a Federal criminal offense the acts of international parental child kidnapping.

Sponsor: Sen Dixon, Alan J. [IL] (introduced 6/11/1991) Cosponsors (8) Committees: Senate Judiciary Latest Major Action: 6/11/1991 Referred to Senate committee. Status: Read twice and referred to the Committee on Judiciary.

== 101st Congress 1989-1990 ==
=== House ===
- H.R.3622 : To require that the parents or legal guardians of a minor consent to the issuance of a passport to that minor.

Sponsor: Rep Saxton, Jim [NJ-13] (introduced 11/8/1989) Cosponsors (10) Committees: House Foreign Affairs Latest Major Action: 11/20/1989 Referred to House subcommittee. Status: Referred to the Subcommittee on International Operations.

- H.R.3623 : International Parental Child Abduction Act of 1989

Sponsor: Rep Saxton, Jim [NJ-13] (introduced 11/8/1989) Cosponsors (23) Committees: House Judiciary Latest Major Action: 11/14/1989 Referred to House subcommittee. Status: Referred to the Subcommittee on Criminal Justice.

- H.R.3759 : International Parental Child Abduction Act of 1989

Sponsor: Rep Gekas, George W. [PA-17] (introduced 11/20/1989) Cosponsors (None) Committees: House Judiciary Latest Major Action: 9/27/1990 House committee/subcommittee actions. Status: Subcommittee Hearings Held.

=== Senate ===
- S.J.RES.363 : A joint resolution to designate the week of October 22 through October 28, 1990, as the "International Parental Child Abduction Awareness Week".

Sponsor: Sen Riegle, Donald W., Jr. [MI] (introduced 9/13/1990) Cosponsors (13) Committees: Senate Judiciary Latest Major Action: 9/13/1990 Referred to Senate committee. Status: Read twice and referred to the Committee on Judiciary.

- S.185 : A bill to amend title 18 of the United States Code to punish as a Federal criminal offense the crimes of international parental child abduction.

Sponsor: Sen Dixon, Alan J. [IL] (introduced 1/25/1989) Cosponsors (13) Committees: Senate Judiciary; House Judiciary Latest Major Action: 10/28/1990 Referred to House committee. Status: Referred to the House Committee on Judiciary.

== 100th Congress 1987-1988 ==
=== House ===
- H.R.2673 : International Child Abduction Act

Sponsor: Rep Lantos, Tom [CA-11] (introduced 6/11/1987) Cosponsors (38) Committees: House Judiciary; House Ways and Means Latest Major Action: 2/3/1988 House committee/subcommittee actions. Status: Subcommittee Hearings Held.

- H.R.3971 : International Child Abduction Remedies Act

Sponsor: Rep Lantos, Tom [CA-11] (introduced 2/18/1988) Cosponsors (2) Committees: House Judiciary House Reports: 100-525 Latest Major Action: 4/29/1988 Became Public Law No: 100–300.

- H.R.3972 : A bill to facilitate the implementation of the 1980 Hague Convention on the Civil Aspects of International Child Abduction.

Sponsor: Rep Lantos, Tom [CA-11] (introduced 2/18/1988) Cosponsors (None) Committees: House Ways and Means Latest Major Action: 2/25/1988 Referred to House subcommittee. Status: Referred to Subcommittee on Public Assistance and Unemployment Compensation.

=== Senate ===
- S.1347 : International Child Abduction Act

Sponsor: Sen Simon, Paul [IL] (introduced 6/9/1987) Cosponsors (18) Committees: Senate Judiciary Latest Major Action: 2/23/1988 Senate committee/subcommittee actions. Status: Subcommittee on Courts and Administrative Practice. Hearings held.

- S.2059 : A bill to amend title 18, United States Code, to punish as a Federal criminal offense the crimes of international parental abduction.

Sponsor: Sen Dixon, Alan J. [IL] (introduced 2/17/1988) Cosponsors (None) Committees: Senate Judiciary Latest Major Action: 2/17/1988 Referred to Senate committee. Status: Read twice and referred to the Committee on Judiciary.

- S.AMDT.881 to S.1394 To allocate funds for support and review of international parental child abduction cases.

Sponsor: Sen Dixon, Alan J. [IL] (introduced 10/6/1987) Cosponsors (4) Latest Major Action: 10/6/1987 Senate amendment agreed to. Status: Amendment SP 881 agreed to in Senate by Voice Vote.

- S.AMDT.907 to S.1394 To facilitate implementation of the 1980 Hague Convention on the Civil Aspects of International Child Abduction, and for other purposes.

Sponsor: Sen Simon, Paul [IL] (introduced 10/8/1987) Cosponsors (15) Latest Major Action: 10/8/1987 Senate amendment agreed to. Status: Amendment SP 907 agreed to in Senate by Voice Vote.

== 96th Congress 1979-1980 ==
=== Senate ===
- Parental Kidnapping Prevention Act

Sponsor: Malcolm Wallop [WY], Latest Major Action: Signed into law in 1980. The PKPA is codified at 28 U.S.C. 1738A.

== See also ==
- List of hearings on international child abduction by US Congress
