= Donald Wildmon =

American Methodist minister (1938–2023)

- Born: Donald Ellis Wildmon; January 18, 1938; Ripley, Mississippi, U.S.
- Died: December 28, 2023 (aged 85); Tupelo, Mississippi, U.S.
- Education: Millsaps College; Candler School of Theology
- Occupations: Minister; author; radio host; consumer activist
- Years active: 1977–2010
- Known for: Founder, American Family Radio and American Family Association
- Spouse: Lynda Lou Bennett (m. 1961)
- Children: 4

Donald Ellis Wildmon (January 18, 1938 – December 28, 2023) was an American ordained United Methodist minister, author, radio host, and founder and chairman of the American Family Association and American Family Radio.

== Life and career ==
Donald Ellis Wildmon was born in Ripley, Mississippi, the son of Johnnie Bernice (née Tigrett), a schoolteacher, and Ellis Clifton Wildmon, a civil servant. Wildmon graduated from Millsaps College in 1960. In 1961, he married Lynda Lou Bennett, with whom he had two sons and two daughters. From 1961 to 1963, he served in the U.S. Army. He gained his Master of Divinity (M.Div.) from Emory University's Candler School of Theology in 1965.

In June 1977, he moved to Tupelo, Mississippi, to establish the National Federation for Decency (NFD), the predecessor to the modern American Family Association, because after watching television one night in December 1976 he felt that no primetime television program was appropriate for his family with young children. With a membership of 1,400, NFD's first television advertiser boycott was during spring 1978 and against Sears for sponsoring All in the Family, Charlie's Angels, and Three's Company. Sears withdrew sponsorship of the latter two programs.

In February 1980, Wildmon founded the Coalition for Better Television (CBTV), this time with the help of Jerry Falwell and claiming a nationwide membership of 5 million. However, CBTV disbanded and Wildmon started Christian Leaders for Responsible Television without Falwell's involvement.

In 1986, the owners of the 7-Eleven convenience store chain pulled adult magazines from its stores after a boycott by the NFD.

=== Campaign for Decency ===
Throughout the late 1970s, Wildmon actively protested television series that he thought promoted immoral lifestyles. He spoke against such programs as Three's Company, M*A*S*H and Dallas.

=== Damned in the U.S.A. ===
In 1991, the British television documentary Damned in the U.S.A., made for Channel 4's Without Walls arts series and directed by Paul Yule, about the then current state of censorship in the United States, chronicled the battle between Wildmon and artists Andres Serrano and Robert Mapplethorpe. The documentary won the International Emmy for Best Documentary, amongst several other awards. Wildmon sued the producers for $8 million in damages after a distributor got the rights to show the film in the United States, stating that he had signed a contract with the producers that prevented distribution in the USA. A federal court found that Wildmon's contract did not support his claim concerning distribution of the film and the documentary was released in 50 cities nationwide.

=== Illness and retirement ===
On August 18, 2009, Tim Wildmon released the news via email that his father had been admitted to the North Mississippi Medical Center in Tupelo over the weekend of August 15–16, with what was thought to be a serious case of meningitis. After running tests, however, doctors determined that he had Saint Louis encephalitis, a disease usually contracted from mosquitoes. He spent 121 days in the hospital and rehabilitation, and later underwent surgery for cancer on his left eye. On March 3, 2010, it was announced that Wildmon was stepping down as chairman of the American Family Association. His son Tim was expected to become the new chairman.

On December 28, 2023, Wildmon died in Tupelo, Mississippi, at the age of 85, due to complications from Lewy body dementia.

== Publications ==
- Wildmon, Donald E. (1975) Stand up to Life. Abingdon Press. ISBN 978-0-687-39290-2
- Wildmon, D. (1985) Home Invaders. David C. Cook. ISBN 978-0-89693-521-1
- Wildmon, D. (1986) The Case Against Pornography. David C. Cook. ISBN 978-0-89693-178-7
- Wildmon, D. (and Randall Nulton; 1989) Don Wildmon: The Man the Networks Love to Hate. Bristol. ISBN 978-0-917851-14-8
- Wildmon, D. (1997) Following the Carpenter: Parables to Inspire Obedience in the Christian Life. Thomas Nelson. ISBN 978-0-7852-7215-1
- Wildmon, D. (2009) Speechless: Silencing the Christians: How Secular Liberals and Homosexual Activists are Outlawing Christianity (and Judaism) to Force Their Sexual Agenda on America. Richard Vigilante. ISBN 0-9800763-3-1
- Friedeman, Matt. Wildmon, Donald E. (2001) In the Fight: A Mississippi Conservative Swings Back. Well Writers' Guild. ISBN 978-0-9711004-1-1

== See also ==
- Christian right
- Culture war
- Speechless: Silencing the Christians
- Mary Whitehouse, seen as the British equivalent to Wildmon
