= List of hearings on international child abduction by US Congress =

List of hearings on international child abduction
Title	Government Body	date
A parent’s worst nightmare : the heartbreak of international child abductions: hearing before the Committee on International Relations, House of Representatives, One Hundred Eighth Congress, second session,	House. Committee on International Relations	June 22, 2004
International child abduction : the absence of rights of abducted American citizens in Saudi Arabia : hearing before the Subcommittee on Human Rights and Wellness of the Committee on Government Reform, House of Representatives	House. Committee on Government Reform. Subcommittee on Human Rights and Wellness	July 9, 2003
Investigation into abductions of American children to Saudi Arabia : hearings before the Committee on Government Reform, House of Representatives	House. Committee on Government Reform	June 12; October 2,3; and December 4,11; 2002
An AMBER Alert national system : hearing before the Subcommittee on Technology, Terrorism, and Government Information of the Committee on the Judiciary, United States Senate	Senate. Committee on the Judiciary. Subcommittee on Technology Terrorism and Government Information	September 4, 2002
Foreign affairs : specific action plan needed to improve response to parental child abductions : report to the Chairman, Committee on International Relations, House of Representatives	United States. General Accounting Office	2000
The Justice Department’s response to international parental kidnaping: hearing before the Subcommittee on Criminal Justice Oversight of the Committee on the Judiciary	Senate. Committee on the Judiciary. Subcommittee on Criminal Justice Oversight	October 27, 1999
International child abduction : implementation of the Hague Convention on civil aspects of international child abduction : hearing before the Committee on International Relations, House of Representatives	House. Committee on International Relations	October 14, 1999
United States Responses to International Parental Abduction, S. Hrg. 105-845	Senate. Committee on Foreign Relations	October 1, 1998
International child abduction : hearing before the Subcommittee on International Operations of the Committee on Foreign Affairs, House of Representatives	House. Committee on Foreign Affairs. Subcommittee on International Operations	October 16, 1990
International Parental Child Abduction Act of 1989 : hearing before the Subcommittee on Criminal Justice of the Committee on the Judiciary, House of Representatives, One Hundred First Congress, second session, on H.R. 3759	House. Committee on the Judiciary. Subcommittee on Criminal Justice	September 27, 1990
International child abduction : hearing before the Subcommittees on Human Rights and International Organizations and on International Operations of the Committee on Foreign Affairs, House of Representatives	House. Committee on Foreign Affairs. Subcommittee on Human Rights and International Organizations, Subcommittee on International Operations.,	September 14, 1988
International Child Abduction Act : hearing before the Subcommittee on Courts and Administrative Practice of the Committee on the Judiciary, United States Senate, One Hundredth Congress, second session on S. 1347	Senate. Committee on the Judiciary. Subcommittee on Courts and Administrative Practice	February 23, 1988
International Child Abduction Act : hearing before the Subcommittee on Administrative Law and Governmental Relations of the Committee on the Judiciary, House of Representatives, One Hundredth Congress, second session, on H.R. 2673 and H.R. 3971	House. Committee on the Judiciary. Subcommittee on Administrative Law and Governmental Relations	February 3, 1988
Oversight hearing on the Missing Children’s Assistance Act : hearing before the Subcommittee on Human Resources of the Committee on Education and Labor, House of Representatives	House. Committee on Education and Labor. Subcommittee on Human Resources	August 4, 1986
Parental kidnaping and child support : hearing before the Subcommittee on Juvenile Justice of the Committee on the Judiciary, United States Senate, Ninety-ninth Congress, first session, on problems of domestic and international kidnapping and child support enforcement	Senate. Committee on the Judiciary. Subcommittee on Juvenile Justice	July 19, 1985
Private sector initiatives regarding missing children : hearing before the Subcommittee on Juvenile Justice of the Committee on the Judiciary, United States Senate, Ninety-ninth Congress, first session, on the issue of missing children: runaways, parental abduction, and kidnaping, and the responses of the private sector to this problem	Senate. Committee on the Judiciary. Subcommittee on Juvenile Justice	May 22, 1985
Missing Children’s Assistance Act : hearings before the Subcommittee on Juvenile Justice of the Committee on the Judiciary, United States Senate, Ninety-eighth Congress, second session, on S. 2014	Senate. Committee on the Judiciary. Subcommittee on Juvenile Justice	February 7,21; March 8,13, and 21; 1984
Parental kidnaping (sic) : hearing before the Subcommittee on Juvenile Justice of the Committee on the Judiciary, United States Senate, Ninety-eighth Congress, first session, to examine available and proposed means to resolve the cases of interstate and international parental kidnaping (sic)	Senate. Committee on the Judiciary. Subcommittee on Juvenile Justice	May 25, 1983
Implementation of the Parental Kidnaping Prevention Act of 1980 : oversight hearing before the Subcommittee on Crime of the Committee on the Judiciary, House of Representatives	House. Committee on the Judiciary. Subcommittee on Crime	September 24, 1981
Parental kidnaping : hearing before the Subcommittee on Crime of the Committee on the Judiciary, House of Representatives, Ninety-sixth Congress, second session, on H.R. 1290, parental kidnaping	House. Committee on the Judiciary. Subcommittee on Crime	June 24, 1980
Parental kidnaping prevention act of 1979, S. 105 : addendum to joint hearing before the Subcommittee on Criminal Justice of the Committee on the Judiciary and the Subcommittee on Child and Human Development of the Committee on Labor and Human Resources	Senate. Committee on the Judiciary. Subcommittee on Criminal Justice; Committee on Labor and Human Resources. Subcommittee on Child and Human Development	January 30, 1980
Parental kidnaping, 1979 : hearing before the Subcommittee on Child and Human Development of the Committee on Labor and Human Resources, United States Senate, Ninety-sixth Congress, first session, on examination of the problem of “child snatching,”	Senate. Committee on Labor and Human Resources. Subcommittee on Child and Human Development	April 17, 1979

== See also ==
- International child abduction
- International child abduction in the United States
- List of bills related to international child abduction by US Congress
