= American Family Ass'n v. City and County of San Francisco =

American Family Association v. City and County of San Francisco
- Court: United States District Court for the Northern District of California
- Full case name: American Family Association, Inc.; Donald Wildmon; Kerusso Ministries; Family Research Council v. City and County of San francisco; Leslie Katz
- Decided: January 16, 2002

Case history
- Prior action: District Court dismissed Plaintiff's allegations

Holding
- Plaintiff's Establishment Clause claim was dismissed because Defendants' actions had a secular purpose, did not primary effect on inhibiting religion, and did not create excessive entanglement with religion. Plaintiff's free exercise claim was dismissed because Defendants' actions were neither regulatory nor proscriptive. Plaintiffs' hybrid free exercise/free speech claim was dismissed because Defendants' did not sanction or threaten to sanction Plaintiff's speech.

Court membership
- Judges sitting: John T. Noonan, Jr., Michael Daly Hawkins, and A. Wallace Tashima

American Family Association v. City and County of San Francisco is a case in which the American Family Association (AFA) challenged the City and County of San Francisco's actions opposing an AFA sponsored advertisement campaign as a violation of the First Amendment to the United States Constitution.

In 1998, a full-page advertisement regarding homosexuality and Christianity was placed in the San Francisco Chronicle as part of the nationwide "Truth in Love" campaign by several Christian right organizations. The advertisement stated, "God abhors any form of sexual sin," including homosexuality, and further stated that many people have walked out of homosexuality into sexual celibacy and marriage through the help of Jesus Christ. The advertisement was labeled by the City and County of San Francisco as "hateful rhetoric," which incites hate crimes. San Francisco officials discouraged local TV and radio stations from running Truth in Love advertisements.

In October 1999, the AFA filed the suit against the City and County of San Francisco with support from Family Research Council and Virginia based Kerusso Ministries. The suit claims the City and County of San Francisco violated the First Amendment's Establishment Clause by expressing hostility towards a religion and violated the First Amendment's Free Speech and Free Exercise clauses by the city's attempt to prevent "Truth in Love" advertisements.

In June 2000, Oakland District court ruled the Defendant's actions did not violate the First Amendment and stated the City and County of San Francisco was only doing its duty to address public safety by encouraging local media not to run the advertisements. The AFA appealed the decision and the United States District Court for the Northern District of California affirmed the District court ruling.

The majority opinion was written by Michael Daly Hawkins and the dissenting/concurring opinion was written by John T. Noonan, Jr.

== Background ==
On October 19, 1998, the San Francisco Board of Supervisors, led by Leslie Katz, wrote a letter to the AFA in response to an ad placed in the newspaper. The letter stated:

Supervisor Leslie Katz denounces your rhetoric against gays, lesbians and transgendered people. What happened to Matthew Shepard is in part due to the message being espoused by your groups that gays and lesbians are not worthy of the most basic equal rights and treatment. It is not an exaggeration to say that there is a direct correlation between these acts of discrimination, such as when gays and lesbians are called sinful and when major religious organizations say they can change if they tried, and the horrible crimes committed against gays and lesbians.

During the same time, the City and County of San Francisco passed two resolutions. The first resolution was summarized by Judge Hawkins as:

The first, Resolution No. 234-99, condemned the murder of Billy Jack Gaither in Alabama following a reported unwanted gay sexual advance, and urged Alabama lawmakers to extend their hate crimes legislation to include offenses related to sexual orientation. The final paragraph of the Resolution "calls for the Religious Right to take accountability for the impact of their long-standing rhetoric denouncing gays and lesbians, which leads to a climate of mistrust and discrimination that can open the door to horrible crimes such as those committed against Mr. Gaither."

The second resolution was summarized by Judge Hawkins as:

The second resolution, No. 873-98, was specifically directed at "anti-gay" television advertisements. It recited that a coalition had introduced a nationwide television advertisement campaign to encourage gays and lesbians to change their sexual orientation, and listed one of the Plaintiffs by name. The resolution asserted that the organizations "promote an agenda which denies basic equal rights for gays and lesbians and routinely state their opposition to toleration of gay and lesbian citizens" and stated that a "prominent San Francisco newspaper" chose to accept and publish a printed advertisement campaign. The resolution contended that "the vast majority of medical, psychological and sociological evidence supports the conclusion that sexual orientation can not be changed" and that ads insinuating as much are "erroneous and full of lies." The resolution also stated that ads suggesting gays or lesbians are "immoral and undesirable create an atmosphere which validates oppression of gays and lesbians" and encourages maltreatment of them. The Resolution claimed a "marked increase in anti-gay violence" that coincided with "defamatory and erroneous campaigns" against gays and lesbians. It then urged "local television stations not to broadcast advertising campaigns aimed at `converting' homosexuals."

== See also ==
- Ex-gay
- Christianity and homosexuality
- SLAPP lawsuit
