= Speechless =

Speechless may refer to:

== Films, plays, books and television ==
- Speechless (1994 film), a 1994 American film
- Speechless (2012 film) (無言 Wu Yan), a 2012 Hong Kong film
- Speechless (play), a 2011 play by Polly Teale
- Speechless (TV series), an American television comedy series
- Speechless: Silencing the Christians, a 2008 television documentary series hosted by Janet Parshall
- Speechless, a 2001 graphic novel collection by Peter Kuper
- Speechless: Controlling Words, Controlling Minds, a 2021 nonfiction book by political commentator Michael J. Knowles

== Music ==
=== Albums ===
- Speechless (Steven Curtis Chapman album)
- Speechless (Fred Frith album)
- Speechless (Kelly Richey album)

=== Songs ===
- "Speechless" (Alicia Keys song), 2010
- "Speechless" (Candyland song), 2015
- "Speechless" (Ciara song), 2010
- "Speechless" (D-Side song), 2003
- "Speechless" (Dan + Shay song), 2018
- "Speechless" (Jay Park and Cha Cha Malone song), 2010
- "Speechless" (Lady Gaga song), 2009
- "Speechless" (Melissa O'Neil song), 2005
- "Speechless" (Michael Jackson song), 2001
- "Speechless" (Robin Schulz song), 2018
- "Two Grey Rooms", a 1991 ballad, originally without lyrics and titled "Speechless" by Joni Mitchell
- "Speechless", a 1980 song by City Boy
- "Speechless", a 1985 song by Robert Wyatt from Old Rottenhat
- "Speechless", a 1986 song by Status Quo from In the Army Now
- "Speechless", a 2003 song by Beyoncé Knowles from Dangerously in Love
- "Speechless", a 2005 song by The Veronicas from The Secret Life of...
- "Speechless", a 2013 song by Bleed from Within from Uprising
- "Speechless", a 2014 song by Memphis May Fire from Unconditional
- "Speechless", a 2021 song by Nas from Magic
- "Speechless" (Aladdin song), a song from Disney's remake of Aladdin

== See also ==
- Aphasia, a medical condition resulting in being speechless
- Voiceless
