= Bryan Fischer =

American sociopolitical commentator (born 1951)

- Born: Bryan Jonathan Fischer; April 8, 1951; Oklahoma City, Oklahoma, U.S.
- Died: October 9, 2025 (aged 74)
- Occupations: Conservative radio host, blogger, political activist
- Children: 2

Bryan Jonathan Fischer (April 8, 1951 - October 9, 2025) was the former Director of Issues Analysis for the American Family Association (AFA). He hosted the talk radio program Focal Point on American Family Radio and posted on the AFA-run blog Instant Analysis (formerly Rightly Concerned).

Fischer opposed abortion, national health care, gay adoption, civil unions, and same-sex marriage. Fischer's comments about homosexuality caused the AFA to be designated a hate group by the Southern Poverty Law Center (SPLC) in November 2010. To avoid being classified as a hate group, the AFA has officially repudiated Fischer's views on Muslims, Native Americans, Hispanics, and African Americans, as well his claims that the Holocaust was caused by homosexuals, that homosexuality should be outlawed, and that Hillary Clinton is a lesbian.

Focal Point was abruptly removed from the AFR lineup in 2021 following the 4th of July weekend. AFR offered no explanation for cancelling the show.

== Biography ==
Fischer, born in Oklahoma City and later raised in Fresno, California, has an undergraduate degree in philosophy from Stanford University, and holds a graduate degree in theology from Dallas Theological Seminary. Fischer served at the Cole Community Church in Boise, Idaho and founded the Cole Center for biblical studies and was the church's director for thirteen years. Fischer then founded Community Church of the Valley and was a senior pastor for twelve years.

In 2004, he co-founded the Keep the Commandments Coalition, a group dedicated to keeping a Ten Commandments monument in Julia Davis Park in Boise. From 2000 to 2005, he served as a commissioner for the city's Park and Recreation Department.

Fischer joined the American Family Association in 2009.

== Views and activities ==
=== Minorities ===
Fischer has said that welfare has "destroyed the African-American family" by "offering financial rewards to women who have more children out of wedlock" thereby incentivizing "fornication rather than marriage" creating "disastrous social consequences of people who rut like rabbits." The AFA has repudiated the characterisation of minorities as "people who rut like rabbits," as well as the view that immigration should be restricted because Hispanics are "socialist by nature" and vote Democratic because it allows them to "benefit from the plunder of the wealth of the United States."

Fischer has argued that "many of the tribal reservations today remain mired in poverty and alcoholism because many Native Americans continue to cling to the darkness of indigenous superstition instead of coming into the light of Christianity and assimilating into Christian culture." The AFA has repudiated his view that "Superstition, savagery and sexual immorality" morally disqualified Native Americans from "sovereign control of American soil."

=== Religious exercise ===
Fischer has said that Muslim students coming to US campuses are setting up Muslim Students' Associations, whose "agenda is dedicated to destroy the host country" and compared them to parasites, adding "these university campuses are dangerous places for Islamic extremism". According to him, the only shot at building a democracy in an Islamic land is a mass conversion of its people to Christianity, for which he suggests sending missionaries "right after we send in the Marines to neutralize whatever threat has been raised against the United States". He suggests "returning with lethal force if the forces in your country threaten us again.

He has stated that Muslims are worshipping a demon, and "every time we allow a mosque to go up in one of our communities, it's like planting an improvised explosive device right in the heart of your city and we have no idea when one of these devices is going to go off." He stated that the First Amendment to the United States Constitution protects only the religious practice of Christianity, writing in a blog post "the real object of the amendment was, not to countenance, much less to advance [Islam], or Judaism, or infidelity... so the purpose of the First Amendment was most decidedly not to "approve, support, (or) accept" any "religion" other than Christianity." Fischer has suggested Jews and Muslims are not included in religious freedom protections in the US, saying: "I have contended for years that the First Amendment, as given by the Founders, provides religious liberty protections for Christianity only." He later wrote: "We are a Christian nation and not a Jewish or Muslim one." He affirmed this belief as well in a 2018 article regarding the First Amendment rights of prisoners to practice their religion under federal law, stating that "religions other than Christianity have no First Amendment rights whatsoever under the federal constitution."

MormonVoices, a group associated with Foundation for Apologetic Information & Research, included Fischer on its Top Ten Anti-Mormon Statements of 2011 list for saying "Mormonism is not an orthodox Christian faith. It just is not ... It's very clear that the founding fathers did not intend to preserve automatically religious liberty for non-Christian faiths."

In a 2015 press release denouncing Fischer's views, the AFA stated "AFA rejects the idea expressed by Bryan Fischer that 'free exercise of religion' only applies to Christians. Consequently, AFA rejects Bryan's assertions that Muslims should not be granted permits to build mosques in the United States."

In 2018 he wrote about the "dangerous trend" of Muslims running for political office in the United States, calling Islam a "scourge" and "the Ebola virus of culture". He further called for states to institute religious tests for those in or running for office, citing examples from some states effective during the late 18th century.

=== Homosexuality and Nazism ===
Fischer believes that homosexuality is "immoral, unnatural, and unhealthy". In 2007, Fischer hosted an event with former American Family Association California leader Scott Lively to promote the view that "homosexuality was at the heart of Nazism," a claim which is rejected by historians.

In May 2010, Fischer wrote a blog post on the AFA website and RenewAmerica detailing purported allegations that Adolf Hitler was a homosexual, that "the Nazi Party began in a gay bar in Munich," and concluded by claiming that the Holocaust (which actually included gay victims of Nazi persecution) was caused by homosexuals in the Nazi German military: "Nazi Germany became the horror that it was because it rejected both Christianity and its clear teaching about human sexuality." On American Family Talk radio, Fischer repeated the claim that Hitler was a homosexual, and stated that Hitler recruited homosexuals to be storm troopers, because "homosexual soldiers basically had no limits and the savagery and brutality they were willing to inflict".

In April 2013, Fischer claimed that "Homofascists" will treat Christians like Jews in the Holocaust and later that year he repeated on American Family Talk that Hitler started the Nazi party "in a gay bar in Munich" and that "[Adolf Hitler] couldn't get straights to be vicious enough in being his enforcers."

The Southern Poverty Law Center, through its Teaching Tolerance program, has encouraged schools across the U.S. to hold a "Mix It Up at Lunch" day in order to encourage students to break up cliques and prevent bullying. In late 2012, the AFA called the project – begun 11 years earlier and held in more than 2,500 schools – "a nationwide push to promote the homosexual lifestyle in public schools", urging parents to keep their children home from school on October 30, 2012, and to call the schools to protest the event. "I was surprised that they completely lied about what Mix It Up Day is", Maureen Costello, the director of the center's Teaching Tolerance project, which organizes the program, told The New York Times: "It was a cynical, fear-mongering tactic." In October, Fischer was taken off air during a CNN interview with Carol Costello for repeating his belief that "Hitler recruited homosexuals around him to make up his Stormtroopers".

In 2012, as jury selection was to begin in a trial on charges of kidnapping of a lesbian couple's daughter, Fischer wrote on Twitter in support of kidnapping of children from same-sex households and smuggling them to what he calls "normal" homes. Fischer also reiterated his views on his radio show, and on video. In January 2013, he compared consensual sex between people of the same gender to pedophilia, incest and bestiality. In January 2013, Fischer compared the Boy Scouts of America's change in views on gay scouts and scoutmasters to Jerry Sandusky, saying allowing gay scoutmasters was inviting pedophiles into the tents of children. In March 2013, Fischer compared homosexuality to bank robbery when Senator Portman announced his views on same-sex marriage had changed due to having a gay son. Fischer also stated that homosexuality should be banned like trans fats for being "a hazard to human health" and likened homosexuals to thieves, murderers and child molesters.

On January 28, 2015, Tim Wildmon, President of the American Family Association demoted Fischer from being a spokesperson. Fischer went on to state that he will still be hosting the AFA's American Family Talk radio. In order to avoid being categorised as a hate group, the AFA issued a press release denouncing some of Fischer's views, rejecting his claim that Hillary Clinton is a lesbian, and stating: "AFA rejects the statement by Bryan Fischer that, 'Homosexuality gave us Adolph Hitler, and homosexuals in the military gave us the Brown Shirts, the Nazi war machine and six million dead Jews.' AFA rejects the policy advocated by Bryan Fischer that homosexual conduct should be illegal. AFA rejects the notion advocated by Bryan Fischer that, 'We need an underground railroad to protect innocent children from same-sex households'."

When the Supreme Court ruled on Obergefell v. Hodges on June 26, 2015, Fischer described it as an "a date which will live in infamy", tweeting that "6/26 is now our 9/11" and "the day the twin towers of truth and righteousness were blown up by moral jihadists." Fischer described the Supreme Court justices who voted to legalize same-sex marriage as "rainbow jihadists and they blasted the twin pillars" and described social conservatives as "serfs on a plantation that's being run by cultural elites who wear black robes and use their gavels like the slaveholders of old used to use their whips."

=== Activities ===
In November 2010, the SPLC changed their listing of the AFA from a group that used hate speech to the more serious one of being designated a hate group. Although these claims have not been confirmed by another group besides SPLC. The SPLC's Mark Potok said that the AFA's "propagation of known falsehoods and demonizing propaganda" was the basis for the change. Fischer's anti-gay comments were given as an example by SPLC in support of the hate group designation. The AFA rejected this notion and responded by calling the SPLC "the most dangerous hate group in America".

Fischer has voiced support for the AIDS denial movement. His guest on the January 3, 2012, edition of Focal Point was prominent AIDS denialist Peter Duesberg; Fischer strongly supported Duesberg's contention that AIDS is not caused by HIV, but by recreational drug use.

In the June 18, 2012 issue of The New Yorker magazine ("Bully Pulpit"), author Jane Mayer featured Fischer in an article describing his influence in the Republican Party and 2012 presidential election. On April 20, Fischer attacked Republican Party presidential candidate Mitt Romney's national security spokesman Richard Grenell for being openly gay. Other conservatives joined Fischer in calling for Grenell's ouster, and by May 1 Grenell resigned from the Romney campaign, in what Fischer described as a "huge win" for conservatives. During the 2012 presidential primaries, Republican Party candidates Rick Santorum, Michele Bachmann, Herman Cain, Newt Gingrich, and Tim Pawlenty were guests on Fischer's show, but Romney was not invited.

In the article (the facts of which Mayer says "were ... all checked with Fischer, and where he had factual objections, his caveats were included"), Mayer also quotes Fischer as saying that President Barack Obama "despises the constitution, ... nurtures a hatred for the white man", and aims to "destroy capitalism". Fischer believes that sexual orientation is "always a matter of choice", and strongly opposes what he calls the "morally and intellectually bankrupt theory of evolution".

On the issue of religion and tax policy, Fischer believes that the progressive income taxes and estate taxes violate the Eighth and Tenth Commandments, because (he feels) by taxing the income and estates of the well-off, the government "steals and covets" their wealth.

In April 2013, Fischer commented on the case of Carla Hale, a lesbian teacher fired from the Catholic school she worked for when her partner was named in her mother's obituary, saying that it was right for the school to fire her based on her "immoral sexual behavior". He argued that just as shoplifters are discriminated against, employers should discriminate against those who engage in aberrant sexual behavior and other supposed forms of immorality.

In January 2014, Fischer called the gay weddings at the 2014 Grammy Awards an abomination and said that same-sex parenting is a form of child abuse. The following month, Fischer, in comments about an Arizona bill that would have allowed businesses asserting their religious beliefs to deny service to gay and lesbian customers, referred to those opposing the bill as "jack-booted homo-fascist thugs, who want to use the totalitarian and tyrannical power of the state to send men of faith to jail. That sounds far more like Nazi Germany than the United States of America."

=== Departure from American Family Association ===
On July 6, 2021, Fischer stated on his Twitter page that "My Focal Point radio program has come to an end" and only referenced his personal social media pages as a way people could now "stay in touch with me." American Family Association President Tim Wildmon also announced the end of Fischer's Focal Point, stating among other things, that “American Family Radio will no longer air Focal Point with Bryan Fischer" and "we want to thank Bryan and his wife Debbie for their faithful service and we wish them well in the years ahead." AFR also released a statement claiming that they would not discuss the reason for Fischer's departure, claiming “Folks, I know many of you are frustrated and miss Bryan, but AFR does not discuss internal personnel decisions. That policy leaves us at a bit of a disadvantage, because it gives people opportunity to gossip and slander."
