= 2000 in LGBTQ rights =

This is a list of notable events in the history of LGBTQ rights that took place in the year 2000.

== Events ==
- Voters in US state of Maine reject a proposal to reinstate the ban on sexual orientation discrimination in the private sector, with 50.5 per cent against and 49.5 per cent for.

=== January ===
- 12 – The ban on lesbians and gay men serving in the United Kingdom armed forces is lifted.

=== February ===
- 14 – Jerrold Nadler, congressman from New York, introduces the Permanent Partners Immigration Act (H.R 3650) in the United States Congress.

=== March ===
- 7 – California voters approve Proposition 22, a preemptive measure stating that California will not recognize same-sex marriages, even if the marriages took place in states that permitted them.
- 15 – Equality Mississippi is formed in response to a hate-crime murder and attempts in the U.S. state to ban adoption by same-sex couples.

=== April ===
- 28—30 – Millennium March on Washington in the United States.

=== June ===
- 21 – The parliament of Scotland repeals Section 28, the law that banned local authorities from "promoting homosexuality". It is the first part of the United Kingdom to do so.

=== July ===
- 1
  - In the U.S. state of Vermont, civil union law goes into effect, granting most state-level marriage rights to registered same-sex couples.
  - Mississippi becomes the third U.S. state to ban adoption by same-sex couples.

=== November ===
- Montana governor Marc Racicot issues an executive order banning sexual orientation discrimination in the public sector.
- The Connecticut Commission on Human Rights and Opportunities, in In re John/Jane Doe, rules that gender identity discrimination is included in the existing ban on sex discrimination in the private sector.

=== December ===
- The age of consent across the United Kingdom is equalised at 16. Previously, the age of consent was 18 for homosexual acts and 16 for heterosexual acts. The equalisation took place after a long struggle, in which the Labour party eventually invoked the Parliament Acts 1911 and 1949 after the House of Lords repeatedly blocked the bill.
- Tom Vilsack, governor of the U.S. state of Iowa, rescinds an executive order he issued in 1999 banning discrimination based on sexual orientation or gender identity in the public sector. Vilsack would later reinstate the order for sexual orientation only.
- 15 – Delaware governor Thomas Carper issues an executive order banning sexual orientation discrimination in the public sector.

== Deaths ==
- December 18 – Hal Call, American businessman and homophile leader (Mattachine Society).

== See also ==
- Timeline of LGBT history – timeline of events from 12,000 BCE to present
- LGBT rights by country or territory – current legal status around the world
- LGBT social movements
