= Watchmen on the Walls =

Christian organization based in Latvia

Watchmen on the Walls (Latvian: Sargi uz mūriem) is an international evangelical ministry based in Riga, Latvia. It describes itself as "the international Christian movement that unites Christian leaders, Christian and social organizations and aims to protect Christian morals and values in society." According to a Southern Poverty Law Center (SPLC) Intelligence report the group's name derives from the Old Testament book of Nehemiah, in which the "watchmen" guard the reconstruction of Jerusalem. "The cities they guard over today, say the contemporary Watchmen, are being destroyed by homosexuality."

The group was founded by former California American Family Association director Scott Douglas Lively and New Generation Church preacher Alexey Ledyaev. Lively is a co-author of The Pink Swastika, a controversial book that falsely claims that homosexuality found in the Nazi Party contributed to the extreme militarism of Nazi Germany. Leaders of the Watchmen support conversion therapy, a controversial practice discouraged by mainstream mental health organizations as detrimental to individuals and society, (Note: Conversion therapy is discouraged by mainstream mental health organizations as not only causing harm to LGBT individuals, but also causing social harm by disseminating inaccurate views about sexual orientation and the ability of gay and bisexual people to lead happy, healthy lives.("Just the Facts About Sexual Orientation & Youth: A Primer for Principals, Educators and School Personnel". American Academy of Pediatrics, et al. 1999.)) that attempts to change sexual orientation and suppress lesbian, gay and bisexual behaviors. Watchmen leaders have told audiences at ex-gay events "one of the most important things you can do is start an ex-gay movement here." A Watchmen member was a featured keynote speaker at Focus on the Family's travelling ex-gay ministry Love Won Out in 2007.

Watchmen on the Walls is listed as a hate group by the SPLC, which considers it "a virulently anti-gay group". Being listed on SPLC's website "does not necessarily imply a group advocates or engages in violence or other criminal activity." Leaders of the Watchmen on the Walls movement insist "they do not hate gays — or anyone else." The SPLC states, "In Latvia, the Watchmen are popular among Christian fundamentalists and ethnic Russians, and are known for presiding over anti-gay rallies where gays and lesbians are pelted with bags of excrement." According to the SPLC the Watchmen have a following among Russian-speaking evangelicals in the Western U.S. among immigrants from the former Soviet Union and members are increasingly active in several cities "long known as gay-friendly enclaves", including Sacramento, Seattle, and Portland.

== See also ==
- LGBT rights in Latvia
- Christianity and homosexuality
- Ken Hutcherson
- World Congress of Families
