= Equality Mississippi =

LGBT rights organization in Mississippi, United States

- U.S. State of Mississippi
- Formation: March 15, 2000
- Founder: Jody Renaldo

Equality Mississippi (originally known as Mississippi Gay Lobby) is a statewide LGBT civil rights organization founded March 2000 in Mississippi. The organization closed in December 2008 but reopened in April 2013.

== History ==
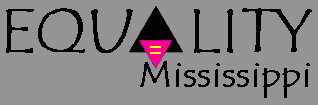
The original Equality Mississippi logo

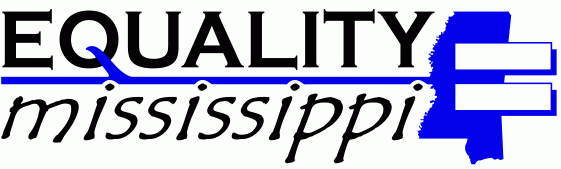
The second logo of Equality Mississippi

Equality Mississippi (EM) was founded in response to the murder of Jamie Ray Tolbert, a Laurel, Mississippi native and referred to as a friend by EM founder and executive director Jody Renaldo. Tolbert was a gay man visiting the now defunct gay nightclub Joey's On The Beach in Biloxi, Mississippi on New Year's Eve 1999. He was abducted from the bar's parking lot. His body was later found in the woods in Alabama, having been beaten and strangled. His killers, Brent David Kabat and Jeremy Shawn Bentley, were arrested two weeks later after being stopped at a roadblock in California. They were still driving Tolbert's Nissan Xterra. It's not clear if the crime was in any way related to the victim's sexuality.

The organization's original name was Mississippi Gay Lobby as it was the first chapter of the National Gay Lobby (NGL). NGL's approach to activism was that of being an Internet-only gay rights organization using its membership to send activism e-mails, letters to the editor and forum postings. After a year of being a chapter of NGL, the state chapter became independent, still keeping their name, because it felt the need to be active beyond Internet activism, felt the $25 membership dues should not be sent for nationwide activities and disagreed with a recent protest action discouraging users from using AOL.

== Notable events ==
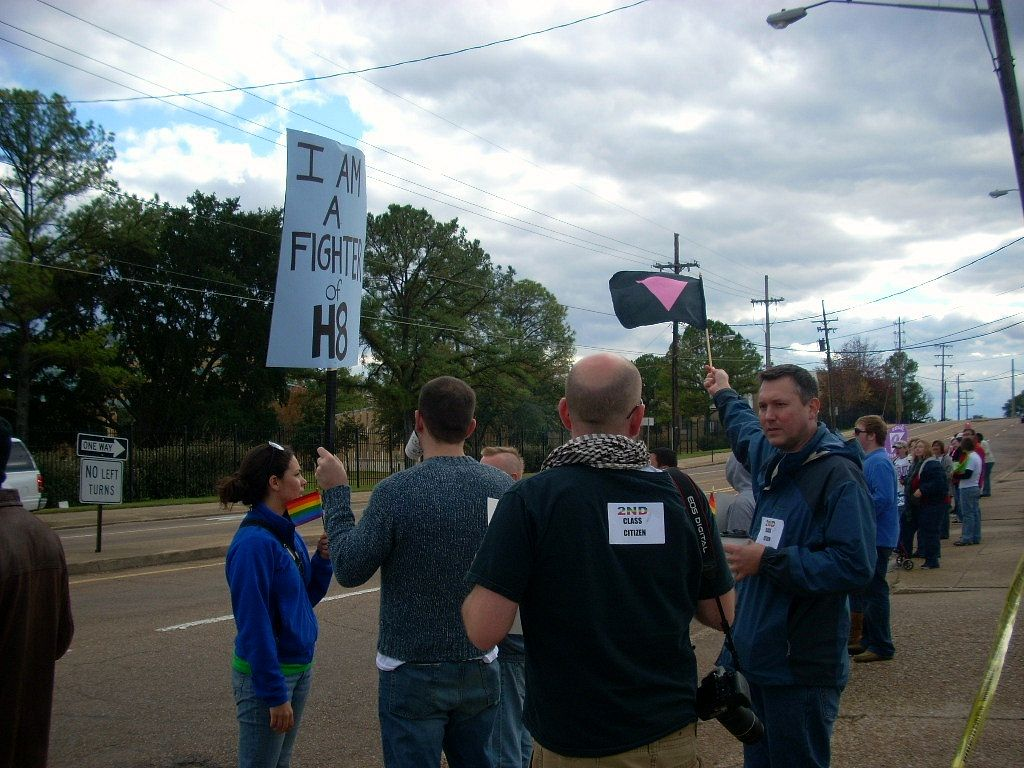
Protest rally against California Proposition 8 in Jackson, Mississippi on November 15, 2008.

In 2001 the group ran a television advertisement campaign designed to bring attention to LGBT issues in Mississippi. The advertisements were aired on local cable channels MTV, VH1 and Lifetime.

Also, in 2002, Equality Mississippi partnered with the American Civil Liberties Union of Mississippi to publish the Mississippi Lesbian, Gay, Bisexual and Transgender Rights Series, a three booklet series covering how Mississippi law affected the lives of gay and lesbian Mississippians.

=== Amicus brief to the United States Supreme Court ===
In 2003, Equality Mississippi submitted an amicus brief to the United States Supreme Court in Lawrence v. Texas. In the case, the Court struck down a Texas state law banning private consensual sex between adults of the same sex in a decision gay rights groups hailed as historic. The ruling invalidated anti-sodomy laws in 12 other states, including Mississippi.

=== Boycott of Gulfport ===
In 2003, after the Gulfport city council passed a resolution condemning the United States Supreme Court for striking down sodomy laws in the United States, Equality Mississippi began what it called the "Not One Dime" campaign, a nationwide boycott campaign against the tourist destination city.

=== Hurricane Katrina efforts ===
Following the destruction brought to the Mississippi Gulf Coast by the Hurricane Katrina, EM began providing emergency relief to gay and lesbian Mississippians who were uncomfortable in seeking help from religious organizations providing aid. Incidents of discrimination and harassment of LGBT hurricane evacuees were present and reported. The Union for Reform Judaism recommended and later provided $10,000 to EM to support their relief efforts.

=== Criticism of the American Family Association ===
In August 2001, Equality Mississippi issued a press release critical of the American Family Association (AFA), whose world headquarters is also based in Mississippi, for what it perceived as a boycott against the Girl Scouts of the USA (GSUSA) (purportedly because the GSUSA does not ban lesbian scouts or lesbian scout leaders). Equality Mississippi felt the AFA's actions of promoting American Heritage Girls as the "Christian alternative" to the GSA was because of the gay community's boycott against the Boy Scouts of America for its ban of gay scouts and gay scout leaders.

== Closing and reforming ==
Equality Mississippi posted a bulletin on MySpace stating that as of December 3, 2008, the board of directors decided, due to financial hardships, the organization was to be closed.

Four years later in April 2013, an organization having no association with the original organization or its original founder, formed and began operations using the same Equality Mississippi name.

== See also ==
- LGBT rights in the United States
- LGBT social movements
- List of LGBT rights organizations
- Marriage Equality USA
