= Tomás Fábregas =

Spanish activist (1958–1994)

- Born: Tomás Luis Fábregas Boudín; May 26, 1958; A Coruña, Spain
- Died: September 22, 1994 (aged 36); Oakland, California, U.S
- Occupation: Activist
- Years active: 1989-1994

Tomás Luis Fábregas Boudín (26 May 1958 – 22 September 1994) was a Spanish-American AIDS and LGBT rights activist.

== Biography ==
Fábregas graduated in Geography and History at the Universidade de Santiago de Compostela. A Spaniard by birth, he first came to the U.S. in 1979. He had moved to New York City to work at the UN Headquarters. Soon thereafter, he took up permanent residency in New York. He later moved to California to earn a graduate degree at UC Berkeley. In 1989, Fábregas was diagnosed as HIV-positive, and he died from AIDS-related complications on September 22, 1994, at the age of 36.

== AIDS activism ==
Soon after being diagnosed, Fábregas abandoned his professional aspirations and launched himself into AIDS activism. That same year he joined the San Francisco AIDS Foundation as a volunteer and was placed in the organization's Public Policy Department. He soon became a prominent figure in AIDS activism in San Francisco, joining the board of directors of the San Francisco AIDS Foundation and the Healing Alternatives Foundation, another local institution fighting AIDS. He was also part of the Immigration Working Group at ACT UP.

The most influential aspect of his activism concerns his opposition to the U.S. ban on the entry of HIV-positive people into the country. This policy, initially implemented in 1987 and then consolidated under the presidency of George H. W. Bush, effectively prohibited the entrance of these people to the United States with the exception of those who obtained a special waiver. In response to the policy, and together with the other members of the Immigration Working Group, he led an international campaign which managed to relocate the 1992 International AIDS Conference from Boston to Amsterdam, preventing it from being held in a country where HIV-positive speakers and attendants could be rejected at the border. Following this, Fábregas was invited to be a speaker at the opening ceremony of the conference.

The moment that received the most media attention in this campaign, and in Fábregas' whole trajectory, took place on his return to the U.S. from the conference. The activist, supported among others by the actress and then director of the AmfAR Elizabeth Taylor, publicly dared the Federal Government to arrest him and deport him at the airport when he returned to the country, as the entry ban established. The action sparked international media attention, and ended with the normal entry of Fábregas into the country, where he was received by a large group of activists. The then mayor of San Francisco, Frank Jordan, declared that day, July 25, 1992, as "Tomás Fábregas Day" in recognition of his action.

Fábregas, who carried this action while wearing a t-shirt that read "No Borders", has been recognized for the transnational impact and orientation of his activism. Despite working from the U.S., his work was directed not only towards denouncing discriminatory policies there, but also towards ending similar situations in other places of the world, including those suffered by migrants. The ban on the entry of HIV-positive people in the U.S. was ultimately lifted in 2009.

== Legacy ==
The San Francisco AIDS Candlelight Vigil created the annual "Tomás Fábregas Award" in the framework of their AIDS Hero Awards, which recognize remarkable figures in the struggle against AIDS and are named after distinguished activists in the Bay Area.

In November 2008, the municipal "Coruña Visible" festival paid homage to Fábregas and the pioneers Elisa and Marcela. On February 7, 2011, the city council of A Coruña, his city of birth, approved to name a street after Fábregas, which was eventually opened in 2013. In 2019, several associations from A Coruña launched a series of informative sessions around HIV inspired by his figure, and 2021 saw the release of a documentary about him, titled Fighting Barriers and directed by Domingo Díaz.

The GLBT Historical Society of San Francisco preserves the archive of Fábregas' papers, consisting of six boxes of documents donated by his partner, Jeffrey L. Brooks.
