= Ken Hutcherson =

American football player and Christian pastor (1952–2013)

No. 59, 55
- Position: Linebacker

Personal information
- Born: July 14, 1952; Anniston, Alabama, U.S.
- Died: December 18, 2013 (aged 61); Redmond, Washington, U.S.
- Listed height: 6 ft 1 in (1.85 m)
- Listed weight: 220 lb (100 kg)

Career information
- High school: Anniston
- College: Livingston
- NFL draft: 1974: 4th round, 97th overall pick

Career history
- Dallas Cowboys (1974); San Diego Chargers (1975); Green Bay Packers (1975); Seattle Seahawks (1976)

Awards and highlights
- GSC Defensive Player of the Year (1972); 2× All-GSC (1972, 1973); NAIA All-American (1972); 2× All-Alabama Small College (1972, 1973)

Career NFL statistics
- Games played - started: 22 - 6
- Stats at Pro Football Reference

Kenneth Lee Hutcherson (July 14, 1952 – December 18, 2013) was an American professional football linebacker in the National Football League (NFL) and senior pastor at Antioch Bible Church in Kirkland, Washington, where he had been since 1985. His nickname from his NFL days was "the Hutch".

== Football career ==
=== College career ===
Hutcherson attended Anniston High School. He played linebacker for Livingston University (now the University of West Alabama) from 1970 to 1973. He was a starting outside linebacker for the Tigers' 1971 NAIA National Championship team, and was an All-American both his junior and senior seasons.

He was the NAIA National Player of the Week in 1972 when he made 21 tackles against Southern State. Hutcherson was named GSC Defensive Player of the Year in 1972, and was an All-GSC and All-Alabama Small College selection. In 1973, he led his team with 86 tackles.

In 1985, he was inducted into the West Alabama Tigers Athletics Hall of Fame.

=== Professional career ===
Hutcherson was selected in the fourth round (97th overall) of the 1974 NFL draft by the Dallas Cowboys, after dropping because he was seen as an undersized player. He tore cartilage in his knee during rookie orientation practices in the spring. He overcame the surgery to report on time to training camp. He was a backup outside linebacker and a standout on special teams. On September 9, 1975, he was traded to the San Diego Chargers in exchange for a seventh round draft choice (#186-Greg Schaum).

He was released by the Chargers after being hampered with a leg injury during the season and was claimed by the Green Bay Packers, who placed him immediately on the injured reserve list. The Seattle Seahawks selected him from the Packers roster in the 1976 NFL expansion draft. On September 7, 1976, he was placed on the injured reserve list with torn knee ligaments. The next year, he couldn't pass the Seahawks physical exam and left the team.

== Pastoral career ==
After ending his football career, Hutcherson conducted theological studies at Cascade Bible College in Bellevue, Washington in 1979. After finishing his studies, he served eight years as director of high school ministries at Westminster Chapel in Bellevue. In 1984, he started the multicultural Antioch Bible Church in Kirkland, Washington, along with Mark Webster and Dwight Englund. Hutcherson accepted the position of senior pastor in 1985 and was ordained in 1986.

Regarding the modern day Christian church, Hutcherson believed "the greatest need today in the church - which does not seem to be important in the average church - is the training of people in evangelism, discipleship and the responsibility they have for the church and responsibility they have for God."

In early 2010, Hutcherson shot a video for the I Am Second organization, in which he shared his testimony. In the video, Hutcherson talked about his experiences with racism growing up in the Deep South in the 1950s and 60s, and revealed that he grew to hate white people. The hatred, however, left him feeling empty and that's when he "ran into Jesus Christ."

Hutcherson and Rush Limbaugh were close friends, and the two spent a good amount of time together. Publicly, Hutcherson would often call in to The Rush Limbaugh Show around NFL playoff and Super Bowl time. He also officiated at Limbaugh's fourth wedding in June 2010. On his show of December 19, 2013, one day after Hutcherson's death, Limbaugh reflected on what Hutcherson meant to him and on the impact his death would have on others:

He was a man, folks. There was no complaining. There was no bleeding on people. There was none of that. He didn't want his relationship with anybody to be defined, even in what turned out to be the latter months of his life, by his illness. He was a devout Christian. He was a devout practicing Christian. And, as such, I don't think that he feared death because of that. But he's gone now, and it's a great, great loss for his congregation and his family because he's a unique individual. Nobody can be replaced when they're gone, but he's created an especially huge void for a lot of people because he was a counselor to people in trouble, no matter what the problem was.

Hutcherson also made frequent appearances on Glenn Beck's programs. On December 17, 2013, Beck posted a 10-minute video on his website, in which he talked at length about his relationship with Hutcherson. Beck tweeted the same day: "I just spoke to Hutch tonight. He is dying. He promised me that he will wait until I can get there Friday. Pray for his sweet wife and children." Hutcherson would die the next day.

Often a sparring partner of Hutcherson's, gay activist and The Stranger reporter Eli Sanders wrote a blog post one day after Hutcherson's death, entitled: "Ken Hutcherson's Last Goodbye (To Me)". In the post, Sanders revealed that Hutcherson had sent him a New Testament Bible in the mail in April 2011 and had embossed his name on the front. Inside, Hutcherson wrote: "Eli, now you can know what we are talking about! - Dr. Ken Hutcherson, Rom. 12:1-2". In the post, Sanders wrote, "I will miss him."

== Death ==
Hutcherson also told KVI host John Carlson in July 2012, "As a Christian, my perspective about living and dying is totally different from most. I believe in Christ, that he is sovereign; God is in control. And I believe the Bible, which tells me in Romans 8:28-30, there's nothing that comes to me that isn't for my best. There's nothing that can touch me that is not for my best. Everything that makes me more like Christ that comes into my life is for my best."

Hutcherson died on December 18, 2013.

== Opposition to homosexuality ==
=== Objections to homosexuality becoming a civil right ===
Hutcherson strongly objected to suggestions that opposition to discrimination based on sexual orientation bore a resemblance to the Civil Rights Movement in the 1960s.

On March 2, 2006, Hutcherson and King County Executive Ron Sims, himself a Baptist minister and a supporter of gay marriage, met at Seattle Town Hall to debate publicly the question "Is the gay rights movement the new civil rights movement?" The debate, sponsored by The Stranger, drew around 800 people.

On April 25, 2008, Hutcherson, along with approximately 100 other people, protested at Mount Si High School during the Day of Silence event. They intended upon encircling the school with "prayer warriors" and had invited a number of known hate groups to join in the protest bringing violent hate groups to a high school for political purposes.

=== Anti-discrimination legislation ===
Hutcherson was a vocal opponent of state anti-discrimination laws that were based on sexual orientation. On February 9, 2006, Tim Eyman lodged referendum Initiative 65, which sought a public vote to repeal the Murray Anderson Civil Rights Bill before it could take effect on June 7, 2006. Hutcherson supported the initiative and conducted petition signature gathering at his home church. When the June 6, 2006 deadline arrived, the campaign announced they had failed to collect the 112,400 signatures required to qualify for the ballot.

Hutcherson proceeded to lodge his own ballot initiative on January 19, 2007. Initiative 963 proposed removing any reference to sexual orientation from existing anti-discrimination legislation. The initiative required 224,800 valid signatures be collected by the July 6, 2007 deadline in order to qualify for the ballot. On January 27, 2007, The Seattle Times reported that Hutcherson had allied with a network of churches, including Watchmen on the Walls, that were tied to conservative evangelical Slavic communities in Washington State and California that had been active in opposing same-sex marriage.

On June 29, 2007, Hutcherson told The Seattle Times that he had dropped the initiative at the urging of Pastor Joe Fuiten, who argued that the time was not right for the campaign, and asked instead for his help in opposing domestic partnership rights for gay and lesbian couples.

==== Microsoft ====
In 2005, the Seattle weekly newspaper The Stranger reported that Hutcherson persuaded Microsoft to withdraw support for the Washington anti-discrimination bill that would have made it illegal to fire an employee due to their sexual orientation. Hutcherson had reportedly told the Microsoft general counsel that 700 evangelical Microsoft employees attend his church, and all of them opposed the bill. He added that if Microsoft did not withdraw support of the bill, he would organize a national boycott of the software maker. Sometime after the meeting, Microsoft changed its long-held position on the issue from support to neutral stating that anti-discrimination was not a priority for that legislative session.

A few weeks later, after protests from Microsoft employees and advocacy groups, Microsoft's gay, lesbian, bisexual and transgender employee resource group, the company reversed itself and pledged to support future anti-discrimination legislation.

The Anderson Murray Civil Rights Bill was passed in the Washington State House on January 20, 2006, in the Senate on January 27, 2006, and signed into law by Governor Christine Gregoire on January 31, 2006. When the bill was passed, Hutcherson again called for a boycott, but no such organized effort emerged.

On January 25, 2006, Hutcherson called for supporters to take action against Microsoft for reinstating its support of the Washington State Anti-Discrimination bill by driving down the company's stock price. Hutcherson asked that supporters purchase one or two Microsoft shares over the following months with the goal of selling them on May 1, 2006. Market experts stated that the "buy-and-dump" plan had no realistic chance of affecting Microsoft stock while legal scholars warned that the plan could be considered illegal market manipulation. Microsoft maintained its support of the bill and on May 1, 2006, Microsoft shares closed up 14 cents on the previous day's close.

On November 13, 2007, Hutcherson addressed the Microsoft Annual Stockholders meeting. During the question and answer session, he referred to previous discussions with Microsoft executives regarding their support for anti-discrimination legislation in Washington State and threatened further action against the company without clearly specifying the policy position or activity he hopes to change. Hutcherson half-jokingly stated "I could work with you, or I could be your worst nightmare, because I am a black man with a righteous cause, with a host of powerful white people behind me...".

After Hutcherson's comments, one attendee asked what shareholders could do to help the company to oppose Hutcherson. Microsoft General Counsel Brad Smith responded:

As a company, we've had a clear policy with respect to the way we treat our people, and we believe in that policy. It's a policy that's founded on non-discrimination, it's a policy that we believe has served our employees well, it's served our shareholders well, and I think that was reflected last year when all of our shareholders were asked to vote on that policy, and over 97 percent of you and all of our other shareholders stood up and agreed with us. And I think that it is precisely in that form that shareholders have the opportunity to continue to make their views known, and we very much appreciate that support.

On November 16, 2007, an interview appeared in The Daily Telegraph, a UK newspaper, where Hutcherson described his plan to ask millions of evangelical activists, Orthodox religious and other allies, to purchase Microsoft shares and demand a return to 'traditional values'. He described Microsoft as just the first company to be targeted in a larger campaign that would attempt to force American corporations to support only biblically-based social policy positions. In the article, Hutcherson alleged that there were "256 Fortune 500 companies alone pouring millions upon millions of dollars into pushing the homosexual agenda..." but he did not cite his source for the number.

In a January 12, 2008 radio interview on Sirius OutQ with Michelangelo Signorile, Hutcherson once again claimed that Microsoft was advocating in support of same-sex marriage.

On January 8, 2008, Hutcherson announced details of his "Buy Three, Donate One" campaign which asked supporters to purchase three shares of Microsoft stock, donate one share to the "AGN Financial Network," and prepare to vote on a Shareholder Proposal that would be presented at the next Microsoft Stockholders Annual meeting in November 2008.

=== Hate crimes legislation ===
On April 17, 2007, Hutcherson was scheduled to participate in a press conference hosted by Exodus International opposing passage of the federal Local Law Enforcement Hate Crimes Prevention Act of 2007. The event, to be held at the National Press Club, was intended to put pressure on lawmakers to drop the legislation which proposed adding sexual orientation and gender identity to the currently protected classes of race, color, religion and national origin. The press conference was cancelled in the wake of the Virginia Tech shooting. The Local Law Enforcement Hate Crimes Prevention Act of 2007 passed the House on May 3, 2007, by a vote of 237–180.

On June 18, 2007, Hutcherson and 29 other African-American pastors in the High Impact Leadership Coalition publicly opposed the Senate's hate crimes bill, then named the Matthew Shepard Hate Crimes Prevention Act, on 1st Amendment grounds.

=== Same-sex marriage ===
On May 1, 2004, Hutcherson organized a "Mayday for Marriage" rally against same-sex marriage. The highly publicized effort drew an estimated 20,000 supporters from around the Puget Sound region to Safeco Field in Seattle, Washington. Later, in October 2004, he organized another "Mayday for Marriage" rally in Washington, D.C.

- Hutcherson, Ken, "Here Comes the Bride : The Church: What We Are Meant to Be". 2000. ISBN 1-57673-359-9
- Hutcherson, Ken, "Before All Hell Breaks Loose : Preparing for the Coming Perilous Times", 2001 ISBN 1-57673-793-4
- Hutcherson, Ken, "Enough Faith: You've Already Got What It Takes to Make a Difference", 2006 ISBN 1-59052-600-7
- Hutcherson, Ken, "Hope Is Contagious: Trusting God in the Face of Any Obstacle". 2010 ISBN 978-0310327684
