= Speechless: Silencing the Christians =

- Genre: Christian documentary
- Presented by: Janet Parshall
- Country of origin: United States
- Original language: English
- No. of seasons: 1
- No. of episodes: 14 (13 + 1 special)

Production
- Producer: Dan Scalf
- Editor: Scott Zachry
- Running time: 30 minutes (series); 60 minutes (special)
- Production company: American Family Association

Original release
- Release: 2008

Speechless: Silencing the Christians (also known as Silencing Christians) is a 2008 documentary series produced by the American Family Association (AFA) and hosted by commentator Janet Parshall; the 13-episode series was first carried by the Inspiration Network. The documentary series describes the AFA's opposition to what it claims to be "political correctness", and claims that various factors, such as separation of church and state, hate crime laws, the Fairness Doctrine, and the "gay agenda", are threatening the existence of Christianity (though the Fairness Doctrine had not been enforced for 21 years at the time of broadcast and has continued to not be enforced up to present day). The DVD release featured an exclusive fourteenth episode.

The series was also edited into the form of a one-hour special in 2009, causing controversy for an airing on a Tampa, Florida television station.

== One-hour special ==
In 2009, the AFA released a one-hour special version of the program, which deals with their stance against what they call the "homosexual agenda", including interviews with ex-gay people. This special was produced mainly for commercial television stations under the purview of paid programming time, where the AFA purchases the airtime from the station in the same way as a regular infomercial broker would do. The special also served as a tie-in to the Donald Wildmon book of the same name, which was released in early 2009.

=== WFLA controversy ===
In the Tampa Bay television market, Media General's NBC affiliate WFLA-TV (channel 8) aired the special on June 27, 2009, on the same day that the annual St. Petersburg pride parade was held, on the weekend of the 40th anniversary of the Stonewall riots. Prior to the telecast, the station was swamped with numerous phone calls and e-mails against the station showing the program. After the program ended, the station logged hundreds of phone calls and over 1000 e-mails, all in protest against the show. General Manager Mike Pumo refused to elaborate on the decision, other than saying that the show's content did not "raise the red flag" during pre-screening. Stratton Pollitzer, deputy director of homosexual rights organization Equality Florida, considered the show hate speech, saying, "I think this program is a piece of homophobic propaganda and it has no place on a major network like NBC." NBC is merely the station's affiliated network, and holds no role in endorsing or being able to determine the station's content outside of network programming.

Brian Winfield, Equality Florida's director of communications, said the special "paints the entire gay community as being anti-Christian and that's just not true. On a day when tens of thousands of Tampa residents and their friends gathered together to celebrate diversity and pride, WFLA chose to profit from screening a show that was dehumanizing to gay people."

On July 15, 2009, reports ranging from about 70 to almost 100 protesters gathered outside of WFLA's studios to protest the airing of the special; the protesters carried red flags (in a reference to General Manager Pumo's remark), as well as signs that parodied the station's moniker, reading News Channel H8 (hate). John Schueler, a Media General executive responsible for WFLA, wrote in a prepared statement: "Our overriding mission is to provide platforms for the broadest points of view and be responsible to the community we serve. We understand that doing so can cause strong disagreement. We screened this program and ran a disclaimer before and after it ran noting that this does not reflect the views of WFLA." City of Tampa councilman John Dingfelder asked WFLA to apologize for carrying the program, saying that "This community wouldn't accept a racist infomercial, it wouldn't accept an anti-Semitic infomercial and we shouldn't accept a homophobic infomercial."

== See also ==
- Anti-Christian sentiment
- Christianity and homosexuality
- Save Our Children
- Homosexual agenda
- Homophobia
