= Parental Kidnapping Prevention Act =

1980 United States federal law

The Parental Kidnapping Prevention Act (PKPA; (Pub. L. 96–611, 94 Stat. 3573, enacted December 28, 1980; 28 U.S.C. § 1738A) is a United States law that establishes national standards for the assertion of child custody jurisdiction. The Act gives preference to the home state in which the child resided within the past six months for the purpose of preventing a child's parent from forum shopping, that is, initiating legal action in a different state for the purpose of obtaining a favorable court ruling. The goal of the Act was to increase uniformity in resolving interstate disputes involving jurisdiction over child custody. The Act's name represented its sponsors' concern that forum shopping was being used in cases of parental kidnapping in which one parent interferes with the custodial rights of another parent.

The PKPA provides that a state cannot modify the child custody decree of another state without complying with the terms of the PKPA. If a state modifies an earlier child custody order without doing so, states are not required to recognize the later order.

The enactment of the Defense of Marriage Act (DOMA) in 1996 created a conflict in the case of children of a legally married same-sex couple. A state that did not recognize same-sex marriage was required by PKPA to enforce child custody orders originating in a state that did, but DOMA allowed states to refuse to recognize.

When DOMA was declared unconstitutional and all U.S. states are required to recognize same-sex marriages as a matter of U.S. Constitutional law, in the case of Obergefell v. Hodges, 576 U.S. 644 (2015), however, this conflict ceased to be an issue. The federal Respect for Marriage Act (enacted December 13, 2022) further protected these rights and removed DOMA from the books, even in the event that the U.S. Supreme Court reverses the constitutional holding of Obergefell v. Hodges in some later case.
