= Leslie Katz (politician) =

American attorney and politician

Leslie Rachel Katz (born 1961) is an American attorney and former politician. She was a member of the San Francisco Board of Supervisors, president of the City College of San Francisco board of trustees and president of the Port of San Francisco commission.

== Career ==
Katz was elected San Francisco Democratic County Central Committee in 1988, and to the City College of San Francisco board of trustees in 1994. In 1996, Mayor Willie Brown appointed her to the San Francisco Board of Supervisors to fill the remainder of the term of Willie B. Kennedy who had retired from the board to join the Bay Area Rapid Transit (BART) board of directors. Katz was subsequently elected for a full four-year term. Katz described her position as "one of the few open lesbian elected officials in the country" a "daunting responsibility", and was initially known as the "Lesbian Supervisor."

In 2000, the election of supervisors was changed from at-large (i.e., citywide) elections to district elections and Katz chose not to run for re-election. In 2011 Mayor Gavin Newsom appointed Katz as a commissioner for the Port of San Francisco.

=== Equal Benefits Ordinance ===
During her tenure as a city supervisor, Katz co-authored the Equal Benefits Ordinance (EBO), which requires organizations that do business with the city to provide the same benefits (such as healthcare, retirement plans and paid time off) to employees' registered domestic partners as those provided to employees' spouses. The ordinance was opposed by the local branch of the Catholic church, whose charitable arm had contracts with the city. Katz, along with co-sponsors Susan Leal and Tom Ammiano, were able to obtain the support of the local Catholic archbishop by modifying the ordinance to allow employees to direct the benefits to any member of the employee's household, thus overcoming the church's objection to supporting same-sex couples. United Airlines, Federal Express and the Air Transport Association sued to block implementation of the ordinance, but the United States district court and the United States Court of Appeals for the Ninth Circuit upheld the new law. Many companies chose to apply the ordinance to all employees, not just those working in San Francisco. The EBO, although controversial at the time, became a model for similar legislation enacted by states and municipalities throughout the USA.

== Personal life ==
She is Jewish.

== See also ==
- American Family Ass'n v. City and County of San Francisco
