= Miller v. Jenkins =

Virginia court case about child custody

Miller v. Jenkins (previously called Miller-Jenkins v. Miller-Jenkins), 912 A.2d 951 (Vt. 2006), 637 S.E.2d 330 (Va. App. 2006), 661 S.E.2d 822 (Va. 2008), 678 S.E.2d 268 (Va. App. 2009), 12 A.3d 768 (Vt. 2010), cert. denied, 131 S.Ct. 568 (2010) is a series of related cases in the Virginia Supreme Court and the Vermont Supreme Court pertaining to child custody of Isabella Miller-Jenkins between former couple Lisa Miller and Janet Jenkins after they dissolved their civil union in Vermont. The protracted custody battle resulted in substantial media attention and an international parental kidnapping investigation after Miller failed to comply with court-ordered visitation for Jenkins.

== Background ==
In 2000, two women, Janet Jenkins and Lisa Miller of Rutland, Vermont, entered into a civil union in Vermont following the passage of civil union legislation earlier that year. Each changed her surname to Miller-Jenkins. In 2002, Lisa gave birth to a child conceived through artificial insemination, whom the couple named Isabella Miller-Jenkins. The couple separated in 2003, due to Miller accusing Jenkins of exposing Isabella to sexually explicit material, and possible sexual abuse. This triggered a protracted legal battle over the custody of Isabella.

Isabella Miller was 18 years old as of April 2020. In January, 2021, Lisa Miller turned herself in to the U.S. Embassy in Managua, Nicaragua, and was sent to the Federal Detention Center in Miami.

In February, 2021, Isabella Miller filed written and signed affidavits requesting legal removal from the 2012 civil lawsuit filed by Jenkins. In the documents, Isabella stated in her own words that she was and remains "happy, safe, healthy and[...]well cared for" who currently remains in Nicaragua of her own free will. She also stated that “[a]ll the attorneys who purport to represent me and my wishes are acting contrary to my wishes and desires and in (a) way to further a cause that is the exact opposite of what my desires and wishes as their client in fact are[.]"

== Vermont case ==
In the civil union dissolution proceedings, primary custody of Isabella was granted to Miller as Miller was her biological mother, while Jenkins was granted visitation rights. Miller subsequently moved to Virginia, which does not recognize civil unions, and denied attempts by Jenkins to visit Isabella. Miller further stated that she had become a Christian and was no longer a lesbian.

In February 2021, Isabella Miller, a legal adult since April 2020, filled papers requesting removal of her name from the Vermont case.

== Virginia case ==
In July 2004, Miller requested and received a court order in Virginia court declaring her Isabella's sole legal parent. Jenkins appealed in November, arguing on the basis of the Parental Kidnapping Prevention Act that the Virginia courts were obligated to comply with the rulings in Vermont family court. The Supreme Court of Virginia agreed and in November 2006 ordered that Jenkins be provided with visitation rights.

For the next three years, Miller consistently failed to comply with visitation orders and in November 2009, Judge William D. Cohen of Vermont ordered that sole custody of Isabella be given to Jenkins, with transportation occurring on January 1, 2010. Neither Miller nor Isabella appeared at the court-ordered time.

== Federal case ==
In 2010, Miller petitioned for a writ of certiorari from the United States Supreme Court. The Court declined to hear the case on November 8.

== Parental kidnapping investigation ==
In April 2011, the FBI arrested Timothy Miller, a Mennonite pastor of no relation to Lisa, and charged him with assisting with the international kidnapping of Isabella. The FBI alleged that Timothy had left a digital trail of himself and other Mennonite missionaries discussing Lisa's situation and her desire to flee the United States and that his mother-in-law's credit card was used to purchase tickets for Lisa and Isabella to fly to El Salvador and thereafter to Nicaragua, where Timothy and his wife had served as missionaries previously.

Timothy pleaded not guilty to the charges and requested that the charges be moved from the district court for Vermont to the district court for Western Virginia on the basis that this is where the alleged crime would have been committed. He also requested that his statements to investigators be excluded from the evidence as he was not read his Miranda rights.

In October of the same year, the FBI dropped its charges against Timothy as he began cooperating with the investigation.

In December, a Virginia pastor, Kenneth Miller (no relation to Lisa nor Timothy) was arrested and charged with aiding the kidnapping based on evidence obtained from Timothy. Jury selection began for that trial in August 2012.

Kenneth was found guilty on August 14, 2012 of aiding in international parental kidnapping of a minor, after jury deliberations lasting a few hours. He faced a sentence of up to three years. He was sentenced on March 4, 2013 to a term of 27 months imprisonment, with the sentence staying pending appeal. On December 16, 2015, the Second Circuit affirmed his conviction.

The day after Kenneth Miller was convicted, Jenkins filed a civil Racketeer Influenced and Corrupt Organizations Act suit against Lisa Miller, Kenneth Miller and several others who allegedly helped Lisa Miller flee the country. Among the defendants were various ministries founded by the late Jerry Falwell, including Thomas Road Baptist Church and Liberty University School of Law. On October 24, 2013, the United States District Court for the District of Vermont dismissed the RICO claims, but let stand claims for a conspiracy to commit an intentional tort of kidnapping and to deprive Janet of civil rights. The complaint was dismissed without prejudice as to some defendants because they had insufficient contact with Vermont. Order on motions to dismiss, docket entry 115, Case No. 2:12-cv-184 (U.S.D.C. Vt.)

== Related civil case ==
In 2012 Janet Jenkins filed a civil RICO suit, Jenkins v. Miller, against the same defendants and others in the federal district of Vermont, which was held up by the court's inability to serve defendant Lisa Miller, who remained in hiding in Nicaragua until January 2021. As the statute of limitations approached, Jenkins filed a duplicate suit in Virginia, which was dismissed by Judge Moon on the grounds of claim-splitting.

== Miller's surrender, arrest, charges, imprisonment and release ==
In January 2021, Lisa Miller voluntarily arrived to the US Embassy in Nicaragua and surrendered herself. Her daughter Isabella was an adult by the time and therefore was not bound by the case anymore; she allegedly received a temporary US passport.

In February 2021, Isabella Miller was still in Nicaragua, stating that she has been “happy, safe, healthy and I have been well cared for” since arriving in Nicaragua. She sought full removal from the legal case, which Jenkins' lawyers did not oppose.

In October 2021 Miller indicated to the court that her daughter was now living in Virginia near Charlottesville, working on a Mennonite farm.

In February 2022, Lisa Miller pleaded guilty to parental kidnapping. The charge typically carries a maximum sentence of three years and a plea agreement would have resulted in a prison term of 12 to 18 months. However, on May 24, 2022, Bedford County Judge Richard Acara agreed to release Miller under "time served" along with the right to appeal her sentence. The civil case filed by Jenkins remains open.

== Artistic portrayal ==
The case is the subject of the play She Said/She Said written by Rebecca Gingrich-Jones. Gingrich-Jones wrote the play as a project for her Master's Thesis at the Catholic University. Gingrich-Jones is the wife of former House Speaker Newt Gingrich's half-sister Candace Gingrich-Jones.
