= Stephen Prothero =

American scholar of religion (born 1960)

- Born: November 13, 1960 (age 65); Cooperstown, New York, U.S.
- Occupation: Religious studies scholar
- Spouse: Meera Subramanian

Academic background
- Education: Yale University; Harvard University
- Thesis: Henry Steel Olcott (1832–1907) and the construction of "Protestant Buddhism" (1990)
- Doctoral advisor: William R. Hutchison

Academic work
- Discipline: Comparative religion; U.S. religious history
- Website: www.stephenprothero.com

Stephen Richard Prothero (/ˈproʊðəroʊ/; born November 13, 1960) is an American scholar of religion. He is the C. Allyn and Elizabeth V. Russell Professor Emeritus of Religion in America at Boston University and the author or editor of eleven books on religion in the United States and comparative religions, including the New York Times bestseller Religious Literacy.

Prothero has argued for mandatory public-school biblical literacy courses (along the lines of the Bible Literacy Project's The Bible and Its Influence), along with mandatory courses on world religions. He delivered the William Belden Noble Lectures at Harvard University on November 18–20, 2008, on the topic: “The Work of Doing Nothing: Wandering as Practice and Play." On the matter of his own personal beliefs, Prothero describes himself as "religiously confused".

== Early life and education ==
Prothero was born in Cooperstown, New York, on 13 November 1960, the son of "Dr. and Mrs. S. Richard Prothero". He was the valedictorian of his Barnstable High School class in Hyannis, Massachusetts, in June 1978. In June 1982 he received his B.A. in American Studies from Yale College, summa cum laude and with distinction. In 1986 he received his M.A. in Study of Religion at Harvard University. On 25 April 1990 he completed his Ph.D. there on Henry Steel Olcott (1832–1907) and the construction of "Protestant Buddhism." His supervisor was Professor William R. Hutchison.

== Books ==
- God the Bestseller: How One Editor Transformed American Religion a Book at a Time (2023, ISBN 978-0-06-246404-0)
- Religion Matters: An Introduction to the World's Religions (2d ed., 2024, ISBN 978-1-32-406214-1)
- Religion Matters: An Introduction to the World's Religions (2020, ISBN 978-0-39-342204-7)
- Why Liberals Win The Culture Wars (Even When They Lose Elections) (2016, ISBN 978-0-06-157129-9)
- The American Bible: How Our Words Unite, Divide, and Define a Nation (2012, ISBN 978-0-06-212343-5)
- God Is Not One: The Eight Rival Religions That Run the World—and Why Their Differences Matter (2010, ISBN 978-0-06-157127-5)
- Religious Literacy: What Every American Needs to Know—and Doesn't (2007, ISBN 0-06-084670-4)
- A Nation of Religions: The Politics of Pluralism in Multireligious America (2006, ISBN 0-8078-5770-X)
- American Jesus: How the Son of God Became a National Icon (2003, ISBN 0-374-52956-6)
- Purified by Fire: A History of Cremation in America (2001, ISBN 0-520-23688-2)
- Asian Religions in America: A Documentary History, co-edited with Thomas A. Tweed (1998, ISBN 978-0-19-511339-6)
- The White Buddhist: The Asian Odyssey of Henry Steel Olcott (1996, ISBN 0-520-23688-2)
