= Social conservatism =

Political ideology advocating traditional values and power structures

Looking Backward (1912) by Laura E. Foster. An American anti-suffrage cartoon suggesting that women are happiest focusing on their home and family.

Social conservatism is a political philosophy and a variety of conservatism that places emphasis on conserving the traditional moral values of society, frequently sourced from a religion. It also aims to preserve traditional social structures over social pluralism. Social conservatives organize in favor of duty, traditional values, and social institutions, such as traditional family structures, gender roles, sexual relations, national patriotism, and religious traditions. Social conservatism is usually skeptical of social change, instead tending to support the status quo concerning social issues.

Social conservatives also value the rights of religious institutions to participate in the public sphere, thus often supporting government-religious endorsement and opposing state atheism, and in some cases opposing secularism.

Social conservatism, as a movement, is largely an outgrowth of traditionalist conservatism. The key difference is that traditional conservatism is broader and includes philosophical considerations, whereas social conservatism is largely focused on just moralism.

== Social conservatism and other ideological views ==
There is overlap between social conservatism and paleoconservatism, in that they both support and value traditional social forms.

Social conservatism is not to be confused with economically interventionist conservatism, where conservative ideas are combined with Keynesian economics and a welfare state as practised by some European conservatives (e.g. one-nation conservatives in the United Kingdom, Gaullists in France). Some social conservatives support free trade and laissez faire market approaches to economic and fiscal issues, but social conservatives may also support economic intervention where the intervention serves moral or cultural aims. Historian Jon Wiener has described social conservatism as historically the result of an appeal from "elitist preservationists" to working class citizens to 'protect' wealth from immigration.

Many social conservatives support a balance between protectionism and a free market. This concern for material welfare, like advocacy of traditional mores, will often have a basis in religion. Examples include the Christian Social Union of Bavaria, the Family First Party and Katter's Australian Party, and the communitarian movement in the United States.

== Social conservatism by country ==
=== Australia ===
Mainstream conservatism in Australia generally incorporates liberalism, hence liberal conservatism being the primary ideology of the major centre-right coalition in Australia, the Liberal-National Coalition. Therefore, the Coalition, while having members with some socially conservative views, is not considered socially conservative. However, both social conservatism and right-wing populism are present among right-wing minor parties, such as Pauline Hanson's One Nation, the United Australia Party (UAP) and Katter's Australian Party (KAP) amongst others.

Nevertheless, the National Right (also known as the "Conservative" faction or the "Right" faction) serves as the party's social conservative faction, although the party is still considered a broad church conservative party and factions do collaborate with each other; for example, the New South Wales Liberal Party often chooses a leadership team consisting of both a member of the more centrist Moderate faction and a member of the Right.

Social conservatives in Australia often need to take a broad church stance while governing. For example, former New South Wales Liberal Party leader and state premier, Dominic Perrottet, a conservative Catholic, despite having voted against legalising same-sex marriage in 2018 and opposing abortion, followed Labor leader Chris Minns' in supporting a 2023 state-wide ban on gay conversion therapy, whilst also vowing to protect religious freedom and preaching.

During the Australian Marriage Law Postal Survey of 2018, which successfully sought to legalise same-sex marriage in Australia, the Coalition government led by Prime Minister Malcolm Turnbull allowed its members a conscience vote on the issue. While many (including Turnbull) were in favour, some were opposed, but supported holding a plebiscite on the matter. Federal Coalition MPs who opposed same-sex marriage during the debate included former Prime Minister Tony Abbott, Peter Dutton, Scott Morrison and many others. However, when the plebiscite was successful (with 61.6% in favour), a vote needed to be held in both chambers of Parliament. The Marriage Amendment (Definition and Religious Freedoms) Act 2017 was tabled in the Senate and was subsequently passed in the House of Representatives, with just three votes against (excluding the members who abstained). Due to their respective electorates delivering a majority "yes" vote (as well as the entire country), members such as Dutton (who voted "no" in the plebiscite) voted in favour of the bill after his seat of Dickson voted 65.16% in favour.

=== Canada ===
In Canada, social conservatism, though widespread, is not as prominent in the public sphere as in the United States. It is prevalent in all areas of the country but is seen as being more prominent in rural areas. It is also a significant influence on the ideological and political culture of the western provinces of Manitoba, Saskatchewan, Alberta, and British Columbia.

Compared to social conservatism in the United States, social conservatism has not been as influential in Canada. The main reason is that the neoconservative style of politics as promoted by leaders such as former Prime Ministers such as Paul Martin and Stephen Harper have focused on fiscal conservatism, with little or no emphasis on moral or social conservatism. Without a specific, large political party behind them, social conservatives have divided their votes and can be found in all political parties.

Social conservatives often felt that they were being sidelined by officials in the Progressive Conservative Party of Canada and its leadership of so-called "Red Tories" for the last half of the twentieth century and therefore many eventually made their political home with parties such as the Social Credit Party of Canada and the Reform Party of Canada. Despite the Reform Party being dominated by social conservatives, leader Preston Manning, seeking greater national support for the party, was reluctant for the party to wholly embrace socially conservative values. This led to his deposition as leader of the party (now called Canadian Alliance) in favor of social conservative Stockwell Day. The party's successor, the Conservative Party of Canada, despite having a number of socially conservative members and cabinet ministers, has chosen so far not to focus on socially conservative issues in its platform. This was most recently exemplified on two occasions in 2012 when the current Conservative Party of Canada declared they had no intention to repeal same-sex marriage or abortion laws.

=== China ===
Chiang Kai-shek, a former president of Republic of China, could be seen as a social conservative who was critical of liberal values and defended the union of Confucian traditions and modernism. Under his rule, the Kuomintang led the New Life Movement.

After the Chinese Communist Revolution, social conservatism in China increased due to the rise of New Confucianism and others after the 1970s to 1980s during the reform and opening up.

In 2024, Bloomberg News described the period of China, where Xi Jinping is president, as a "Conservative Era"; Faced with a shrinking population, China's most powerful leader since Mao Zedong has urged women to cultivate a “culture” of childbirth and take on a more domestic role. CCP general secretary Xi has adopted a more conservative social view since he began his third leadership in 2022. He reflects traditional and patriarchal views of women in speeches and policies. This is partially related to the issue of China's low birth rate. Since 2020, the Chinese Communist Party has accelerated its crackdown on LGBTQ+ activism. Several journalists and scholars have described new Confucianism and conservative nationalism as the key features of China under Xi Jinping's leadership. In 2026, the Cyberspace Administration of China launched a campaign directing Chinese social media platforms to censor content that "promotes not marrying and not having children" or that "provokes gender antagonism", a move that has been criticized for its traditionalist and anti-feminist intent.

=== Islamic world ===
Due to their interpretation of Islamic law also known as Shariah, they have some differences from social conservatism as understood in the nations of West Europe, North America and Oceania.

==== Arab world ====
The Arab world has recently been more conservative in social and moral issues owing to the Arab spring. An example of a socially conservative party is the Justice and Development Party of Morocco.

==== Pakistan ====
Muttahida Majlis-e-Amal is an alliance of socially conservative and Islamist political parties in Pakistan.

=== India ===
==== Hindu social conservatism ====
Hindu social conservatism in India in the twenty first century has developed into an influential movement, represented in the political arena by the right-wing Bharatiya Janata Party. Hindu social conservatism, also known as the Hindutva movement, is spearheaded by the voluntary non-governmental organization Rashtriya Swayamsevak Sangh. The core philosophy of this ideology is nativism, and it sees Hinduism as a national identity, rather than a religious one. Due to an inclination towards nativism, much of its platform is based on the belief that Islamic and Christian denominations in India are the result of occupations, and, therefore, these groups should be uprooted from the Indian subcontinent by converting their members back to Hinduism.

In terms of political positions, Hindu social conservatives in India seek to institutionalize a Uniform Civil Code (which is also a directive under Article 44 of the Constitution of India) for members of all religions, over the current scheme of different personal laws for different religions. For instance, polygamy is legal for Muslims in India, but not Hindus.

==== Muslim social conservatism ====
There are several socially conservative Muslim organisations in India, ranging from groups such as the Indian Union Muslim League which aim to promote the preservation of Indian Muslim culture as a part of the nation's identity and history.

=== South Africa ===
Social conservatism had an important place in Apartheid South Africa ruled by the National Party. Pornography, gambling, and other activities that were deemed undesirable were severely restricted. The majority of businesses were forbidden from doing business on Sunday.

=== United States ===
Social conservatism in the United States is a right-wing political ideology that opposes social progressivism. It is centered on the preservation of what adherents often call 'traditional' or 'family values', though the accepted aims of the movement often vary amongst the organisations it comprises, making it hard to generalise about ideological preferences. There are, however, a number of general principles to which at least a majority of social conservatives adhere, such as opposition to abortion and opposition to same-sex marriage. Sociologist Harry F. Dahms suggests that Christian doctrinal conservatives (anti-abortion, anti-same-sex marriage) and gun-use conservatives (such as supporters and members of the National Rifle Association of America) form two domains of ideology within American social conservatism.

The Republican Party is the largest United States political party with socially conservative ideals incorporated into its platform. Other socially conservative parties include the American Solidarity Party, and the Constitution Party.

Social conservatives are strongest in the South, where they are a mainstream political force with aspirations to translate those ideals using the party platform nationally. Supporters of social conservatism played a major role in the political coalitions of Ronald Reagan and George W. Bush.

=== Other areas ===
There are also social conservative movements in many other parts of the world, such as Latin America, Eastern Europe, the Balkans, the Caucasus, Central Europe, Mediterranean countries, Southeast Asia, and Oceania.

== Examples of social conservative political parties ==
=== Argentina ===
- La Libertad Avanza

=== Armenia ===
- Conservative Party
- Constitutional Rights Union
- For Social Justice
- National Christian Party
- National Democratic Alliance
- Pan-Armenian National Agreement
- Prosperous Armenia
- Republican Party of Armenia

=== Australia ===
- Liberal Party of Australia (factions)
- National Party of Australia (factions)
- Family First Party
- Democratic Labour Party
- Katter's Australian Party
- Pauline Hanson's One Nation
- Shooters, Fishers and Farmers Party
- United Australia Party

=== Austria ===
- Freedom Party of Austria
- Austrian People's Party
- Christian Party of Austria

=== Belgium ===
- New-Flemish Alliance
- Vlaams Belang

=== Bosnia and Herzegovina ===
- Alliance of Independent Social Democrats

=== Brazil ===
- Brazilian Labour Renewal Party
- Brazilian Woman's Party
- Christian Democracy
- Liberal Party
- Republicans

=== Bulgaria ===
- GERB
- IMRO – Bulgarian National Movement
- Bulgarian Socialist Party (factions)

=== Cambodia ===
- Cambodian People's Party

=== Canada ===
- Conservative Party of Canada (factions)
- Christian Heritage Party of Canada
- People's Party of Canada (factions)
- United Conservative Party (Alberta)

=== China ===
- Chinese Communist Party (factions)

=== Chile ===
- Christian Social Party (PDC)
- Chilean Republican Party (PLR)
- Independent Democratic Union (UDI)

=== Czech Republic ===
- Freedom and Direct Democracy
- KDU-ČSL

=== Denmark ===
- Danish People's Party

=== El Salvador ===
- Nuevas Ideas
- Nationalist Republican Alliance

=== Estonia ===
- Conservative People's Party
- Isamaa

=== Faroe Islands ===
- Centre Party

=== Fiji ===
- Social Democratic Liberal Party

=== Finland ===
- Finns Party
- Christian Democrats

=== France ===
- Movement for France
- National Rally
- VIA, the Way of the People

=== Germany ===
- Christian Democratic Union of Germany
- Alternative for Germany
- Family Party of Germany
- Alliance C – Christians for Germany
- Bündnis Sahra Wagenknecht

=== Georgia ===
- Georgian Dream
- Alliance of Patriots of Georgia

=== Greece ===
- New Democracy (factions)
- Greek Solution
- Independent Greeks

=== Hungary ===
- Fidesz
- Christian Democratic People's Party
- Our Homeland Movement
- Jobbik
- Tisza Party

=== India ===
- Bharatiya Janata Party
- All India Majlis-e-Ittehadul Muslimeen
- Shiv Sena
- Maharashtra Navnirman Sena
- National People's Party

=== Ireland ===
- Aontú
- Fianna Fáil
- Fine Gael
- National Party
- Renua

=== Israel ===
- Noam
- Shas
- Agudat Yisrael
- Degel HaTorah
- United Torah Judaism
- Religious Zionist Party
- Otzma Yehudit
- Yachad
- United Arab List

=== Italy ===
- Forza Italia
- Fratelli d'Italia
- Lega Nord
- The People of the Family (Il Popolo della Famiglia)
- Christian Italy (Italia Cristiana)
- Union of the Centre

=== Japan ===
- Liberal Democratic Party
- Komeito

=== Luxembourg ===
- Alternative Democratic Reform Party
- Déi Konservativ

=== Mexico ===
- National Action Party
- Institutional Revolutionary Party
- Social Encounter Party

=== Moldova ===
- Party of Socialists of the Republic of Moldova (factions)
- Our Party
- Party of Communists of the Republic of Moldova (factions)

=== Netherlands ===
- Christian Union
- Reformed Political Party (SGP)
- Denk

=== New Zealand ===
- National Party (factions)
- New Conservative Party
- New Zealand First

=== Norway ===
- Christian Democratic Party
- Conservative

=== Philippines ===
- National Unity Party
- Nationalist People's Coalition

=== Poland ===
- Law and Justice
- United Poland
- The Republicans
- Polish People's Party
- Confederation Liberty and Independence

=== Portugal ===
- Chega

=== Romania ===
- Social Democratic Party
- National Liberal Party
- People's Movement Party
- Alliance for the Union of Romanians
- Ecologist Party of Romania
- Democratic Alliance of Hungarians in Romania

=== Russia ===
- United Russia
- CPRF
- LDPR
- A Just Russia

=== Slovakia ===
- Direction – Social Democracy
- Christian Democratic Movement
- Slovak National Party
- Slovakia
- Christian Union
- We Are Family
- Republic
- People's Party Our Slovakia

=== Spain ===
- Spanish Alternative
- Vox

=== Serbia ===
- Serbian Radical Party
- Dveri
- Healthy Serbia
- Better Serbia
- Democratic Party of Serbia
- People's Freedom Movement
- Serbian Party Oathkeepers
- Serbian Right

=== Sweden ===
- Sweden Democrats
- Christian Democrats
- Alternative for Sweden

=== Switzerland ===
- Swiss People's Party
- Federal Democratic Union of Switzerland
- Evangelical People's Party of Switzerland

=== Tanzania ===
- Chama Cha Mapinduzi

=== Turkey ===
- Justice and Development Party
- Felicity Party
- Great Unity Party

=== Ukraine ===
- European Solidarity
- Batkivshchyna

=== United Kingdom ===
- Reform UK
- Conservative Party (factions)
- Heritage Party
- UK Independence Party
- Social Democratic Party
- Workers Party of Britain
- Scottish Family Party

==== Northern Ireland ====
- Democratic Unionist Party
- Traditional Unionist Voice
- Ulster Unionist Party
- Aontú

=== United States ===
- Republican Party (factions)
- Constitution Party
- American Solidarity Party
- Christian Liberty Party
- Alaskan Independence Party
- American Independent Party
- American Communist Party (2024)

== Social conservative factions of political parties ==
=== Australia ===
- National Right (Liberal Party of Australia)

=== United Kingdom ===
- Blue Labour (Labour Party)
- Cornerstone Group, New Conservatives (Conservative Party)

=== United States ===
- Blue Dog Coalition (Democratic Party)
- Mises Caucus (Libertarian Party)
- Republican Study Committee, Freedom Caucus (Republican Party)

== See also ==
- Christian right
- Social inertia: the prevention of social change
- Social liberalism
- Victorian morality
- High Tory
- Paleoconservatism
- Traditionalist conservatism
- Social conservatism in Canada
- Social conservatism in the United States
- Anti-abortion movement
- Family values
- List of economic left and socially conservative political parties

== Bibliography ==
- Heywood, Andrew (2017). Political Ideologies: An Introduction. Palgrave Macmillan. ISBN 978-1-137-60604-4.
