= National Council on Bible Curriculum in Public Schools =

Conservative nonprofit organization

The National Council on Bible Curriculum in Public Schools (NCBCPS) is a conservative nonprofit organization that promotes the use of its 300-page Bible curriculum, The Bible in History and Literature, in public schools throughout the United States.

The NCBCPS was founded in 1993, and promoted its curriculum in many school districts throughout the country.

The NCBCPS' proposed curriculum has been critiqued by scholars as "neither academically nor constitutionally sound" and an attempt to promote a single religious view of the Bible. The use of the curriculum has been challenged in lawsuits in two school districts, which have withdrawn the course as contravening the Establishment Clause of the First Amendment.

== Establishment of organization and overview of curriculum ==
NCBCPS was founded on April 8, 1993, by Elizabeth Ridenhour, a Greensboro, North Carolina paralegal. The organization's annual 990 tax forms, available on Guidestar.org, list Ridenhour as an ordained minister. NCBCPS contends that "the Bible was the foundation and blueprint for our Constitution, Declaration of Independence, our educational system, and our entire history until the last 20 or 30 years." Dr. Mark A. Chancey of Southern Methodist University, a Bible scholar, writes that the organization is a "promotion of a fundamentalist Protestant understanding of the Bible and a revisionist history of the United States as a distinctively (Protestant) Christian nation, the curriculum appears not to pass legal muster." Purportedly, it is based on a course previously taught in Charlotte-Mecklenburg Schools.

A 2006 report, Reading, Writing and Religion: Teaching the Bible in Texas Public Schools, Chancey found that "the number of Texas school districts using the NCBCPS curriculum, 11, is less than a fourth of the 52 claimed by the NCBCPS itself. Adding the very few school districts known to have used the course in the past ... does not significantly change the total number. The NCBCPS markets its course by strongly emphasizing the large number of school districts that supposedly teach it; as of late July 2006, its Web site claimed that its curriculum is currently offered in 362 districts nationwide. Such oft-repeated claims now appear to be quite inaccurate. If the situation in Texas is representative, the curriculum is probably actually taught in only a few dozen districts."

Chancey writes that the NCBCPS's sectarian curriculum promotes an "obvious bias toward a view of the Bible held by fundamentalist Protestants" and teaches interpretation and perspectives of biblical scripture that are "simply not shared by many mainline Protestants, Roman Catholics, Eastern Orthodox Christians and Jews or within the scholarly community." The curriculum promotes a literal interpretation of the Genesis creation narrative; a Christian interpretation of the Hebrew Bible (Old Testament) that contends that certain passages are messianic prophecies of Jesus; the idea that Christianity supersedes Judaism; and a belief in the imminency of the Second Coming.

== Legal challenges to curriculum ==
Two school boards have been sued for adopting the NCBCPS materials in their district:

=== Moreno v. Ector County School Board ===
A federal lawsuit on behalf of eight parents in Odessa, Texas, was filed in 2007 against the Ector County school board. The suit was brought by the ACLU of Texas, the People For the American Way Foundation and the law firm of Jenner & Block. The suit alleged that the course promotes certain religious beliefs to the exclusion of others. The Ector County School Board was represented by Liberty Legal Foundation.

In March 2008, the lawsuit was settled after Ector County School Board agreed to cease teaching NCBCPS materials in its schools after that current school year. The course offered, introduced to the county in 2005, had been taught as an elective in two high schools in Odessa. Bible scholars, as well as the ACLU, had critiqued the course as inaccurate and lacking a scholarly basis, promoting a specific Protestant religious interpretation of the Bible at odds with the views held by Jews, Catholics, Orthodox Christians, and most Protestants. The ACLU also criticized the court for promoting an "unbalanced view of American history that promoted specific religious beliefs that is in conflict with objective scholarly standards."

According to the settlement, any Bible course Ector County schools offer in the future cannot be based on the NCBCPS curriculum, and that any course about the Bible taught in the county's public schools had to have an objective and balanced, rather than sectarian, curriculum. One of the plaintiffs, an ordained elder and deacon at a local Presbyterian Church, said that it was inappropriate for one set of religious beliefs to be promoted over others, and that "It seems as though a church had invaded the public school system – and it wasn't my church." Announcing the settlement, the ACLU's Director of Litigation said in a press release that "We trust that any future curriculum will be appropriate for students of all faiths – including nonbelievers – and that it will respect the religious liberty of all Odessans."

=== Gibson v. Lee County School Board ===
The Lee County School Board (Florida) was sued for its use of NCBCPS curriculum. The school district adopted the "Bible History I" curriculum dispute a warning from its attorney that the course had a biased title; appeared "to teach the Bible 'as an inerrant document'"; had an apparently non-secular purpose; and taught a "single Protestant perspective." In a January 1998 decision, a federal court issued a preliminary injunction that prohibited the teaching of the "New Testament" curriculum, which it found likely unconstitutional, and allowed the teaching of the "Old Testament" curriculum under certain conditions. (The Old Testament class curriculum had been modified at the suggestion of the plaintiffs to remove potentially unconstitutional content.) In February 1998, the school district settled the lawsuit by agreeing to end the teaching of the classes (which had been offered in seven high schools) and to pay the plaintiffs' attorney fees.

=== Other legal analyses ===
In a 2007 article published in Baylor Law Review, Amanda Colleen Brown reviewed the NCBCPS' The Bible in History and Literature and the Bible Literacy Project's The Bible and Its Influence. The author found that, under the three legal tests used by the Supreme Court to determine the legality of Bible courses, the NCBCPS curriculum was "unfit for use in public school classrooms," while the Bible Literacy Project's curriculum "comports with constitutional standards, thus making it a viable alternative to the NCBCPS curriculum." Brown argues that a key problem with the NCBCPS curriculum is that it consists of only a teacher's guide, with no student textbook. Brown writes:

Using only the Bible makes compliance with the Constitution and regulating the classroom instruction much more difficult. If there is a text to follow, then the majority of what will be discussed in class can be scrutinized and approved or disapproved. It also provides a guide by implication for teachers as to the tone and content of course lessons. Using only the Bible makes inadvertent or intentional Constitutional violations much more likely, since the class content is predominantly lectures by the teacher. Given that the curriculum has a sectarian nature and promotes religious viewpoints, the fact that the Bible serves as the only text makes the effect of the advancement of religion even more likely. It is possible, as well, that the NCBCPS intentionally chose not to develop a text, in order to give the teachers more freedom to control the content of the course toward the views expressed by the NCBCPS in the curriculum.

In 1999, Attorney General of Georgia Thurbert Baker issued an opinion on the state's proposed adoption of the NCBCPS courses. Baker wrote that the teaching of the classes might not survive legal challenge under the First Amendment's Establishment Clause. Baker noted that, under the Supreme Court's decisions in Lemon v. Kurtzman (1971), Bible courses in public schools "may survive First Amendment scrutiny only if their content is determined to be secular and they are taught in a secular, objective manner." Baker added that "with respect to the State constitution, the use of public funds to teach the Bible courses in question may be held to constitute 'aid' to a particular religion, i.e., Christianity, if appropriate instruction regarding other religions is not included or if the instruction is not offered in a neutral and objective manner."

== Reception of curriculum ==
=== Support ===
The syllabus of the National Council on Bible Curriculum in Public Schools has endorsed by D. James Kennedy, Bill Bright, Joyce Meyer, Jerry Falwell, John Hagee, T.D. Jakes, Dale Evans Rogers, Jane Russell, Pat Boone, Carman Licciardello, and Scott O'Grady.

=== Criticism ===
The NCBCPS' proposed curriculum has been critiqued by scholars as "neither academically nor constitutionally sound" and an attempt to promote a single religious view of the Bible. On August 1, 2005, Dr. Mark Chancey, professor of Biblical studies at Southern Methodist University, released a report through the Texas Freedom Network detailing his concerns about the scholarly quality of the curriculum. Chancey stated that the curriculum was improperly sectarian, and contained "shoddy research, factual errors and plagiarism." In particular, Chancey wrote that the curriculum "uses a discredited urban legend that NASA has evidence that two days are missing in time, thus 'confirming' a biblical passage about the sun standing still [pp. 116–17];" and that more than one-third of the curriculum's 300 pages are reproduced word-for-word from uncredited sources such as Microsoft's Encarta encyclopedia. Hundreds of Biblical scholars at universities around the United States have signed on as endorsers of Chancey's findings. The NCBCPS responded with a press release describing the Texas Freedom Network as "a small group of far left, anti-religion extremists ... desperate to ban" the Bible from public schools.

In a subsequent article, Dr. Chancey wrote:

As early as August 12, however, the NCBCPS was mailing school districts a revised edition of its curriculum, along with a letter urging them in bold, italicized, underlined letters to 'please discard any previous editions of the curriculum that you may have.' ... Why a purportedly problem-free book that had been published only five months earlier needed to be completely replaced was not explained.

Robert Marus of the Associated Baptist Press Washington Bureau wrote that the revision of the curriculum "incorporat[ed] many of the changes recommended by an organization [the NCBCPS] characterized as 'anti-religion extremists.'"

Writing in 2007, Chancey wrote that the NCBCPS's revised (2005) curriculum's was "an improvement" but was "still maintains a historicizing perspective that strongly reflects conservative Protestant views". Chancey found that all versions of the curriculum failed the legal test of Lemon v. Kurtzman, 403 U.S. 602 (1971), in which the Supreme Court ruled that public education in religious matters" (1) must have a "secular purpose;" (2) must have a "principal or primary effect that neither advances nor inhibits religion;" (3) "must not foster 'an excessive government entanglement with religion.'" Chancey found that the curriculum, even as revised, had the likely effect of advancing the interest of particular religious groups.

In a 2007 article in Time magazine, David Van Biema wrote that the NCBCPS curriculum is not "legally palatable ... Its spokespeople claim it is refining itself as it goes and its most recent edition, which came out last month, eliminates much literalist bias—but still devotes 18 lines to the blatantly unscientific notion that the earth is only 6,000 years old." Van Biema praised the nonprofit Bible Literacy Project's The Bible and Its Influence curriculum as a good model for public school Bible electives. Similarly, in a 2007 editorial, the Chicago Tribune criticized the NCBCPS—citing the organization's "fundamentalist Protestant interpretation of the Bible that often ignores the differing beliefs and practices of Catholics, Jews, Eastern Orthodox Christians and mainline Protestants" and its "sloppy editing, factual errors and outright copying, word for word, from sources"—and praised the Bible Literacy Project's curriculum as an alternative that was "vetted, accepted and praised by a wide range of scholars, critics and education officials."

== See also ==
- Abington School District v. Schempp
- Accommodationism
- The Bible and Its Influence
- Christian right
