= Christian Liberty Party =

American minor third political party

- Abbreviation: CLP
- Founded: 2000; 26 years ago
- Split from: Constitution Party
- Ideology: Christian right Christian nationalism Social conservatism
- Political position: Right-wing

Website
- christianlibertyparty.org

The Christian Liberty Party (CLP) is a minor political party in the United States whose platform advocates social conservatism. Its platform positions include the opposition to abortion, as well as opposition to property taxes; it advocates "an educational system that respects individual freedom of conscience and reinforces the Biblical role and responsibility of the family as the educator of youth". Ideologically, the Christian Liberty Party is aligned with the Christian right and Christian nationalism, viewing the United States as a Christian state and seeing "the Bible as a blueprint for political action".

== History ==
The Christian Liberty Party was founded in June 2000 as the American Heritage Party after a group of members left the Constitution Party. The reason for the establishment of the Christian Liberty Party was because the Constitution Party did not explicitly identify itself as a Christian party. To this end, the Christian Liberty Party is "a political party that adopts the Bible as its political textbook and is unashamed to be explicitly Christian ... [and] whose principles are drawn from Scripture."

== Platform ==
=== Current platform ===
The current platform is available on the Christian Liberty Party's official website. It currently has 7 planks.

=== Platform topics ===
The current platform has not been edited since 2010. The preamble states "If to please the people, we offer what we ourselves disapprove, how can we afterward defend our work? Let us raise a standard to which the wise and the honest can repair; the event is in the hand of God!" - George Washington and acknowledges "In so doing we acknowledge the God of the Bible as the Supreme Judge, Lawgiver and King and the first cause of all existence. Consequently, the principles and the platform of our party are rightly derived from Biblical presuppositions. We acknowledge the legacy of our Founding Fathers who believed that "a frequent recurrence to fundamental principles" is essential to securing liberty and good government."

==== Social policy ====
The Christian Liberty Party opposes abortion and euthanasia as cited in their platform saying "We support legislation to prohibit all acts of abortion and infanticide" and "We oppose laws that condone or legalize euthanasia or so-called "mercy killing."

The party supports the right to bear arms in accordance with the Second Amendment.

The party opposes pornography, stating "Therefore we support laws making it a criminal offense to distribute or display pornography."

==== Fiscal policy ====
The party opposes the Federal Reserve and "support a return to the monetary and banking provisions set forth in the Constitution and the abolition of the Federal Reserve System."

== Campaigns ==
Under its old name of the American Heritage Party it ran candidates for local positions in 2000 and 2002 in the state of Washington.

== See also ==
- Accommodationism
- Christian amendment
- Foundation for Moral Law
- Lord's Day Observance Society
- National Reform Association
