= Social conservatism in the United States =

Impact of the political ideology

Social conservatism in the United States is a political ideology focused on the preservation of traditional values and beliefs. It focuses on a concern with moral and social values which proponents of the ideology see as degraded in modern society by liberalism. In the United States, one of the largest forces of social conservatism is the Christian right.

Social conservatives in the United States generally take fundamentalist, familialist, moralist stances on social issues. This is exemplified by their opposition to abortion, opposition to feminism, support for traditional family values, opposition to pornography, support for abstinence-only sex education, opposition to LGBT rights, support for school prayer, support for school vouchers, support for homeschooling, support for Sunday blue laws, opposition to gambling, and opposition to recreational drug use, among others.

As many of them are religious, especially Christian fundamentalists, social conservatives push for a focus on Christian traditions as a guiding force for the country on social issues. This includes advocacy for the presence of religion within the public sphere, such as the display of Judeo-Christian statuary in general and especially during Christmastide and Eastertide, as well as supporting the presence of religion in the education system, along with backing parochial schools, as social conservatives believe that "religion is the firmest foundation for the moral development that students need to become productive, law-abiding citizens."

As a term, social conservatism describes conservative stances on socio-cultural issues such as abortion, same-sex marriage, and school prayer as opposed to what is termed social liberalism (cultural liberalism). A social conservative in this sense is closer to the meaning of cultural conservatism than the broader European social conservatism and may hold various different views on fiscal policy.

== Views ==
=== Opposition to abortion ===
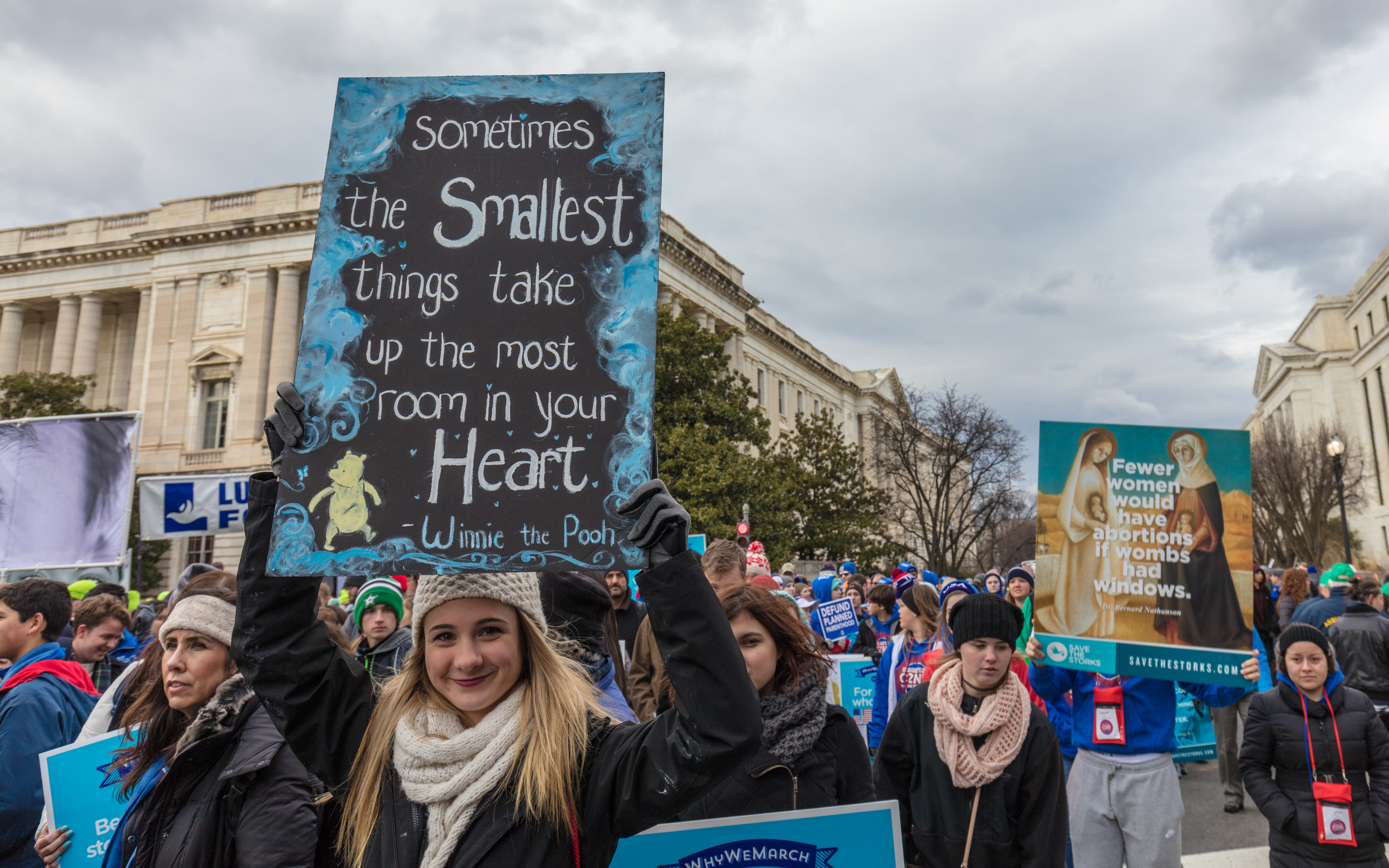
Students at the March for Life in Washington, D.C. in 2017

The United States anti-abortion movement opposes induced abortion on moral and religious grounds and supports its legal prohibition or restriction. Social conservatives supported the overturning of Roe v. Wade and use the term "pro-life" as opposed to "pro-choice". These beliefs are based on the belief of "fetal personhood". Personhood arguments focus on giving a fetus the status of a person which then entitles them to the right to life. Anti-abortion beliefs tend to be associated with conservative Christian groups, especially the Catholic Church.

=== Opposition to feminism ===
Social conservatives often oppose feminism, believing that men and women are fundamentally different and their traditional gender roles in society should be maintained. They often promote women's traditional roles as homemakers and caregivers, discouraging women from participating in the workforce, government, or military. A number of social conservatives favor complementarianism with respect to gender roles.

Social conservatives often blame feminism for many social problems ailing American families. They hold that feminism in modern times has created an upsurge in the non-married population, undermined male authority in families, and contributed to the decline of the traditional family. Many cite the declining birth rate due to legalized abortion. Others have cited the rising rate of single mother families due to rising rates of divorce and out-of-wedlock births, and the resulting psychological and economic toll on children. Children of single or divorced parents are more likely to suffer from poverty and to be incarcerated for behavioral problems.

=== Support for sexual morality ===
Ever since the sexual revolution in 1960s United States, sexual ethics have been a point of contention in the culture war between social conservatives and liberals. Social conservatives with familialist leanings call on the government to exert moral leadership over sexual mores and actively promote family values. They stress the sanctity of marriage and childbirth, blaming social liberalism for the rise in casual sex, premarital sex, masturbation, out-of-wedlock births, teenage pregnancy, sexually transmitted infections, and pornography ever since the mid-20th century.

=== Opposition to pornography ===
Opposition to pornography is a traditional stance of social conservatives in the United States. Many blame pornography for corrupting children, encouraging sexual violence against women, promoting casual sex, and destroying marriages. Many conservative Christians oppose pornography on the basis of biblical teachings equating lust with adultery.

The National Center on Sexual Exploitation, formerly known as Morality in Media, is a socially conservative organization that advances the movement against pornography.

=== Support for abstinence-only sex education ===
Social conservatives are concerned with the moral education and possibly age-inappropriate information children receive from sex education classes in public schools. They prefer abstinence-only sex education for its compatibility with traditional Christian ethics regarding chastity and the sanctity of marriage. Abstinence-only sex education teaches that sex is limited to the bounds of marriage, and that premarital sex is unacceptable. Conversely social conservatives oppose comprehensive sex education as it teaches allegedly morally questionable concepts such as birth control, which they believe leads to premarital sex, sexually transmitted infections, and teenage pregnancy. The wearing of purity rings among unmarried women is encouraged by social conservatives in order to preserve traditional Christian notions regarding human sexuality.

=== Opposition to same-sex marriage ===
Social conservatism opposes same-sex marriage, civil unions, LGBT adoption, and other LGBT rights, as homosexuality goes against fundamental Christian teachings that marriage is between a man and a woman. Social conservatives often believe that homosexuality is abnormal, that the recognition of same-sex unions will promote homosexuality in society, and that children are raised better by opposite-sex couples. Social conservatives are skeptical of the legalization of same-sex marriage, supporting instead laws such as the Defense of Marriage Act (DOMA) which defined marriage as a union between a man and a woman. Some are more tolerant of civil unions than same-sex marriage, but many oppose homosexual relations of any form. While social conservatives sometimes support basic LGBT rights, they are concerned with "normalizing" same-sex relationships through the institution of marriage. Some conservatives support same-sex marriage, such as Log Cabin Republicans.

=== Opposition to transgender rights ===
Social conservatism opposes transgender rights, as it goes against traditional gender roles prescribing adherence to one's biological sex. It opposes allowing transgender people to use their preferred gender identity's pronouns, names, bathrooms, and locker rooms. It also opposes recognition of non-binary genders.

In modern times the relationship between Christianity and transgender people has been strained, as most churches require their members to adhere to what they believe to be their "God-given" gender. Many Christian denominations denounce transsexuality and prohibit transgender people from marrying.

=== Support for school prayer and creationism ===
Social conservatism supports school prayer, which has been banned in public schools ever since a series of 1960s Supreme Court decisions such as Engel v. Vitale. Social conservatives have continued to attack the Supreme Court, blaming these decisions for pushing Christianity out of America's mainstream culture.

Many social conservatives, mainly Christian fundamentalists, believe that creationism or intelligent design should be taught in public schools in place of evolution. More moderate conservatives support the teaching of creationism alongside evolution, specifically promoting theistic evolution, in which God is regarded as guiding evolution.

In public schools, social conservatives have supported classes on "The Bible in History and Literature" (cf. National Council on Bible Curriculum in Public Schools).

=== Support for school vouchers ===
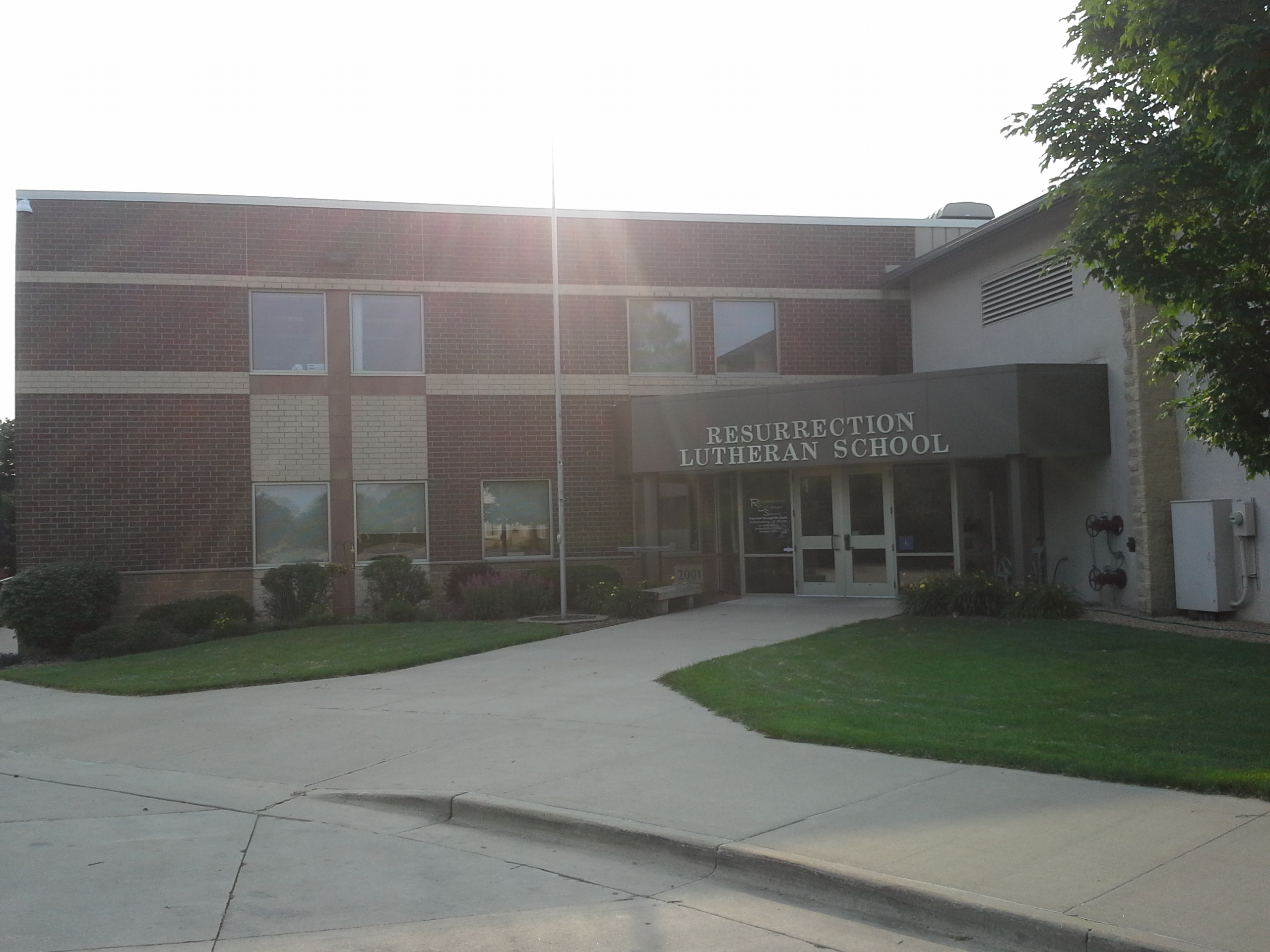
Resurrection Lutheran School, a Christian parochial school of the Wisconsin Evangelical Lutheran Synod (WELS) in Rochester

Peter S. Wenz explains the support of school vouchers, writing: "Social conservatives favor vouchers because they allow religion to be taught in government-funded schools, and they think religion is the firmest foundation for the moral development that students need to become productive, law-abiding citizens."

Social conservatives thus strongly support funding for parochial schools, especially Christian schools.

=== Support for accommodationism ===
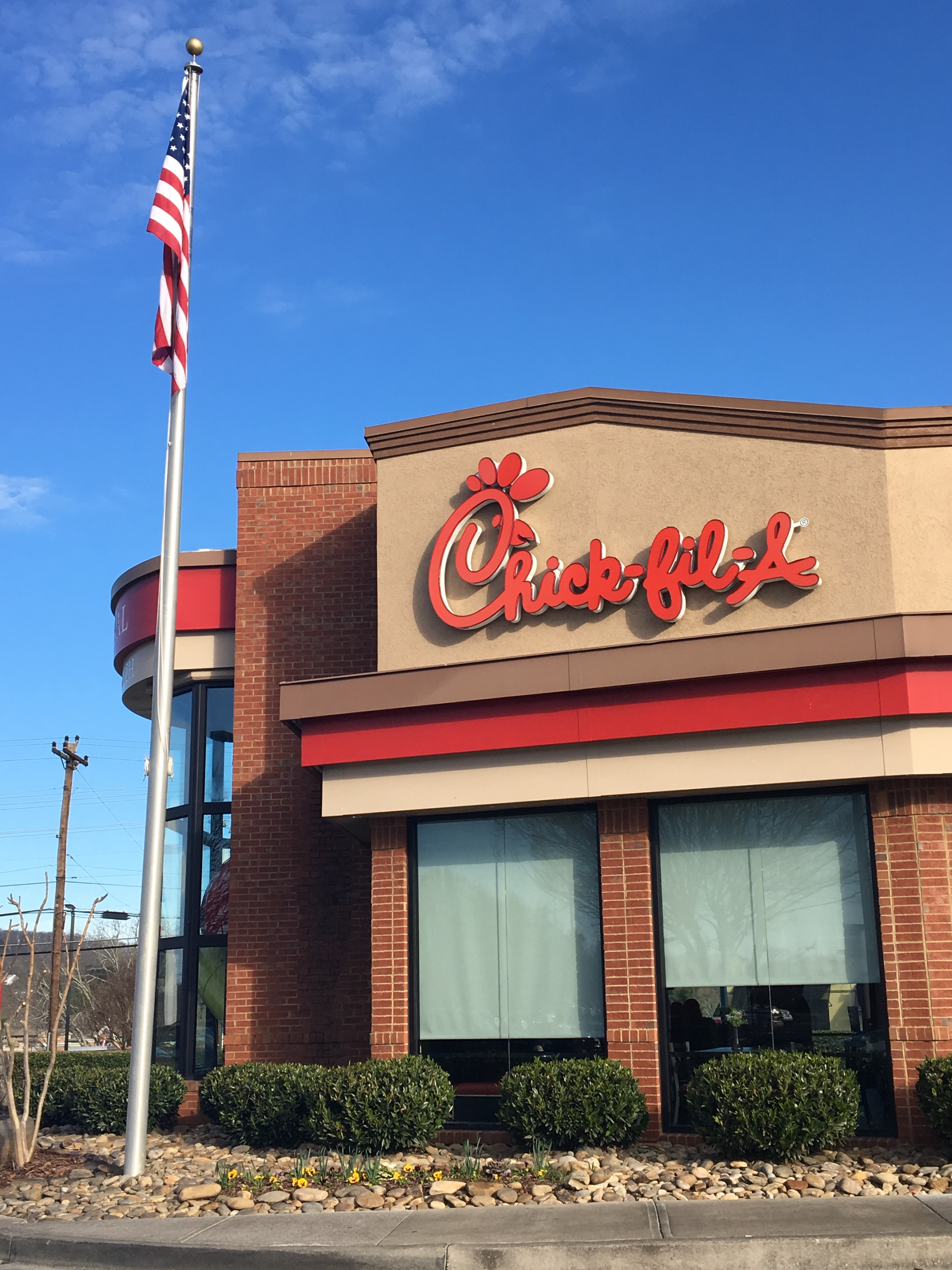
Chick-fil-A, an American fast food chain, closes on Sundays in keeping with Sunday Sabbatarian principles–a practice widely praised by social conservatives.

Social conservatives are accommodationists who often oppose secularism, state atheism, and moral relativism, viewing them as threats to the nation's Christian character. They hold that the Establishment Clause solely prevents the establishment of a state Church nationally, not public acknowledgements of God nor "developing policies that encourage general religious beliefs that do not favor a particular sect and are consistent with the secular government's goals." Such Judeo-Christian heritage includes, for example, the national motto "In God We Trust", the courtroom oath "So help me God", the supplication which begins court sessions "God save the United States and this Honorable Court", "one nation under God" in the Pledge of Allegiance, Congressional prayer, a National Day of Prayer and Thanksgiving, among others.

Notwithstanding, socially conservatives Justices in the United States such as Clarence Thomas have argued that the Establishment Clause's purpose was to prevent federal interference with the established Churches of the states within the Union and that the Constitution does not prevent the establishment of state churches with respect to the states (cf. Federalism).

Social conservatives appeal to Christian nationalism, supporting the idea that the United States was founded as a Christian nation. As such, social conservatives in the United States support Sunday blue laws, which are consistent with Sunday Sabbatarian principles, thus favoring legislation that prohibits Sunday trading (cf. Lord's Day Alliance); social conservatives also back the presence of Judeo-Christian monuments and statues in the public square. In the same vein, social conservatives support regular church attendance and participation in Sunday School.

=== Opposition to drugs ===
Social conservatives in the United States have maintained an opposition to drug usage on moral grounds. They have historically supported the temperance movement and the war on drugs.

=== Opposition to gambling ===
Social conservatives are opposed to gambling, viewing it as immoral. As such, social conservatives have rallied to prevent casinos from opening in areas where they are numerically in strength, citing that gambling is opposed to family values. The Woman's Christian Temperance Union, one of the oldest organizations espousing social conservatism, advanced the argument that "communities with casinos suffer higher rates of home foreclosures, financial distress, and domestic violence", thus calling for people to oppose gambling.

== History ==
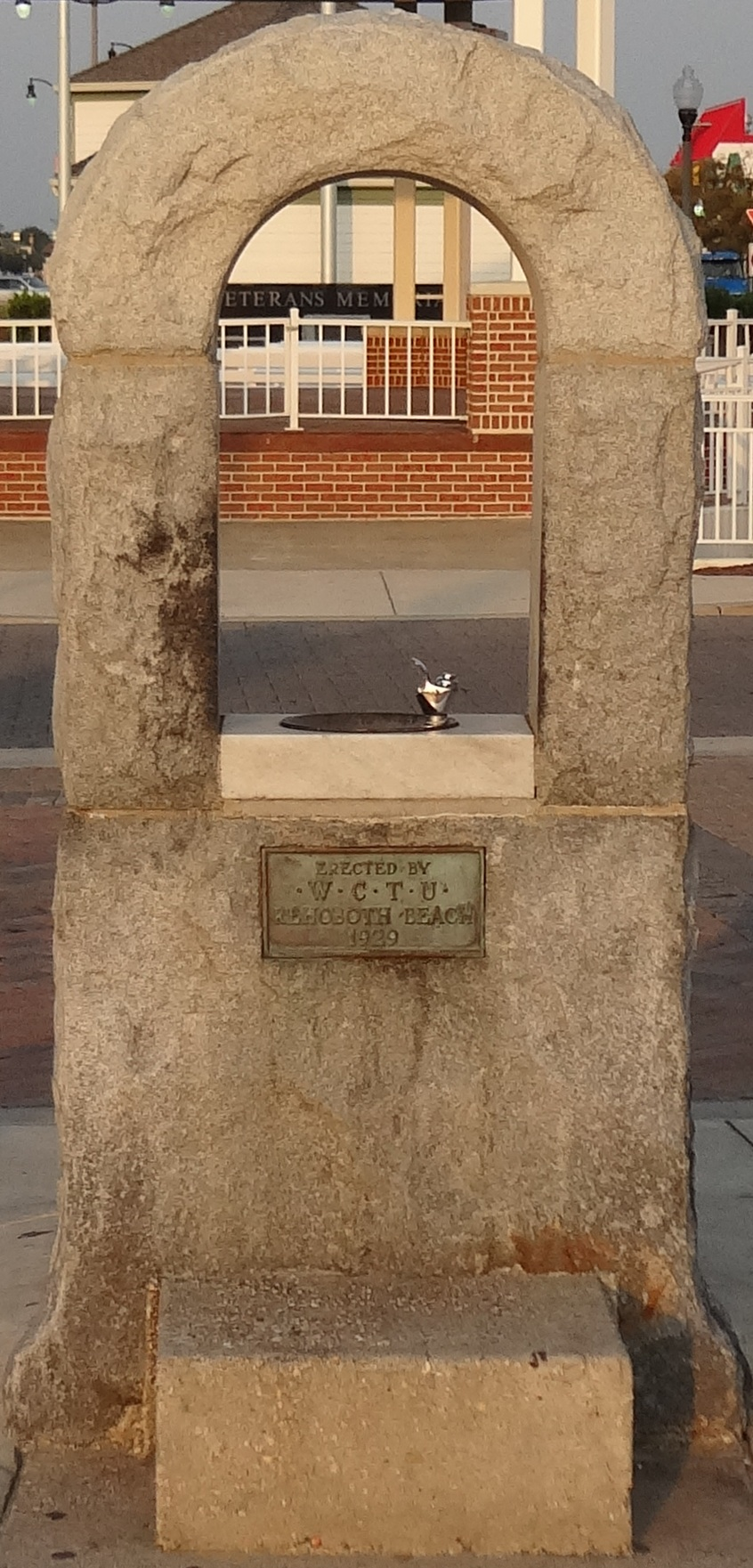
A temperance fountain erected by the Woman's Christian Temperance Union in 1929 in Sussex County, Delaware

The Woman's Christian Temperance Union in the 19th and 20th centuries became a strong force for social conservatism, advancing the temperance movement in the United States.

The 1897 Constitution of the National Reform Association, one of the oldest organizations espousing social conservatism in the United States, with a focus on introducing a Christian amendment to the U.S. Constitution, expressed alarm at what they viewed as:

Perceiving the subtle and persevering attempts which are made to prohibit the reading of the Bible in our Public Schools, to overthrow our Sabbath laws, to corrupt the Family, to abolish the Oath, Prayer in our National and State Legislatures, Days of Fasting and Thanksgiving, and other Christian features of our institutions, and so to divorce the American Government from all connection with the Christian religion; Viewing with grave apprehension in our politics, the legal sanction of the liquor traffic, and the disregard of moral and religious character in those who are exalted to high places in the nation.

The 1960s saw a surge in grassroots social conservative activism in response to the successes of liberal politics in changing American culture. Democrats continued to put forward increasingly liberal policy ideas that ran counter to the beliefs of many conservative Americans which mobilized them to protect their interests. There was a rise of social conservatism that advocated a strong moral code and increased religious authority.

Historians have pointed to the 1970s as a turning point where "a vast shift toward social and political conservatism" really began. Meg Jacobs and Julian E. Zelizer argue that this period saw an increase an activism and concern with personal and social issues which lead to a growth of social conservatism. There are multiple theories on the growth of social conservatism in this period. Some of the possible reasons or combination of reasons for this phenomenon are the backlash to the Vietnam War, the expanded conversation on civil rights, the economic changes in the United States and the overall changes in culture in this period. Some commentators refer to social conservatism and renewed conservative grassroots activism as a reaction to the counterculture and cultural upheaval of the 1960s–1970s. A notable event regarding social policy in the 1970s was the passage of Roe v. Wade in 1973 which recognized a legal right to abortion.

Starting in the 1980s, Ronald Reagan, a prominent conservative Republican, exemplifies the rise of social conservatives in mainstream politics. Reagan appealed to social conservatives who felt marginalized by the growing liberalization of American culture, calling on the "forgotten man" or "moral majority". After the tumultuous period of political and cultural changes in the 1960s–1970s, Reagan's moderate traditionalism appeared as a source of needed stability for many Americans.

Several evangelical Christian organizations with socially conservative goals were founded in the late 1970s, including Christian Voice and Moral Majority, which backed Republican politicians although they had limited impact on legislation. They were followed by Family Research Council and Christian Coalition, among others.

Major conservative welfare reform took place in the 1990s. In 1996, the Personal Responsibility and Work Opportunity Act (PRWORA) was passed narrowing the benefits of welfare recipients and encouraging work. Temporary Assistance for Needy Families (TANF) also came into effect during this period, limiting the time benefits can be received.

Social conservatives again became powerful in American politics in 2001 with the election of socially conservative President George W. Bush. It has been argued that many of Bush's policy decisions were strongly influenced by his religious beliefs. During his time in office, Bush would pass influential conservative social policies such as the Partial-Birth Abortion Ban Act and support an increase in funding of abstinence-only sex education. While President Bush did not strongly promote anti-abortion policies, he supported the movement through an emphasis on parental rights and focus on strict regulation of taxpayer funding.

Socially conservative organizations contributed to the 2020s anti-LGBT movement in the United States and related parental rights movement. Project 2025, published by the Heritage Foundation, includes socially conservative policy proposals.

== Electoral politics ==
In American politics, the Republican Party is the largest political party with some socially conservative ideals incorporated into its platform. Social conservatives predominantly support the Republican Party, although there are also socially conservative Democrats who break ranks with the party platform. Despite this, there have been instances where the Republican Party's nominee has been considered too socially liberal by social conservatives. This has led to the support of third-party candidates from parties such as the Constitution Party, whose philosophies sometimes parallel that of social conservatism. While many social conservatives see third parties as a viable option in such a situation, some high-profile social conservatives see the excessive support of them as dangerous. This fear arises from the possibility of vote splitting. Like any other interest group, social conservatives usually must find a balance between pragmatic electability and ideological principles when supporting candidates.

The American Tea Party movement is generally regarded as fiscally conservatives who tend to avoid social conservative issues. The Tea Party Patriots is officially neutral on social conservatism. While social conservatism tends to emphasize community, faith and family as core values, the Tea Party Patriots identifies its core values as "Fiscal Responsibility, Constitutionally Limited Government, Free Markets". Some branches are opposed to social conservatism. However, independent polls have repeatedly shown that Tea Party supporters are nearly indistinguishable in their views from traditional Republican social conservatives, despite their choice to emphasize economic issues. While not allying itself officially with the Christian conservative movement, members of the Tea Party movement statistically identify with Christianity and social conservatism more often than the general American populace (44% compared to 34% of the population). Some social conservative leaders have criticized the Tea Party movement for "libertarian" and "irreligious" views. Nearly 80% of those in the Tea Party movement are members of the Republican Party.

== Social conservatives ==
=== Notable Social Conservatives ===
- James C Dobson - founded Focus on the Family and Family Policy Alliance
- Paul D Cameron - founded Family Research Institute
- Robert P George - founded Witherspoon Institute
- Francis P Cannon - founded American Principles Project
- John A Howard - founded Howard Center for Family, Religion and Society
- Charles W Socarides - founded Alliance for Therapeutic Choice and Scientific Integrity
- Donald E Wildmon - founded American Family Association
- William R Bright - founded Alliance Defending Freedom
- Armand Nicholi - founded Family Research Council
- Louis P Sheldon - founded Traditional Values Coalition
- Pat Robertson - founded American Centre for Law and Justice
- Jerry Falwell - founded Moral Majority
- Charlie Kirk - founded Turning Point USA
- Ben Shapiro - founded The Daily Wire

=== Social Conservatives via Affiliation ===
- Michele Bachmann
- Pat Buchanan
- Ted Cruz
- Jerry Falwell Jr.
- Newt Gingrich
- Mike Huckabee
- Mike Johnson
- Rush Limbaugh
- Sarah Palin
- Mike Pence
- Rick Santorum
- Rick Scarborough
- Phyllis Schlafly
- JD Vance

=== Political parties ===
- Republican Party
- American Communist Party – socially conservative but economically far-left
- American Solidarity Party – socially conservative but supports government intervention in the economy
- Prohibition Party – socially conservative but supports government intervention in the economy
- Christian Liberty Party
- Constitution Party

=== Organizations ===
- American College of Pediatricians
- Alliance Defending Freedom
- American Center for Law and Justice
- American Family Association
- American Principles Project
- Becket Fund for Religious Liberty
- Christian Coalition of America
- Concerned Women for America
- Family Research Council
- First Liberty Institute
- Foundation for Moral Law
- Knights of Columbus
- Liberty Counsel
- Lord's Day Alliance
- Medical Institute for Sexual Health
- Moral Majority
- National Center on Sexual Exploitation
- National Council on Bible Curriculum in Public Schools
- National Reform Association
- Pacific Justice Institute
- Wallbuilders
- Woman's Christian Temperance Union
- Values Voter Summit

== See also ==
- Christian right
- Christian democracy
- Factions in the Republican Party
- Fiscal conservatism
- Moralism
- Paleoconservatism
- Traditionalist conservatism
