= Ella M. George =

American teacher, lecturer, temperance advocate, social reformer (1850–1938)

Ella M. George LL.D.
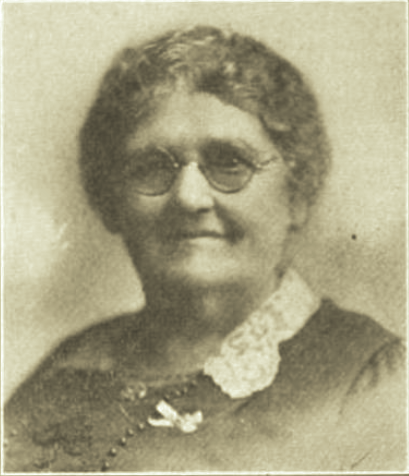
- Born: Eleanor McElroy Martin; December 4, 1850 near Freeport, Westmoreland County, Pennsylvania, U.S.
- Died: March 31, 1938 (aged 87); Wilkinsburg, Pennsylvania
- Resting place: Beaver Cemetery in Beaver Falls, Pennsylvania
- Education: Curry Normal School; Newell Institute
- Occupations: teacher; lecturer; social reformer; newspaper editor
- Spouse: Henry Hosick George (m. 1897; died 1914)
- Writing career
- Language: English
- Subject: temperance

Ella M. George (née, Martin; December 4, 1850 – March 31, 1938) was an American teacher, lecturer, and social reformer. For 25 years, she was a teacher in Pittsburgh, Pennsylvania. A long-time leader in temperance and other moral reforms, George served as Pennsylvania state president of the Woman's Christian Temperance Union (WCTU) for 22 years. While she deplored the methods of militant suffragettes, she held that equal suffrage would go a long way toward winning the victory the WCTU sought. She also sat on the board of directors of the National Reform Association, briefly serving as its executive secretary.

== Early life and education ==
Eleanor McElroy Martin was born near Freeport, Westmoreland County, Pennsylvania on December 4, 1850. She was the youngest of eleven children born to Thomas and Hannah Martin.

At an early age, George moved with her family to Pittsburgh. She was educated in the common schools of Pittsburgh, Central High School, Curry Normal School, later taking a course at the Newell Institute.

== Career ==
=== National Reform Association ===
George taught in the Moorhead School, Pittsburgh, from 1870 to 1897. In the latter year, she married Henry Hosick George (1833-1914), a minister and educator. He had been the field secretary of the National Reform Association, and in 1872, became president of Geneva College of Beaver Falls, Pennsylvania. She traveled with him, holding conventions in cities from Boston to Los Angeles. Spending ten years in the lecture field under the auspices of the National Reform Association, she discussed temperance, Sunday observance, Christian citizenship, purity in family relations, and similar subjects.

George wrote many essays and addresses for public meetings, articles for the newspapers, and notes on Sunday school lessons which were published in the Christian Statesman.

=== Woman's Christian Temperance Union ===
Attracted early in life to temperance reform, George joined the WCTU when it was first organized in Pittsburgh, becoming president of the Beaver County, Pennsylvania WCTU in 1904. While serving in this role for a year, soon after her return from her lecture tours, she was elected Pennsylvania State president in 1907, holding both offices for one year. The 20,000 mark was passed by the time of the 1908 annual state convention, nearly 3,000 new members since the previous year, with the Pennsylvania WCTU recording 25,000 members by 1910.

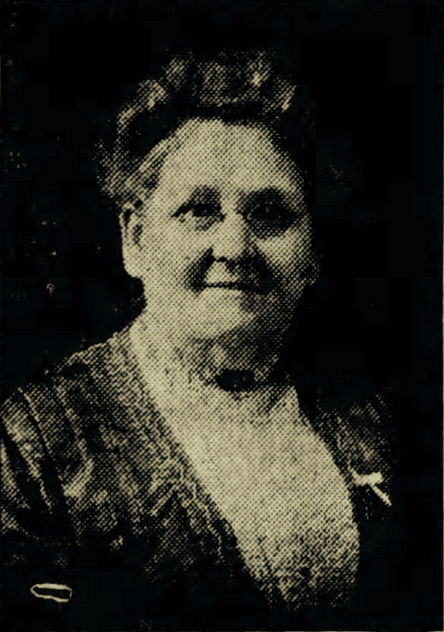
1911

The 1913 state convention, held in Johnstown, reported a record gain in membership of 2,860 for the year, totalling 30,282 members; there, George was appointed delegate-at-large to the World WCTU convention. In March 1914, George represented the WCTU at the first State "no-license" convention attended by various supporting organizations which also included the Anti-Saloon League, YMCA, the Pennsylvania Christian Endeavor, the Pennsylvania Grange, and others. At the 48th annual convention, held in Williamsport, membership had reached about 50,000 women in the state. In 1925, at the 51st annual convention, held in Harrisburg, she advocated for the elimination of "impure movies" and the "filthy products of our news stands" as two imperative duties which the WCTU must undertake.

George received the honorary degree of LL.D. conferred on her by Geneva College at its commencement in June 1926. Those who conferred this degree felt that it had been merited because of George's activities along legislative lines and also because she was an expert parliamentarian. By virtue of her office as state president, she was legislative superintendent of the organization and had such experience as a lobbyist during those 18 years both in the State legislature and in the U.S. Congress, having spoken at hearings before committees of both of these bodies. She was instrumental largely in securing from the Legislature of 1919 a law setting aside one day in the public schools to be known as Willard Day. It was George who went to the governor when the Legislature refused to make an appropriation for law enforcement and she said, "The WCTU will raise it." She served many times on committees appointed by the governor. She appeared before the U.S. Senate committee on investigation of the slush fund used in the primary, with Senator James A. Reed as chairman of this committee, and she gave the information regarding the raising and disposing of the Pinchot enforcement fund.

While state president, George also served as editor of the monthly Pennsylvania W.C.T.U. Bulletin paper.

Refusing to stand as a candidate for re-election in 1929, she took the title of honorary state president that year; in her honor, the WCTU headquarters building, located at Harrisburg, was named the "Ella M. George" House.

== Personal life ==
George made her home on College Hill, in Beaver Falls, where she was a member of the College Hill Reformed Presbyterian Church. At one time, she managed one of the old people's homes of her church (Reformed Presbyterian). She was a life member of the Florence Crittenden Home, the National WCTU, the Pennsylvania WCTU, and a number of county unions in Pennsylvania. She was an advocate of woman suffrage.

George had been residing at the home of her nephew in Wilkinsburg, Pennsylvania for six months before she died there of old age, March 31, 1938. Burial was at the Beaver Cemetery in Beaver Falls, Pennsylvania.
