= National Reform Association (chartered 1864) =

Christian organization in the United States

The National Reform Association (NRA), formerly known as the National Association to Secure the Religious Amendment of the United States Constitution, is an organization that seeks to introduce a Christian amendment to the U.S. Constitution in order to make the United States a Christian state. Founded in 1864, the National Reform Association included representatives from eleven Christian denominations as well as the official support of a number of Churches. It publishes a magazine called The Christian Statesman.

== History ==
The National Reform Association was founded in 1864 by representatives from eleven Christian Churches in the United States. It sought to, and continues to advocate for the following Christian amendment to be introduced to the U.S. Constitution:

"We the people" would acknowledge "Almighty God as the source of all authority and power in civil government, the Lord Jesus Christ as the Ruler among nations, His revealed will as the supreme law of the land, in order to constitute a Christian government..."

This movement soon gained the support of several Churches. For example, the Wesleyan Methodist Church, in its 1896 Disciple contained a section on National Reform, which continues to be retained by its successor, the Allegheny Wesleyan Methodist Connection in its most recent 2014 Discipline that contains the following statement:

It shall be the duty of the ministers and members of the Wesleyan Methodist Connection to use their influence in every feasible manner in favor of a more complete recognition of the authority of Almighty God, in the secular and civil relations, both of society and of government, and the authority of our Lord Jesus Christ as King of nations as well as King of saints.

As such, the Allegheny Wesleyan Methodist Church advocates for Bible reading in public schools, chaplaincies in the Armed Forces and in Congress, Sunday blue laws (reflecting historic Methodist belief in Sunday Sabbatarianism), and amendments that advance the recognition of God.

The National Reform Association desired for reverence for the Sunday Sabbath, opposing the distribution of newspapers on the Lord's Day as Sunday newspapers became popular in the 1880s.

In 1895, the Woman's Christian Temperance Union (WCTU), which was at that time the largest women's organization in the United States, proclaimed its solidarity with the National Reform Association "whose efforts are parallel to ours on many lines." To this end, the WCTU passed a resolution "God in Christ is the King of Nations, and as such should be acknowledged in our government; and His Word made the basis of our laws."

In the early 1900s, the National Reform Association supported the aims of the temperance movement, which was supported by many Christians at that time.

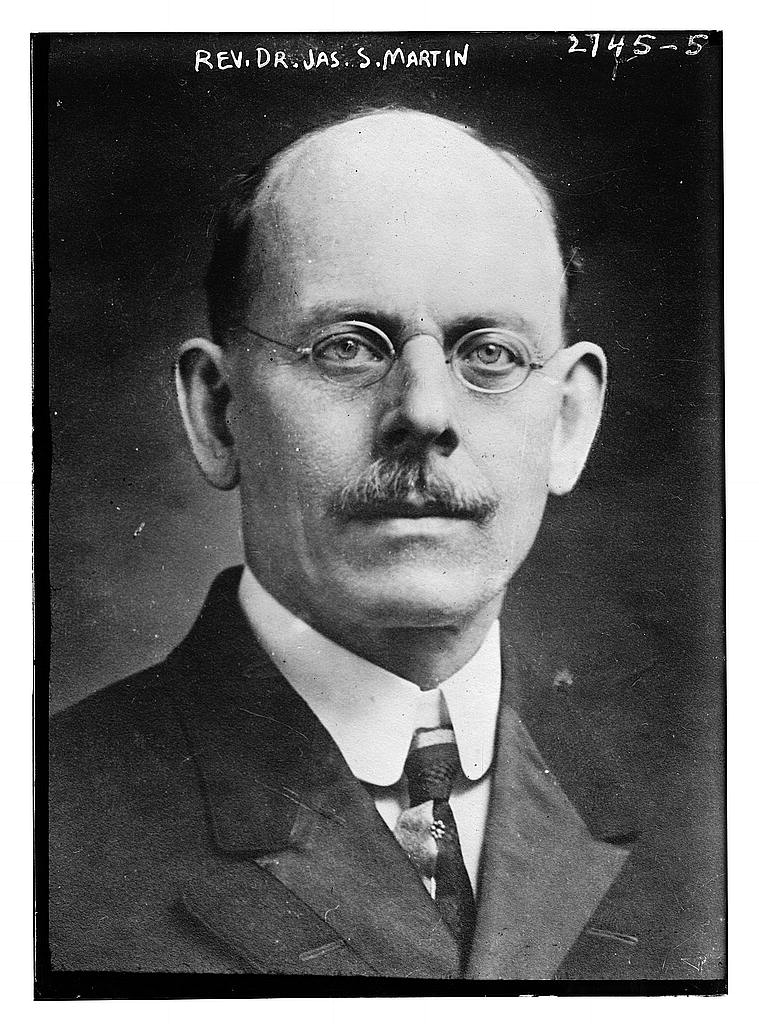
James Sankey Martin, president of the National Reform Association, 1913-1914

James Sankey Martin was the general superintendent of the National Reform Association who led an anti-Mormon crusade in 1913–1914.

== Notable people ==
- Sara Jane Crafts, editor-in-chief of the Christian Statesman, the official organ of the National Reform Association
- Ella M. George

== See also ==
- Accommodationism
- Christian democracy
- Christian nationalism
- Christian reconstructionism
- Christian right
- David Barton (author)
- First-day Sabbatarianism
- Foundation for Moral Law
- List of Temperance organizations
- Keep Sunday Special
- Lord's Day Alliance
- Lord's Day Observance Society
- Moralism
- Social conservatism in the United States
