= Texas Freedom Network =

- Abbreviation: TFN
- Formation: 1995
- Type: Non-profit
- Legal status: 501(c)(4) Educational Organization
- Purpose: Religious Freedom, Civil Liberties
- Headquarters: Austin, Texas
- Region served: Texas
- Members: 150,000
- President/Executive Director: Val Benavidez
- Affiliations: Texas Freedom Network Education Fund
- Website: tfn.org

The Texas Freedom Network (TFN) is a Texas organization which describes its goals as protecting religious freedom, defending civil liberties, and strengthening public schools in the state. It works to counter the activities of the Christian right. Founded in 1996 by Cecile Richards, the daughter of former Governor Ann W. Richards. The group has over 150,000 members as of 2026.

== History ==
The organization was founded on February 17, 1995 after Richards attended her first Texas State Board of Education meeting in January 1995. She reported being shocked by what she viewed as far-right extremists hijacking discussion on new health textbooks by "attacking sex education, demonizing] LGBT people, and pushing a host of other issues that energize religious-right activists." She passed a note on a napkin to her friend, Harriett Peppel, during the meeting that said "it's worse than I imagined."

== Leadership and direction ==
Under Richards, the organization focused mainly on education, but under the leadership of Samantha Smoot (1998–2004), it broadened its focus to include hate crimes and gay rights. As of January 2025, Felicia Martin is the President and Executive Director of TFN.

The TFN has opposed the attempts of Don McLeroy and other religious conservatives on the Texas State Board of Education to mandate that Texas high schools offer Bible classes and change history textbook standards, arguing that many of the proposed changes violate religious freedom and the separation of church and state. TFN has also closely followed the activities of the State Board of Education and activists on other education issues, such as the teaching of evolution, sex education, and mandatory school prayer in public schools.

== Bible study curricula ==
In 2005 TFN criticized the National Council on Bible Curriculum in Public Schools curriculum for promoting a fundamentalist Christian view and violating religious freedom. It commissioned a report by Southern Methodist University biblical scholar Mark A. Chancey, which found:

a blatant sectarian bias, distortions of history and science, numerous factual errors, poor sourcing reveal a curriculum that is clearly inappropriate for the 1,000 public schools the NCBCPS claims use its materials.

== Evolution curricula ==
In a survey commissioned by TFN, "94% of Texas scientists indicated that claimed 'weaknesses' of evolution are not valid scientific objections to evolution (with 87% saying that they 'strongly disagree' that such weaknesses should be considered valid)."

== Other issues ==
- In February 2009 a TFN-funded study conducted by two Texas State University researchers, titled Just Say Don't Know: Sexuality Education in Texas Public Schools found that in many cases, students are given misleading and inaccurate information about the risks associated with sex.
