= Familialism =

Philosophy that prioritizes the family

Familialism or familism is a philosophy that puts priority to family. The term familialism has been specifically used for advocating a welfare system wherein it is presumed that families will take responsibility for the care of their members rather than leaving that responsibility to the government. The term familism relates more to family values. This can manifest as prioritizing the needs of the family higher than that of individuals. Yet, the two terms are often used interchangeably. Researchers have measured a similar concept called "responsibilism," which emphasizes duties to family and close relationships over acquaintances and weak ties in 100 cultures around the world.

In the Western world, familialism views the nuclear family of one father, one mother, and their child or children as the central and primary social unit of human ordering and the principal unit of a functioning society and civilization. In Asia, aged parents living with the family is often viewed as traditional. It is suggested that Asian familialism became more fixed after encounters with Europeans following the Age of Discovery. In Japan, drafts based on French laws were rejected after criticism from people like Hozumi Yatsuka (穂積 八束) by the reason that "civil law will destroy filial piety".

Regarding familism as a fertility factor, there is limited support among Hispanics of an increased number of children with increased familism in the sense of prioritizing the needs of the family higher than that of individuals. On the other hand, the fertility impact is unknown in regard to systems where the majority of the economic and caring responsibilities rest on the family (such as in Southern Europe), as opposed to defamilialized systems where welfare and caring responsibilities are largely supported by the state (such as Nordic countries).

== Western familism ==
In the Western world, familialism views the nuclear family of one father, one mother, and their child or children as the central and primary social unit of human ordering and the principal unit of a functioning society and civilization. Accordingly, this unit is also the basis of a multi-generational extended family, which is embedded in socially as well as genetically inter-related communities, nations, etc., and ultimately in the whole human family past, present and future. As such, Western familialism usually opposes other social forms and models that are chosen as alternatives (i.e. single-parent, LGBT parenting, etc.).

=== Historical and philosophical background of Western familism ===
==== Ancient political familialism ====
"Family as a model for the state" as an idea in political philosophy originated in the Socratic-Platonic principle of macrocosm/microcosm, which identifies recurrent patterns at larger and smaller scales of the cosmos, including the social world. In particular, monarchists have argued that the state mirrors the patriarchal family, with the subjects obeying the king as children obey their father, which in turn helps to justify monarchical or aristocratic rule.

Plutarch (46–120 CE) records a laconic saying of the Dorians attributed to Lycurgus (8th century BCE). Asked why he did not establish a democracy in Lacedaemon (Sparta), Lycurgus responded, "Begin, friend, and set it up in your family". Plutarch claims that Spartan government resembled the family in its form.

Aristotle (384–322 BCE) argued that the schema of authority and subordination exists in the whole of nature. He gave examples such as man and animal (domestic), man and wife, slaves and children. Further, he claimed that it is found in any animal, as the relationship he believed to exist between soul and body, of "which the former is by nature the ruling and the later subject factor". Aristotle further asserted that "the government of a household is a monarchy since every house is governed by a single ruler". Later, he said that husbands exercise a republican government over their wives and monarchical government over their children, and that they exhibit political office over slaves and royal office over the family in general.

Arius Didymus (1st century CE), cited centuries later by Stobaeus, wrote that "A primary kind of association (politeia) is the legal union of a man and woman for begetting children and for sharing life". From the collection of households a village is formed and from villages a city, "So just as the household yields for the city the seeds of its formation, thus it yields the constitution (politeia)". Further, Didymus claims that "Connected with the house is a pattern of monarchy, of aristocracy and of democracy. The relationship of parents to children is monarchic, of husbands to wives aristocratic, of children to one another democratic".

==== Modern political familialism ====
The family is in the center of the social philosophy of the early Chicago School of Economics. It is a recurring point of reference in the economic and social theories of its founder Frank Knight. Knight positions his notion of the family in contrast to the dominant notion of individualism:

"Our 'individualism' is really 'familism'. ... The family is still the unit in production and consumption."

Some modern thinkers, such as Louis de Bonald, have written as if the family were a miniature state. In his analysis of the family relationships of father, mother and child, Bonald related these to the functions of a state: the father is the power, the mother is the minister and the child as subject. As the father is "active and strong" and the child is "passive or weak", the mother is the "median term between the two extremes of this continuous proportion". Like many apologists for political familialism, De Bonald justified his analysis on biblical authority:

"(It) calls man the reason, the head, the power of woman: Vir caput est mulieris (the man is head of the woman) says St. Paul. It calls woman the helper or minister of man: "Let us make man," says Genesis, "a helper similar to him." It calls the child a subject, since it tells it, in a thousand places, to obey its parents".

Bonald also sees divorce as the first stage of disorder in the state, insisting that the deconstitution of the family brings about the deconstitution of state, with The Kyklos not far behind.

Erik von Kuehnelt-Leddihn also connects family and monarchy:

"Due to its inherent patriarchalism, monarchy fits organically into the ecclesiastic and familistic pattern of a Christian society. (Compare the teaching of Pope Leo XIII: 'Likewise the powers of fathers of families preserves expressly a certain image and form of the authority which is in God, from which all paternity in heaven and earth receives its name—Eph 3.15') The relationship between the King as 'father of the fatherland' and the people is one of mutual love".

George Lakoff has more recently claimed that the left-right distinction in politics reflects a different ideals of the family; for the right-wing, the ideal is a patriarchal family based upon absolutist morality; for the left-wing, the ideal is an unconditionally loving family. As a result, Lakoff argues, both sides find each other's views not only immoral, but incomprehensible, since they appear to violate each side's deeply held beliefs about personal morality in the sphere of the family.

=== Criticism of Western familism ===
==== Criticism in practice ====
Familialism has been challenged as historically and sociologically inadequate to describe the complexity of actual family relations. In modern American society in which the male head of the household can no longer be guaranteed a wage suitable to support a family, 1950s-style familialism has been criticized as counterproductive to family formation and fertility.

Imposition of Western-style familialism on other cultures has been disruptive to traditional non-nuclear family forms such as matrilineality.

The rhetoric of "family values" has been used to demonize single mothers and LGBT couples, who allegedly lack them. This has a disproportionate impact on the African-American community, as African-American women are more likely to be single mothers.

==== Criticism from the LGBT community ====
LGBT communities tend to accept and support the diversity of intimate human associations, partially as a result of their historically ostracized status from nuclear family structures. From its inception in the late 1960s, the gay rights movement has asserted every individual's right to create and define their own relationships and family in the way most conducive to the safety, happiness, and self-actualization of each individual.

For example, the glossary of LGBT terms of Family Pride Canada, a Canadian organization advocating for family equality for LGBT parents, defines familialism as:

a rigidly conservative ideology promoted by the defenders of "Family Values," who insist, despite all the sociological evidence to the contrary, that the only real family is a traditional 1950s-style white, middle-class household with a faithfully married dad and a mom whose sex life is strictly yet blissfully procreative, and whose high moral standards are passed on like old china to their perfectly heterosexual children.

==== Criticism in psychology ====
Normalization of the nuclear family as the only healthy environment for children has been criticized by psychologists. In a peer-reviewed study from 2007, adoptees have been shown to display self-esteem comparable with non-adoptees.

In a meta-study from 2012, "quality of parenting and parent–child relationships" is described as the most important factor to children development. Also "Dimensions of family structure including such factors as divorce, single parenthood, and the parents' sexual orientation and biological relatedness between parents and children are of little or no predictive importance"

==== Criticism in psychoanalysis ====
Gilles Deleuze and Félix Guattari, in their now-classic 1972 book Anti-Oedipus, argued that psychiatry and psychoanalysis, since their inception, have been affected by an incurable familialism, which is their ordinary bed and board. Psychoanalysis has never escaped from this, having remained captive to an unrepentant familialism.

Michel Foucault wrote that through familialism psychoanalysis completed and perfected what the psychiatry of 19th century insane asylums had set out to do and that it enforced the power structures of bourgeois society and its values: Family-Children (paternal authority), Fault-Punishment (immediate justice), Madness-Disorder (social and moral order). Deleuze and Guattari added that "the familialism inherent in psychoanalysis doesn't so much destroy classical psychiatry as shine forth as the latter's crowning achievement", and that since the 19th century, the study of mental illnesses and madness has remained the prisoner of the familial postulate and its correlates.

Through familialism, and the psychoanalysis based on it, guilt is inscribed upon the family's smallest member, the child, and parental authority is absolved.

According to Deleuze and Guattari, among the psychiatrists only Karl Jaspers and Ronald Laing, have escaped familialism. This was not the case of the culturalist psychoanalysts, which, despite their conflict with orthodox psychoanalysts, had a "stubborn maintenance of a familialist perspective", still speaking "the same language of a familialized social realm".

==== Criticism in Marxism ====
In The Communist Manifesto of 1848, Karl Marx describes how the bourgeois or monogamous two-parent family has as its foundation capital and private gain. Marx also pointed out that this family existed only in its full form among the bourgeoisie or upper classes, and was nearly absent among the exploited proletariat or working class. He felt that the vanishment of capital would also result in the vanishment of the monogamous marriage, and the exploitation of the working class. He explains how family ties among the proletarians are divided by the capitalist system, and their children are used simply as instruments of labour. This is partly due to child labour laws being less strict at the time in Western society. In Marx's view, the bourgeois husband sees his wife as an instrument of labour, and therefore to be exploited, as instruments of production (or labour) exist under capitalism for this purpose.

In The Origin of the Family, Private Property, and the State, published in 1884, Frederick Engels was also extremely critical of the monogamous two parent family and viewed it as one of many institutions for the division of labour in capitalist society. In his chapter "The Monogamous Family", Engels traces monogamous marriage back to the Greeks, who viewed the practice's sole aim as making "the man supreme in the family, and to propagate, as the future heirs to his wealth, children indisputably his own". He felt that the monogamous marriage made explicit the subjugation of one sex by the other throughout history, and that the first division of labour "is that between man and woman for the propagation of children". Engels views the monogamous two-parent family as a microcosm of society, stating "It is the cellular form of civilized society, in which the nature of the oppositions and contradictions fully active in that society can be already studied".

Engels pointed out disparities between the legal recognition of a marriage, and the reality of it. A legal marriage is entered into freely by both partners, and the law states both partners must have common ground in rights and duties. There are other factors that the bureaucratic legal system cannot take into account however, since it is "not the law's business". These may include differences in the class position of both parties and pressure on them from outside to bear children.

For Engels, the obligation of the husband in the traditional two-parent familial structure is to earn a living and support his family. This gives him a position of supremacy. This role is given without a particular need for special legal titles or privileges. Within the family, he represents the bourgeois, and the wife represents the proletariat. Engels, on the other hand, equates the position of the wife in marriage with one of exploitation and prostitution, as she sells her body "once and for all into slavery".

More recent criticism from a Marxist perspective comes from Lisa Healy in her 2009 essay "Capitalism and the Transforming Family Unit: A Marxist Analysis". Her essay examines the single-parent family, defining it as one parent, often a woman, living with one or more usually unmarried children. The stigmatization of lone parents is tied to their low rate of participation in the workforce, and a pattern of dependency on welfare. This results in less significant contributions to the capitalist system on their part. This stigmatization is reinforced by the state, such as through insufficient welfare payments. This exposes capitalist interests that are inherent to their society and which favour two-parent families.

== In politics ==
=== Australia ===
The Family First Party originally contested the 2002 South Australian state election, where former Assemblies of God pastor Andrew Evans won one of the eleven seats in the 22-seat South Australian Legislative Council on 4 percent of the statewide vote. The party made their federal debut at the 2004 general election, electing Steve Fielding on 2 percent of the Victorian vote in the Australian Senate, out of six Victorian senate seats up for election. Both MPs were able to be elected with Australia's Single Transferable Vote and Group voting ticket system in the upper house. The party opposes abortion, euthanasia, harm reduction, gay adoptions, in-vitro fertilisation (IVF) for gay couples and gay civil unions. It supports drug prevention, zero tolerance for law breaking, rehabilitation, and avoidance of all sexual behaviors it considers deviant.

In the 2007 Australian election, Family First came under fire for giving preferences in some areas to the Liberty and Democracy Party, a libertarian party that supports legalization of incest, gay marriage, and drug use.

=== United Kingdom ===
Family values was a recurrent theme in the Conservative government of John Major. His Back to Basics initiative became the subject of ridicule after the party was affected by a series of sleaze scandals. John Major himself, the architect of the policy, was subsequently found to have had an affair with Edwina Currie. Family values were revived under David Cameron, being a recurring theme in his speeches on social responsibility and related policies, demonstrated by his Marriage Tax allowance policy which would provide tax breaks for married couples.

=== New Zealand ===
Family values politics reached their apex under the social conservative administration of the Third National Government (1975–84), widely criticised for its populist and social conservative views about abortion and homosexuality. Under the Fourth Labour Government (1984–90), homosexuality was decriminalised and abortion access became easier to obtain.

In the early 1990s, New Zealand reformed its electoral system, replacing the first-past-the-post electoral system with the Mixed Member Proportional system. This provided a particular impetus to the formation of separatist conservative Christian political parties, disgruntled at the Fourth National Government (1990–99), which seemed to embrace bipartisan social liberalism to offset Labour's earlier appeal to social liberal voters. Such parties tried to recruit conservative Christian voters to blunt social liberal legislative reforms, but had meagre success in doing so. During the tenure of Fifth Labour Government (1999–2008), prostitution law reform (2003), same-sex civil unions (2005) and the repeal of laws that permitted parental corporal punishment of children (2007) became law.

At present, Family First New Zealand, a 'non-partisan' social conservative lobby group, operates to try to forestall further legislative reforms such as same-sex marriage and same-sex adoption. In 2005, conservative Christians tried to pre-emptively ban same-sex marriage in New Zealand through alterations to the New Zealand Bill of Rights Act 1990, but the bill failed 47 votes to 73 at its first reading. At most, the only durable success such organisations can claim in New Zealand is the continuing criminality of cannabis possession and use under New Zealand's Misuse of Drugs Act 1975.

=== Russia ===
Federal law of Russian Federation no. 436-FZ of 2010-12-23 "On Protecting Children from Information Harmful to Their Health and Development" lists information "negating family values and forming disrespect to parents and/or other family members" as information not suitable for children ("18+" rating). It does not contain any separate definition of family values.

=== Singapore ===
Singapore's main political party, the People's Action Party, promotes family values intensively. Former Prime Minister Lee Hsien Loong said that "The family is the basic building block of our society. [...] And by "family" in Singapore, we mean one man, one woman, marrying, having children and bringing up children within that framework of a stable family unit." One MP has described the nature of family values in the city-state as "almost Victorian in nature". The government is opposed to same-sex adoption. The Singaporean justice system uses corporal punishment.

=== United States ===
The use of family values as a political term dates back to 1976, when it appeared in the Republican Party platform. The phrase became more widespread after Vice President Dan Quayle used it in a speech at the 1992 Republican National Convention. Quayle had also launched a national controversy when he criticized the television program Murphy Brown for a story line that depicted the title character becoming a single mother by choice, citing it as an example of how popular culture contributes to a "poverty of values", and saying: "[i]t doesn't help matters when primetime TV has Murphy Brown—a character who supposedly epitomizes today's intelligent, highly paid, professional woman—mocking the importance of fathers, by bearing a child alone, and calling it just another 'lifestyle choice'". Quayle's remarks initiated widespread controversy, and have had a continuing effect on U.S. politics. Stephanie Coontz, a professor of family history and the author of several books and essays about the history of marriage, says that this brief remark by Quayle about Murphy Brown "kicked off more than a decade of outcries against the 'collapse of the family'".

In 1998, a Harris survey found that:

- 52% of women and 42% of men thought family values means "loving, taking care of, and supporting each other"
- 38% of women and 35% of men thought family values means "knowing right from wrong and having good values"
- 2% of women and 1% men thought of family values in terms of the "traditional family"

The survey noted that 93% of all women thought that society should value all types of families (Harris did not publish the responses for men).

==== Republican Party ====
Since 1980, the Republican Party has used the issue of family values to attract socially conservative voters. While "family values" remains an amorphous concept, social conservatives usually understand the term to include some combination of the following principles (also referenced in the 2004 Republican Party platform):

- opposition to sex outside of marriage
- support for a traditional role for women in "the family"
- opposition to same-sex marriage, homosexuality and gender transition
- support for complementarianism
- opposition to legalized induced abortion
- support for abstinence-only sex education
- support for policies said to protect children from obscenity and exploitation

Social and religious conservatives often use the term "family values" to promote conservative ideology that supports traditional morality or Christian values. Social conservatism in the United States is centered on the preservation of what adherents often call 'traditional' or 'family values'. Some American conservative Christians see their religion as the source of morality and consider the nuclear family an essential element in society. For example, "The American Family Association exists to motivate and equip citizens to change the culture to reflect Biblical truth and traditional family values." Such groups variously oppose abortion, pornography, masturbation, pre-marital sex, polygamy, homosexuality, certain aspects of feminism, cohabitation, separation of church and state, legalization of recreational drugs, and depictions of sexuality in the media.

==== Democratic Party ====
Although the term "family values" remains a core issue for the Republican Party, the Democratic Party has also used the term, though differing in its definition. In his acceptance speech at the 2004 Democratic National Convention, John Kerry said "it is time for those who talk about family values to start valuing families".

Other liberals have used the phrase to support such values as family planning, affordable child-care, and maternity leave. For example, groups such as People For the American Way, Planned Parenthood, and Parents and Friends of Lesbians and Gays have attempted to define the concept in a way that promotes the acceptance of single-parent families, same-sex monogamous relationships and marriage. This understanding of family values does not promote conservative morality, instead focusing on encouraging and supporting alternative family structures, access to contraception and abortion, increasing the minimum wage, sex education, childcare, and parent-friendly employment laws, which provide for maternity leave and leave for medical emergencies involving children.

While conservative sexual ethics focus on preventing premarital or non-procreative sex, liberal sexual ethics are typically directed rather towards consent, regardless of whether or not the partners are married.

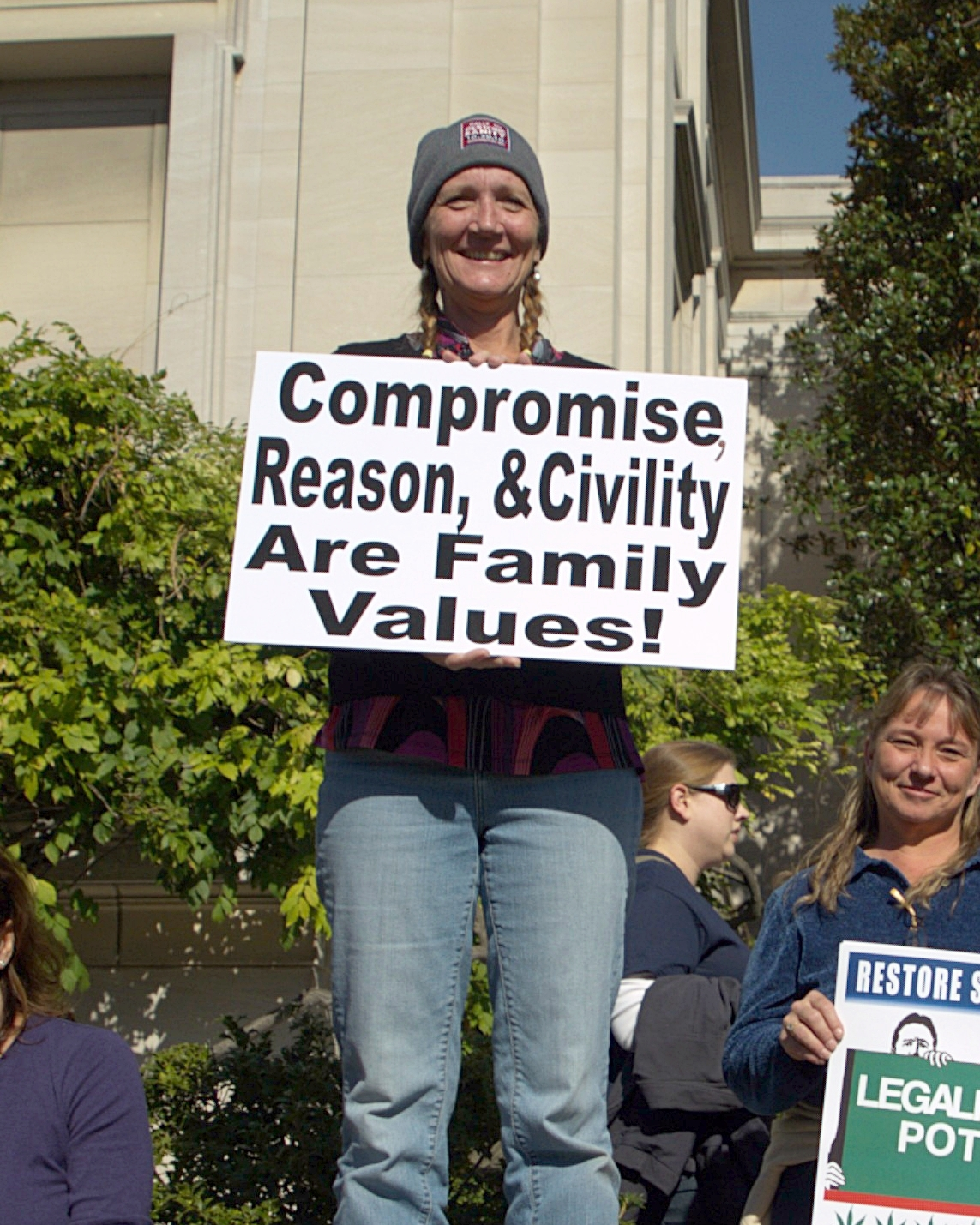
A woman at the Rally to Restore Sanity and/or Fear holding a sign that declares her ideas of family values

==== Demographics ====
Population studies have found that in 2004 and 2008, liberal-voting ("blue") states have lower rates of divorce and teenage pregnancy than conservative-voting ("red") states. June Carbone, author of Red Families vs. Blue Families, opines that the driving factor is that people in liberal states tend to wait longer before getting married.

A 2002 government survey found that 95% of adult Americans had premarital sex. This number had risen slightly from the 1950s, when it was nearly 90%. The median age of first premarital sex has dropped in that time from 20.4 to 17.6.

==== Christian right ====
The Christian right often promotes the term family values to refer to their version of familialism.

Focus on the Family is an American Christian conservative organization whose family values include adoption by married, opposite-sex parents; and traditional gender roles. It opposes abortion, divorce, LGBT rights, particularly LGBT adoption and same-sex marriage, pornography, masturbation, and pre-marital sex. The Family Research Council is an example of a right-wing organization claiming to uphold traditional family values. Due to its usage of virulent anti-gay rhetoric and opposition to civil rights for LGBT people, it was classified as a hate group.

== See also ==
- Nepotism, favoritism granted to relatives and friends without regard to merit
- Nuclear family, a family group consisting of a pair of adults and their children
- Natalism, a belief that promotes human reproduction
- Extended family
- Single parent
- Family Party of Germany
- League of Polish Families
- Nepal Pariwar Dal
- New Reform Party of Ontario, founded as Family Coalition Party of Ontario
- Party for Japanese Kokoro
- Scottish Family Party
- The People of the Family
- We Are Family (Slovakia)
- World Congress of Families
