= Culturalist psychoanalysts =

Some psychoanalysts have been labeled culturalist, or belonging to the cultural school, because of the prominence they gave on culture for the genesis of behavior. The most prominent culturalist psychoanalyst was maybe Erich Fromm, and after him Karen Horney and Harry Stack Sullivan.

They were famously in conflict with orthodox psychoanalysts. Despite their differences with orthodox psychoanalysts, they had a "stubborn maintenance of a familialist perspective," still speaking "the same language of a familialized social realm".
