= Christian amendment =

Proposed constitutional amendments

Christian amendment describes any of several attempts to amend a country's constitution in order to officially make it a Christian state.

In the United States, the most significant attempt to amend the United States Constitution by inserting explicitly Christian ideas and language began during the American Civil War and was spearheaded by the National Reform Association.

== Samoa ==
In June 2017, Samoa became a Christian state after Parliament passed a bill to amend its constitution; Article 1 of the Samoan Constitution states that "Samoa is a Christian nation founded on God the Father, the Son and the Holy Spirit".

== United States ==
=== Initial proposals ===
In February 1863, during the American Civil War, a coalition of eleven Protestant denominations from seven northern states gathered to discuss the state of the nation. Seeing the Civil War as God's punishment for the omission of God from the US Constitution, they discussed a proposed amendment to alter the wording of the Preamble to acknowledge God. The idea that civil governments derive their legitimacy from God, and Jesus in particular, was alleged to be based on Biblical passages such as Psalm 2 and Romans 13. The original draft of the amendment, by Pennsylvania attorney John Alexander, read:

We, the people of the United States recognizing the being and attributes of Almighty God, the Divine Authority of the Holy Scriptures, the law of God as the paramount rule, and Jesus, the Messiah, the Savior and Lord of all, in order to form a more perfect union, establish justice, insure domestic tranquillity, provide for ~~the common defense, promote~~ the general welfare, and secure the blessings of liberty to ourselves and to our posterity, do ordain and establish this Constitution for the United States of America. (insertions and ~~deletions~~ noted)

The Christian Amendment Movement was founded the next year and quickly renamed the "National Reform Association" with Alexander as its first president. They sent a memorial to Congress formally proposing the following amendment:

We, the people of the United States, humbly acknowledging Almighty God as the source of all authority and power in civil government, the Lord Jesus Christ as the Ruler among the nations, His revealed will as the supreme law of the land, in order to constitute a Christian government, and in order to form a more perfect union, establish justice, insure domestic tranquillity, provide for the common defense, promote the general welfare, and secure the inalienable rights and the blessings of life, liberty, and the pursuit of happiness to ourselves ~~and~~ our posterity, and all the people, do ordain and establish this Constitution for the United States of America.

A delegation from the National Reform Association sought to meet with Abraham Lincoln on February 11, 1864, to solicit his endorsement of the amendment. Lincoln's pastor, Rev. Phineas Gurley, arranged for Lincoln to meet the delegation. After hearing their petition, Lincoln responded:

The general aspect of your movement I cordially approve. In regard to particulars I must ask time to deliberate, as the work of amending the Constitution should not be done hastily. I will carefully examine your paper in order more fully to comprehend its contents than is possible from merely hearing it read, and will take such action upon it as my responsibility to our Maker and our country demands.

The proposal was supported by Senators Charles Sumner, B. Gratz Brown and John Sherman, but did not come to a vote in Congress. One member of the National Reform Association, James Pollock, played a role in getting the phrase "In God We Trust" on the two-cent coin in 1864.

Another version of the amendment read:

We the people of the United States, humbly acknowledging Almighty God as the source of all authority and power in civil government, the Lord Jesus Christ as the Governor among the nations, and His revealed will as our supreme authority, in order to constitute a Christian government, to form a more perfect union, ... do ordain and establish this Constitution for the United States of America. (ellipses as given in source)

Similar proposals were considered by Congress in 1874, 1895, 1896, 1910, 1947, 1949, 1951, 1953, 1955, 1956, 1957, 1959, 1961, 1963, 1965, 1967, and 1969 but none passed.

=== Later attempts ===
With the growing backlash in American society against communism in the 1940s and 1950s, new efforts were made to introduce Christianity into the Constitution, although these efforts were now in the form of standard constitutional amendments. In 1954 Vermont Senator Ralph Flanders proposed:

Section 1: This nation devoutly recognizes the authority and law of Jesus Christ, Savior and Ruler of nations, through whom are bestowed the blessings of Almighty God.
Section 2: This amendment shall not be interpreted so as to result in the establishment of any particular ecclesiastical organization, or in the abridgment of the rights of religious freedom, or freedom of speech and press, or of peaceful assemblage.
Section 3: Congress shall have power, in such cases as it may deem proper, to provide a suitable oath or affirmation for citizens whose religious scruples prevent them from giving unqualified allegiance to the Constitution as herein amended.

None of the proposals came to a congressional vote.

There were calls for similar amendments in the wake of the 1962 Supreme Court case Engel v. Vitale, which ruled school-sponsored and dictated prayer in schools unconstitutional. Over 200 similar amendment proposals were introduced to Congress between 1894 and 1984.

== See also ==
- Accommodationism
- Christian democracy
- Church of the Holy Trinity v. United States
- Constitutional references to God
- Establishment Clause of the First Amendment
- Religious pluralism
