= The Bible and Its Influence =

American textbook

Front cover art for the book The Bible and Its Influence.

The Bible and Its Influence is a textbook first published in 2005 to facilitate teaching about the Bible in American public high schools. Its publishers, the Bible Literacy Project, say the textbook allows schools to study the Bible academically while fully respecting the Establishment Clause of the First Amendment. It is designed for teaching either a semester course or a full-year course on the literary and historical influence of the Bible.

The development took over five years, at a cost of $2 million, with contributions from 40 Eastern Orthodox, evangelical, Protestant, Roman Catholic, Jewish and secular experts and scholars.

== Use in public schools ==
As of September 2010, the Bible Literacy Project reports that the textbook has been adopted by 470 schools in 43 states, with more than 100 schools in Texas teaching Bible literacy courses. On October 11, 2007, The Bible and Its Influence was designated by the Alabama State Board of Education as an approved textbook statewide. This designation allows schools throughout the state to purchase the curriculum with state funds.

== Media commentary ==
The Bible and Its Influence has received extensive press coverage. The cover story of TIME on April 2, 2007, described the rising trend in Bible courses in public schools nationwide. TIME senior religion editor David Van Biema stated, "Public school Bible electives should have a strong accompanying textbook on the model of The Bible and Its Influence, but one that is willing to deal a bit more bluntly with the historical warts."

In May 2007, The Bible and Its Influence was also featured in Education Week and on NBC's Today show. The New York State School Boards Association's On Board magazine also had favorable coverage of The Bible and Its Influence, calling it "a remarkable textbook" in a July 31, 2006, review.

== Authors ==
Co-author Chuck P. Stetson, Jr. is a Christian evangelical educational political activist. Stetson serves as chairman of the Bible Literacy Project, an organization which Americans United for Separation of Church and State has argued strives to introduce Christian beliefs into the American public school system. Stetson was also long affiliated with Charles Colson.

== See also ==
- Religious literacy
