= Religious literacy =

Ability to understand religion

Religious literacy (faith literacy) is the knowledge of, and ability to understand, religion. There has been an ongoing reflection on what counts as literacy. In particular, there is the increasing recognition that literacy is more than a cognitive skill and not only about decoding and processing information. Thus, religious literacy is not just about the ability to navigate a terrain or domain effectively – it is not just a skill – but also entails an awareness of what one is doing when navigating such a domain. Being literate is not just about the ability to 'do' but includes an understanding of what one is doing. The importance of being religiously literate is increasing as globalisation has created greater links and migration between societies of different faiths and cultures. It has been proposed that including religious literacy as an aspect of public education would improve social cohesion. In addition to being familiar with and comprehending the nature of religious experience, religious literacy is a fundamental understanding of the complexities, contradictions, and difficulties of at least one religious tradition. Religious literacy is necessary in contemporary society not to understand religions in isolation, but rather to foster mutual understanding. It embraces diversity and promotes balanced and wise engagement with the religious aspects of human cultures.

Religious literacy is important for fostering understanding both between religious groups, as well as in relations between non-faith communities and faith-based communities. It aims to empower an individual to go beyond the ability to decode and understand the meanings of religious practices and beliefs in order to take action over the social order implied in messages about religion.

A pioneer in the religious literacy field is the Religion Communicators Council (RCC), founded in 1929, the association is a network of esteemed communications experts who work for and within a diverse group of faith-based organisations. RCC's work aims to “advance religious literacy”.

Beginning with the 2015 RCC Convention in Alexandria, Virginia, US, religious literacy will be a top priority for the association. Religious communicators are aware of the consequences that can arise when the general public and the media are unable to comprehend the cultural and religious nuances of current events that are taking place in our world today. Conflicts are exacerbated by a lack of awareness of the fundamental beliefs held by various religions around the world. RCC has a role to play as the only faith-oriented accredited public relations association. Its interfaith members help the secular media understand diverse faith dynamics and provides members with resources to help them understand other faith traditions.

== Definition ==
The term religious literacy refers to a fundamental comprehension of the practices, beliefs, and institutions of various global religious traditions. The religiously literate person has a basic understanding of the central texts, beliefs, practices, and modern manifestations of several world religions.

The American Academy of Religion uses the definition offered by Diane L. Moore, asserting that religious literacy constitutes the ability of discerning and analysing “fundamental intersections of religion and social/political/cultural life through multiple lenses”. This involves comprehension of religious history, literature/holy texts, core beliefs, practices and how these are manifested in the contemporary world. In addition, religious literacy also means the capacity to contextualise political, social and cultural aspects of religion across time and space. Fundamental to this understanding is the intersection between these key elements.

As religious literacy is a relatively new concept and the issues at hand are in constant flux, there is no universally agreed definition. However, the definition presented reflects on the terminology used in universities, as well as in the field of government policymaking.

=== Ability of religious literacy ===
Religious literacy requires the ability to discern and analyze the fundamental intersection of religion and social/political/cultural life through multiple perspectives. More specifically, religious literacy requires a fundamental comprehension of the major texts, beliefs, practices, and contemporary manifestations of several of the world's religious traditions, as well as their history. It is also necessary to be able to identify and investigate the religious aspect of political, social, and cultural expressions across time and space. Religious literacy requires an understanding of the history and influence of a religion—or multiple religions—both on the surface of a society and within their cultural phenomena. Religious literacy is a set of skills that enables one to interact meaningfully with religious people and events without falling into some of the pitfalls that frequently hinder comprehension. The religiously literate person resists lumping people together and encourages a mindset that is open and sympathetic to religion without being apologetic or doctrinal. Instead, it looks first at the individual and the community to understand how they experience and express their religion.

=== The four key elements of religious literacy ===
Religious literacy consists of four main elements:

1. A basic level of knowledge about beliefs, practices and traditions of the main religious traditions present in a country, and of the shape of the changing religious landscape.
2. An awareness of how beliefs, traditions, and interpretations are transformed into actions, practices, and daily lives of individuals.
3. A critical awareness, enabling the individual to recognise and analyse religious stereotypes.
4. The ability to engage with diverse religious groups in a respectful manner that promotes respect and plurality and consequently leads to effective communication.

=== Different approaches to religious literacy ===
In the past three decades, religious literacy is a concept that has been discussed and debated more and more in the context of religious education and policy making. Due to the political nature of the concept, there exists different visions on what exactly religious literacy entails.

Religious education specialist Andrew Wright sees religious literacy as the ability to reflect, communicate and act in an informed, intelligent and sensitive manner towards the phenomenon of religion. He argues that children should be educated to critically engage with truth claims made by religious traditions.

A second vision on religious literacy comes from researchers Prothero and Moore, who see it as a subset of cultural literacy. For Prothero, religious literacy is the ability to understand and use the basic building blocks of religious traditions – their terms, symbols, doctrines, practices, sayings, characters, metaphors, and narratives. Moore defines religious literacy as entailing the ability to discern and analyse the fundamental intersections of religion and social, political, cultural life through multiple lenses.

A third vision is developed by scholar of religion Adam Dinham, who argues that in a multi-religious, multi-faith, multi-cultural and post-secular society, it is important that people have sufficient knowledge of religion in order to act and interact well. Religious literacy is then seen as the ability to recognise and understand a variety of public practices and settings in the real world to help understand the world.

=== Limitations of religious literacy ===
While religious literacy is often promoted as a means of fostering inclusivity, scholars such as Justine Ellis have demonstrated that, in practice, it can instead reinforce exclusionary understandings of the category of religion. The concept has often been uncritically employed in both academic and popular discourses and has been criticised for advancing essentialist definitions of the category of religion. Advocacy for religious literacy has tended to emphasise the literal aspects of the concept, prioritising its rational, textual and cognitive dimensions. Moreover, proponents of religious literacy frequently highlight its potential to enhance critical thinking, individual autonomy and democratic discourses. This understanding of religion is heavily influenced by the pervasive reason – emotion binary, which contributes to the exclusion of affective and embodied experiences. This binary further reinforces the perception that specific manifestations of religion are conducive for liberal democracy, whereas others are not. In this way the advocacy for religious literacy can influence attitudes, emotions, and behaviours under the guise of promoting social cohesion, and it is necessary to consider what kind of categories are employed within discourses of religious literacy.

== United Kingdom ==
In the United Kingdom, there are institutes and consultancies being set up that offer religious understanding training for the public and private sectors. Even the government is also committed to a program of faith literacy in the public sector. This is aimed to be significantly enhance organizational multiplicity among other things. Faith literacy is also intended to facilitate a move beyond the functional levels of conversation. World Bank in its 2007 publication highlighted the need to build up the values and mechanisms for faith literacy among development institutions. The subject of faith literacy is at the centre of debates, challenges, plans and practices of faith in the public sphere.

Tony Blair, former British Prime Minister, also mentioned in an interview that he reads Quran and Bible every day since it is crucial to be faith literate in a globalised world like ours. In Uganda, the Bishop of Kigezi also urged the government patrons to be more ‘faith literate’. Realizing the importance of this concept, the Economic and Social Research Council in UK started a three-year research paper in faith literacy.

== See also ==
- Comparative religion
- Religious tolerance
