= Accommodationism =

Philosophical and legal view accepting both religious and rationalist/irreligious views

In law and philosophy, accommodationism is the cooperation between government and religious institutions. Underlying accommodationism is the idea that "government and religion are compatible and necessary to a well-ordered society." Accommodationist policies are common in liberal democracies as a method of guaranteeing freedom of religion, and these policies may include options for religious education, official recognition of certain religious practices, and tolerance of religious expression in public spaces. It contrasts with separationist secularism and fundamentalism.

== By location ==
=== Europe ===
Germany provides financial support for religious organizations. Teaching of religion is permitted in schools, but students have the right to choose the type of religious instruction, if any. In Albania, accommodationism is associated with long standing Islamic traditions in the country and Sufism in particular, while it's opposed by neo-fundamentalist groups and the Salafi movement in particular.

In the United Kingdom, accommodationism is relevant to the role of the Church of England and the debate over disestablishmentarianism.

=== India ===
India adopted accommodationism in its Constitution in 1947, supported by secularists such as Mahatma Gandhi, Jawaharlal Nehru, and B. R. Ambedkar. The government administrates religious instruction in private schools, funds religious organizations the same way as other NGOs, and does not regulate religious activity unless it contradicts the constitution. Muslims are not strictly bound by the law of India and are permitted to operate separately under a Sharia system for civil issues.

=== United States ===
Accommodationist jurisprudence in the United States began with Zorach v. Clauson (1952). In the United States, it often pertains to religion in schools; public schools in the United States cannot sponsor or endorse religion, but parochial schools are permitted to exist and their students may receive government aid if the benefit to religious activities is indirect or incidental. Religious practices have been recognized and adopted by law, including Christmas as a federal holiday since 1870 (at first applicable only to federal employees in the District of Columbia, extended in 1885 to all federal employees) and In God We Trust as the national motto since 1956. The Supreme Court of the United States has ruled in favor of an accommodationist interpretation of the religion clauses of the First Amendment multiple times, both implicitly and explicitly.

== See also ==
- Faith and rationality
- Religion in politics
- Religious pluralism
- Separation of church and state
- Syncretism
