= 2008 California Proposition 8 =

Successful referendum on banning same-sex marriage

Proposition 8
- November 4, 2008
- Eliminates Right of Same-Sex Couples to Marry. Initiative Constitutional Amendment. Changes California Constitution to eliminate the right of same-sex couples to marry. Provides that only marriage between a man and a woman is valid or recognized in California. Fiscal Impact: Over next few years, potential revenue loss, mainly sales taxes, totaling in the several tens of millions of dollars, to state and local governments. In the long run, likely little fiscal impact on state and local governments.

Results
Choice	Votes	%
Yes	7,001,084	52.24%
No	6,401,482	47.76%
Valid votes	13,402,566	97.52%
Invalid or blank votes	340,611	2.48%
Total votes	13,743,177	100.00%
Registered voters/turnout	17,304,091	79.42%

Yes
90%–100%
80%–90%
70%–80%
60%–70%
50%–60%
No
90%–100%
80%–90%
70%–80%
60%–70%
50%–60%

Proposition 8 was a California ballot proposition and a state constitutional amendment intended to ban same-sex marriage. It passed in the November 2008 California state elections and was later overturned by the courts and by Proposition 3, which was passed by voters in November 2024. The proposition was created by opponents of same-sex marriage in advance of the California Supreme Court's May 2008 appeal ruling, In re Marriage Cases, which found the ban in 2000 on same-sex marriage (Proposition 22) unconstitutional. Proposition 8 was ultimately ruled unconstitutional in 2010 by a federal court on different grounds, although the ruling did not go into effect until June 26, 2013, following the conclusion of appeals.

Proposition 8 countermanded the May 2008 ruling by adding Proposition 22 wording as an amendment to the California Constitution, providing that "only marriage between a man and a woman is valid or recognized in California". It was ruled constitutional by the California Supreme Court in Strauss v. Horton in 2009, on the grounds that it "carved out a limited [or 'narrow'] exception to the state equal protection clause"; in his dissent, Justice Carlos R. Moreno wrote that exceptions to the Equal Protection Clause could not be made by any majority, since its whole purpose was to protect minorities against the will of a majority.

Legal challenges to Prop 8 were presented quickly after its approval. Following affirmation of Prop 8 by the state courts, two same-sex couples filed a lawsuit in the United States District Court for the Northern District of California in the case Perry v. Schwarzenegger (later Hollingsworth v. Perry). In August 2010, Chief Judge Vaughn Walker ruled that Prop 8 was unconstitutional under both the Due Process and Equal Protection Clauses of the U.S. Fourteenth Amendment, since Prop 8 purported to re-remove rights from a disfavored class only, with no rational basis. The official proponents' justifications for Prop 8 were analyzed in over fifty pages covering eighty findings of fact. The state government supported the ruling and refused to defend Prop 8. The ruling was stayed, pending appeal by the proponents of Prop 8. On February 7, 2012, the Ninth Circuit Court of Appeals, in a 2–1 decision, reached the same conclusion as the district court, but on narrower grounds. The court ruled that it was unconstitutional for California to take marriage rights away from same-sex couples shortly after having granted them. The ruling was stayed pending appeal to the United States Supreme Court.

On June 26, 2013, the Supreme Court of the United States issued its decision on the appeal in the case Hollingsworth v. Perry, ruling that proponents of initiatives such as Prop 8 did not possess legal standing in their own right to defend the resulting law in federal court, either to the Supreme Court or (previously) to the Ninth Circuit Court of Appeals. Therefore, the Supreme Court vacated the decision of the Ninth Circuit, and remanded the case for further proceedings. The decision left the district court's 2010 ruling intact. On June 28, 2013, the Ninth Circuit, on remand, dismissed the appeal for lack of jurisdiction and dissolved their previous stay of the district court's ruling, enabling Governor Jerry Brown to order same-sex marriages to resume.

The passage of Prop 8 received widespread media coverage over its effect on the concurrent 2008 presidential and congressional elections, as well as the pre-election effects Prop 8 had on California's reputation as a historically LGBTQ-friendly state and the same-sex marriage debate that had started after same-sex marriage was legalized in Massachusetts through a 2004 court decision. After the results were certified and same-sex marriages ceased, supporters of Prop 8 were targeted by opponents with actions ranging from some opponents disclosing supporter donations and boycotting proponents' businesses, to others threatening supporters with death and vandalizing churches.

A ballot proposal to formally repeal Prop 8 from California's constitution, called Proposition 3, was passed by the California State Legislature in July 2023. The vote to formally repeal Prop 8 was passed by nearly 63% of voters in the 2024 election.

== Overview ==
In 2000, the State of California adopted Proposition 22 which, as an ordinary statute, forbade recognition or licensing of same-sex marriages in the state. During February and March 2004, San Francisco Mayor Gavin Newsom directed the licensing of same-sex marriages on the basis of the state's Equal Protection Clause, prompted also by recent events including George W. Bush's proposed constitutional ban, a possible legal case by Campaign for California Families (CCF), and a Supreme Court of Massachusetts ruling deeming same-sex marriage bans unconstitutional and permitting them from May 2004. While only lasting a month before being overruled, this was supported by other cities such as San Jose, gained global attention, and led to the case In re Marriage Cases, in which Proposition 22 was found (San Francisco County Superior Court, March 14, 2005) and confirmed upon appeal (California Supreme Court, May 15, 2008) to be unconstitutional.

Proposition 8 was created by opponents of same-sex marriage prior to the final ruling on In re Marriage Cases as a voter ballot initiative, and voted on at the time of the November 2008 elections. Its wording was precisely the same as Proposition 22, which as an ordinary statute, had been invalidated in 2008, but by re-positioning it as a state constitutional amendment rather than a legislative statute, it was able to circumvent the ruling from In re Marriage Cases. The proposition did not affect domestic partnerships in California, nor (following subsequent legal rulings) did it reverse same-sex marriages that had been performed during the interim period May to November 2008 (i.e. after In re Marriage Cases but before Proposition 8).

Proposition 8 came into immediate effect on November 5, 2008, the day after the elections. Demonstrations and protests occurred across the state and nation. Same-sex couples and government entities, including couples who had married before then, filed numerous lawsuits with the California Supreme Court challenging the proposition's validity and effect on previously administered same-sex marriages. In Strauss v. Horton, the California Supreme Court upheld Proposition 8, but allowed the existing same-sex marriages to stand (under the grandfather clause principle). (Justice Carlos R. Moreno dissented that exceptions to the equal protection clause could not be made by any majority since its whole purpose was to protect minorities against the will of a majority.)

Although upheld in state court, Proposition 8 was ruled unconstitutional by the federal courts. In Perry v. Schwarzenegger, United States District Court Judge Vaughn Walker overturned Proposition 8 on August 4, 2010, ruling that it violated both the Due Process and Equal Protection clauses of the U.S. Constitution. Walker issued a stay (injunction) against enforcing Proposition 8 and a stay to determine suspension of his ruling pending appeal. The State of California did not appeal the ruling (with which it had agreed anyway) leaving the initiative proponents and one county to seek an appeal.

On appeal, a Ninth Circuit Court of Appeals panel ruled the county had no right of appeal, and asked the California Supreme Court to rule whether the proponents of Prop 8 had the right to appeal (known as "standing") if the state did not do so. The California Supreme Court ruled that they did. The Ninth Circuit affirmed the federal district court's decision on February 7, 2012, but the stay remained in place as appeals continued to the U.S. Supreme Court, which heard oral arguments in the appeal Hollingsworth v. Perry on March 26, 2013. On June 26, 2013, the Supreme Court dismissed the appeal and ruled that the Ninth Circuit had erred in allowing the previous appeal, since in line with Article III of the Constitution and many prior cases unanimous on the point, being an initiative proponents is not enough by itself to have federal court standing or appeal a ruling in federal court. This left the original federal district court ruling against Proposition 8 as the outcome, and same sex marriages resumed almost immediately afterwards.

== History of the ballot initiative ==
In 2005, the site ProtectMarriage.com was created as the "Official website for the California Constitutional Marriage Amendment" and launched a campaign to pass a ballot proposition to constitutionally prohibit same-sex marriage. In 2007, ProtectMarriage.com tried and failed to get Initiative 1254, a proposed ballot proposition to constitutionally prohibit same-sex marriage on the 2008 California ballot.

On November 29, 2007, was the official summary date for California Marriage Protection, also called Limit On Marriage. Constitutional Amendment and numbered 07-0068 by the Attorney General of California and Initiative 1298 by California Secretary of State. In order to qualify for the ballot, a measure needed 694,354 petition signatures, an amount equal to 8 percent of the votes cast during the 2006 California gubernatorial election. In late April 2008, ProtectMarriage.com submitted a petition containing 1,120,801 signatures, which was 426,447 more signatures than was necessary to put the measure on the ballot. On June 2, 2008, California Secretary of State Debra Bowen said a random sample check of signatures submitted by the measure's sponsors showed that they had gathered enough names to qualify and certified it as the eighth initiative for the November 4, 2008, general election ballot.

Proposition 8 (ballot title: Eliminates Rights of Same-Sex Couples to Marry. Initiative Constitutional Amendment; originally titled the "California Marriage Protection Act") was a California ballot proposition that changed the California Constitution to add a new section 7.5 to Article I, which reads: "Only marriage between a man and a woman is valid or recognized in California." This change restricted the definition of marriage to opposite-sex couples, and eliminated same-sex couples' right to marry, thereby overriding portions of the ruling of In re Marriage Cases by "carving out an exception to the preexisting scope of the privacy and due process clauses" of the state constitution.

=== Full text ===
Proposition 8 consisted of two sections. Its full text was:

SECTION 1. Title

This measure shall be known and may be cited as the "California Marriage Protection Act."

SECTION 2. Article I, Section 7.5 is added to the California Constitution, to read:

Sec. 7.5. Only marriage between a man and a woman is valid or recognized in California.

=== Pre-election legal challenges ===
==== Petition to remove proposition from ballot ====
On July 16, 2008, the California Supreme Court denied a petition calling for the removal of Proposition 8 from the November ballot. The petition asserted the proposition should not be on the ballot on the grounds it was a constitutional revision that only the legislature or a constitutional convention could place before voters. Opponents also argued that the petitions circulated to qualify the measure for the ballot inaccurately summarized its effect. The court denied the petition without comment. As a general rule, it is improper for courts to adjudicate pre-election challenges to a measure's substantive validity. The question of whether Proposition 8 is a constitutional amendment or constitutional revision was ruled on by the California Supreme Court on May 26, 2009, and found that it was not a revision and therefore would be upheld. They also declared that the same-sex marriages performed prior to the passing of Prop 8 would remain valid.

==== Challenge to title and summary ====
The measure was titled: "Eliminates Rights of Same-Sex Couples to Marry. Initiative Constitutional Amendment." The ballot summary read that the measure "changes the California Constitution to eliminate the right of same-sex couples to marry in California."

Proponents of the measure objected to the wording of the ballot title and summary on the grounds that they were argumentative and prejudicial. The resulting legal petition Jansson v. Bowen was dismissed August 7, 2008, by California Superior Court Judge Timothy M. Frawley, who ruled that "the title and summary includes an essentially verbatim recital of the text of the measure itself", and that the change was valid because the measure did, in fact, eliminate a right upheld by the California Supreme Court.

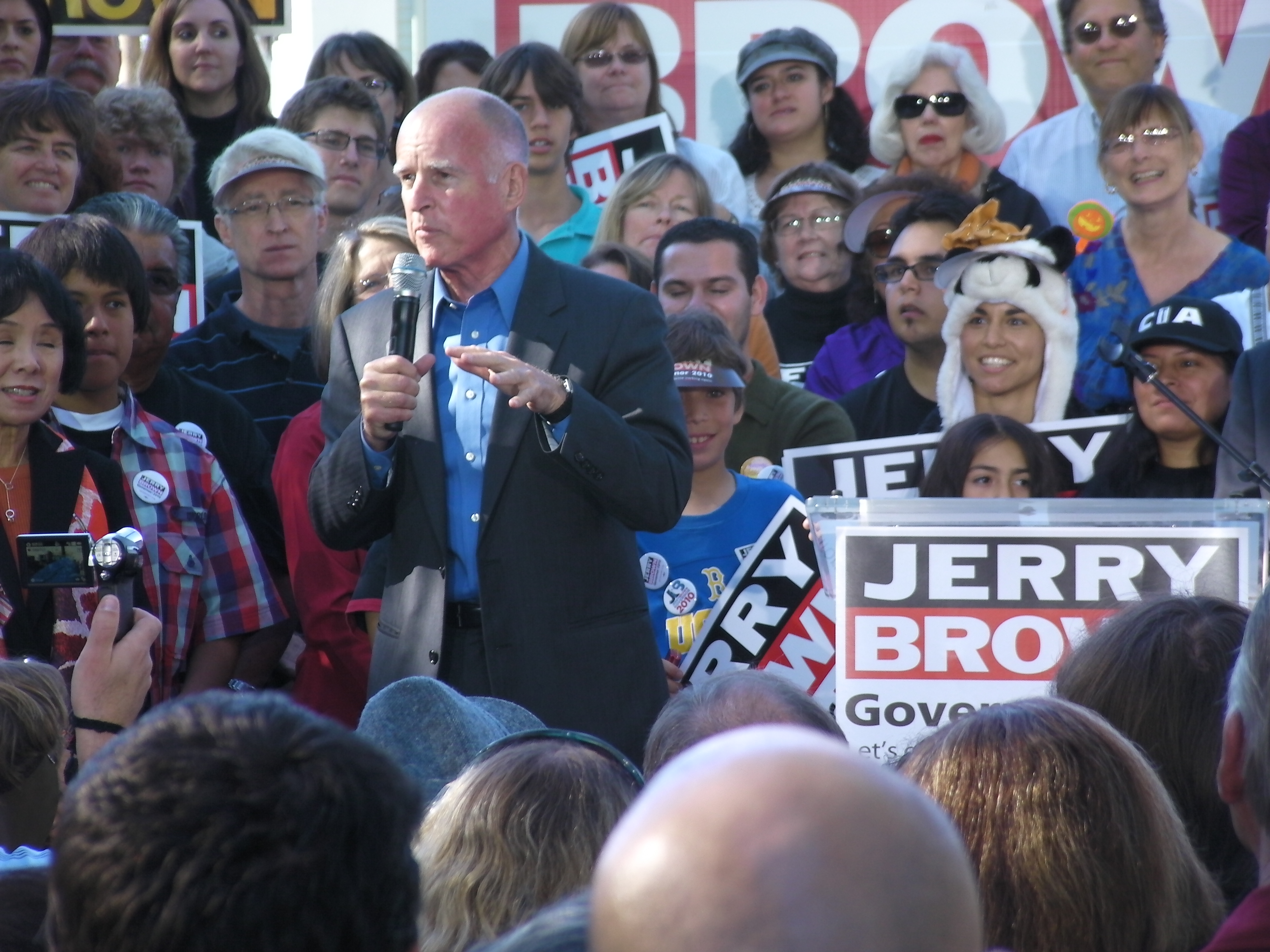
As California State Attorney General, Jerry Brown (shown here campaigning for governor in 2010) had the ballot's description and title changed from "Limit on Marriage" to "Eliminates the right of same-sex couples to marry".

California Attorney General Jerry Brown explained that the changes were required to more "accurately reflect the measure" in light of the California Supreme Court's intervening In re Marriage Cases decision.

On July 22, 2008, Proposition 8 supporters mounted a legal challenge to the revised ballot title and summary, contending that Attorney General Brown inserted "language [...] so inflammatory that it will unduly prejudice voters against the measure". Supporters claimed that research showed that an attorney general had never used an active verb like "eliminates" in the title of a ballot measure in the past fifty years in which ballot measures have been used. Representatives of the attorney general produced twelve examples of ballot measures using the word "eliminates" and vouched for the neutrality and accuracy of the ballot language.

On August 8, 2008, the California Superior Court turned down the legal challenge, affirming the new title and summary, stating, "the title and summary is not false or misleading because it states that Proposition 8 would 'eliminate the right of same-sex couples to marry' in California." The Superior Court based their decision on the previous Marriages Cases ruling in which the California Supreme Court held that same-sex couples have a constitutional right to marry under the California Constitution. That same day, proponents of Prop. 8 filed an emergency appeal with the state appeals court. The Court of Appeal denied their petition later that day and supporters did not seek a review by the Supreme Court of California. The deadline for court action on the wording of ballot summaries and arguments in the voter pamphlet was August 11, 2008.

While turning down the challenge to the title and summary, the California Superior Court also found that the Yes on 8 campaign had overstated its ballot argument on the measure's impact on public schools and ordered a minor change in wording. The original arguments included a claim that the Supreme Court's legalization of same-sex marriage requires teachers to tell their students, as young as kindergarten age, that same-sex marriage is the same as opposite-sex marriage. The court said the Yes on 8 argument was false because instruction on marriage is not required and parents can withdraw their children. The court said the ballot argument could be preserved by rewording it to state that teachers "may" or "could" be required to tell children there is no difference between same-sex and opposite-sex marriage.

== Campaign ==
=== Campaign funding and spending ===
The pro- and anti-Prop 8 campaigns spent a combined $106 million on the campaign. This was not the most expensive California ballot proposition that year, however; the 2008 campaigns for and against Propositions 94, 95, 96, and 97, dealing with the expansion of Native American gambling, surpassed Prop 8, with combined expenditures of $172 million.

By election day, volunteers on both sides spent thousands of hours getting their messages across to the state's 17.3 million registered voters. The campaigns for and against Proposition 8 raised $39.0 million ($11.3 million or 29.1% from outside California) and $44.1 million ($13.2 million or 30.0% from outside California), respectively, from over 64,000 people in all 50 states and more than 20 foreign countries, setting a new record nationally for a social policy initiative and more than for every other race in the country in spending except the presidential contest. Contributions were much greater than those of previous same-sex marriage initiatives. Between 2004 and 2006, 22 such measures were on ballots around the country, and donations to all of them combined totaled $31.4 million, according to OpenSecrets. A ProtectMarriage.com spokeswoman estimated that 36 companies which had previously contributed to Equality California were targeted to receive a letter requesting similar donations to ProtectMarriage.com.

The California Fair Political Practices Commission fined the LDS Church in 2010 for failing to follow campaign disclosure policies during the last two weeks leading up to the election, which amounted to $37,000 in non-monetary contributions. They were fined $5,538.

Both proponents and opponents of Proposition 8 made significant use of online tactics for campaigning. For example, over 800 videos were posted on YouTube, most consisting of original content and most taking a position against the Proposition. A greater proportion of 'Yes on 8' videos were scripted and professionally produced. Many 'No on 8' videos recorded demonstrations in the aftermath of the election.

=== Proponents ===
Official ProtectMarriage.com "Yes on 8" campaign sign

Proponents of the constitutional amendment argued that exclusively heterosexual marriage was "an essential institution of society", that leaving the constitution unchanged would "result in public schools teaching our kids that gay marriage is okay", and that gay people "do not have the right to redefine marriage for everyone else".

The ProtectMarriage.com organization sponsored the initiative that placed Proposition 8 on the ballot and continues to support the measure. The measure also attracted the support of a number of political figures and religious organizations.

==== Political figures ====
Republican presidential nominee and U.S. Senator John McCain released a statement of support for the proposed constitutional amendment. Former Speaker of the House Newt Gingrich released a video in support. Both characterized the court ruling requiring recognition of same sex marriage as being against the will of the people. A political action committee run by former Massachusetts governor Mitt Romney, who personally supported the proposition, donated $10,000 to the National Organization for Marriage during their campaign for the proposition.

==== Religious organizations ====
The Roman Catholic Church, as well as a Roman Catholic lay fraternal organization, the Knights of Columbus, firmly supported the measure. The bishops of the California Catholic Conference released a statement supporting the proposition, a position met with mixed reactions among church members, including clergy.

George Hugh Niederauer as Archbishop of San Francisco campaigned in 2008 in favor of the Proposition, and claimed to have been instrumental in forging alliances between Catholics and Mormons to support the measure. His successor, Salvatore Cordileone was regarded as instrumental in devising the initiative. Campaign finance records show he personally gave at least $6,000 to back the voter-approved ban and was instrumental in raising $1.5 million to put the proposition on the ballot. Subsequently, as archbishop of San Francisco, he has called publicly for an amendment to the US Constitution as "the only remedy in law against judicial activism" following the number of state same-sex marriage bans struck down by federal judges. He also attended and addressed the audience at the "March for Marriage", a rally opposing marriage for same-sex couples, in Washington, D.C., in June 2014.

In California's 2008 election, the Knights of Columbus attracted media attention when they donated more than $1.4 million to Proposition 8. The Order was the largest financial supporter of the successful effort to maintain a legal definition of marriage as the union of one man and one woman.

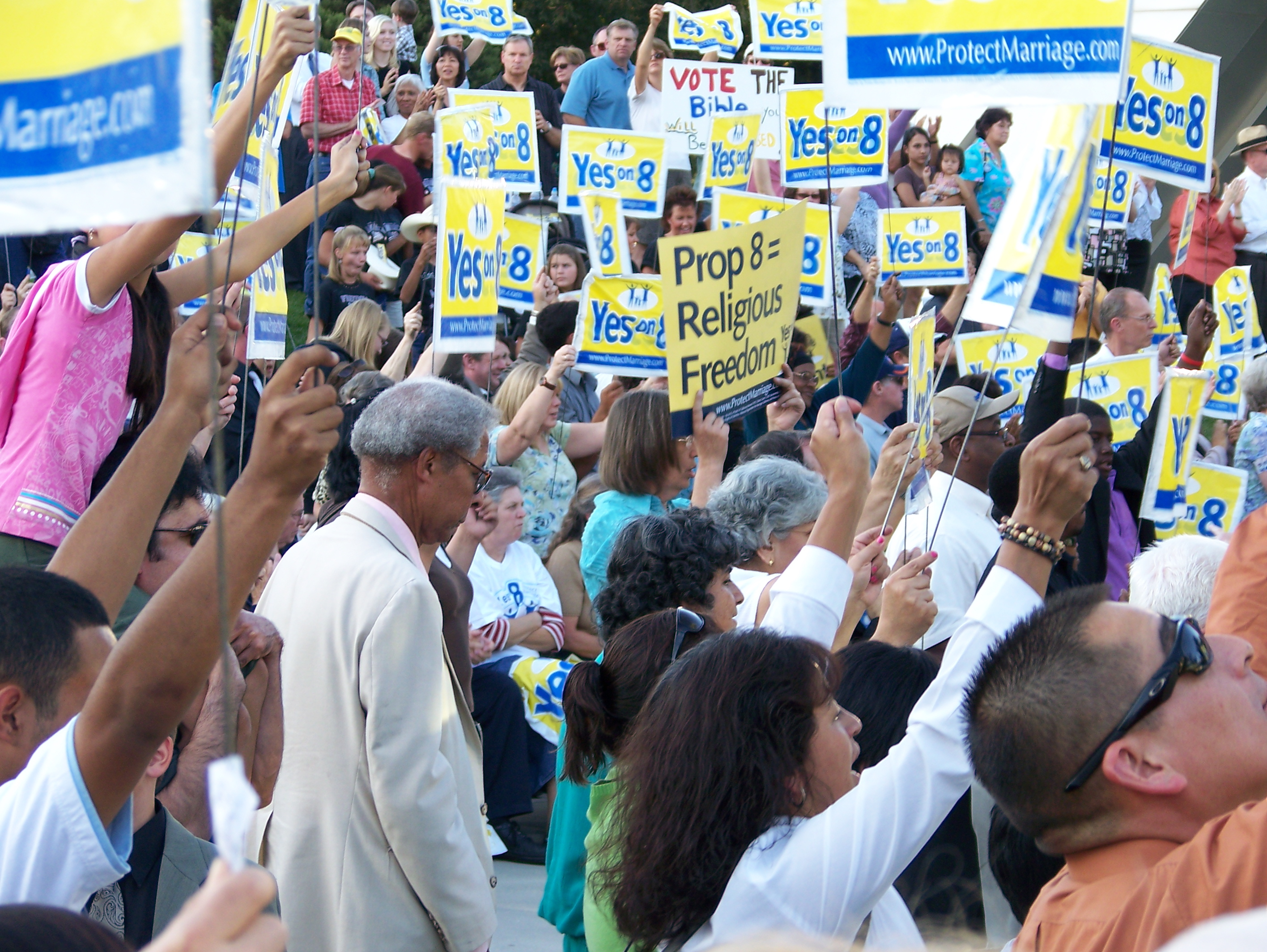
Rally for Yes on Prop 8 in Fresno

The Church of Jesus Christ of Latter-day Saints (LDS Church) also publicly supported the proposition. The First Presidency of the church announced its support for Proposition 8 in a letter intended to be read in every congregation in California. In this letter, church members were encouraged to "do all you can to support the proposed constitutional amendment by donating of your means and time". The church produced and broadcast to its congregations a program describing the support of the Proposition, and describing the timeline it proposes for what it describes as grassroots efforts to support the Proposition. Local church leaders set organizational and monetary goals for their membership—sometimes quite specific—to fulfill this call. The response of church members to their leadership's appeals to donate money and volunteer time was very supportive, such that Latter-day Saints provided a significant source for financial donations in support of the proposition, both inside and outside the State of California. LDS members contributed over $20 million, about 45% of out-of-state contributions to ProtectMarriage.com came from Utah, over three times more than any other state. ProtectMarriage, the official proponent of Proposition 8, estimates that about half the donations they received came from Mormon sources, and that LDS church members made up somewhere between 80% and 90% of the volunteers for early door-to-door canvassing.

Other religious organizations that supported Proposition 8 include the Union of Orthodox Jewish Congregations of America, Eastern Orthodox Church, a group of Evangelical Christians led by Jim Garlow and Miles McPherson, American Family Association, Focus on the Family and the National Organization for Marriage. Rick Warren, pastor of Saddleback Church, also endorsed the measure.

==== Others ====
The Grossmont Union High School District in San Diego County, California, publicly voted on a resolution endorsing Proposition 8. The Governing Board voted 4–0 to endorse the amendment of the California State Constitution.

The Asian Heritage Coalition held a rally in support of Proposition 8 in downtown San Diego on October 19, 2008.

During the November 2008 election campaign, Porterville's City Council was the only City Council in California that passed a Resolution in favor of Proposition 8.

==== Church of Scientology ====
The San Diego branch of the Church of Scientology publicly supported the proposition by signing an online petition asking for Prop 8. This led to award-winning director, producer and writer Paul Haggis to call on Tommy Davis to denounce the signature.

Davis responded to Haggis and told him that it was a single member of the San Diego branch which had signed the petition using the branch name and not a branch decision. Davis then stated that the man had been "handled."

Haggis spent ten months trying to get Scientology to publicly denounce Prop 8, but Scientology remained silent and later said "Davis explained to Haggis that the church avoids taking overt political stands." going further to explain that because they are a non-profit with tax exempt status, they cannot take a political stance or risk losing that status.

Haggis resigned from Scientology after thirty-five years of membership and wrote in his resignation letter that "public sponsorship of Proposition 8, which succeeded in taking away the civil rights of gay and lesbian citizens of California—rights that were granted them by the Supreme Court of our state—is a stain on the integrity of our organization and a stain on us personally. Our public association with that hate-filled legislation shames us."

==== "Whether You Like It or Not" advertisement ====
In the months leading up to Election Day, Proposition 8 supporters released a commercial featuring San Francisco Mayor Gavin Newsom stating in a speech regarding same-sex marriage: "This door's wide open now. It's going to happen, whether you like it or not." Some observers noted that polls shifted in favor of Proposition 8 following the release of the commercial; this, in turn, led to much speculation about Newsom's unwitting role in the passage of the amendment.

=== Opponents ===
Official "Vote NO on Prop 8" logo

Opponents argued that "the freedom to marry is fundamental to our society", that the California constitution "should guarantee the same freedom and rights to everyone", and that the proposition "mandates one set of rules for gay and lesbian couples and another set for everyone else". They also argued that "equality under the law is a fundamental constitutional guarantee" (see Equal Protection Clause).

Equality for All was the lead organization opposed to Proposition 8. They also ran the NoOnProp8.com campaign. As with the measure's proponents, opponents of the measure also included a number of political figures and religious organizations. Some non-partisan organizations and corporations, as well as the editorial boards of many of the state's major newspapers, also opposed the measure.

==== Political figures ====
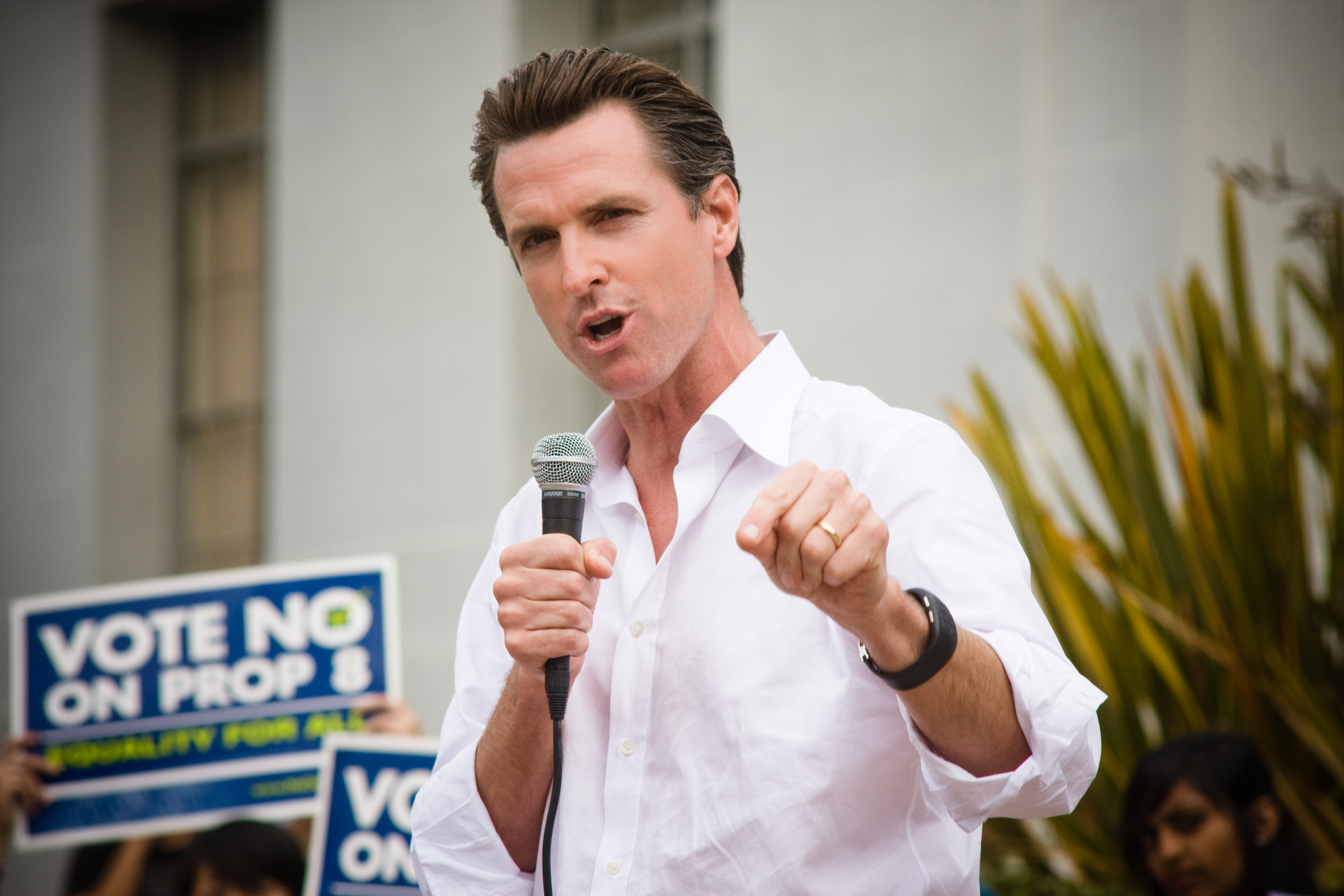
San Francisco Mayor Gavin Newsom speaking at an anti-Proposition 8 rally on the Sproul Plaza steps at UC Berkeley

Democratic presidential nominee and U.S. Senator Barack Obama stated that while he personally considered marriage to be between a man and woman, and supported civil unions that confer comparable rights rather than gay marriage, he opposed "divisive and discriminatory efforts to amend the California Constitution... the U.S. Constitution or those of other states". Democratic vice-presidential candidate Joseph Biden also opposed the proposition. Republican California Governor Arnold Schwarzenegger stated that although he opposed and twice vetoed legislative bills that would recognize same-sex marriage in California, he respected and would uphold the court's ruling and oppose the initiative and other attempts to amend the state's constitution. The U.S. House Speaker, California Representative (8th District), Nancy Pelosi along with other members of the California congressional delegation and both of California's U.S. senators, Dianne Feinstein and Barbara Boxer, voiced their opposition to Proposition 8. Also voicing their opposition were the Lieutenant Governor, State Controller John Chiang, former governor and Attorney General Jerry Brown, 42 of 80 members of the state assembly, half of the state senators, and the mayors of San Francisco, Los Angeles, and San Diego: Gavin Newsom, Antonio Villaraigosa, and Jerry Sanders, respectively.

==== Religious organizations ====
All six Episcopal diocesan bishops in California jointly issued a statement opposing Proposition 8 on September 10, 2008. Southern California's largest collection of rabbis, the Board of Rabbis of Southern California, voted to oppose Proposition 8. Other Jewish groups who opposed Proposition 8 include Jewish Mosaic, the American Jewish Committee, Progressive Jewish Alliance, National Council of Jewish Women, and the Anti-Defamation League (ADL). The ADL filed amicus briefs urging the Supreme Court of California, Ninth Circuit, and the Supreme Court to invalidate Prop 8. Los Angeles Jews were more opposed to Prop 8 than any other religious group or ethnic group in the city. Seventy-eight percent of surveyed Jewish Angelenos voted against the measure while only 8% supported the measure; the remainder declined to respond. The legislative ministry of the Unitarian Universalists opposed Proposition 8, and organized phone banks toward defeating the measure. They saw opposition to the proposition as a civil rights and social justice issue and their actions against it as a continuation of their previous works in civil rights.

In addition, the California Council of Churches urged the "immediate removal of Proposition 8"—saying that it infringes on the freedom of religion for churches who wish to bless same-sex unions.

==== Others ====
The League of Women Voters of California opposed Proposition 8 because "no person or group should suffer legal, economic or administrative discrimination". Additionally, all but two of the National Association for the Advancement of Colored People's local chapters in California and NAACP national chairman Julian Bond and President Benjamin Jealous opposed Proposition 8. Amnesty International also condemned Proposition 8, saying that "states should never withhold rights based on minority status".

A coalition of Silicon Valley executives urged a 'No' vote on Proposition 8. Google officially opposed Proposition 8 "as an issue of equality", and its founders donated $140,000 to the No on 8 campaign. Apple Inc. also opposed Proposition 8 as a "fundamental" civil rights issue, and donated $100,000 to the No on 8 campaign. Biotech leaders warned of potential damage to the state's $73 billion industry, citing Massachusetts as a top competitor for employees.

Many members of the entertainment industry were opposed to Proposition 8. Actor Tom Hanks, a strong supporter of same-sex marriage, was extremely outspoken about his opposition to the bill. Brad Pitt and Steven Spielberg each donated different amounts of money to the opposition campaign "No on 8". In 2010, the documentary film 8: The Mormon Proposition premiered to sell-out audiences at the Sundance Film Festival.

The Los Angeles Unified School District Board of Education voted unanimously for a resolution to oppose Proposition 8. The California Teachers Association donated one million dollars to fight Proposition 8. Chancellor Robert Birgeneau of UC Berkeley urged a vote against the measure, claiming a likely threat to California's academic competitiveness if Proposition 8 is passed.

==== Newspaper editorials ====
All ten of the state's largest newspapers editorialized against Proposition 8, including the Los Angeles Times, and the San Francisco Chronicle. Other papers which editorialized in opposition include The New York Times, La Opinión (Los Angeles), and The Bakersfield Californian.

=== Actions against supporters and opponents ===
After the election, a number of protests were held against the referendum's passing. These included candlelight vigils outside organizations such as LDS churches that promoted the proposition. Rallies against the amendment took place in California and across the country, with participants numbering in thousands.

Boycotts were also a feature of public response to the outcome of the election. LGBTQ rights groups published lists of donors to the Yes on 8 campaign and organized boycotts of individuals or organizations who had promoted or donated to it. Targets of the boycotts included the Sundance Film Festival in Utah, El Coyote Cafe, California Musical Theatre, and the Manchester Grand Hyatt Hotel.

Some supporters of Proposition 8 reported receiving death threats, some of which claimed to be "stemming from Prop 8". Some LDS churches were vandalized with spray paint.

Fresno-area supporters of gay marriage were also harassed; "No On 8" signs at the Clovis Unitarian Universalist Church were torn up, with Reverend Bryan Jessup alleging that his church experienced vandalism "every night". Santa Clara County Deputy District Attorney (DDA) Jay Boyarsky attributed a surge in anti-gay hate crimes, from 3 in 2007 to 14 in 2008, to controversy over Proposition 8.

== Pre-decision opinion polls ==
Various opinion polls were conducted to estimate the outcome of the proposition. Those margins with differences less than their margins of error are marked as "n.s.", meaning not significant (see statistical significance). Those margins considered statistically significant are indicated with the percentage points and the side favored in the poll, as either "pro" for in favor of the proposition's passage (e.g., 1% pro), or "con" for against its passage (e.g., 1% con).

According to the director of the Field Poll, the discrepancy between the pre-election polls and ballot results is because "regular church-goers ... were more prone than other voters to be influenced by last-minute appeals to conform to orthodox church positions when voting on a progressive social issue like same-sex marriage."

Date of opinion poll	Conducted by	Sample size (likely voters)	In favor	Against	Undecided	Margin	Margin of error
October 29–31, 2008	SurveyUSA	637	47%	50%	3%	n.s.	±4%
October 18–28, 2008	The Field Poll	966	44%	49%	7%	5% con	±3.3%
October 12–19, 2008	Public Policy Institute of California	1,186	44%	52%	4%	8% con	±3%
October 15–16, 2008	SurveyUSA	615	48%	45%	7%	n.s.	±4%
October 4–5, 2008	SurveyUSA	670	47%	42%	10%	5% pro	±3.9%
September 23–24, 2008	SurveyUSA	661	44%	49%	8%	5% con	±3.9%
September 9–16, 2008	Public Policy Institute of California	1,157	41%	55%	4%	14% con	±3%
September 5–14, 2008	The Field Poll	830	38%	55%	7%	17% con	±3.5%
August 12–19, 2008	Public Policy Institute of California	1,047	40%	54%	6%	14% con	±3%
July 8–14, 2008	The Field Poll	672	42%	51%	7%	9% con	±3.9%
May 17–26, 2008	The Field Poll	1,052	42%	51%	7%	9% con	±3.2%
May 22, 2008	Los Angeles Times/KTLA	705	54%	35%	11%	19% pro	±4%

== Results ==
County results: For 70%–80% 60%–70% 50%–60% / Against 70%–80% 60%–70% 50%–60%

Proposition 8
Choice	Votes	%
For	7,001,084	52.24
Against	6,401,482	47.76
Total	13,402,566	100.00
Valid votes	13,402,566	97.52
Invalid/blank votes	340,611	2.48
Total votes	13,743,177	100.00
Registered voters/turnout		79.42

Proposition 8 results (excluding invalid votes)
Yes; 7,001,084 (52.2%)	No; 6,401,482 (47.8%)
▲50%

A paper ballot with a vote cast against Prop 8

On the early morning hours of November 5, 2008, KGO-TV reported, with 92% of all precincts reporting, and The Associated Press (AP) reported, with 95% of all precincts reporting, that Proposition 8 had passed. According to the AP, some provisional and absentee ballots were yet to be counted, but based on trends and the locations of outstanding votes, Proposition 8's margin of support was secure.

Amending the California Constitution by voter initiative requires a simple majority to be enacted.

Edison/Mitofsky conducted an exit poll on behalf of the National Election Pool which is the only source of data on voter demographics in California in the 2008 election. The statistical trends from the exit poll of 2,240 voters suggested that an array of voters came out both in opposition to and in support of Proposition 8, with no single demographic group making up most of either the Yes or No vote. The National Election Pool poll showed that support for Proposition 8 was strong amongst African American voters, interviewed in the exit poll with 70% in favor, more than any other racial group. Their support was considered crucial to the proposition's passing, since African Americans made up an unusually larger percentage of voters that year, due to the presence of Barack Obama on the ballot. Polls by both the Associated Press and CNN mirrored this data, reporting support among black voters to be at 70% and 75%, respectively. A later study by the National Gay and Lesbian Task Force (NGLTF), examining the black vote only from five counties within the state, suggested that black support was closer to 58%.

Hispanic and Latino voters also voted for Proposition 8.

Those who described themselves as religious were the strongest supporters of Prop 8. According to the NGLTF study, self-identified Catholics and Protestants supported Prop 8 by measures of 55% and 66%, respectively, while Jews overwhelmingly opposed it, with support at only 17%. Young voters were more likely to have voted against the ballot measure than older voters, while Republicans were more likely to have supported the measure than were Democrats.

=== County breakdown ===
Breakdown of voting by county
County	Yes	Votes	No	Votes
Kern	75.3%	175,167	24.7%	57,496
Tulare	75.1%	78,578	24.9%	26,113
Modoc	74.2%	3,279	25.8%	1,142
Kings	73.7%	25,821	26.3%	9,244
Madera	73.5%	30,906	26.5%	11,193
Glenn	73.3%	7,235	26.7%	2,644
Tehama	72.8%	17,777	27.2%	6,675
Colusa	71.6%	4,556	28.4%	1,815
Lassen	71.3%	8,021	28.7%	3,241
Merced	70.8%	44,800	29.2%	18,520
Sutter	70.4%	23,032	29.6%	9,707
Shasta	69.7%	55,698	30.3%	24,224
Imperial	69.7%	27,048	30.3%	11,783
Fresno	68.7%	185,993	31.3%	83,122
Stanislaus	67.9%	108,988	32.1%	51,598
Yuba	67.6%	14,323	32.4%	6,868
San Bernardino	66.8%	404,762	33.2%	202,227
San Joaquin	65.5%	135,728	34.5%	71,747
Riverside	64.7%	417,133	35.3%	228,449
Sierra	64.2%	1,273	35.8%	711
Amador	64.0%	11,945	36.0%	6,725
Calaveras	63.9%	14,624	36.1%	8,588
Tuolumne	62.6%	16,964	37.4%	10,163
Mariposa	62.1%	5,961	37.9%	3,640
Inyo	60.6%	5,116	39.4%	3,334
Del Norte	60.1%	5,658	39.9%	3,770
Siskiyou	60.0%	12,668	40.0%	8,475
Plumas	60.0%	6,576	40.0%	4,401
Placer	59.8%	102,977	40.2%	69,444
El Dorado	58.3%	53,837	41.7%	38,534
Orange	57.7%	659,037	42.3%	484,015
Trinity	56.2%	3,563	43.8%	2,785
Butte	56.1%	54,822	43.9%	43,045
Solano	55.9%	89,292	44.1%	70,680
San Benito	54.8%	10,657	45.2%	8,794
Sacramento	53.9%	289,378	46.1%	248,444
San Diego	53.8%	655,625	46.2%	565,054
Ventura	52.9%	178,719	47.1%	159,284
Lake	52.0%	13,036	48.0%	12,080
San Luis Obispo	51.1%	67,304	48.9%	64,555
Los Angeles	50.1%	1,624,672	49.9%	1,622,287
Nevada	50.1%	27,617	49.9%	27,614
Monterey	48.4%	62,251	51.6%	66,191
Santa Barbara	46.4%	80,117	53.6%	92,305
Contra Costa	44.6%	198,713	55.4%	246,753
Napa	44.4%	26,227	55.6%	32,742
Mono	44.2%	2,425	55.8%	3,050
Santa Clara	44.2%	291,347	55.8%	367,053
Alpine	43.6%	293	56.4%	379
Yolo	41.3%	32,816	56.4%	46,537
Humboldt	39.9%	25,296	60.1%	37,963
San Mateo	38.2%	114,695	61.8%	185,127
Alameda	38.0%	232,923	62.0%	378,692
Mendocino	36.8%	14,649	63.2%	25,072
Sonoma	33.5%	76,143	66.5%	150,763
Santa Cruz	28.7%	36,163	71.3%	89,793
Marin	24.9%	34,324	75.1%	103,341
San Francisco	24.8%	92,536	75.2%	280,491

=== City breakdown ===
Breakdown of voting by city

Official outcome by city and unincorporated areas of counties, of which Yes won 370 and No won 166
City	County	Yes		No		Margin		Total votes	Swing from 2008 presidential (McCain to "Yes")%
City	County	#	%	#	%	#	%	Total votes	Swing from 2008 presidential (McCain to "Yes")%
Alameda	Alameda	11,075	31.61%	23,957	68.39%	-12,882	-36.77%	35,032	20.06%
Albany	Alameda	1,497	17.35%	7,133	82.65%	-5,636	-65.31%	8,630	13.56%
Berkeley	Alameda	8,114	12.61%	56,209	87.39%	-48,095	-74.77%	64,323	12.82%
Dublin	Alameda	7,463	44.61%	9,265	55.39%	-1,802	-10.77%	16,728	22.90%
Emeryville	Alameda	1,033	22.48%	3,563	77.52%	-2,530	-55.05%	4,596	25.84%
Fremont	Alameda	36,825	49.98%	36,858	50.02%	-33	-0.04%	73,683	43.94%
Hayward	Alameda	20,696	49.55%	21,071	50.45%	-375	-0.90%	41,767	56.77%
Livermore	Alameda	18,413	49.10%	19,090	50.90%	-677	-1.81%	37,503	14.57%
Newark	Alameda	7,218	48.99%	7,516	51.01%	-298	-2.02%	14,734	44.88%
Oakland	Alameda	49,928	30.65%	112,946	69.35%	-63,018	-38.69%	162,874	45.54%
Piedmont	Alameda	1,529	21.53%	5,572	78.47%	-4,043	-56.94%	7,101	0.58%
Pleasanton	Alameda	15,752	45.81%	18,637	54.19%	-2,885	-8.39%	34,389	13.62%
San Leandro	Alameda	15,385	48.12%	16,586	51.88%	-1,201	-3.76%	31,971	49.09%
Union City	Alameda	11,607	51.68%	10,854	48.32%	753	3.35%	22,461	57.22%
Unincorporated area	Alameda	26,388	47.27%	29,435	52.73%	-3,047	-5.46%	55,823	37.09%
Unincorporated area	Alpine	293	43.60%	379	56.40%	-86	-12.80%	672	11.80%
Amador City	Amador	54	45.76%	64	54.24%	-10	-8.47%	118	4.97%
Ione	Amador	1,241	70.87%	510	29.13%	731	41.75%	1,751	14.14%
Jackson	Amador	1,407	64.36%	779	35.64%	628	28.73%	2,186	18.83%
Plymouth	Amador	322	68.51%	148	31.49%	174	37.02%	470	13.35%
Sutter Creek	Amador	812	56.15%	634	43.85%	178	12.31%	1,446	13.07%
Unincorporated area	Amador	8,109	63.86%	4,590	36.14%	3,519	27.71%	12,699	12.35%
Biggs	Butte	427	72.62%	161	27.38%	266	45.24%	588	28.88%
Chico	Butte	16,265	42.35%	22,145	57.65%	-5,880	-15.31%	38,410	9.96%
Gridley	Butte	1,446	72.99%	535	27.01%	911	45.99%	1,981	44.48%
Oroville	Butte	2,798	63.79%	1,588	36.21%	1,210	27.59%	4,386	23.09%
Paradise	Butte	8,757	64.18%	4,887	35.82%	3,870	28.36%	13,644	19.46%
Unincorporated area	Butte	25,129	64.67%	13,729	35.33%	11,400	29.34%	38,858	14.17%
Angels	Calaveras	1,166	61.11%	742	38.89%	424	22.22%	1,908	11.77%
Unincorporated area	Calaveras	13,458	63.17%	7,846	36.83%	5,612	26.34%	21,304	13.12%
Colusa	Colusa	1,314	69.12%	587	30.88%	727	38.24%	1,901	22.93%
Williams	Colusa	634	73.21%	232	26.79%	402	46.42%	866	63.73%
Unincorporated area	Colusa	2,608	72.36%	996	27.64%	1,612	44.73%	3,604	16.43%
Antioch	Contra Costa	19,368	55.47%	15,547	44.53%	3,821	10.94%	34,915	50.35%
Brentwood	Contra Costa	11,770	58.05%	8,506	41.95%	3,264	16.10%	20,276	31.55%
Clayton	Contra Costa	3,244	49.68%	3,286	50.32%	-42	-0.64%	6,530	10.95%
Concord	Contra Costa	21,733	44.93%	26,635	55.07%	-4,902	-10.13%	48,368	24.88%
Danville	Contra Costa	11,046	45.12%	13,436	54.88%	-2,390	-9.76%	24,482	1.79%
El Cerrito	Contra Costa	2,977	23.73%	9,568	76.27%	-6,591	-52.54%	12,545	20.21%
Hercules	Contra Costa	5,286	51.32%	5,014	48.68%	272	2.64%	10,300	58.42%
Lafayette	Contra Costa	4,573	30.91%	10,222	69.09%	-5,649	-38.18%	14,795	-1.31%
Martinez	Contra Costa	7,363	39.22%	11,411	60.78%	-4,048	-21.56%	18,774	16.88%
Moraga	Contra Costa	3,554	38.35%	5,713	61.65%	-2,159	-23.30%	9,267	4.37%
Oakley	Contra Costa	6,451	57.19%	4,828	42.81%	1,623	14.39%	11,279	38.55%
Orinda	Contra Costa	3,459	30.16%	8,010	69.84%	-4,551	-39.68%	11,469	-3.03%
Pinole	Contra Costa	3,973	47.54%	4,384	52.46%	-411	-4.92%	8,357	41.31%
Pittsburg	Contra Costa	10,489	55.28%	8,487	44.72%	2,002	10.55%	18,976	66.89%
Pleasant Hill	Contra Costa	6,022	35.85%	10,777	64.15%	-4,755	-28.31%	16,799	12.80%
Richmond	Contra Costa	14,493	43.17%	19,077	56.83%	-4,584	-13.66%	33,570	63.76%
San Pablo	Contra Costa	3,261	51.97%	3,014	48.03%	247	3.94%	6,275	77.83%
San Ramon	Contra Costa	13,384	45.49%	16,038	54.51%	-2,654	-9.02%	29,422	17.06%
Walnut Creek	Contra Costa	14,301	38.53%	22,815	61.47%	-8,514	-22.94%	37,116	9.53%
Unincorporated area	Contra Costa	31,966	44.43%	39,985	55.57%	-8,019	-11.15%	71,951	19.18%
Crescent City	Del Norte	623	52.13%	572	47.87%	51	4.27%	1,195	15.96%
Unincorporated area	Del Norte	5,035	61.16%	3,198	38.84%	1,837	22.31%	8,233	12.86%
Placerville	El Dorado	2,364	54.58%	1,967	45.42%	397	9.17%	4,331	10.97%
South Lake Tahoe	El Dorado	2,613	38.38%	4,195	61.62%	-1,582	-23.24%	6,808	15.52%
Unincorporated area	El Dorado	48,860	60.15%	32,372	39.85%	16,488	20.30%	81,232	4.84%
Clovis	Fresno	27,415	70.71%	11,356	29.29%	16,059	41.42%	38,771	21.08%
Coalinga	Fresno	2,278	74.52%	779	25.48%	1,499	49.04%	3,057	38.24%
Firebaugh	Fresno	944	76.38%	292	23.62%	652	52.75%	1,236	90.07%
Fowler	Fresno	1,213	74.88%	407	25.12%	806	49.75%	1,620	57.59%
Fresno	Fresno	88,649	64.73%	48,307	35.27%	40,342	29.46%	136,956	44.60%
Huron	Fresno	402	67.34%	195	32.66%	207	34.67%	597	108.31%
Kerman	Fresno	2,085	74.46%	715	25.54%	1,370	48.93%	2,800	63.32%
Kingsburg	Fresno	3,644	80.82%	865	19.18%	2,779	61.63%	4,509	26.02%
Mendota	Fresno	887	78.08%	249	21.92%	638	56.16%	1,136	109.30%
Orange Cove	Fresno	887	72.17%	342	27.83%	545	44.34%	1,229	100.11%
Parlier	Fresno	1,309	73.79%	465	26.21%	844	47.58%	1,774	107.03%
Reedley	Fresno	4,544	76.60%	1,388	23.40%	3,156	53.20%	5,932	52.14%
San Joaquin	Fresno	275	75.97%	87	24.03%	188	51.93%	362	110.68%
Sanger	Fresno	4,232	72.24%	1,626	27.76%	2,606	44.49%	5,858	68.90%
Selma	Fresno	4,011	74.15%	1,398	25.85%	2,613	48.31%	5,409	61.00%
Unincorporated area	Fresno	43,218	72.19%	16,651	27.81%	26,567	44.38%	59,869	25.40%
Orland	Glenn	1,546	70.56%	645	29.44%	901	41.12%	2,191	31.82%
Willows	Glenn	1,440	72.11%	557	27.89%	883	44.22%	1,997	24.44%
Unincorporated area	Glenn	4,249	74.66%	1,442	25.34%	2,807	49.32%	5,691	21.56%
Arcata	Humboldt	1,766	18.54%	7,761	81.46%	-5,995	-62.93%	9,527	5.55%
Blue Lake	Humboldt	242	34.38%	462	65.63%	-220	-31.25%	704	7.85%
Eureka	Humboldt	4,528	40.02%	6,787	59.98%	-2,259	-19.96%	11,315	9.63%
Ferndale	Humboldt	411	49.58%	418	50.42%	-7	-0.84%	829	8.42%
Fortuna	Humboldt	3,062	61.11%	1,949	38.89%	1,113	22.21%	5,011	15.05%
Rio Dell	Humboldt	725	61.03%	463	38.97%	262	22.05%	1,188	17.12%
Trinidad	Humboldt	57	25.11%	170	74.89%	-113	-49.78%	227	3.26%
Unincorporated area	Humboldt	14,505	42.09%	19,953	57.91%	-5,448	-15.81%	34,458	7.38%
Brawley	Imperial	4,472	71.47%	1,785	28.53%	2,687	42.94%	6,257	62.69%
Calexico	Imperial	5,332	66.06%	2,739	33.94%	2,593	32.13%	8,071	99.06%
Calipatria	Imperial	526	73.98%	185	26.02%	341	47.96%	711	75.64%
El Centro	Imperial	7,388	68.31%	3,428	31.69%	3,960	36.61%	10,816	61.83%
Holtville	Imperial	1,051	73.45%	380	26.55%	671	46.89%	1,431	57.08%
Imperial	Imperial	2,786	71.93%	1,087	28.07%	1,699	43.87%	3,873	53.79%
Westmorland	Imperial	336	75.17%	111	24.83%	225	50.34%	447	78.68%
Unincorporated area	Imperial	5,157	71.38%	2,068	28.62%	3,089	42.75%	7,225	41.81%
Bishop	Inyo	764	54.38%	641	45.62%	123	8.75%	1,405	11.93%
Unincorporated area	Inyo	4,352	61.77%	2,693	38.23%	1,659	23.55%	7,045	11.91%
Arvin	Kern	1,640	75.47%	533	24.53%	1,107	50.94%	2,173	96.03%
Bakersfield	Kern	79,206	75.18%	26,151	24.82%	53,055	50.36%	105,357	37.68%
California City	Kern	2,568	68.83%	1,163	31.17%	1,405	37.66%	3,731	18.36%
Delano	Kern	4,847	73.39%	1,757	26.61%	3,090	46.79%	6,604	87.54%
Maricopa	Kern	272	81.68%	61	18.32%	211	63.36%	333	5.53%
McFarland	Kern	1,329	78.27%	369	21.73%	960	56.54%	1,698	101.05%
Ridgecrest	Kern	7,641	67.96%	3,602	32.04%	4,039	35.92%	11,243	2.38%
Shafter	Kern	2,590	81.37%	593	18.63%	1,997	62.74%	3,183	63.84%
Taft	Kern	1,849	80.57%	446	19.43%	1,403	61.13%	2,295	8.82%
Tehachapi	Kern	2,311	75.55%	748	24.45%	1,563	51.10%	3,059	20.99%
Wasco	Kern	2,801	80.79%	666	19.21%	2,135	61.58%	3,467	73.20%
Unincorporated area	Kern	68,113	76.09%	21,407	23.91%	46,706	52.17%	89,520	22.93%
Avenal	Kings	736	70.77%	304	29.23%	432	41.54%	1,040	75.85%
Corcoran	Kings	2,010	77.04%	599	22.96%	1,411	54.08%	2,609	70.25%
Hanford	Kings	11,713	72.68%	4,402	27.32%	7,311	45.37%	16,115	31.18%
Lemoore	Kings	4,885	71.37%	1,960	28.63%	2,925	42.73%	6,845	24.99%
Unincorporated area	Kings	6,477	76.60%	1,979	23.40%	4,498	53.19%	8,456	26.92%
Clearlake	Lake	2,123	52.65%	1,909	47.35%	214	5.31%	4,032	36.79%
Lakeport	Lake	1,052	51.75%	981	48.25%	71	3.49%	2,033	21.03%
Unincorporated area	Lake	9,861	51.76%	9,190	48.24%	671	3.52%	19,051	20.45%
Susanville	Lassen	2,548	69.28%	1,130	30.72%	1,418	38.55%	3,678	10.56%
Unincorporated area	Lassen	5,473	72.17%	2,111	27.83%	3,362	44.33%	7,584	6.90%
Agoura Hills	Los Angeles	4,370	39.52%	6,689	60.48%	-2,319	-20.97%	11,059	-2.73%
Alhambra	Los Angeles	13,507	53.83%	11,585	46.17%	1,922	7.66%	25,092	43.74%
Arcadia	Los Angeles	12,778	61.52%	7,994	38.48%	4,784	23.03%	20,772	23.85%
Artesia	Los Angeles	3,011	67.56%	1,446	32.44%	1,565	35.11%	4,457	59.10%
Avalon	Los Angeles	640	51.16%	611	48.84%	29	2.32%	1,251	13.42%
Azusa	Los Angeles	7,604	62.15%	4,631	37.85%	2,973	24.30%	12,235	54.06%
Baldwin Park	Los Angeles	11,010	62.81%	6,518	37.19%	4,492	25.63%	17,528	79.33%
Bell	Los Angeles	3,912	60.30%	2,576	39.70%	1,336	20.59%	6,488	85.87%
Bell Gardens	Los Angeles	4,187	59.81%	2,814	40.19%	1,373	19.61%	7,001	89.13%
Bellflower	Los Angeles	14,124	65.59%	7,409	34.41%	6,715	31.18%	21,533	62.84%
Beverly Hills	Los Angeles	5,789	34.64%	10,921	65.36%	-5,132	-30.71%	16,710	-10.37%
Bradbury	Los Angeles	284	61.74%	176	38.26%	108	23.48%	460	9.59%
Burbank	Los Angeles	20,050	45.21%	24,298	54.79%	-4,248	-9.58%	44,348	21.83%
Calabasas	Los Angeles	4,061	34.93%	7,566	65.07%	-3,505	-30.15%	11,627	-5.67%
Carson	Los Angeles	23,232	65.07%	12,469	34.93%	10,763	30.15%	35,701	84.06%
Cerritos	Los Angeles	14,711	65.80%	7,646	34.20%	7,065	31.60%	22,357	45.08%
Claremont	Los Angeles	7,328	41.81%	10,199	58.19%	-2,871	-16.38%	17,527	12.63%
Commerce	Los Angeles	2,283	58.21%	1,639	41.79%	644	16.42%	3,922	78.49%
Compton	Los Angeles	16,132	64.97%	8,699	35.03%	7,433	29.93%	24,831	120.48%
Covina	Los Angeles	10,897	61.17%	6,917	38.83%	3,980	22.34%	17,814	35.55%
Cudahy	Los Angeles	2,173	58.76%	1,525	41.24%	648	17.52%	3,698	85.55%
Culver City	Los Angeles	6,688	32.93%	13,621	67.07%	-6,933	-34.14%	20,309	23.20%
Diamond Bar	Los Angeles	14,167	64.12%	7,929	35.88%	6,238	28.23%	22,096	39.94%
Downey	Los Angeles	22,514	63.46%	12,962	36.54%	9,552	26.93%	35,476	51.72%
Duarte	Los Angeles	4,794	58.49%	3,402	41.51%	1,392	16.98%	8,196	47.99%
El Monte	Los Angeles	12,479	60.52%	8,141	39.48%	4,338	21.04%	20,620	66.22%
El Segundo	Los Angeles	4,022	45.63%	4,793	54.37%	-771	-8.75%	8,815	-3.32%
Gardena	Los Angeles	11,874	61.84%	7,326	38.16%	4,548	23.69%	19,200	77.09%
Glendale	Los Angeles	34,754	55.19%	28,217	44.81%	6,537	10.38%	62,971	42.50%
Glendora	Los Angeles	15,036	63.71%	8,565	36.29%	6,471	27.42%	23,601	15.79%
Hawaiian Gardens	Los Angeles	1,777	67.49%	856	32.51%	921	34.98%	2,633	76.59%
Hawthorne	Los Angeles	14,567	62.28%	8,822	37.72%	5,745	24.56%	23,389	85.14%
Hermosa Beach	Los Angeles	3,287	29.34%	7,917	70.66%	-4,630	-41.32%	11,204	-15.38%
Hidden Hills	Los Angeles	362	32.04%	768	67.96%	-406	-35.93%	1,130	-33.84%
Huntington Park	Los Angeles	6,102	59.78%	4,105	40.22%	1,997	19.57%	10,207	87.55%
Industry	Los Angeles	39	72.22%	15	27.78%	24	44.44%	54	7.41%
Inglewood	Los Angeles	22,904	60.97%	14,659	39.03%	8,245	21.95%	37,563	108.78%
Irwindale	Los Angeles	380	61.00%	243	39.00%	137	21.99%	623	65.05%
La Canada Flintridge	Los Angeles	5,881	51.64%	5,508	48.36%	373	3.28%	11,389	3.34%
La Habra Heights	Los Angeles	1,852	64.46%	1,021	35.54%	831	28.92%	2,873	3.99%
La Mirada	Los Angeles	13,527	65.86%	7,011	34.14%	6,516	31.73%	20,538	29.15%
La Puente	Los Angeles	6,071	62.97%	3,570	37.03%	2,501	25.94%	9,641	76.77%
La Verne	Los Angeles	9,702	60.98%	6,209	39.02%	3,493	21.95%	15,911	17.53%
Lakewood	Los Angeles	20,461	58.90%	14,275	41.10%	6,186	17.81%	34,736	30.13%
Lancaster	Los Angeles	30,577	67.56%	14,681	32.44%	15,896	35.12%	45,258	38.72%
Lawndale	Los Angeles	4,830	57.53%	3,566	42.47%	1,264	15.05%	8,396	58.55%
Lomita	Los Angeles	4,398	54.91%	3,612	45.09%	786	9.81%	8,010	20.96%
Long Beach	Los Angeles	73,864	47.07%	83,056	52.93%	-9,192	-5.86%	156,920	35.19%
Los Angeles	Los Angeles	501,610	42.20%	687,027	57.80%	-185,417	-15.60%	1,188,637	38.92%
Lynwood	Los Angeles	8,965	63.24%	5,211	36.76%	3,754	26.48%	14,176	103.49%
Malibu	Los Angeles	2,186	30.51%	4,979	69.49%	-2,793	-38.98%	7,165	-8.92%
Manhattan Beach	Los Angeles	7,141	34.82%	13,370	65.18%	-6,229	-30.37%	20,511	-15.29%
Maywood	Los Angeles	3,112	62.19%	1,892	37.81%	1,220	24.38%	5,004	96.43%
Monrovia	Los Angeles	7,817	51.74%	7,291	48.26%	526	3.48%	15,108	25.45%
Montebello	Los Angeles	10,877	56.59%	8,344	43.41%	2,533	13.18%	19,221	62.66%
Monterey Park	Los Angeles	10,276	57.58%	7,569	42.42%	2,707	15.17%	17,845	46.09%
Norwalk	Los Angeles	18,955	63.88%	10,719	36.12%	8,236	27.75%	29,674	64.93%
Palmdale	Los Angeles	27,515	65.66%	14,391	34.34%	13,124	31.32%	41,906	49.69%
Palos Verdes Estates	Los Angeles	4,265	51.42%	4,029	48.58%	236	2.85%	8,294	-9.31%
Paramount	Los Angeles	7,465	65.09%	4,003	34.91%	3,462	30.19%	11,468	93.61%
Pasadena	Los Angeles	24,353	42.44%	33,023	57.56%	-8,670	-15.11%	57,376	30.75%
Pico Rivera	Los Angeles	12,295	59.00%	8,543	41.00%	3,752	18.01%	20,838	71.11%
Pomona	Los Angeles	21,399	60.88%	13,750	39.12%	7,649	21.76%	35,149	68.01%
Rancho Palos Verdes	Los Angeles	12,015	54.32%	10,104	45.68%	1,911	8.64%	22,119	5.84%
Redondo Beach	Los Angeles	13,405	39.47%	20,556	60.53%	-7,151	-21.06%	33,961	0.98%
Rolling Hills	Los Angeles	674	55.75%	535	44.25%	139	11.50%	1,209	-19.61%
Rolling Hills Estates	Los Angeles	2,374	53.11%	2,096	46.89%	278	6.22%	4,470	-6.44%
Rosemead	Los Angeles	6,987	59.03%	4,850	40.97%	2,137	18.05%	11,837	54.92%
San Dimas	Los Angeles	9,917	62.35%	5,988	37.65%	3,929	24.70%	15,905	20.66%
San Fernando	Los Angeles	3,587	61.46%	2,249	38.54%	1,338	22.93%	5,836	79.88%
San Gabriel	Los Angeles	6,125	56.38%	4,738	43.62%	1,387	12.77%	10,863	38.00%
San Marino	Los Angeles	3,531	54.26%	2,976	45.74%	555	8.53%	6,507	-1.17%
Santa Clarita	Los Angeles	40,932	55.54%	32,760	44.46%	8,172	11.09%	73,692	8.34%
Santa Fe Springs	Los Angeles	3,656	59.44%	2,495	40.56%	1,161	18.87%	6,151	58.75%
Santa Monica	Los Angeles	11,016	22.56%	37,805	77.44%	-26,789	-54.87%	48,821	5.63%
Sierra Madre	Los Angeles	2,858	43.04%	3,782	56.96%	-924	-13.92%	6,640	0.76%
Signal Hill	Los Angeles	1,903	44.87%	2,338	55.13%	-435	-10.26%	4,241	30.13%
South El Monte	Los Angeles	2,489	59.33%	1,706	40.67%	783	18.67%	4,195	75.79%
South Gate	Los Angeles	13,430	61.04%	8,573	38.96%	4,857	22.07%	22,003	85.28%
South Pasadena	Los Angeles	4,621	35.81%	8,282	64.19%	-3,661	-28.37%	12,903	11.71%
Temple City	Los Angeles	7,555	61.60%	4,710	38.40%	2,845	23.20%	12,265	35.10%
Torrance	Los Angeles	33,298	53.83%	28,555	46.17%	4,743	7.67%	61,853	13.31%
Vernon	Los Angeles	29	78.38%	8	21.62%	21	56.76%	37	42.87%
Walnut	Los Angeles	8,012	64.21%	4,465	35.79%	3,547	28.43%	12,477	42.66%
West Covina	Los Angeles	21,971	61.36%	13,833	38.64%	8,138	22.73%	35,804	48.99%
West Hollywood	Los Angeles	2,696	13.78%	16,863	86.22%	-14,167	-72.43%	19,559	-4.88%
Westlake Village	Los Angeles	2,264	46.19%	2,638	53.81%	-374	-7.63%	4,902	-1.49%
Whittier	Los Angeles	19,031	57.46%	14,092	42.54%	4,939	14.91%	33,123	29.17%
Unincorporated area	Los Angeles	193,073	57.63%	141,971	42.37%	51,102	15.25%	335,044	51.86%
Chowchilla	Madera	2,207	77.44%	643	22.56%	1,564	54.88%	2,850	34.95%
Madera	Madera	8,204	73.95%	2,890	26.05%	5,314	47.90%	11,094	60.50%
Unincorporated area	Madera	20,495	72.79%	7,660	27.21%	12,835	45.59%	28,155	22.73%
Belvedere	Marin	423	30.09%	983	69.91%	-560	-39.83%	1,406	-6.75%
Corte Madera	Marin	1,223	22.63%	4,182	77.37%	-2,959	-54.75%	5,405	7.19%
Fairfax	Marin	650	13.37%	4,212	86.63%	-3,562	-73.26%	4,862	6.36%
Larkspur	Marin	1,682	22.94%	5,650	77.06%	-3,968	-54.12%	7,332	5.45%
Mill Valley	Marin	1,280	14.55%	7,520	85.45%	-6,240	-70.91%	8,800	2.75%
Novato	Marin	222	26.52%	615	73.48%	-393	-46.95%	837	-3.88%
Ross	Marin	9,348	35.98%	16,630	64.02%	-7,282	-28.03%	25,978	15.43%
San Anselmo	Marin	374	24.72%	1,139	75.28%	-765	-50.56%	1,513	22.88%
San Rafael	Marin	1,201	15.74%	6,428	84.26%	-5,227	-68.51%	7,629	-10.78%
Sausalito	Marin	6,825	26.01%	19,414	73.99%	-12,589	-47.98%	26,239	16.06%
Tiburon	Marin	912	18.79%	3,942	81.21%	-3,030	-62.42%	4,854	-15.97%
Unincorporated area	Marin	1,315	27.45%	3,475	72.55%	-2,160	-45.09%	4,790	14.39%
Multiple Districts	Marin	8,869	23.33%	29,151	76.67%	-20,282	-53.35%	38,020	4.12%
Unincorporated area	Mariposa	5,961	62.09%	3,640	37.91%	2,321	24.17%	9,601	11.72%
Fort Bragg	Mendocino	975	35.92%	1,739	64.08%	-764	-28.15%	2,714	23.13%
Point Arena	Mendocino	36	18.85%	155	81.15%	-119	-62.30%	191	18.43%
Ukiah	Mendocino	2,533	42.17%	3,474	57.83%	-941	-15.67%	6,007	22.70%
Willits	Mendocino	761	41.95%	1,053	58.05%	-292	-16.10%	1,814	24.77%
Unincorporated area	Mendocino	10,344	35.68%	18,651	64.32%	-8,307	-28.65%	28,995	14.25%
Atwater	Merced	5,296	72.64%	1,995	27.36%	3,301	45.27%	7,291	47.27%
Dos Palos	Merced	973	77.96%	275	22.04%	698	55.93%	1,248	56.01%
Gustine	Merced	1,095	69.30%	485	30.70%	610	38.61%	1,580	49.15%
Livingston	Merced	1,688	69.90%	727	30.10%	961	39.79%	2,415	100.53%
Los Banos	Merced	5,619	67.29%	2,732	32.71%	2,887	34.57%	8,351	58.95%
Merced	Merced	12,881	65.99%	6,640	34.01%	6,241	31.97%	19,521	48.41%
Unincorporated area	Merced	17,248	75.27%	5,666	24.73%	11,582	50.55%	22,914	42.95%
Alturas	Modoc	904	71.63%	358	28.37%	546	43.26%	1,262	18.66%
Unincorporated area	Modoc	2,375	75.18%	784	24.82%	1,591	50.36%	3,159	7.01%
Mammoth Lakes	Mono	939	34.92%	1,750	65.08%	-811	-30.16%	2,689	0.20%
Unincorporated area	Mono	1,486	53.34%	1,300	46.66%	186	6.68%	2,786	3.47%
Carmel-by-the-Sea	Monterey	903	35.76%	1,622	64.24%	-719	-28.48%	2,525	4.45%
Del Rey Oaks	Monterey	349	38.14%	566	61.86%	-217	-23.72%	915	15.90%
Gonzales	Monterey	1,000	57.01%	754	42.99%	246	14.03%	1,754	72.19%
Greenfield	Monterey	1,469	62.78%	871	37.22%	598	25.56%	2,340	88.54%
King City	Monterey	1,146	61.68%	712	38.32%	434	23.36%	1,858	59.67%
Marina	Monterey	3,431	49.20%	3,542	50.80%	-111	-1.59%	6,973	37.49%
Monterey	Monterey	4,352	36.38%	7,611	63.62%	-3,259	-27.24%	11,963	16.73%
Pacific Grove	Monterey	2,691	31.35%	5,893	68.65%	-3,202	-37.30%	8,584	13.78%
Salinas	Monterey	19,690	56.42%	15,212	43.58%	4,478	12.83%	34,902	57.31%
Sand City	Monterey	43	42.57%	58	57.43%	-15	-14.85%	101	21.07%
Seaside	Monterey	4,143	47.24%	4,627	52.76%	-484	-5.52%	8,770	47.28%
Soledad	Monterey	1,798	59.32%	1,233	40.68%	565	18.64%	3,031	78.60%
Unincorporated area	Monterey	21,236	47.48%	23,490	52.52%	-2,254	-5.04%	44,726	18.38%
American Canyon	Napa	3,391	54.02%	2,886	45.98%	505	8.05%	6,277	47.71%
Calistoga	Napa	735	37.85%	1,207	62.15%	-472	-24.30%	1,942	22.55%
Napa	Napa	13,881	43.15%	18,286	56.85%	-4,405	-13.69%	32,167	21.52%
St. Helena	Napa	1,020	36.14%	1,802	63.86%	-782	-27.71%	2,822	13.53%
Yountville	Napa	814	44.60%	1,011	55.40%	-197	-10.79%	1,825	23.38%
Unincorporated area	Napa	6,386	45.82%	7,550	54.18%	-1,164	-8.35%	13,936	10.72%
Grass Valley	Nevada	2,863	49.79%	2,887	50.21%	-24	-0.42%	5,750	12.39%
Nevada City	Nevada	550	29.94%	1,287	70.06%	-737	-40.12%	1,837	3.60%
Truckee	Nevada	2,569	34.82%	4,810	65.18%	-2,241	-30.37%	7,379	6.43%
Unincorporated area	Nevada	21,635	53.73%	18,630	46.27%	3,005	7.46%	40,265	4.13%
Aliso Viejo	Orange	9,717	48.46%	10,336	51.54%	-619	-3.09%	20,053	4.05%
Anaheim	Orange	57,119	62.35%	34,488	37.65%	22,631	24.70%	91,607	29.60%
Brea	Orange	11,320	62.21%	6,876	37.79%	4,444	24.42%	18,196	9.83%
Buena Park	Orange	15,869	64.19%	8,854	35.81%	7,015	28.37%	24,723	36.70%
Costa Mesa	Orange	19,457	49.52%	19,831	50.48%	-374	-0.95%	39,288	5.64%
Cypress	Orange	12,900	61.29%	8,149	38.71%	4,751	22.57%	21,049	18.39%
Dana Point	Orange	8,953	51.05%	8,584	48.95%	369	2.10%	17,537	-2.83%
Fountain Valley	Orange	16,236	61.14%	10,319	38.86%	5,917	22.28%	26,555	8.83%
Fullerton	Orange	29,242	59.27%	20,095	40.73%	9,147	18.54%	49,337	18.11%
Garden Grove	Orange	32,845	65.57%	17,246	34.43%	15,599	31.14%	50,091	26.83%
Huntington Beach	Orange	49,780	53.15%	43,880	46.85%	5,900	6.30%	93,660	-1.04%
Irvine	Orange	40,566	48.90%	42,393	51.10%	-1,827	-2.20%	82,959	14.45%
La Habra	Orange	12,297	64.32%	6,820	35.68%	5,477	28.65%	19,117	29.43%
La Palma	Orange	4,345	66.00%	2,238	34.00%	2,107	32.01%	6,583	30.83%
Laguna Beach	Orange	4,523	31.83%	9,685	68.17%	-5,162	-36.33%	14,208	-9.15%
Laguna Hills	Orange	8,273	56.85%	6,279	43.15%	1,994	13.70%	14,552	5.12%
Laguna Niguel	Orange	17,441	53.86%	14,941	46.14%	2,500	7.72%	32,382	1.81%
Laguna Woods	Orange	6,394	54.98%	5,236	45.02%	1,158	9.96%	11,630	15.26%
Lake Forest	Orange	19,415	57.83%	14,156	42.17%	5,259	15.67%	33,571	6.46%
Los Alamitos	Orange	2,921	57.61%	2,149	42.39%	772	15.23%	5,070	12.86%
Mission Viejo	Orange	28,263	59.01%	19,629	40.99%	8,634	18.03%	47,892	7.02%
Newport Beach	Orange	24,363	51.32%	23,108	48.68%	1,255	2.64%	47,471	-14.61%
Orange	Orange	31,194	59.68%	21,074	40.32%	10,120	19.36%	52,268	10.42%
Placentia	Orange	12,803	61.91%	7,877	38.09%	4,926	23.82%	20,680	12.69%
Rancho Santa Margarita	Orange	12,625	57.20%	9,446	42.80%	3,179	14.40%	22,071	1.90%
San Clemente	Orange	17,468	55.54%	13,985	44.46%	3,483	11.07%	31,453	-2.93%
San Juan Capistrano	Orange	8,730	59.76%	5,878	40.24%	2,852	19.52%	14,608	4.67%
Santa Ana	Orange	37,674	61.87%	23,221	38.13%	14,453	23.73%	60,895	56.86%
Seal Beach	Orange	8,294	55.75%	6,582	44.25%	1,712	11.51%	14,876	7.26%
Stanton	Orange	5,614	62.83%	3,321	37.17%	2,293	25.66%	8,935	35.48%
Tustin	Orange	13,657	56.47%	10,529	43.53%	3,128	12.93%	24,186	18.29%
Villa Park	Orange	2,466	66.45%	1,245	33.55%	1,221	32.90%	3,711	-10.95%
Westminster	Orange	20,087	65.89%	10,398	34.11%	9,689	31.78%	30,485	17.80%
Yorba Linda	Orange	22,711	65.76%	11,823	34.24%	10,888	31.53%	34,534	0.87%
Unincorporated area	Orange	33,475	58.92%	23,344	41.08%	10,131	17.83%	56,819	-0.27%
Auburn	Placer	3,964	53.42%	3,456	46.58%	508	6.85%	7,420	9.33%
Colfax	Placer	456	57.65%	335	42.35%	121	15.30%	791	16.30%
Lincoln	Placer	13,169	63.88%	7,447	36.12%	5,722	27.76%	20,616	15.32%
Loomis	Placer	2,308	63.81%	1,309	36.19%	999	27.62%	3,617	3.03%
Rocklin	Placer	15,732	59.30%	10,797	40.70%	4,935	18.60%	26,529	5.90%
Roseville	Placer	32,261	59.63%	21,838	40.37%	10,423	19.27%	54,099	10.12%
Unincorporated area	Placer	35,087	59.12%	24,262	40.88%	10,825	18.24%	59,349	4.89%
Portola	Plumas	502	58.03%	363	41.97%	139	16.07%	865	10.68%
Unincorporated area	Plumas	6,074	60.07%	4,038	39.93%	2,036	20.13%	10,112	7.60%
Banning	Riverside	7,335	70.37%	3,089	29.63%	4,246	40.73%	10,424	35.79%
Beaumont	Riverside	6,973	67.81%	3,310	32.19%	3,663	35.62%	10,283	31.94%
Blythe	Riverside	2,339	70.39%	984	29.61%	1,355	40.78%	3,323	38.27%
Calimesa	Riverside	2,506	70.87%	1,030	29.13%	1,476	41.74%	3,536	17.29%
Canyon Lake	Riverside	3,609	69.30%	1,599	30.70%	2,010	38.59%	5,208	0.20%
Cathedral City	Riverside	7,147	52.71%	6,413	47.29%	734	5.41%	13,560	31.52%
Coachella	Riverside	3,317	66.74%	1,653	33.26%	1,664	33.48%	4,970	102.80%
Corona	Riverside	30,878	66.44%	15,596	33.56%	15,282	32.88%	46,474	32.20%
Desert Hot Springs	Riverside	2,981	55.91%	2,351	44.09%	630	11.82%	5,332	33.80%
Hemet	Riverside	17,640	70.11%	7,522	29.89%	10,118	40.21%	25,162	30.73%
Indian Wells	Riverside	1,629	61.70%	1,011	38.30%	618	23.41%	2,640	-12.03%
Indio	Riverside	11,866	64.24%	6,605	35.76%	5,261	28.48%	18,471	46.12%
La Quinta	Riverside	9,125	60.97%	5,841	39.03%	3,284	21.94%	14,966	9.16%
Lake Elsinore	Riverside	7,701	64.59%	4,221	35.41%	3,480	29.19%	11,922	32.56%
Moreno Valley	Riverside	33,701	68.66%	15,381	31.34%	18,320	37.33%	49,082	70.03%
Murrieta	Riverside	25,082	68.89%	11,328	31.11%	13,754	37.78%	36,410	19.29%
Norco	Riverside	6,216	68.35%	2,878	31.65%	3,338	36.71%	9,094	6.98%
Palm Desert	Riverside	11,415	56.89%	8,649	43.11%	2,766	13.79%	20,064	5.85%
Palm Springs	Riverside	6,774	35.09%	12,530	64.91%	-5,756	-29.82%	19,304	6.86%
Perris	Riverside	7,830	69.94%	3,366	30.06%	4,464	39.87%	11,196	85.50%
Rancho Mirage	Riverside	4,380	51.02%	4,205	48.98%	175	2.04%	8,585	-4.87%
Riverside	Riverside	54,368	60.30%	35,799	39.70%	18,569	20.59%	90,167	34.90%
San Jacinto	Riverside	7,066	70.27%	2,989	29.73%	4,077	40.55%	10,055	42.88%
Temecula	Riverside	22,810	65.32%	12,108	34.68%	10,702	30.65%	34,918	13.42%
Wildomar	Riverside	7,351	70.18%	3,123	29.82%	4,228	40.37%	10,474	21.21%
Unincorporated area	Riverside	115,094	67.72%	54,868	32.28%	60,226	35.43%	169,962	30.05%
Citrus Heights	Sacramento	20,443	60.11%	13,566	39.89%	6,877	20.22%	34,009	14.47%
Elk Grove	Sacramento	34,615	59.34%	23,717	40.66%	10,898	18.68%	58,332	35.83%
Folsom	Sacramento	17,604	57.09%	13,233	42.91%	4,371	14.17%	30,837	6.20%
Galt	Sacramento	5,257	69.10%	2,351	30.90%	2,906	38.20%	7,608	33.80%
Isleton	Sacramento	185	60.46%	121	39.54%	64	20.92%	306	43.74%
Rancho Cordova	Sacramento	12,367	56.94%	9,351	43.06%	3,016	13.89%	21,718	28.59%
Sacramento	Sacramento	75,394	45.33%	90,926	54.67%	-15,532	-9.34%	166,320	37.09%
Unincorporated area	Sacramento	123,513	56.48%	95,179	43.52%	28,334	12.96%	218,692	20.52%
Hollister	San Benito	5,740	53.92%	4,905	46.08%	835	7.84%	10,645	45.15%
San Juan Bautista	San Benito	347	46.77%	395	53.23%	-48	-6.47%	742	30.30%
Unincorporated area	San Benito	4,570	56.67%	3,494	43.33%	1,076	13.34%	8,064	15.59%
Adelanto	San Bernardino	3,549	69.17%	1,582	30.83%	1,967	38.34%	5,131	69.26%
Apple Valley	San Bernardino	18,968	73.10%	6,981	26.90%	11,987	46.19%	25,949	21.10%
Barstow	San Bernardino	4,166	67.93%	1,967	32.07%	2,199	35.86%	6,133	36.80%
Big Bear Lake	San Bernardino	1,684	62.91%	993	37.09%	691	25.81%	2,677	0.04%
Chino	San Bernardino	15,493	66.61%	7,765	33.39%	7,728	33.23%	23,258	38.76%
Chino Hills	San Bernardino	20,002	65.90%	10,351	34.10%	9,651	31.80%	30,353	29.28%
Colton	San Bernardino	8,702	66.18%	4,446	33.82%	4,256	32.37%	13,148	71.07%
Fontana	San Bernardino	31,058	67.78%	14,765	32.22%	16,293	35.56%	45,823	71.58%
Grand Terrace	San Bernardino	3,150	63.44%	1,815	36.56%	1,335	26.89%	4,965	26.07%
Hesperia	San Bernardino	17,634	73.31%	6,421	26.69%	11,213	46.61%	24,055	31.03%
Highland	San Bernardino	10,723	66.34%	5,441	33.66%	5,282	32.68%	16,164	39.96%
Loma Linda	San Bernardino	5,402	69.19%	2,405	30.81%	2,997	38.39%	7,807	39.67%
Montclair	San Bernardino	5,757	65.50%	3,032	34.50%	2,725	31.00%	8,789	61.72%
Needles	San Bernardino	964	65.36%	511	34.64%	453	30.71%	1,475	27.79%
Ontario	San Bernardino	26,844	66.14%	13,742	33.86%	13,102	32.28%	40,586	58.53%
Rancho Cucamonga	San Bernardino	41,360	64.51%	22,751	35.49%	18,609	29.03%	64,111	29.82%
Redlands	San Bernardino	17,886	59.39%	12,231	40.61%	5,655	18.78%	30,117	17.30%
Rialto	San Bernardino	17,055	69.03%	7,650	30.97%	9,405	38.07%	24,705	85.55%
San Bernardino	San Bernardino	31,882	65.78%	16,583	34.22%	15,299	31.57%	48,465	62.93%
Twentynine Palms	San Bernardino	2,766	64.12%	1,548	35.88%	1,218	28.23%	4,314	10.60%
Upland	San Bernardino	18,680	62.33%	11,290	37.67%	7,390	24.66%	29,970	24.17%
Victorville	San Bernardino	19,091	70.99%	7,802	29.01%	11,289	41.98%	26,893	51.74%
Yucaipa	San Bernardino	14,398	69.46%	6,329	30.54%	8,069	38.93%	20,727	15.17%
Yucca Valley	San Bernardino	5,199	67.07%	2,553	32.93%	2,646	34.13%	7,752	11.81%
Unincorporated area	San Bernardino	62,349	67.32%	30,273	32.68%	32,076	34.63%	92,622	22.71%
Carlsbad	San Diego	27,435	51.01%	26,344	48.99%	1,091	2.03%	53,779	2.45%
Chula Vista	San Diego	50,162	62.12%	30,583	37.88%	19,579	24.25%	80,745	44.57%
Coronado	San Diego	4,956	54.51%	4,136	45.49%	820	9.02%	9,092	-6.19%
Del Mar	San Diego	891	32.13%	1,882	67.87%	-991	-35.74%	2,773	-7.10%
El Cajon	San Diego	19,703	63.26%	11,445	36.74%	8,258	26.51%	31,148	21.30%
Encinitas	San Diego	12,841	38.40%	20,597	61.60%	-7,756	-23.20%	33,438	0.97%
Escondido	San Diego	27,778	63.95%	15,657	36.05%	12,121	27.91%	43,435	19.94%
Imperial Beach	San Diego	4,327	55.32%	3,495	44.68%	832	10.64%	7,822	27.97%
La Mesa	San Diego	13,369	50.60%	13,054	49.40%	315	1.19%	26,423	14.41%
Lemon Grove	San Diego	5,781	61.05%	3,689	38.95%	2,092	22.09%	9,470	40.77%
National City	San Diego	8,068	65.93%	4,170	34.07%	3,898	31.85%	12,238	63.38%
Oceanside	San Diego	37,667	59.09%	26,073	40.91%	11,594	18.19%	63,740	20.67%
Poway	San Diego	14,703	59.88%	9,852	40.12%	4,851	19.76%	24,555	2.00%
San Diego	San Diego	244,233	45.94%	287,371	54.06%	-43,138	-8.11%	531,604	18.73%
San Marcos	San Diego	17,314	58.95%	12,059	41.05%	5,255	17.89%	29,373	16.65%
Santee	San Diego	15,386	62.36%	9,286	37.64%	6,100	24.72%	24,672	5.15%
Solana Beach	San Diego	3,036	41.24%	4,326	58.76%	-1,290	-17.52%	7,362	-2.83%
Vista	San Diego	16,948	60.50%	11,063	39.50%	5,885	21.01%	28,011	20.80%
Unincorporated area	San Diego	131,027	65.19%	69,972	34.81%	61,055	30.38%	200,999	9.93%
San Francisco	San Francisco	92,536	24.81%	280,491	75.19%	-187,955	-50.39%	373,027	20.20%
Escalon	San Joaquin	2,173	73.34%	790	26.66%	1,383	46.68%	2,963	25.07%
Lathrop	San Joaquin	2,572	64.51%	1,415	35.49%	1,157	29.02%	3,987	60.23%
Lodi	San Joaquin	15,413	69.05%	6,908	30.95%	8,505	38.10%	22,321	21.66%
Manteca	San Joaquin	13,978	66.38%	7,078	33.62%	6,900	32.77%	21,056	38.52%
Ripon	San Joaquin	4,855	76.26%	1,511	23.74%	3,344	52.53%	6,366	18.34%
Stockton	San Joaquin	49,429	62.34%	29,863	37.66%	19,566	24.68%	79,292	56.20%
Tracy	San Joaquin	14,990	60.79%	9,667	39.21%	5,323	21.59%	24,657	45.00%
Unincorporated area	San Joaquin	32,318	69.01%	14,515	30.99%	17,803	38.01%	46,833	27.90%
Arroyo Grande	San Luis Obispo	5,455	56.63%	4,178	43.37%	1,277	13.26%	9,633	11.04%
Atascadero	San Luis Obispo	7,772	55.56%	6,216	44.44%	1,556	11.12%	13,988	5.80%
El Paso de Robles	San Luis Obispo	7,342	59.63%	4,971	40.37%	2,371	19.26%	12,313	9.44%
Grover Beach	San Luis Obispo	2,879	53.76%	2,476	46.24%	403	7.53%	5,355	16.20%
Morro Bay	San Luis Obispo	2,722	44.59%	3,382	55.41%	-660	-10.81%	6,104	9.87%
Pismo Beach	San Luis Obispo	2,593	53.06%	2,294	46.94%	299	6.12%	4,887	9.14%
San Luis Obispo	San Luis Obispo	8,065	34.86%	15,072	65.14%	-7,007	-30.28%	23,137	6.47%
Unincorporated area	San Luis Obispo	30,476	54.00%	25,966	46.00%	4,510	7.99%	56,442	6.05%
Atherton	San Mateo	1,637	38.47%	2,618	61.53%	-981	-23.06%	4,255	-6.61%
Belmont	San Mateo	4,336	33.40%	8,647	66.60%	-4,311	-33.20%	12,983	15.45%
Brisbane	San Mateo	559	27.22%	1,495	72.78%	-936	-45.57%	2,054	15.57%
Burlingame	San Mateo	4,699	34.13%	9,068	65.87%	-4,369	-31.74%	13,767	14.46%
Colma	San Mateo	254	49.32%	261	50.68%	-7	-1.36%	515	58.48%
Daly City	San Mateo	15,081	49.92%	15,128	50.08%	-47	-0.16%	30,209	50.99%
East Palo Alto	San Mateo	3,045	51.72%	2,842	48.28%	203	3.45%	5,887	87.91%
Foster City	San Mateo	5,159	38.53%	8,232	61.47%	-3,073	-22.95%	13,391	21.21%
Half Moon Bay	San Mateo	1,929	34.43%	3,674	65.57%	-1,745	-31.14%	5,603	11.46%
Hillsborough	San Mateo	2,641	42.76%	3,535	57.24%	-894	-14.48%	6,176	-0.72%
Menlo Park	San Mateo	4,418	28.31%	11,186	71.69%	-6,768	-43.37%	15,604	11.52%
Millbrae	San Mateo	4,689	49.21%	4,839	50.79%	-150	-1.57%	9,528	34.57%
Pacifica	San Mateo	6,490	33.63%	12,811	66.37%	-6,321	-32.75%	19,301	20.98%
Portola Valley	San Mateo	796	27.34%	2,116	72.66%	-1,320	-45.33%	2,912	-5.20%
Redwood City	San Mateo	10,792	35.92%	19,254	64.08%	-8,462	-28.16%	30,046	22.80%
San Bruno	San Mateo	7,285	44.49%	9,091	55.51%	-1,806	-11.03%	16,376	39.57%
San Carlos	San Mateo	5,168	31.80%	11,082	68.20%	-5,914	-36.39%	16,250	8.17%
San Mateo	San Mateo	15,305	37.18%	25,860	62.82%	-10,555	-25.64%	41,165	23.21%
South San Francisco	San Mateo	10,704	48.45%	11,387	51.55%	-683	-3.09%	22,091	49.36%
Woodside	San Mateo	1,132	33.60%	2,237	66.40%	-1,105	-32.80%	3,369	-4.44%
Unincorporated area	San Mateo	8,576	30.26%	19,764	69.74%	-11,188	-39.48%	28,340	12.57%
Buellton	Santa Barbara	1,205	55.79%	955	44.21%	250	11.57%	2,160	14.99%
Carpinteria	Santa Barbara	2,541	44.06%	3,226	55.94%	-685	-11.88%	5,767	21.72%
Goleta	Santa Barbara	5,960	41.60%	8,368	58.40%	-2,408	-16.81%	14,328	15.60%
Guadalupe	Santa Barbara	965	66.41%	488	33.59%	477	32.83%	1,453	77.31%
Lompoc	Santa Barbara	7,617	62.99%	4,476	37.01%	3,141	25.97%	12,093	30.46%
Santa Barbara	Santa Barbara	12,374	30.11%	28,720	69.89%	-16,346	-39.78%	41,094	12.60%
Santa Maria	Santa Barbara	14,977	68.29%	6,956	31.71%	8,021	36.57%	21,933	38.67%
Solvang	Santa Barbara	1,539	55.90%	1,214	44.10%	325	11.81%	2,753	7.46%
Unincorporated area	Santa Barbara	32,939	46.50%	37,902	53.50%	-4,963	-7.01%	70,841	6.75%
Campbell	Santa Clara	6,646	39.54%	10,164	60.46%	-3,518	-20.93%	16,810	19.39%
Cupertino	Santa Clara	10,565	46.03%	12,387	53.97%	-1,822	-7.94%	22,952	35.19%
Gilroy	Santa Clara	7,842	51.23%	7,464	48.77%	378	2.47%	15,306	38.53%
Los Altos	Santa Clara	6,087	35.13%	11,239	64.87%	-5,152	-29.74%	17,326	8.33%
Los Altos Hills	Santa Clara	1,967	38.52%	3,139	61.48%	-1,172	-22.95%	5,106	3.98%
Los Gatos	Santa Clara	5,947	35.94%	10,598	64.06%	-4,651	-28.11%	16,545	6.09%
Milpitas	Santa Clara	11,812	57.49%	8,733	42.51%	3,079	14.99%	20,545	48.29%
Monte Sereno	Santa Clara	818	37.71%	1,351	62.29%	-533	-24.57%	2,169	-4.21%
Morgan Hill	Santa Clara	7,923	50.29%	7,831	49.71%	92	0.58%	15,754	23.99%
Mountain View	Santa Clara	9,076	30.65%	20,531	69.35%	-11,455	-38.69%	29,607	17.67%
Palo Alto	Santa Clara	8,240	24.46%	25,444	75.54%	-17,204	-51.07%	33,684	11.11%
San Jose	Santa Clara	152,515	47.84%	166,290	52.16%	-13,775	-4.32%	318,805	35.84%
Santa Clara	Santa Clara	17,126	44.16%	21,659	55.84%	-4,533	-11.69%	38,785	32.22%
Saratoga	Santa Clara	7,923	46.61%	9,076	53.39%	-1,153	-6.78%	16,999	18.38%
Sunnyvale	Santa Clara	20,110	41.64%	28,186	58.36%	-8,076	-16.72%	48,296	28.40%
Unincorporated area	Santa Clara	16,750	42.18%	22,961	57.82%	-6,211	-15.64%	39,711	19.84%
Capitola	Santa Cruz	1,512	28.53%	3,788	71.47%	-2,276	-42.94%	5,300	14.81%
Santa Cruz	Santa Cruz	5,046	15.47%	27,579	84.53%	-22,533	-69.07%	32,625	6.78%
Scotts Valley	Santa Cruz	2,591	40.57%	3,796	59.43%	-1,205	-18.87%	6,387	10.61%
Watsonville	Santa Cruz	5,566	49.21%	5,745	50.79%	-179	-1.58%	11,311	60.97%
Unincorporated area	Santa Cruz	21,448	30.49%	48,885	69.51%	-27,437	-39.01%	70,333	12.30%
Anderson	Shasta	2,238	70.44%	939	29.56%	1,299	40.89%	3,177	24.86%
Redding	Shasta	26,284	67.77%	12,502	32.23%	13,782	35.53%	38,786	12.38%
Shasta Lake	Shasta	2,760	69.52%	1,210	30.48%	1,550	39.04%	3,970	21.89%
Unincorporated area	Shasta	24,416	71.84%	9,573	28.16%	14,843	43.67%	33,989	12.80%
Loyalton	Sierra	277	70.84%	114	29.16%	163	41.69%	391	17.92%
Unincorporated area	Sierra	996	62.52%	597	37.48%	399	25.05%	1,593	4.63%
Dorris	Siskiyou	203	74.91%	68	25.09%	135	49.82%	271	12.00%
Dunsmuir	Siskiyou	392	49.25%	404	50.75%	-12	-1.51%	796	22.83%
Etna	Siskiyou	277	69.42%	122	30.58%	155	38.85%	399	9.70%
Fort Jones	Siskiyou	195	68.90%	88	31.10%	107	37.81%	283	7.04%
Montague	Siskiyou	362	68.05%	170	31.95%	192	36.09%	532	-2.84%
Mt. Shasta	Siskiyou	766	44.12%	970	55.88%	-204	-11.75%	1,736	19.40%
Tulelake	Siskiyou	158	72.48%	60	27.52%	98	44.95%	218	12.97%
Weed	Siskiyou	551	55.71%	438	44.29%	113	11.43%	989	36.25%
Yreka	Siskiyou	2,034	61.86%	1,254	38.14%	780	23.72%	3,288	6.74%
Unincorporated area	Siskiyou	7,730	61.20%	4,901	38.80%	2,829	22.40%	12,631	6.17%
Benicia	Solano	6,206	41.21%	8,853	58.79%	-2,647	-17.58%	15,059	15.72%
Dixon	Solano	4,286	60.91%	2,751	39.09%	1,535	21.81%	7,037	29.78%
Fairfield	Solano	21,264	58.75%	14,928	41.25%	6,336	17.51%	36,192	46.71%
Rio Vista	Solano	2,313	58.63%	1,632	41.37%	681	17.26%	3,945	26.03%
Suisun City	Solano	5,817	59.71%	3,925	40.29%	1,892	19.42%	9,742	60.89%
Vacaville	Solano	21,132	59.25%	14,535	40.75%	6,597	18.50%	35,667	27.94%
Vallejo	Solano	22,972	52.65%	20,660	47.35%	2,312	5.30%	43,632	56.90%
Unincorporated area	Solano	5,302	60.96%	3,396	39.04%	1,906	21.91%	8,698	14.23%
Cloverdale	Sonoma	1,617	43.94%	2,063	56.06%	-446	-12.12%	3,680	27.53%
Cotati	Sonoma	1,042	28.59%	2,602	71.41%	-1,560	-42.81%	3,644	13.35%
Healdsburg	Sonoma	1,756	31.61%	3,799	68.39%	-2,043	-36.78%	5,555	13.78%
Petaluma	Sonoma	9,416	33.28%	18,877	66.72%	-9,461	-33.44%	28,293	17.25%
Rohnert Park	Sonoma	6,319	36.15%	11,163	63.85%	-4,844	-27.71%	17,482	19.99%
Santa Rosa	Sonoma	24,611	34.54%	46,652	65.46%	-22,041	-30.93%	71,263	20.43%
Sebastopol	Sonoma	847	19.17%	3,572	80.83%	-2,725	-61.67%	4,419	11.05%
Sonoma	Sonoma	1,861	30.95%	4,151	69.05%	-2,290	-38.09%	6,012	11.66%
Windsor	Sonoma	5,176	43.56%	6,707	56.44%	-1,531	-12.88%	11,883	23.86%
Unincorporated area	Sonoma	23,498	31.47%	51,177	68.53%	-27,679	-37.07%	74,675	11.88%
Ceres	Stanislaus	8,029	70.14%	3,418	29.86%	4,611	40.28%	11,447	57.02%
Hughson	Stanislaus	1,770	76.06%	557	23.94%	1,213	52.13%	2,327	35.79%
Modesto	Stanislaus	43,714	63.98%	24,609	36.02%	19,105	27.96%	68,323	35.31%
Newman	Stanislaus	1,676	69.03%	752	30.97%	924	38.06%	2,428	54.58%
Oakdale	Stanislaus	5,105	70.74%	2,112	29.26%	2,993	41.47%	7,217	24.38%
Patterson	Stanislaus	3,084	63.81%	1,749	36.19%	1,335	27.62%	4,833	59.87%
Riverbank	Stanislaus	4,464	70.72%	1,848	29.28%	2,616	41.44%	6,312	49.89%
Turlock	Stanislaus	15,204	68.33%	7,048	31.67%	8,156	36.65%	22,252	36.04%
Waterford	Stanislaus	1,832	75.95%	580	24.05%	1,252	51.91%	2,412	37.95%
Unincorporated area	Stanislaus	24,110	72.98%	8,925	27.02%	15,185	45.97%	33,035	32.15%
Live Oak	Sutter	1,553	73.92%	548	26.08%	1,005	47.83%	2,101	54.53%
Yuba City	Sutter	14,527	69.12%	6,489	30.88%	8,038	38.25%	21,016	28.27%
Unincorporated area	Sutter	6,952	72.25%	2,670	27.75%	4,282	44.50%	9,622	7.97%
Corning	Tehama	1,340	72.39%	511	27.61%	829	44.79%	1,851	36.43%
Red Bluff	Tehama	3,023	68.24%	1,407	31.76%	1,616	36.48%	4,430	28.83%
Tehama	Tehama	133	69.63%	58	30.37%	75	39.27%	191	13.11%
Unincorporated area	Tehama	13,281	73.87%	4,699	26.13%	8,582	47.73%	17,980	17.88%
Unincorporated area	Trinity	3,563	56.13%	2,785	43.87%	778	12.26%	6,348	16.87%
Dinuba	Tulare	2,963	78.68%	803	21.32%	2,160	57.36%	3,766	66.13%
Exeter	Tulare	2,357	77.56%	682	22.44%	1,675	55.12%	3,039	24.74%
Farmersville	Tulare	1,061	73.63%	380	26.37%	681	47.26%	1,441	73.16%
Lindsay	Tulare	1,169	76.81%	353	23.19%	816	53.61%	1,522	78.37%
Porterville	Tulare	8,433	75.95%	2,671	24.05%	5,762	51.89%	11,104	42.85%
Tulare	Tulare	10,322	76.87%	3,105	23.13%	7,217	53.75%	13,427	41.67%
Visalia	Tulare	27,615	71.70%	10,897	28.30%	16,718	43.41%	38,512	24.61%
Woodlake	Tulare	764	69.84%	330	30.16%	434	39.67%	1,094	77.85%
Unincorporated area	Tulare	23,894	77.61%	6,892	22.39%	17,002	55.23%	30,786	33.20%
Sonora	Tuolumne	1,676	56.36%	1,298	43.64%	378	12.71%	2,974	13.49%
Unincorporated area	Tuolumne	15,288	63.30%	8,865	36.70%	6,423	26.59%	24,153	12.21%
Camarillo	Ventura	18,253	55.30%	14,753	44.70%	3,500	10.60%	33,006	9.38%
Fillmore	Ventura	3,122	66.12%	1,600	33.88%	1,522	32.23%	4,722	53.64%
Moorpark	Ventura	8,521	53.64%	7,364	46.36%	1,157	7.28%	15,885	10.38%
Ojai	Ventura	1,547	37.78%	2,548	62.22%	-1,001	-24.44%	4,095	10.21%
Oxnard	Ventura	28,235	57.97%	20,472	42.03%	7,763	15.94%	48,707	56.69%
Port Hueneme	Ventura	3,468	53.72%	2,988	46.28%	480	7.43%	6,456	36.05%
San Buenaventura	Ventura	24,660	47.65%	27,088	52.35%	-2,428	-4.69%	51,748	17.16%
Santa Paula	Ventura	5,248	62.00%	3,217	38.00%	2,031	23.99%	8,465	54.95%
Simi Valley	Ventura	31,432	56.13%	24,564	43.87%	6,868	12.27%	55,996	7.36%
Thousand Oaks	Ventura	32,691	50.44%	32,126	49.56%	565	0.87%	64,817	3.60%
Unincorporated area	Ventura	21,542	48.84%	22,564	51.16%	-1,022	-2.32%	44,106	7.87%
Davis	Yolo	7,371	22.84%	24,905	77.16%	-17,534	-54.33%	32,276	8.36%
West Sacramento	Yolo	8,350	52.56%	7,536	47.44%	814	5.12%	15,886	30.28%
Winters	Yolo	1,388	55.79%	1,100	44.21%	288	11.58%	2,488	34.08%
Woodland	Yolo	10,851	56.28%	8,431	43.72%	2,420	12.55%	19,282	27.86%
Unincorporated area	Yolo	4,856	51.54%	4,565	48.46%	291	3.09%	9,421	13.73%
Marysville	Yuba	2,339	64.97%	1,261	35.03%	1,078	29.94%	3,600	21.31%
Wheatland	Yuba	853	66.28%	434	33.72%	419	32.56%	1,287	10.83%
Unincorporated area	Yuba	11,131	68.27%	5,173	31.73%	5,958	36.54%	16,304	21.06%
Totals		7,001,084	52.24%	6,401,482	47.76%	599,602	4.47%	13,402,566	28.57%

Cities & unincorporated areas that voted "Yes" on Proposition 8 and for Barack Obama

- Union City (Alameda)
- Sutter Creek (Amador)
- Williams (Colusa)
- Antioch (Contra Costa)
- Brentwood (Contra Costa)
- Hercules (Contra Costa)
- Oakley (Contra Costa)
- Pittsburg (Contra Costa)
- San Pablo (Contra Costa)
- Crescent City (Del Norte)
- Placerville (El Dorado)
- Firebaugh (Fresno)
- Fowler (Fresno)
- Fresno (Fresno)
- Huron (Fresno)
- Kerman (Fresno)
- Mendota (Fresno)
- Orange Cove (Fresno)
- Parlier (Fresno)
- San Joaquin (Fresno)
- Sanger (Fresno)
- Selma (Fresno)
- Brawley (Imperial)
- Calexico (Imperial)
- Calipatria (Imperial)
- El Centro (Imperial)
- Holtville (Imperial)
- Imperial (Imperial)
- Westmorland (Imperial)
- Bishop (Inyo)
- Arvin (Kern)
- Delano (Kern)
- McFarland (Kern)
- Shafter (Kern)
- Wasco (Kern)
- Avenal (Kings)
- Corcoran (Kings)
- Clearlake (Lake)
- Lakeport (Lake)
- Unincorporated area (Lake)
- Alhambra (Los Angeles)
- Arcadia (Los Angeles)
- Artesia (Los Angeles)
- Avalon (Los Angeles)
- Azusa (Los Angeles)
- Baldwin Park (Los Angeles)
- Bell (Los Angeles)
- Bell Gardens (Los Angeles)
- Bellflower (Los Angeles)
- Carson (Los Angeles)
- Cerritos (Los Angeles)
- Commerce (Los Angeles)
- Compton (Los Angeles)
- Covina (Los Angeles)
- Cudahy (Los Angeles)
- Diamond Bar (Los Angeles)
- Downey (Los Angeles)
- Duarte (Los Angeles)
- El Monte (Los Angeles)
- Gardena (Los Angeles)
- Glendale (Los Angeles)
- Hawaiian Gardens (Los Angeles)
- Hawthorne (Los Angeles)
- Huntington Park (Los Angeles)
- Inglewood (Los Angeles)
- Irwindale (Los Angeles)
- La Canada Flintridge (Los Angeles)
- La Puente (Los Angeles)
- Lakewood (Los Angeles)
- Lancaster (Los Angeles)
- Lawndale (Los Angeles)
- Lomita (Los Angeles)
- Lynwood (Los Angeles)
- Maywood (Los Angeles)
- Monrovia (Los Angeles)
- Montebello (Los Angeles)
- Monterey Park (Los Angeles)
- Norwalk (Los Angeles)
- Palmdale (Los Angeles)
- Paramount (Los Angeles)
- Pico Rivera (Los Angeles)
- Pomona (Los Angeles)
- Rosemead (Los Angeles)
- San Fernando (Los Angeles)
- San Gabriel (Los Angeles)
- Santa Fe Springs (Los Angeles)
- South El Monte (Los Angeles)
- South Gate (Los Angeles)
- Temple City (Los Angeles)
- Torrance (Los Angeles)
- Unincorporated area (Los Angeles)
- Walnut (Los Angeles)
- West Covina (Los Angeles)
- Whittier (Los Angeles)
- Madera (Madera)
- Atwater (Merced)
- Dos Palos (Merced)
- Gustine (Merced)
- Livingston (Merced)
- Los Banos (Merced)
- Merced (Merced)
- Gonzales (Monterey)
- Greenfield (Monterey)
- King City (Monterey)
- Salinas (Monterey)
- Soledad (Monterey)
- American Canyon (Napa)
- Anaheim (Orange)
- Buena Park (Orange)
- La Habra (Orange)
- Laguna Woods (Orange)
- Santa Ana (Orange)
- Stanton (Orange)
- Tustin (Orange)
- Auburn (Placer)
- Colfax (Placer)
- Cathedral City (Riverside)
- Coachella (Riverside)
- Desert Hot Springs (Riverside)
- Indio (Riverside)
- Lake Elsinore (Riverside)
- Moreno Valley (Riverside)
- Perris (Riverside)
- Riverside (Riverside)
- San Jacinto (Riverside)
- Elk Grove (Sacramento)
- Isleton (Sacramento)
- Rancho Cordova (Sacramento)
- Unincorporated area (Sacramento)
- Hollister (San Benito)
- Unincorporated area (San Benito)
- Adelanto (San Bernardino)
- Barstow (San Bernardino)
- Chino (San Bernardino)
- Colton (San Bernardino)
- Fontana (San Bernardino)
- Highland (San Bernardino)
- Loma Linda (San Bernardino)
- Montclair (San Bernardino)
- Ontario (San Bernardino)
- Rancho Cucamonga (San Bernardino)
- Rialto (San Bernardino)
- San Bernardino (San Bernardino)
- Victorville (San Bernardino)
- Carlsbad (San Diego)
- Chula Vista (San Diego)
- Imperial Beach (San Diego)
- La Mesa (San Diego)
- Lemon Grove (San Diego)
- National City (San Diego)
- Oceanside (San Diego)
- Lathrop (San Joaquin)
- Manteca (San Joaquin)
- Stockton (San Joaquin)
- Tracy (San Joaquin)
- Grover Beach (San Luis Obispo)
- Pismo Beach (San Luis Obispo)
- East Palo Alto (San Mateo)
- Buellton (Santa Barbara)
- Guadalupe (Santa Barbara)
- Lompoc (Santa Barbara)
- Santa Maria (Santa Barbara)
- Gilroy (Santa Clara)
- Milpitas (Santa Clara)
- Morgan Hill (Santa Clara)
- Weed (Siskiyou)
- Dixon (Solano)
- Fairfield (Solano)
- Rio Vista (Solano)
- Suisun City (Solano)
- Vacaville (Solano)
- Vallejo (Solano)
- Ceres (Stanislaus)
- Modesto (Stanislaus)
- Newman (Stanislaus)
- Patterson (Stanislaus)
- Riverbank (Stanislaus)
- Live Oak (Sutter)
- Unincorporated area (Trinity)
- Dinuba (Tulare)
- Farmersville (Tulare)
- Lindsay (Tulare)
- Woodlake (Tulare)
- Sonora (Tuolumne)
- Fillmore (Ventura)
- Moorpark (Ventura)
- Oxnard Ventura)
- Port Hueneme (Ventura)
- Santa Paula (Ventura)
- Thousand Oaks (Ventura)
- Unincorporated area (Yolo)
- West Sacramento (Yolo)
- Winters (Yolo)
- Woodland (Yolo)

== Post-election events ==
=== Immediate response ===
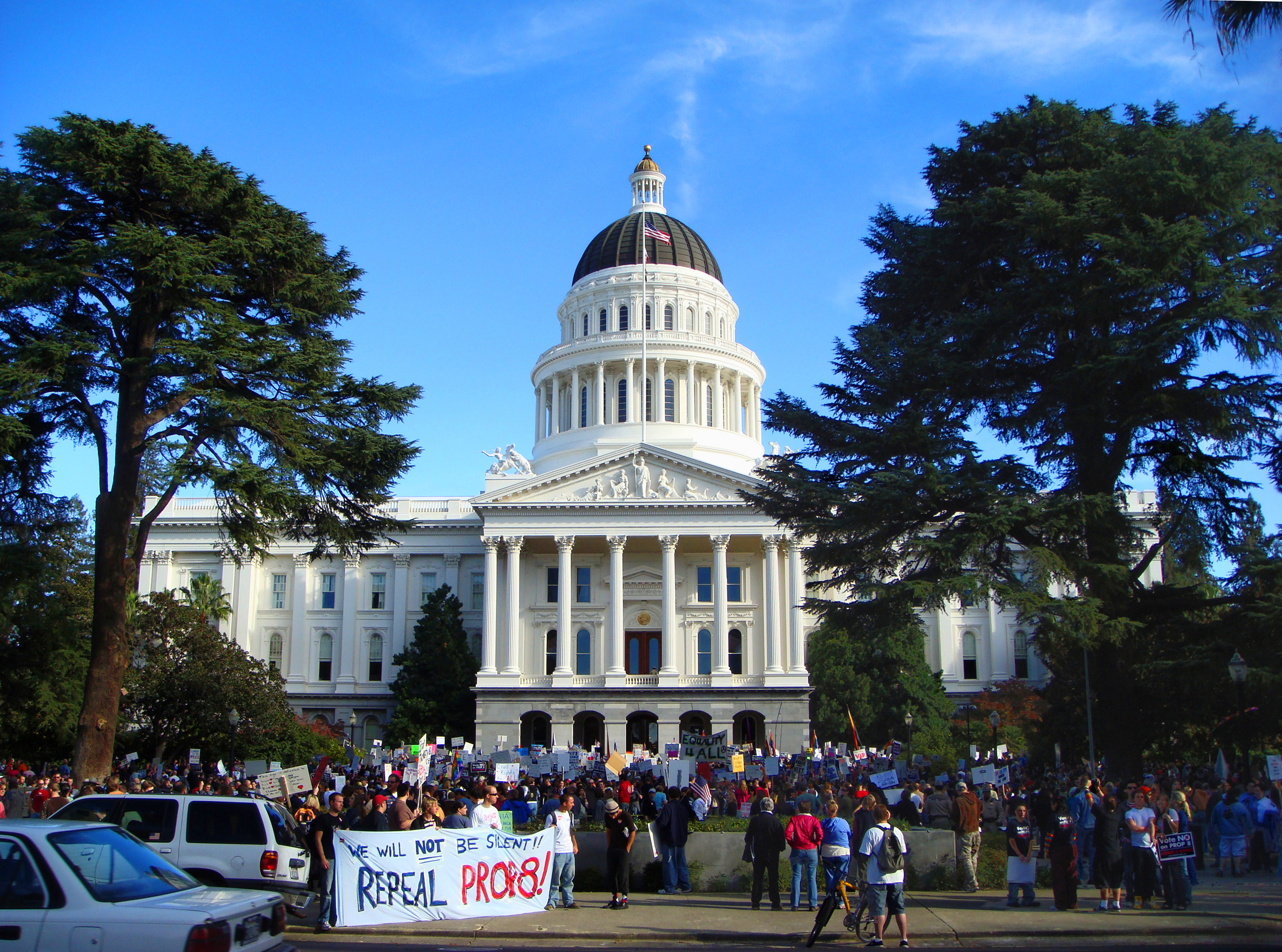
A post-Prop 8 demonstration at the State Capitol

In California, a constitutional amendment passed by the electorate takes effect the day after the election. On the evening of November 4 the "Yes on 8" campaign issued a statement by Ron Prentice, the chairman of ProtectMarriage.com, saying "The people of California stood up for traditional marriage and reclaimed this great institution." The organizers of the "No on Prop 8" campaign issued a statement on November 6 saying, "Tuesday's vote was deeply disappointing to all who believe in equal treatment under the law." The counties of Los Angeles, San Francisco, Yolo, Kern, Santa Barbara, San Luis Obispo, Sonoma, San Diego, San Bernardino, Sacramento, and Tuolumne stopped issuing marriage licenses to same-sex couples the day after the election.

=== Fines ===
Following an audit by the California Franchise Tax Board, the proponents of Proposition 8 faced a fine of $49,000 for violating California campaign finance disclosure laws, by failing to report $1,169,292 in contributions under the timelines required by state law.

=== Protests ===
Following the passage of Proposition 8, mass protests took place across the state. These included protests outside the Los Angeles California Temple of The Church of Jesus Christ of Latter-day Saints in Westwood, Los Angeles; a march through Hollywood that blocked traffic and elicited police intervention; and a candlelight vigil in front of the Sacramento Gay and Lesbian Center, along with a protest in front of the California State Capitol.

In San Francisco, thousands gathered in front of the City Hall to protest the proposition and to perform a candlelit vigil. Speakers who voiced their opinion in opposition of Proposition 8 included state senator Mark Leno and Mayor of San Francisco Gavin Newsom.

Outside California, a protest at the headquarters of The Church of Jesus Christ of Latter-day Saints in Salt Lake City, Utah was addressed by local gay rights supporters including former Salt Lake City Mayor Rocky Anderson and three gay members of the Utah Legislature: Senator Scott McCoy and Representatives Christine Johnson and Jackie Biskupski. On November 12, 2008, more than 10,000 protesters gathered outside the Manhattan New York Temple to protest the support of The Church of Jesus Christ of Latter-day Saints for Proposition 8. On November 15, 2008, tens of thousands of people in cities around the United States participated in rallies to protest the passage of Proposition 8 and to promote the expansion of civil marriage to same-sex couples throughout the nation.

=== Boycotts ===
The passage of Proposition 8 led to opponents responding by publicly shaming its supporters as bigots and boycotting supporters' businesses and employers. On November 7, 2008, a blogger revealed that Scott Eckern, then Artistic Director of California Musical Theatre, had made a personal donation of $1,000 to the "Yes on 8" campaign. All campaign contributions of $1,000 or more required a name, home and occupation be listed. On November 10, gay artists condemned Eckern and called for a boycott of California Musical Theatre. On November 11, Eckern issued an apology on the online site Playbill stating that a similar donation had been made to a human rights organization that includes gay rights as one of its causes. On November 12, Eckern resigned from California Musical Theatre. Executive producer of the CMT Richard Lewis stated that Eckern was not forced to resign but did so of his own accord.

Richard Raddon, director of the Los Angeles Film Festival, also resigned due to boycotts by the gay community.

Protests in California were marred by racial incidents. Due to their support of Proposition 8, reported as high as 70 percent, some African Americans attending events were allegedly subjected to racial epithets and felt threatened. California Assembly Speaker Karen Bass stated she was disturbed by the treatment of African Americans in the aftermath of the passage of the proposition. In reaction to the racial incidents, Evan Wolfson said, "In any fight, there will be people who say things they shouldn't say, but that shouldn't divert attention from what the vast majority are saying against this, that it's a terrible injustice."

=== Media ===
To protest the passage of Proposition 8, musical theatre composer Marc Shaiman wrote a satiric mini-musical called "Prop 8 — The Musical". The three-minute video was distributed on the internet at FunnyOrDie.com. The cast includes Jack Black (who plays Jesus), Nicole Parker, Neil Patrick Harris, John C. Reilly, Allison Janney, Andy Richter, Maya Rudolph, Margaret Cho, Rashida Jones, Kathy Najimy, Sarah Chalke, Jennifer Lewis, John Hill and other celebrities. It was directed by Adam Shankman. The video satirizes Christian churches that selectively pick and choose biblical doctrines to follow. It received 1.2 million internet hits in its first day, won the 2009 Webby Award category Comedy: Individual Short or Episode, and won a GLAAD media award.

In 2010, 8: The Mormon Proposition, a documentary alleging the involvement of the Church of Jesus Christ of Latter-day Saints in the passage of Proposition 8. Written by Reed Cowan and narrated by Dustin Lance Black, the film divided critics over a perceived heavy-handed approach to the church's involvement; it won the 2011 GLAAD Media Award for Outstanding Documentary.

In 2011, 8, a play re-enacting the proceedings of Perry v. Brown in a condensed manner of documentary theatre, was premiered on Broadway.

== Controversies about campaign financing and donations ==
On November 13, 2008, Fred Karger of the group Californians Against Hate filed a complaint with the California Fair Political Practices Commission that campaign finance reports filed by The Church of Jesus Christ of Latter-day Saints under-reported its actual Proposition 8 campaign expenses as $2,078.97. Karger charged that the Church's failure to report "non-monetary contributions" placed it in violation of California's Political Reform Act. Church spokesman Scott Trotter denied the charges, saying the church had "fully complied with the reporting requirements" and a "further report will be filed on or before [...the] due date, Jan. 30, 2009."

In a report filed with the California Secretary of State's office January 30, 2009, the LDS Church reported its non-monetary expenditures as $189,903.58. On January 31, the San Francisco Chronicle stated, "While the deadline for the report, which covers the period from July 1 to Dec. 31, is [February 2], many campaign contributions by major donors and independent committees must be reported within days after they're made." The article further stated that the executive director of the FPPC stated that the LDS church was still under investigation, and "In general, however, 'cases like these hinge over what had to be reported and when it had to be reported.' A late report covering disputed filings 'wouldn't remove the obligation to file on time' but would be considered by investigators."

The Boston Herald reported on February 2, 2009:

While many church members had donated directly to the Yes on 8 campaign—some estimates of Mormon giving range as high as $20 million—the church itself had previously reported little direct campaign activity. But in the filing made Friday, the Mormon church reported thousands in travel expenses, such as airline tickets, hotel rooms and car rentals for the campaign. The church also reported $96,849.31 worth of 'compensated staff time'—hours that church employees spent working to pass the same-sex marriage ban.

In a statement issued February 2, 2009, the LDS Church responded to "erroneous news reports", saying its subsequent disclosure was "in no way prompted by an investigation by the California Fair Political Practices Commission," that "We believe we have complied with California law," and that the report's filing date met the January 31, 2009 deadline:

The Church, like other organizations on both sides of the ballot issue, was required to publicly file these donations by the 31 January deadline. The Church has been filing required contribution reports throughout the campaign. Those earlier donations 'initially stated' were filed for specific time periods prior to this last reporting period, as required by law. Other groups are also filing their final contribution reports to meet the same deadline.

On January 7, 2009, supporters of Proposition 8 filed a federal lawsuit to block public disclosure of their donations. Alleging threats against their lives as well as other forms of harassment, the lawsuit also requested a preliminary injunction that ordered the California Secretary of State to remove information about donations posted on its website. Opponents of Proposition 8 called it "hypocritical" that its supporters would refer to their support of the measure as the "will of the people" while seeking to overturn voter-approved campaign disclosure laws. U.S. District Judge Morrison England Jr. denied that request on January 29; he said that the public had the right to know about donors of political causes, that he did not agree that the plaintiffs had a probability of success in court, and that they had not proven they would suffer "irreparable injury" if he did not grant the preliminary injunction.

== Litigation ==
=== California Supreme Court cases ===
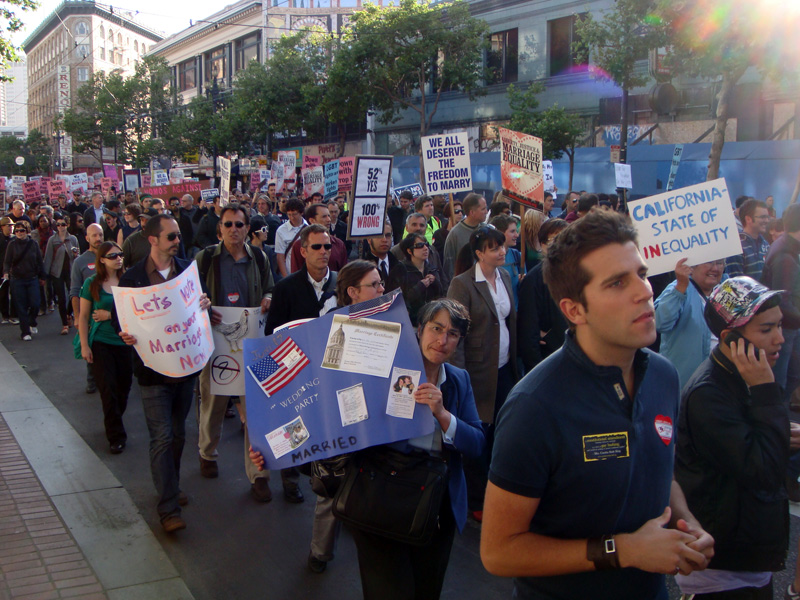
Protesters at the "Day of Decision" rally marched up Market Street in downtown San Francisco following the California Supreme Court ruling.

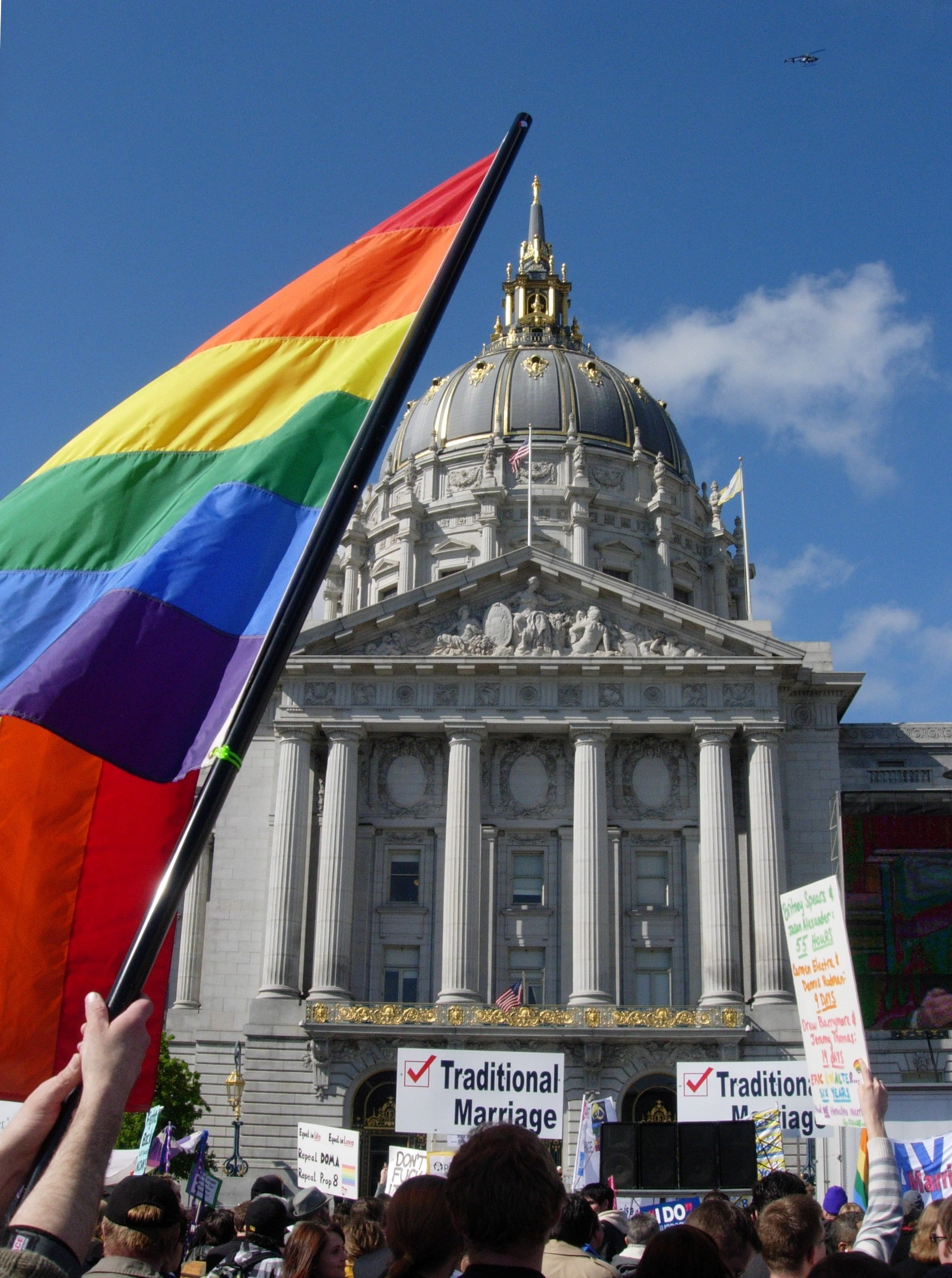
Pro- and anti-Proposition 8 protesters' rally in front of the San Francisco City Hall on the day of the Supreme Court hearings

After the passage of Proposition 8, a number of lawsuits were filed by against the state and state officials with the intent of overturning the measure and arguing that Proposition 8 should not have retroactive effect on existing same-sex marriages. On November 13, 2008, the California Supreme Court asked California Attorney General Jerry Brown for an opinion on whether the Court should accept these cases for review and whether the measure should be suspended while they decide the case. On November 19, the Court accepted three lawsuits challenging Proposition 8 but denied the requests to stay its enforcement. The Court asked for final briefs by January 5, 2009. Oral arguments were held on March 5, 2009.

On Tuesday May 26 the court ruled that "The Amendment to the State Constitution referred to as Proposition 8 is valid and enforceable from the moment it was passed." The court also held that "Proposition 8 must be understood as creating a limited exception to the state equal protection clause." Justice Moreno in his lone dissenting opinion, argued that such a change to the Constitution should only be implemented "by a constitutional revision to modify the equal protection clause to protect some, rather than all, similarly situated persons" and not by a simple majority vote.

The Court did rule that their decision cannot be applied to retroactively annul marriages that were transacted while the practice was legal in the state of California. Proposition 8 has no retroactive effect. The California Supreme Court ruled unanimously on May 26, 2009, that the approximately 18,000 same-sex marriages that had occurred prior to Proposition 8's passage would still be valid and must continue to be recognized in the state, since the amendment does not state explicitly that it would nullify the same-sex marriages performed before it took effect.

Later legislation clarified that same-sex couples who married out-of-state within the window of legality would also retain their legal marriage rights. The bill was signed by Governor Arnold Schwarzenegger on October 11, 2009.

=== Federal challenges ===
==== Smelt v. United States ====
Immediately following the passage of Proposition 8, Arthur Smelt and Christopher Hammer filed suit in the Southern Division of the United States District Court for the Central District of California, in Orange County. In the case, Smelt v. United States, the couple argued that Proposition 8 and the Federal Defense of Marriage Act violated the Equal Protection Clause of the American constitution. The United States Justice Department filed a motion to dismiss the case because the "plaintiffs are married, and their challenge to the federal Defense of Marriage Act ("DOMA") poses a different set of questions." On July 15, 2009, District Judge Carter dismissed the part of Smelt that challenged Proposition 8, finding that the fact that the plaintiffs were already legally married in California meant they had no standing to challenge Proposition 8. The challenge to the Defense of Marriage Act, however, remained intact. The remainder of the case was heard on August 3, 2009, in an Orange County district court. The lawsuit was thrown out because the two men had filed suit against the federal government in a state court, a technicality which meant the suit needed to be re-filed.

==== Perry v. Schwarzenegger ====
On the day of Strauss v. Horton's decision, the American Foundation for Equal Rights (AFER) filed suit in U.S. District Court for the Northern District of California to challenge the validity of Proposition 8. Lambda Legal, the ACLU, and the National Center for Lesbian Rights have since announced their support for the lawsuit. San Francisco filed a motion to and was granted intervenor status in the case, saying that their work in In re Marriage Cases and Strauss v. Horton provided them with "extensive evidence and proposed findings on strict scrutiny factors and factual rebuttals to long claimed justifications for marriage discrimination".

California Attorney General, and former and later again Governor Jerry Brown backed the lawsuit, saying that Proposition 8 violates the U.S. Constitution and should be struck down. Governor Arnold Schwarzenegger took a more neutral path, saying that he supported the lawsuit because the Proposition 8 conflict asks "important constitutional questions that require and warrant judicial determination." Because this means that the Californian government will not defend the law in court, the proponents of Proposition 8's campaign were granted the right to intervene as defendants. The case was first heard on July 2, 2009, in the United States District Court for the Northern District of California in San Francisco, Judge Vaughn R. Walker presiding.

In an act unprecedented in California history both the Governor and Attorney General refused to defend a constitutional amendment.

In August, Judge Walker heard further requests for intervenor status and ordered a trial set for January 2010. On August 4, 2010, U.S. District Chief Judge Vaughn R. Walker ruled Proposition 8 unconstitutional, but at the same time temporarily provided for a suspension of the ruling while he considered whether to grant an indefinite suspension pending appeal. Walker lifted the stay on August 12, 2010, thus allowing same-sex marriages to be performed as of August 18, 2010.

On August 16, 2010, the United States Court of Appeals for the Ninth Circuit imposed a stay of all new same-sex marriages in the State of California. It also scheduled an accelerated time table for hearing an appeal of Judge Walker's ruling. Before the appeal trial begins, there will be a December 6, 2010 hearing on who has legal standing to appeal the District Court's decision and whether the proposition violates equal protection rights.

== Legal challenges ==
Following the passing of Proposition 8 in 2008, and the subsequent mass protests, several lawsuits were filed in both the State Supreme Court and in the Federal District Court.

=== State court: Strauss v. Horton ===
In considering the cases within the state courts, on November 13, 2008, the California Supreme Court asked California Attorney General Jerry Brown for an opinion on whether the Court should accept these cases for review and whether the measure should be suspended while they decide the case. On November 19, the Court accepted three lawsuits challenging Proposition 8, which consolidated into Strauss v. Horton. The Court rendered its decision on May 26, 2009. The majority decision was that Proposition 8 "carved out a limited [or 'narrow'] exception to the state equal protection clause"; Justice Moreno dissented that exceptions to the Equal Protection Clause could not be made by any majority since its whole purpose was to protect minorities against the will of a majority. Until overturned by Hollingsworth v. Perry (below), the ruling established that Proposition 8 was valid as voted, but that marriages performed before it went into effect would remain valid.

=== Federal court ===
==== Perry v. Schwarzenegger ====
After the California Supreme Court upheld the voter initiative, a suit, Perry v. Schwarzenegger (later Hollingsworth v. Perry), was filed in a Federal District Court in San Francisco. On August 4, 2010, U.S. District Chief Judge Vaughn Walker overturned Proposition 8, stating it is "unconstitutional under the Due Process Clause because no compelling state interest justifies denying same-sex couples the fundamental right to marry." The court also determined that "Proposition 8 violated the Equal Protection Clause because there is no rational basis for limiting the designation of 'marriage' to opposite-sex couples." The court also stayed the ruling; the voter initiative was to remain in effect pending appeal. On August 12, Walker announced his decision to lift the stay (which would have allowed same-sex marriages to be performed) as of August 18, 2010. However, on August 16, 2010, the United States Court of Appeals for the Ninth Circuit indefinitely extended the District Court's stay, stopping new same-sex marriages in the state of California pending appeal. It also scheduled an accelerated time table for hearing an appeal of Walker's ruling.

==== Perry v. Brown (on appeal) ====
As the State of California chose not to appeal the ruling, an appeal was sought by two parties—the initiative proponents, and Imperial County (via its deputy clerk). The Ninth Circuit Court of Appeals considered the question of standing first. On January 4, 2011, the Ninth Circuit ruled that Imperial County did not have standing to intervene in the lawsuit (by now called Perry v. Brown)—the formal reason being the county's appeal had been "untimely", but also that the appellant was the county's deputy clerk, and precedent existed in other cases that a deputy clerk could not 'represent' a county.

To address the question whether the initiative proponents had particularized standing (that is, standing either via personal interest, or standing to represent the State's interest), the Ninth Circuit certified a question to the California Supreme Court on January 4, 2011, asking that court to rule whether, under the California Constitution or otherwise under California law, non-governmental proponents of an initiative have standing to appeal when the State is no longer willing to defend it. On February 16, 2011, the California Supreme Court unanimously agreed to address the Ninth Circuit's request. The court set an expedited schedule for the hearing and heard oral arguments on September 6, 2011. On November 17, 2011, the California Supreme Court issued an advisory opinion that the proponents of Proposition 8 did have standing, and could defend it.

===== Ninth Circuit ruling =====
Seal of the United States Court of Appeals for the Ninth Circuit

On February 7, 2012, a three-judge panel on the Ninth Circuit Court of Appeals issued a 2–1 majority opinion affirming the judgment in Perry v. Schwarzenegger, which declared Proposition 8 unconstitutional, saying it violated the Equal Protection Clause. The opinion, written by Judge Stephen Reinhardt and joined by Judge Michael Hawkins, states that Proposition 8 did nothing more than lessen the status and dignity of gays and lesbians, and classify their relationships and families as inferior to those of opposite-sex couples. The court found that the people of California, by using their initiative power to target a minority group and withdraw the right to marry they once possessed under the California State Constitution, violated the federal Constitution.

The court concluded that the trial court had correctly found Proposition 8 to have no purpose other than to impose the majority's private disapproval of gays, lesbians, and their relationships through the public law, and to take away from them the designation of marriage and its recognized societal status. The findings of fact and expert witness testimony in District Court played an important role in this appellate decision, emphasizing that it is unreasonable to believe Proposition 8 was enacted to: promote childrearing by biological parents, encourage procreation, be cautious in social change, protect religious liberty, or control children's education. The court declared that it is "implausible to think that denying two men or two women the right to call themselves married could somehow bolster the stability of families headed by one man and one woman".

The dissenting judge, Judge N. Randy Smith, noted in his dissent that states do legitimately prohibit sexual relationships condemned by society such as incest, bigamy, and bestiality, and impose age limits for marriage without violating constitutional rights. He stated that "gays and lesbians are not a suspect or quasi-suspect class" and are thus not entitled to the courts' increased scrutiny of laws that affect them. He wrote, "The family structure of two committed biological parents—one man and one woman—is the optimal partnership for raising children." He also said that governments have a legitimate interest in "a responsible procreation theory, justifying the inducement of marital recognition only for opposite-sex couples" because only they can have children. He urged judicial restraint, that the justices should refrain from striking down Proposition 8.

===== En banc review denied =====
On February 21, 2012, proponents requested to have the case reviewed en banc by the Ninth Circuit Court of Appeals. If granted, en banc review could have taken a year or more, which would have delayed possible U.S. Supreme Court review. Pending the appeal, a stay was continued, barring any marriages from taking place. On June 5, 2012, the full Ninth Circuit refused to rehear the case; the stay would remain in place pending final action by the Supreme Court.

The Ninth Court's ruling was subsequently vacated (withdrawn) although it affirmed the district court ruling, since the Supreme Court later determined that the proponents of Proposition 8 had not had standing to appeal the district court's ruling.

==== Hollingsworth v. Perry (U.S. Supreme Court) ====
The proposition's proponents filed a petition for certiorari with the U.S. Supreme Court on July 30, 2012, requesting that the Supreme Court review the case. Briefs in opposition both from the individual respondents and from the City and County of San Francisco were filed August 24, and the petitioners replied on September 4. On December 7, 2012, the Supreme Court granted the proponents' petition for certiorari and asked to be briefed for arguments concerning the petitioners' Article III standing, amid considerable anticipation of a finding of a lack of justiciability in order to avoid a holding on the merits. Oral arguments were heard on March 26, 2013.

Parties who lodged amicus briefs with the court included: Judge Georg Ress and the Marriage Law Foundation; William N. Eskridge Jr., et al.; the Center for Constitutional Jurisprudence; the Public Advocate of the United States, et al.; the National Association of Evangelicals, et al.; the American Civil Rights Union; Judicial Watch, Inc., et al.; the Eagle Forum Education & Legal Defense Fund, Inc.; the Foundation for Moral Law; and the state of Indiana, et al.

The Supreme Court issued a 5–4 decision on June 26, 2013. Chief Justice Roberts wrote for the majority, and was joined by Justices Scalia, Ginsburg, Breyer, and Kagan. Justices Kennedy, Thomas, Alito, and Sotomayor were in the minority. The Court found the proponents did not have standing to appeal in federal court. To have standing, they "must have suffered an injury in fact, thus giving [them] a sufficiently concrete interest in the outcome of the issue in dispute". Because no injury had been shown, the appeal to the Ninth Circuit should have been dismissed for lack of jurisdiction. (This only applied to the Ninth Circuit and Supreme Court cases.) The Court returned the case to the Ninth Circuit with instructions to dismiss the appeal. This left the district court's ruling overturning Proposition 8 as the final ruling in the case. Because the appeal was decided on the question of standing, the Supreme Court did not examine nor rule on whether in their view Proposition 8 had violated the U.S. Constitution.

Justice Kennedy, writing for the minority, said the views of the California Supreme Court on the proponents' standing should have been respected, because "the basic premise of the initiative process [and] the essence of democracy is that the right to make law rests in the people and flows to the government, not the other way around".

=== Aftermath ===
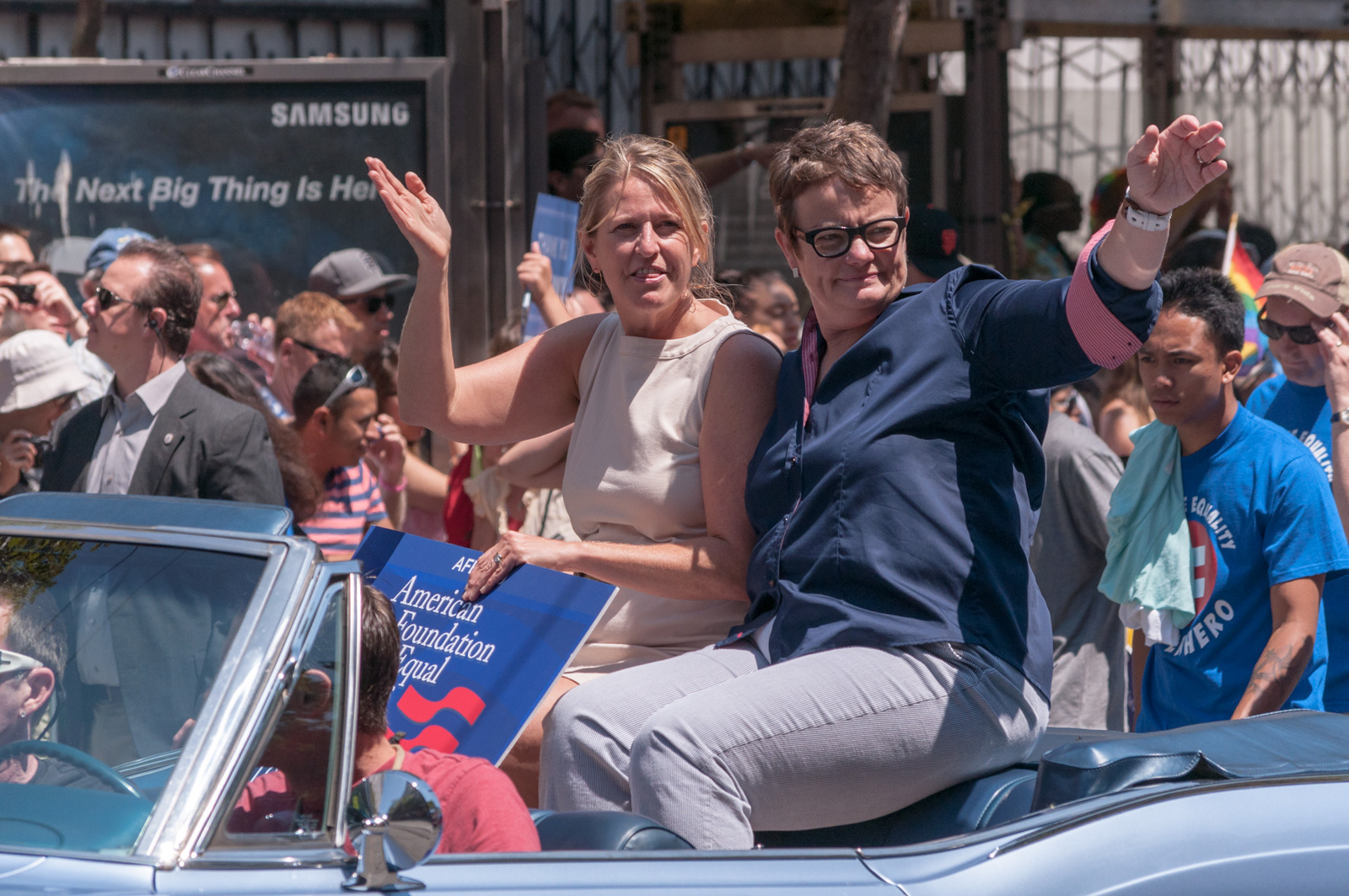
Plaintiffs Perry and Stier at the June 30, 2013, Pride Parade in San Francisco after their marriage

On June 28, 2013, the Ninth Circuit lifted its stay of the district court's ruling, enabling same-sex marriages to resume; minutes afterward, plaintiffs Perry and Stier became the first couple in California to legally wed under state law since the enactment of Proposition 8 in 2008, doing so at San Francisco City Hall at 4:45 PDT, with California's Attorney General Kamala Harris officiating at the ceremony.

There were two legal challenges made to the implementation of the ruling, both subsequently denied:

==== Federal court legal challenge to removal of stay ====
On June 29, 2013, the proponents of Proposition 8 filed an emergency motion with the U.S. Supreme Court to vacate the Ninth Circuit's lifting of its stay, claiming it had been "premature". The next day, June 30, 2013, U.S. Supreme Court Justice Anthony Kennedy, responsible for overseeing the Ninth Circuit, denied the motion without comment.

==== State court legal challenges to statewide implementation of ruling ====
Even before the Ninth Circuit lifted its stay, Proposition 8 proponents had expressed the intent to fight on, by asserting that the ruling only applies to the persons or counties involved and would be unlawful for other couples or counties to comply with it.

Two petitions to this effect were filed with the California Supreme Court, by proponents (Hollingsworth v. O'Connell and Brown, July 12, 2013) and—against county policy—by a San Diego County Clerk (Dronenburg, July 19, 2013: dropped August 2 as duplicative). The proponents' petition challenged the state and county clerk responses to the ruling in Perry, asserting that, in their view, only two counties were affected by the ruling and other counties had no legal capacity to discretionally do likewise; that the plaintiffs, not representing a class, had their relief while others who were not plaintiffs had no change to their position within the law; and that county clerks were not in fact covered by the ruling and were therefore bound to comply with the law as it stood.

This position was rejected by California's governor, who on legal advice ordered the change to license issuance, according to the ruling. California's Attorney General Kamala Harris noted that "state officials are obligated to govern marriage equally in all counties and that [United States District Court for the Northern District of California Chief Judge Vaughn] Walker's ruling specifically covers those officials." San Francisco's city attorney stated that it was "the most basic concepts of American law ... that a state court will not overrule the federal judiciary". Twenty-four County Clerks stated, through their lawyer, that their role was "ultimately state supervised" and it would be unfeasible to have a "patchwork" of different marriage criteria varying between the counties of a single state.

On July 15, the California Supreme Court unanimously declined the request to order an immediate halt to same-sex marriages in the state pending a decision on the petition. The court requested arguments from the parties on the points raised in their petition. On August 14, 2013, the California Supreme Court unanimously rejected the challenge by Proposition 8 proponents.

== Repeal ==
=== 2009–2022 ===
On April 30, 2009, the members of 'Yes! on Equality' submitted a ballot initiative dubbed "California Marriage Equality Act" to the Attorney General's office, requesting a title and summary. The text of the ballot would repeal Article I, Section 7.5 of the Californian Constitution as well as clarifying that no school curriculum will be changed and no clergy will be forced to perform any "service or duty incongruent with their faith". Yes! on Equality had until August 17, 2009, to gather 694,354 signatures in order to qualify for the June 2010 ballot. A petition for initiative for the November 2010 ballot also failed to obtain enough signatures.

Several LGBTQ groups of color (including API Equality-LA, HONOR PAC, and the Jordan/Rustin Coalition) published a statement "Prepare to Prevail", in which they argued that the ballot repeal effort should be delayed until 2012. The repeal effort was subsequently canceled in light of victorious court cases.

=== 2024 repeal ===
On February 14, 2023, following comments by Clarence Thomas in the U.S. Supreme Court decision Dobbs v. Jackson Women's Health Organization that called for the court to review Obergefell v. Hodges, lawmaker Evan Low introduced ACA-5 into the California legislature. A legislatively referred constitutional amendment repealing the ban on same-sex marriage was proposed for the 2024 California elections; activists stated that 2024 would be the appropriate time for a ballot measure to prevent public competition for attention with 2022 California Proposition 1.

In June 2023, the California State Assembly passed ACA-5 in a unanimous vote, and the following month another unanimous vote took place in the California State Senate, therefore placing the proposal to repeal Proposition 8 on the ballot in 2024. The measure was approved by over 61% of voters. The text of the Constitution was changed to read: "the right to marry is a fundamental right".

== See also ==
- Proposition 22
- Briggs Initiative
- Houston Proposition 1 (2015)—a veto referendum which led to the repealing of an ordinance protecting LGBTQ rights.
- LGBTQ rights in California
- List of former U.S. state constitutional amendments banning same-sex unions by type
- Obergefell v. Hodges—a 2015 U.S. Supreme Court case holding that the right to marry is guaranteed to same-sex couples.
- San Francisco 2004 same-sex weddings—a prior controversy that sparked In re Marriage Cases and led to Proposition 8
- SaveCalifornia.com
- United States v. Windsor—a 2013 U.S. Supreme Court case, decided along with Hollingsworth v. Perry, that struck down Section 3 of the Defense of Marriage Act, thereby granting federal benefits to same sex couple who are married under state law
- 8 (or 8 the Play)—an American play that portrays the closing arguments of Perry v. Schwarzenegger, the federal trial that led to the overturn of Proposition 8
