= AP VoteCast =

Logo of AP VoteCast

AP VoteCast was a survey of American voters and nonvoters administered by NORC at the University of Chicago originally for media networks the Associated Press (AP) and Fox News (referred to by the network as the Fox News Voter Analysis.) The survey was created by Fox, the AP and NORC as a new way to survey voters and would additionally be used in later elections by outlets including NPR, PBS NewsHour, Univision News, USA Today, and The Wall Street Journal.

VoteCast was first used in the 2018 midterm elections. The AP, NORC and Fox tested the new approach for the 2017 gubernatorial elections in New Jersey and Virginia, as well as the Senate election in Alabama. Prior to AP VoteCast, the original methodology of exit polls involved conducting in-person interviews as voters left the polls. AP VoteCast's methodology attempted to account for the increasing number of vote-by-mail voters, by moving away from in-person only exit polls. The project intended to improve the reliability of data and overcome exit poll biases. The survey used online and telephone interviews to reach voters.

The AP and Fox News formerly were part of the National Election Pool, but have not collaborated on polling for presidential or midterm elections since 2016. Following SSRS's 2025 acquisition of Edison Research, the networks that make up the National Election Pool joined the AP and Fox to survey voters for the elections held that year. The Voter Poll by SSRS will also be used to survey voters during the 2026 elections.
