= National Election Pool =

Consortium of American news organizations

The National Election Pool (NEP), later The Voter Poll by SSRS , is a consortium of American news organizations formed in 2003 to provide exit polling information for US elections, replacing the Voter News Service following the latter's disbandment the same year.

The system produced skewed results in the 2004 US presidential election and in the 2016 presidential election.

Member companies ABC News, CBS News, CNN, and NBC News are in a contract with Edison Research to conduct exit polling and a quick turnaround of nationwide vote tabulation. Starting in 2020, Reuters has used the NEP for U.S. presidential election results and exit polls. Fox News and the Associated Press were part of the Pool, but left in 2017 due to plans to conduct their exit polls and other experimental alternatives to gauge voter sentiment. These two networks used AP VoteCast from 2018 to 2024. In 2025, after SSRS acquired Edison Research, the AP and Fox News rejoined the consortium to survey voters for that year's off-year elections.

The organizers of the pool say that the purpose of their quick collection of exit poll data is not to determine if an election is flawed, but rather to project winners of races. Despite past problems, they note that all of their members have correctly called a winner since the current system was put in place. However, to avoid the premature leaking of data, collection is now done in a "Quarantine Room" at an undisclosed location in New York. All participants are stripped of outside communication devices until it is time for information to be released officially.

Before the 2020 presidential election, exit polls were primarily conducted using in-person interviews with voters who cast their ballot on Election Day. Due to the coronavirus pandemic, exit pollsters in 2020 wore masks and were told to remain at least six feet away from participating voters. For the 2020 election, pollsters also interviewed respondents at early voting locations and included telephone polling as part of their methodology. For the 2022 midterm elections, exit pollsters continued to interview voters as they left voting locations on Election Day and places where early voting took place. Telephone interviews were also used. The methodology was mostly the same for the 2024 election, but voters were also reached through email and text. The Voter Poll by SSRS, established in 2025 for that year's off-year elections, was conducted using online and telephone interviews to reach voters, along with in-person interviews at 30 precincts.

== See also ==
- Warren Mitofsky
