= LGBTQ rights in California =

- California (US)
- Legal status: Legal since 1976
- Gender identity: Transgender persons allowed to change legal gender
- Discrimination protections: Sexual orientation and gender identity or expression protections (see below)

Family rights
- Recognition of relationships: Domestic partnerships since 1999; Same-sex marriage since 2013
- Adoption: Full adoption rights since 2003

California is seen as one of the most liberal states in the U.S. in regard to lesbian, gay, bisexual, transgender, and queer (LGBTQ) rights, which have received nationwide recognition since the 1970s. Same-sex sexual activity has been legal in the state since 1976. Discrimination protections regarding sexual orientation and gender identity or expression were adopted statewide in 2003. Transgender people are also permitted to change their legal gender on official documents without any medical interventions, and mental health providers are prohibited from engaging in conversion therapy on minors.

California became the first state in the U.S. to legalize domestic partnerships between same-sex couples in 1999. Same-sex marriage was legalized in 2008 for five months until voters approved a ban in November of the same year. After the U.S. Supreme Court refused to recognize the legal standing of same-sex marriage opponents on June 26, 2013, the ban was no longer enforceable, allowing same-sex marriages to recommence starting on June 28. Same-sex adoption has also been legal statewide since 2003, permitting stepchild adoption and joint adoption between same-sex couples. On November 5, 2024, California voters passed Proposition 3, a constitutional amendment that enshrined the right to same-sex marriage in the state constitution. The measure passed by 63%. This was the second state to do so; after Nevada.

In 2014, California became the first state in the U.S. to officially ban the use of gay panic and transgender panic defenses in murder trials. Public schools are also required to teach about the history of the LGBTQ community and transgender students are allowed to choose the appropriate restroom or sports team that match their gender identity. Most support for LGBTQ rights can be seen in the largest cities, such as Los Angeles, San Diego, and San Francisco, as well as many cities on the Pacific coast. A 2017 survey from the Public Religion Research Institute showed that 66% of Californians supported same-sex marriage. Since November 2022, 10% of the individuals within the California Legislature are LGBTQ members immediately after the elections—a record first for the United States. In July 2024, a newly implemented law went into effect a first for the United States—explicitly banning outing of LGBTQ individuals within public schools.

== History and legality of same-sex sexual activity ==
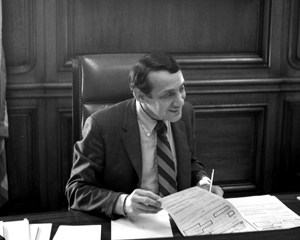
Harvey Milk was one of the earliest known LGBTQ activists in California and the United States, and the first LGBTQ elected official in the state.

Prior to European settlement and colonization in the 18th century, numerous Native American groups lived in the region. Among these, many recognize a "third gender" role in their societies (nowadays also called "two-spirit"). Male-bodied individuals who behave and act as women and perform typically feminine tasks are known as yaawa among the Atsugewi, kwit or cuit among the Luiseño, tüdayapi among the Northern Paiute, clele among the Wailaki, 'aqi among the Chumash, wergern among the Yurok, and í-wa-musp among the Yuki people. Female-to-male individuals are known as brumaiwi among the Astugewi and musp-íwap náip among the Yuki. Similarly, among the Nomlaki and the Klamath and Modoc peoples, respectively, walusa and t'winiːq individuals form a "third gender" alongside male and female. The Yokuts recognize similar terms. In the Kings River Yokuts language, it is tonoo'tcim, whereas it is tonocim in the Palewyami language. There were no known legal or social punishments for engaging in homosexual activity in these societies.

Sodomy laws were first enacted during the Spanish period. The general openness or indifference towards homosexuality quickly disappeared with the arrival of Christianity, which has traditionally regarded homosexuality as sinful. In 1850, shortly after having joined the United States, California adopted a criminal code prohibiting sodomy, both heterosexual and homosexual, with 1 to 14 years' imprisonment. Over the following years, numerous people were convicted of sodomy, and the state law was amended to include fellatio (oral sex) and cunnilingus in 1915.

In 1909, California passed a law providing for the possible sterilization of "moral or sexual perverts". By 1948, 19,042 people had been sterilized under the law. In 1950, the state Attorney General issued an opinion that sterilization of inmates for reasons other than therapeutic was probably unconstitutional. At that time, California accounted for the most sterilization cases of any state, having more than all states combined. In 1951, the law was amended to remove "perversion" as a ground for sterilization.

From the mid-20th century onwards, debate surrounding the sodomy law became increasingly more mainstream. A bill was introduced in 1975 to repeal the state's sodomy statute.

In 1972 and 1974, California voters opted to amend the State Constitution's Declaration of Rights to include "inalienable rights" such as "life and liberty, acquiring, possessing, and protecting property, and pursuing and obtaining safety, happiness, and privacy." A consenting adult law for residents over 18 years old, which restricted existing laws on sodomy or oral copulation for same-sex or opposite-sex couples to genuinely criminal instances alone, was passed in May 1975 and took effect the following year.

Following on from this, a discrepancy involving the age of consent nonetheless continued to exist under Californian law. Up until September 2020, Californian law stated that if an adult was convicted of consensual vaginal intercourse with a minor between the age of 14 and 17, and if the adult was within 10 years of the minor, the judge could decide whether the person should be listed on the sex offender registry. On the other hand, if a gay man had consensual sex with a minor, 14 to 17, Californian law continued to state that he must be placed on the sex offender list regardless. In September 2019, a bill to rectify this unequal treatment was blocked in the California Assembly by Lorena Gonzalez. In August 2020, state Senator Scott Wiener then sought to immediately close this legal loophole within California law explicitly discriminating against LGBTQ minorities. Following on from this, Wiener experienced a period of abuse and harassment directed toward him by certain individuals within the community, including death threats and accusations of pedophilia. In September 2020 - effective from January 1, 2021 - the senate bill (SB145) was passed with a supermajority and signed into law by both the California State Legislature and Governor Gavin Newsom that legally repealed the age of consent discrimination discrepancy established from 1975.

=== Bayard Rustin ===
In February 2020, the LGBTQ civil rights activist Bayard Rustin was posthumously pardoned by Governor Gavin Newsom. California is currently considering a law to pardon gay and bisexual men convicted under the state's historical anti-gay law, similar to the UK's Alan Turing law.

=== Military records corrected ===
In September 2022, the Governor signed into law a bill that passed the California Legislature to automatically correct military records (during the pre-2011 DADT era) - so that LGBTQ individuals who served as veterans can now legally access military benefits. New York State, Rhode Island and Connecticut have similar laws.

== Gay pride rainbow flag ==
California was the origin of the gay pride rainbow flag in 1978 by Gilbert Baker. In September 2023, some education and school districts within California have banned the gay pride rainbow flag - via localities from school boards.

== Recognition of same-sex relationships ==
From the enactment of legislation in 1971 to replace gendered pronouns with gender-neutral pronouns until 1977, the California Civil Code defined marriage as "a personal relation arising out of a civil contract, to which the consent of the parties capable of making that contract is necessary." This definition was uniformly interpreted as including only opposite-sex partners, but, because of worries that the language was unclear, Assembly Bill No. 607, authored by Assemblyman Bruce Nestande, was proposed and later passed to "prohibit persons of the same sex from entering lawful marriage." The act amended the Civil Code to define marriage as "a personal relation arising out of a civil contract between a man and a woman, to which the consent of the parties capable of making that contract is necessary." Opponents of the bill included Assemblyman Willie Brown (who authored the repeal of California's sodomy law in 1975) and Senator Milton Marks. The bill passed 23–5 in the state Senate and 68–2 in the Assembly. It was signed on August 17, 1977, by Governor Jerry Brown.

In 1985, the city of Berkeley became the first governing entity in the state to recognize same-sex couples legally when it enacted its domestic partnership policy for city and school district employees. The term "domestic partner" was coined by city employee and gay rights activist Tom Brougham, and all other domestic partnership policies enacted in the state in the years since are modeled after Berkeley's policy.

California has provided benefits to same-sex partners of state employees since 1999.

Through the Domestic Partnership Act of 1999, California became the first state in the United States to recognize same-sex relationships in any legal capacity. As of the California Domestic Partner Rights and Responsibilities Act of 2003 (effective January 1, 2005), same-sex civil unions or domestic partnerships performed in other states or countries are considered equivalent to California's domestic partnerships.

Proposition 22, an initiative passed by voters in 2000, forbade the state from recognizing same-sex marriages. This initiative was struck down in May 2008 by the California Supreme Court in In re Marriage Cases, but a few months later, Proposition 8 reinstated California's ban on marriages for same-sex couples. During the time between the California Supreme Court decision and passage of Proposition 8, the state allowed for tens of thousands of marriage licenses to be issued to same-sex couples. Strauss v. Horton affirmed that those marriages were still valid after the passage of Proposition 8. In 2010, a federal district court in Perry v. Schwarzenegger determined that Proposition 8 was unconstitutional due to violations of the Due Process and Equal Protection clauses of the Fourteenth Amendment to the United States Constitution, but the United States Court of Appeals for the Ninth Circuit ordered a stay of the judgement pending appeal.

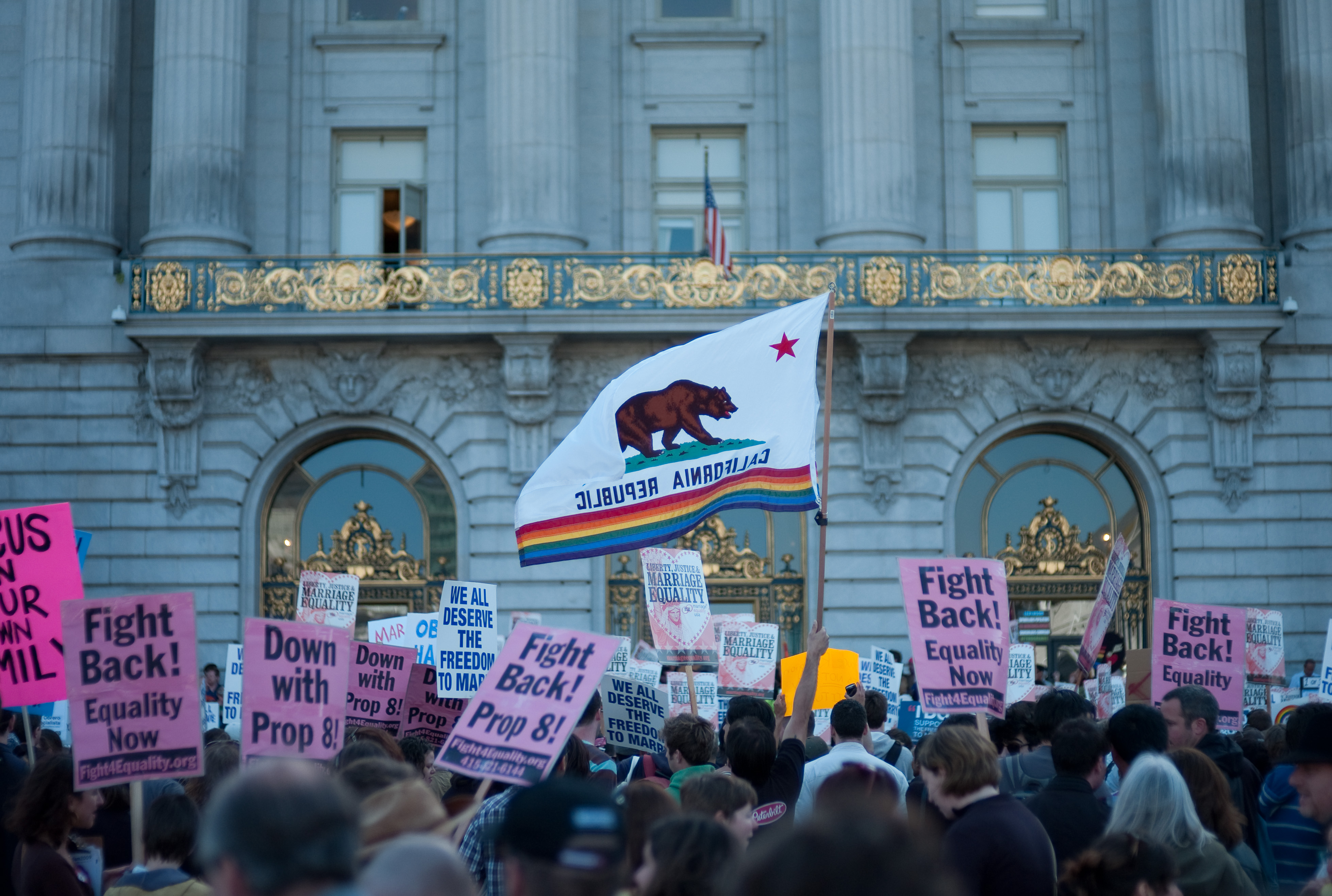
A California LGBTQ flag at a Prop 8 rally

In February 2012, a three-judge panel of the U.S. Court of Appeals for the Ninth Circuit upheld the district court's holding in Perry v. Schwarzenegger that Proposition 8 was unconstitutional, although on narrower grounds. Proposition 8 proponents sought rehearing en banc (meaning review of the decision by a larger panel of Ninth Circuit judges) but this was denied in June 2012. The proponents then petitioned the U.S. Supreme Court to review the Ninth Circuit's decision, and it agreed to do so on December 7, 2012. The Supreme Court issued its ruling on June 26, 2013, effectively upholding the lower courts' determination that Proposition 8 was unconstitutional but doing so on procedural grounds without directly addressing the constitutionality of the measure. Two days later, the lifting of a stay by the U.S. Court of Appeals for the Ninth Circuit allowed same-sex couples to recommence marrying in California.

Efforts were underway for a 2012 referendum to repeal Proposition 8 and amend the State Constitution to allow same-sex couples to marry. However, in February 2012, Love Honor Cherish, the organization gathering signatures for that potential ballot initiative, canceled the effort in light of the fact that the Perry lawsuit was going well for the pro-equality side and an expensive ballot campaign appeared unlikely to be necessary.

SB 1306, introduced in February 2014 by Senator Mark Leno and signed by Governor Jerry Brown in July 2014, updated the Family Code to reflect same-sex marriage in California. It removed unenforceable and discriminatory language against same-sex couples, such as Proposition 22 (2000) and AB 607 (1977), and also modernized the entire code by replacing references to "husband" and "wife" with "spouse(s)".

=== The Marriage Recognition and Family Protection Act ===
On October 12, 2009, following the passage of Proposition 8, Governor Arnold Schwarzenegger signed into law The Marriage Recognition and Family Protection Act (SB 54), legislation proposed by State Senator Mark Leno. The bill established that some of the same-sex marriages performed outside the state are also recognized by the state of California as "marriage", depending on the date of the union.

Following the passage of Proposition 8, the California Supreme Court Justices affirmed that all same-sex marriages performed in California before the passage of Proposition 8 continued to be valid and recognized as "marriage". The Marriage Recognition and Family Protection Act also established that a same-sex marriage performed outside the state is recognized as "marriage" if it occurred before Proposition 8 took effect. This category also includes same-sex marriages performed before same-sex marriage became legal in California. The act also mandates the full legal recognition of same-sex marriages lawfully performed outside of California after the passage of Proposition 8, with the sole exception that the relationship cannot be designated with the word "marriage". The law provides no label to be used in place of "marriage" to describe these relationships; they are not "domestic partnerships". The resumption of same-sex marriage in California on June 28, 2013, effectively supersedes this law with respect to out-of-state same-sex marriages.

=== SB 1306 (2014) ===
Introduced by Senator Mark Leno on February 21, 2014, SB 1306 repealed Sections 300 (AB 607, 1977), 308 (The Marriage Recognition and Family Protection Act), 308.5 (Proposition 22) of the Family Code, and amended Section 300 to be gender-neutral among other sections as well. The legislation removed the statutory reference to marriage as a union "between a man and a woman" from the state's Family Code and updated the law with gender-neutral terms to apply to same-sex marriages as well as heterosexual ones.

During its passage, some concern was expressed that, by repealing the same-sex marriage ban, SB 1306 breached the separation of powers as the State Assembly would be repealing an initiative passed by the voters. However, the consensus of the Assembly Judiciary Committee was that the voters are no more able to pass an unconstitutional, and subsequently enjoined, statute any more than the Assembly can. In light of In Re Marriage Cases and Hollingsworth v. Perry, which collectively forbade the enforcement of any law which would prohibit same-sex couples from marrying, it was determined by the Assembly Judiciary Committee that the Assembly has the capacity to repeal enjoined statutes.

SB 1306 was approved by the Senate Judiciary Committee 5–2 on April 8, 2014. On May 1, 2014, the California State Senate passed the bill on a 25–10 vote. On June 30, it passed the Assembly in a 51–11 vote. It was signed by the Governor on July 7, 2014, and took effect on January 1, 2015. The definition of marriage in California is now the following:

Marriage is a personal relation arising out of a civil contract between two persons, to which the consent of the parties capable of making that contract is necessary.

=== SB 1005 (2016) ===
In April 2016, the state Senate voted 34–2 to approve SB 1005, a bill introduced by Senator Hannah-Beth Jackson that updated California law similarly to SB 1306. The California lower house approved the bill by a vote of 63–1 with amendments, and passed the state Senate by a vote of 34–0. The bill became both engrossed and enrolled, meaning it passed both houses in the same form. The bill was signed into law by Governor Jerry Brown, and went into effect on January 1, 2017.

=== Federal income tax ===
The Internal Revenue Service ruled in May 2010 that its rules governing communal property income for married couples extend to couples who file taxes in a community property state that recognizes domestic partnerships or same-sex marriages. Couples with registered domestic partnerships or in same-sex marriages in California, a community property state, must first combine their annual income and then each must claim half that amount as his or her income for federal tax purposes.

=== Same-sex conjugal visits ===
In June 2007, the California Department of Corrections announced it would allow same-sex conjugal visits becoming the first state to do so. The policy was enacted to comply with a 2005 state law requiring state agencies to give the same rights to domestic partners that heterosexual couples receive. The new rules allow for visits only by registered domestic partners or same-sex married couples who are not themselves incarcerated. Further, the domestic partnership or same-sex marriage must have been established before the prisoner was incarcerated.

=== Video tapes ===
In November 2021, video tapes from the Proposition 8 trials were finally released to the public by a court order - straight from the Ninth Circuit Court of Appeals jurisdiction.

== Adoption, surrogacy and family planning ==
Same-sex adoption has been legal since 2003 and lesbian couples have been allowed to access artificial insemination since 1976.

Both gestational and traditional surrogacy arrangements are recognized as valid in the state of California. In September 2012, Governor Jerry Brown signed several surrogacy bills into law. Gay male couples are permitted to undertake such contracts under the same terms and conditions as different-sex couples.

Lesbian couples have access to in vitro fertilization. State law recognizes the non-genetic, non-gestational mother as a legal parent to a child born via donor insemination. Initially, the couple had to be either married or in a domestic partnership for the non-biological mother to be automatically recognized. However, a law passed in 2019, and taking effect on 1 January 2020, grants automatic recognition for unmarried couples as well.

=== Birth certificate by throuple ===
In 2013, California passed SB 274 (Family Code §7612(c)), legalizing state courts' recognition of more than two parents if the court finds that recognizing only two parents would be detrimental to the child. In 2017, a "polygamous three membered gay male couple" (throuple) within California who had children together - are for the first time within the United States history legally recognised on a birth certificate by a judge.

== Discrimination protections ==
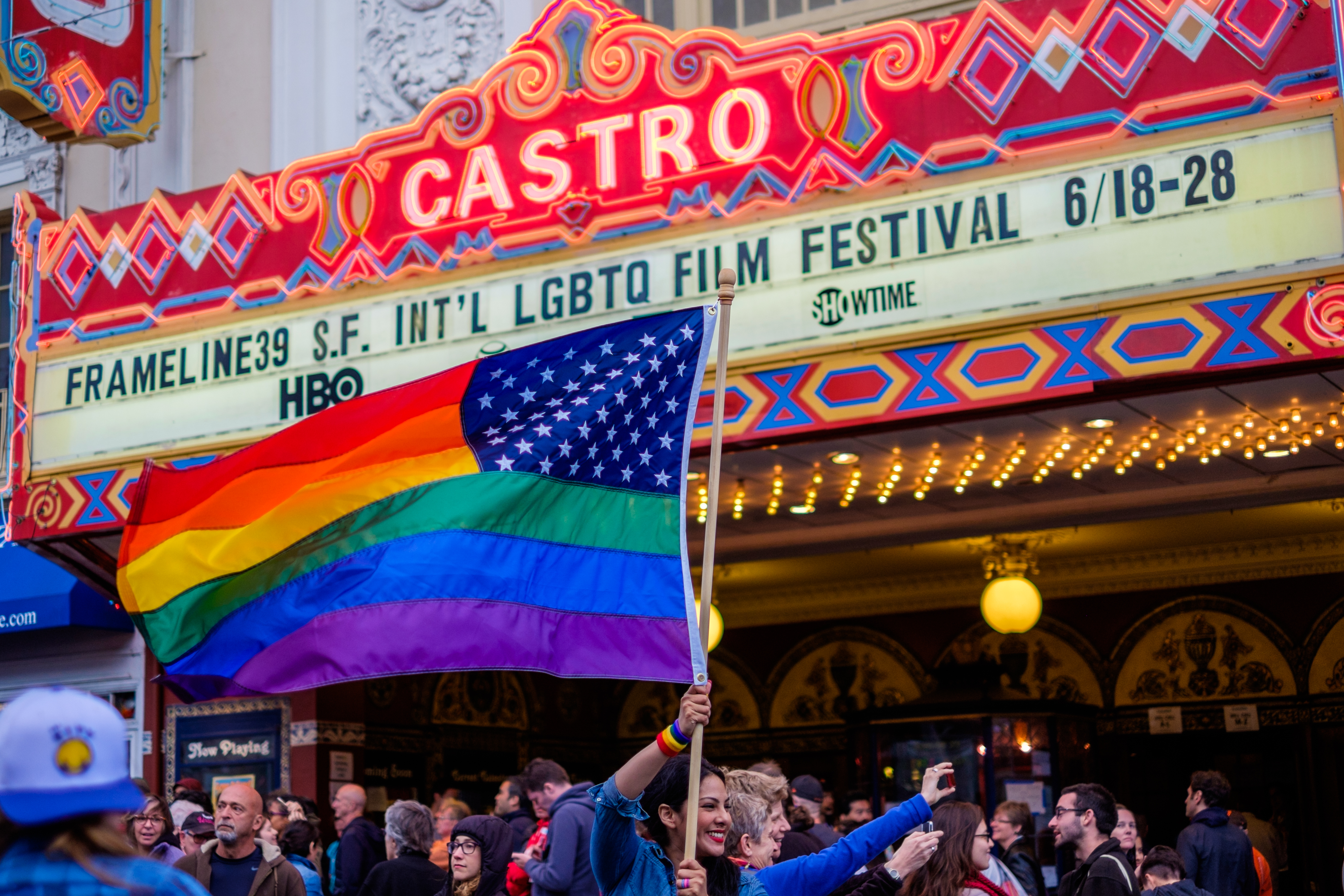
The Castro District is a gay neighborhood in San Francisco, known internationally as a symbol of LGBTQ activism.

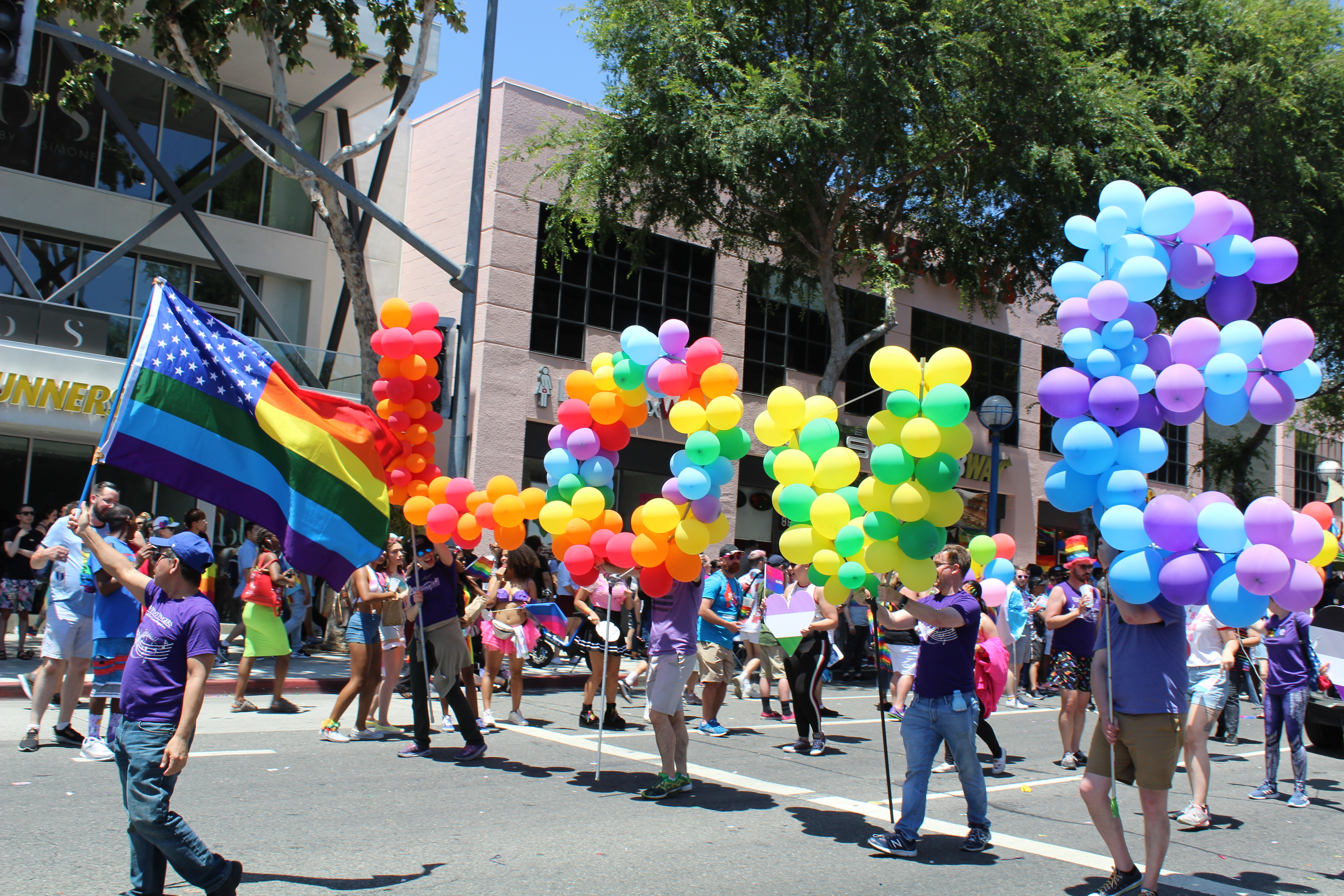
The 2019 edition of Los Angeles Pride

Extensive protections for LGBTQ people exist under California law, particularly for housing, credit, public accommodations, labor and/or employment. In addition, sections of In re Marriage Cases not overturned by Proposition 8 include the establishment of sexual orientation as a "protected class" under California law, requiring heightened scrutiny in discrimination disputes.

In 1979, the California Supreme Court held in Gay Law Students Assn. V. Pacific Tel. & Tel. that public institutions cannot discriminate against homosexuals under Article I, section 7 subdivision (a) of the California Constitution which bars a public utility from engaging in arbitrary employment discrimination.

The Unruh Civil Rights Act, section 51 of the California Civil Code, enacted in 1959, did not expressly include a prohibition against discrimination by businesses based on sexual orientation until 2005; however, California courts interpreted the law to prohibit such discrimination as early as 1984 in Rolon v. Kulwitzky, an interpretation upheld in later decisions as well.

In 1992, after the AB101 Veto Riot, where Governor Pete Wilson vetoed a law which would have guaranteed protections from discrimination on the basis of sexual orientation by private employers, Governor Wilson reversed course and signed legislation which reformed existing California anti-discrimination statutes to cover sexual orientation in employment. The penalties of that bill differed from AB 101 in that the provided penalties were civil rather than criminal in nature. Effective in 2000, AB 1001 further reformed the California Fair Employment and Housing Act of 1959 and broadened employment, housing, and credit protections for gay men, lesbians, and bisexuals. The law was expanded to protect transgender people from unfair discrimination in 2003. In September 2005, Governor Arnold Schwarzenegger signed into law AB 1400, the Civil Rights Act of 2005, ensuring that state laws prohibiting discrimination in public accommodations include gender identity, sexual orientation and marital status.

=== Hate crime law ===
California law clarifies protections against hate crimes based on sexual orientation and gender identity or expression, alongside other categories. State law provides penalty enhancements for a crime motivated by the victim's perceived or actual sexual orientation or gender identity.

=== Gay panic and trans panic defenses ===
In 2014, California became the first state in the U.S. to officially ban the use of gay and transgender panic defenses in murder trials.

=== Jury selection ===
In January 2014, the 9th Circuit Court of Appeals ruled that gay men can't be legally excluded from juries. This came about from a court case from a pharmaceutical company treating HIV, and didn't want a gay man due to being "a conflict of interest".

=== 2020 Licence plate court ruling ===
On November 30, 2020, the Supreme Court of California allowed a gay man to have a license plate with 'QUEER' written on it - on the grounds of freedom of speech under the First Amendment. The California DMV repeatedly denied the gay man the QUEER license plate numerous times over on the grounds of "does not want to stir hatred, offence or ridicule in public".

=== Aged care court ruling ===
In July 2021, the California Court of Appeal made a ruling that “banning certain gender pronouns” within California aged care homes - was in fact a violation of free speech under the First Amendment and that the 2017 California laws was immediately invalided (thus “null and void”). It is subject to ongoing rulings towards the California Supreme Court and possibly all the way to the federal Supreme Court of the United States.

=== California bakery ruling ===
In October 2022, a judge sided with the California bakery based on the First Amendment - who refused to make a wedding cake for a same-sex couple due to Christian beliefs. This ruling is similar and consistent with the Colorado bakery ruling from years ago.

=== False 911 emergency calls ===
In October 2020, the city of San Francisco, by a clear unanimous 11–0 vote (by the San Francisco Board of Supervisors), banned false 911 emergency calls that discriminated against individuals on the basis of sexual orientation and gender identity. Bills have been introduced at a state level within California at various levels and locations, however no action has been taken currently on the bills.

== Transgender and intersex rights ==
In September 2024, a California judge very broadly ruled that transgender minors and children can not forcibly be outed to their parents or guardians - by the schools and within the classroom. Recently legislation that was passed, signed and implemented on this topic, was challenged and put on hold by the federal courts itself.

In March 2024, Sacramento passed a unanimous "transgender sanctuary zone" formal declaration and proclamation. In June 2024, San Francisco did so too.

In California it is legal to change one's sex and name by self determination on documents and forms. Transgender people are permitted to change their legal gender on official documents, such as birth certificates, driver's licenses or IDs. The applicant needs to submit to the California Department of Public Health a certified copy of a court order that changes their sex or an affidavit attesting, under penalty of perjury, that the request for a change of sex is to reflect the applicant's gender identity and not for any fraudulent purposes. State law does not require that the applicant undergo sterilization, Gender-affirming surgery or any medical interventions, but the applicant may undergo such procedures if they wish. In addition, official documents have three sex descriptors, that is "M", "F" and "X".

In 2014, a new law was passed which requires any official responsible for completing a transgender person's death certificate to ensure it represents the deceased person's gender expression, as documented in other government-issued documents or evidenced by gender confirmation medical procedures.

In February 2019, a bill was introduced to the California State Assembly to ban medical interventions on intersex babies, a first for the United States. The bill failed in a Senate committee in January 2020.

In November 2024, The Los Angeles City Council voted unanimously to make the city a "sanctuary city" for LGBTQ youth, gender-affirming care and immigrants. The policy was aimed at combating Project 2025 following Donald Trump's win in the 2024 presidential election.

=== Gender-affirming care protections ===
In 2015, California became the first state to pay gender affirming surgeries for transgender prison inmates.

State law bans health insurance providers from discriminating against transgender patients and from excluding coverage for transgender-specific care. State Medicaid policy also explicitly includes medical transgender-related health care.

At a conference May 3, 2022, California Senator Scott Wiener announced a plan from a coalition of LGBTQ legislations, health care providers, and civil rights groups in the U.S. to introduce legislation providing refuge and support for transgender children fleeing persecution in other states such as Texas and Arizona. Wiener's proposal, Senate Bill 107, would "make it California policy to reject any out-of-state court judgments removing trans kids from their parents' custody for allowing them to receive gender-affirming health care" and "bar compliance in California with any out-of-state subpoena seeking health or other related information about people who come to California to receive gender-affirming care for the purpose of criminalizing such individuals or removing their children from their home". The bill was signed into law on September 29, 2022.

In August 2024, a bill passed the California Legislature to allow more “gender-affirming healthcare medical licensing” for doctors within California. Newsom vetoed the bill due to broader concerns over the bureaucratic impact of expedited licensure of medical personnel.

=== Unisex public restrooms ===
In March 2017, California became the first state in the U.S. to require all single occupancy public restrooms to be marked as gender-neutral.

On September 29, 2022, California became the first state to allow cities to require multi-stall unisex restrooms in buildings which are either newly constructed or undergoing extensive renovation. This law was supported by the City Council of West Hollywood, California, which passed an ordinance to that effect on December 7, 2022.

In September 2023, Governor Gavin Newsom signed a bill into law that would ensure all state-run schools within California provide bathrooms that are "safe, clean, accessible, and gender identity inclusive". This bill went into effect on January 1, 2026.

=== Gender X and gender-neutral pronouns on official documents ===
The California Gender Recognition Act (SB 179), which creates a non binary gender category (the letter “x” or “nb”) on California birth certificates, drivers' licenses, identity cards, and gender-change court orders, was signed into law on October 15, 2017, and became effective on 1 January 2019. In June 2021, two bills (AB439 and AB378) passed the California Legislature, the first to include "gender X" on death certificates - alongside male and female genders and the second to also explicitly include all gender-neutral pronouns for California government employees and office title holders. On July 12, 2021, the Governor of California signed the gender X death certificate bill into law and it became legally effective on January 1, 2022.

From January 1, 2023, California is repealing red tape involved in changing sex on official documents, such as passports. The legislation passed and was signed into law in 2021.

=== Transgender legal protections ===
On July 9 2026, the California Legislature passed a broad, comprehensive and extensive budget appropriations bill that explicitly includes $26 million for gender-affirming healthcare protections - from judicial and executive federal government litigation and liability administrative damages.

In 2014, a new law was passed, according to which doctors, nurses, and other healthcare providers are expected to meet cultural competency standards that include "understanding and applying cultural and ethnic data to the process of clinical care, including, as appropriate, information pertinent to the appropriate treatment of, and provision of care to, the lesbian, gay, bisexual, transgender, and intersex communities."

In July 2022, the Governor of California signed a bill into law effective immediately - to formally repeal an archaic 1970s section on prostitution (unofficially referred to as the "walking while trans" law).

In September 2022, the Governor of California signed a bill into law that passed both houses of the California Legislature- that explicitly legally protects and defends the lives of transgender youth traveling to California (for example who are suicidal or are at risk from other US jurisdictions considered unsafe, discriminatory and/or violent for transgender individuals). The law went into effect immediately within California by an "emergency clause".

In September 2021, the California Legislature passed a bill to explicitly include both sexual orientation and gender identity - within tracking data of violent deaths of LGBTQ individuals. The Governor of California Gavin Newsom signed the bill into law and went into legal effect on January 1, 2022.

=== Sports ===
In May 2025, following threats by President Donald Trump to strip "large scale" federal funds from the state after a 16 year old trans girl qualified for the state finals in track and field, the state of California implemented a policy where any if cisgender female athlete did not advance in their league because a spot they might have secured was instead won by one of California's single digit number of transgender athletes, then they would advance anyway alongside the transgender person. Governor Gavin Newsom's office added shortly thereafter that the 16 year old athlete in question would be scored in a separate category from her cisgender competitors.

On July 9, 2025, the Trump administration sued the state of California for allowing trans girls to compete in girls' school sports, claiming that this policy violates Title IX protections. The lawsuit was filed after the California Department of Education and the California Interscholastic Federation refused to comply with a federal directive to change their policies of including trans athletes and to issue apologies to athletes who lost to trans female competitors.

=== Parental notification and school policies ===
In March 2026, the U.S. Supreme Court, in Mirabelli v. Bonta, granted an emergency request by parents in a challenge to California policies requiring public schools to keep information about a student's gender transition confidential from parents unless the student consents to disclosure. In a per curiam order, the Court held that the parents were likely to succeed on their claims under the Free Exercise Clause and parental rights doctrine. The Court temporarily blocked enforcement of the policies while litigation continues.

== Health ==
=== Conversion Therapy ===
In August 2012, the California State Assembly approved SB 1172 prohibiting mental health providers from engaging in sexual orientation change efforts (such as conversion therapy) with LGBTQ minors. It was signed into law by Governor Jerry Brown on September 29, 2012. The law would have gone into effect January 1, 2013, but was being challenged in Pickup v. Brown and Welch v. Brown.

On August 29, 2013, the U.S. Ninth Circuit Court of Appeals suspended the injunction on SB 1172 and rejected the plaintiffs' claims against allowing the conversion therapy ban to go into effect. On June 26, 2014, the Supreme Court held a conference on whether or not to grant certiorari to Pickup v. Brown. Certiorari was denied by the Supreme Court on June 30, 2014.

In October 2016, the 9th U.S. Circuit Court of Appeals rejected a claim by a Christian minister that the conversion ban violated his free exercise of religion, and this ruling was upheld by the U.S. Supreme Court on May 1, 2017. On December 11, 2023, the U.S. Supreme Court refused to hear a challenge to conversion therapy prohibitions in 22 states including California. The challenge was brought forth by licensed family counselor Brian Tingley with representation from the Alliance Defending Freedom.

AB 2943, was a bill drafted by Assemblyman Evan Low, that would have extended the ban to paid conversion therapy for adults. The bill was approved in 2018 but was later withdrawn by Low before final approval. If passed, the bill would have been the first statewide ban applying to adults.

=== Pediatric healthcare ===
The Children's Hospital L.A.'s Center for Transyouth Health and Development closed in July 2025 under pressure from the 2nd Trump Administration. It was one of the few transgender care programs providing gender affirming procedures on public insurance.

=== HIV law reforms ===
On May 27, 2016, California Governor Jerry Brown signed Senate Bill 1408 into law, effective immediately, that had recently unanimously passed the California State Legislature. The law protects organ donation and transplantation between HIV-positive people in the state of California. The law also protects surgeons who transplant organs from HIV-positive donors into HIV-positive patients from liability and from being penalized by the California Medical Board. This law is also in-line with the federal HIV Organ Policy Equity Act, which reversed the federal ban on this procedure back in 2013.

=== San Francisco bathhouse ban repeal ===
In February 2021, San Francisco repealed a 36-year-old law (during the time of HIV/AIDS) that banned bathhouses.

In July 2021, the Governor of California signed numerous bills into law regarding further HIV law reforms that became legally effective on January 1, 2022.

== Inclusion efforts ==
=== Transgender History Month ===
In August 2021, San Francisco became the first jurisdictional city in the world by proclamation and executive order to officially legally recognize Transgender History Month. Later, in 2023, the California State Assembly approved House Resolution 57, establishing August as Transgender History Month throughout California beginning in August 2024. The Resolution notes that the Compton's Cafeteria Riot occurred in August 1966 in San Francisco, making August a significant month for the trans community.

== Educational inclusion ==
=== Safe Place to Learn Act (2011) ===
The Safe Place to Learn Act, which was signed into law on October 9, 2011, prohibits "discrimination, harassment, intimidation, and bullying based on actual or perceived characteristics including immigration status, disability, gender, gender identity, gender expression, nationality, race or ethnicity, religion, sexual orientation, or association with a person or group with one or more of these actual or perceived characteristics". The state's anti-bullying also includes a prohibition on "cyber sexual bullying", which encourages school districts to inform students about available information and resources regarding the dangers and consequences of bullying. Additionally, the law directs the Department of Education to develop an online help tool to assist all school staff, school administrators, parents, students, and community members in increasing their knowledge of the dynamics of bullying and cyberbullying.

=== FAIR Education Act (2011) ===
The FAIR Education Act is a California law which was signed into law on July 14, 2011. The law compels the inclusion of the political, economic, and social contributions of persons with disabilities and lesbian, gay, bisexual, and transgender people into educational textbooks and the social studies curricula in California public schools by amending the California Education Code. It also amended existing law by adding sexual orientation and religion along with race, ethnicity, nationality, gender, and disability that schools are prohibited from sponsoring negative activities about or teaching students about in an adverse way. The Act mandates that history and social studies classes explore LGBTQ history. This can include reading children's books with same-sex parents or learning about the LGBTQ rights movement, the White Night riots and the Moscone–Milk assassinations, depending on age and grade.

=== School Success and Opportunity Act (2013) ===
The School Success and Opportunity Act, also known as Assembly Bill 1266 or AB 1266, is a bill that was introduced by Assemblyman Tom Ammiano and signed into law by Governor Jerry Brown. The law extended gender identity and expression discrimination protection to transgender and gender-nonconforming students. The bill specifically mentions that classes and activities are to be conducted without regard to one's birth sex as well as allowing transgender students to use bathrooms, locker rooms, and participate in sports that are congruent to their gender identity without regard to the gender they were assigned at birth. The law took effect in January 2014.

The law received a lot of criticism and controversy soon after it was passed. Anti-LGBTQ groups such as the National Organization for Marriage, SaveCalifornia.com, and The Pacific Justice Institute have all supported a petition to have a ballot initiative to overturn the law. The petition was circulated by the Privacy for All Students Coalition which worked with the aforementioned groups. However, the effort to overturn the law failed after it fell "about 17,000 signatures short of the 504,760 valid names needed to go before voters."

=== California Healthy Youth Act (2016) ===
The California Healthy Youth Act 2016 regulates the sex education taught in California schools. Under the Act, the lessons must be "medically accurate" and "age-appropriate". The lessons cover a range of topics, including healthy relationships, how to avoid unintended pregnancies and infection by sexually transmitted diseases, domestic violence, contraceptives, and abstinence. Discussions on sexual orientation also take place in higher grades.

=== AB 1078 (2023) ===
AB 1078, signed September 25, 2023, prohibits school boards from banning or censoring textbooks or school library books which describe racial or LGBTQ+ issues.

== COVID-19 data collection and health care ==
In July 2020, by regulation California became the second US state to collect sexual orientation and gender identity data and statistics on COVID-19 impacts - immediately after Pennsylvania.

In September 2020, the Governor of California Gavin Newsom signed several LGBTQ+ community bills into law previously passed by the California State Legislature - legally effective since January 1, 2021, on explicitly protecting LGBTQ+ health care, COVID-19 data and statistics codification and also housing transgender prisoners.

In December 2020, San Francisco was the last city within California that implemented sexual orientation COVID-19 statistical analysis - when testing individuals or patients for COVID-19.

In March 2021, it was revealed that SOGI (sexual orientation and gender identity) health data was never recorded - despite a 2018 California law making it mandatory and compulsory. A full audit and investigation is underway as to attain why SOGI health data was not ever recorded.

== Boards and companies ==
Since January 1, 2022, all boards and companies within California are legally required to have implemented "minority quotas" of members (such as Native-Americans, African-American, women, immigrants, Hispanic or Latino, LGBTIQ+ individuals, etc.) - under California legislation passed and signed within September 2020. In April 2022, that legislation mentioned within California regarding "private corporations" was formally declared unconstitutional - by a court in Los Angeles.

== State-funded travel ==
Under Assembly Bill 1887, as of June 2021, California will not fund state employees' travel to 17 U.S. states that have discriminatory laws against LGBTQ people. Laws passed, signed and implemented allow this to be done within California back in 2016. In 2021 the US Supreme Court refused to hear a Texas challenge to AB 1887, with Justices Thomas and Alito dissenting.

In September 2023, a bill passed both houses (Assembly vote 64-12 and Senate vote 31–6) of the California Legislature that formally repeals the 7 year old travel-ban legislation that at the time restricted travel to 26 US states. The Governor of California signed the bill on September 13, 2023, effective immediately as an emergency statute.

== Law enforcement ==
Since January 1, 2019, law enforcement in California has been legally required to undergo mandatory sensitivity training on LGBTQ issues, a first for the United States. In September 2021, the California Legislature passed a bill to implement structural reforms as well as legally banning bias within police and law enforcement - on the basis of both sexual orientation and gender identity. The Governor of California Gavin Newsom signed the bill into law, and it went into legal effect on January 1, 2022.

== Public opinion and attitudes ==
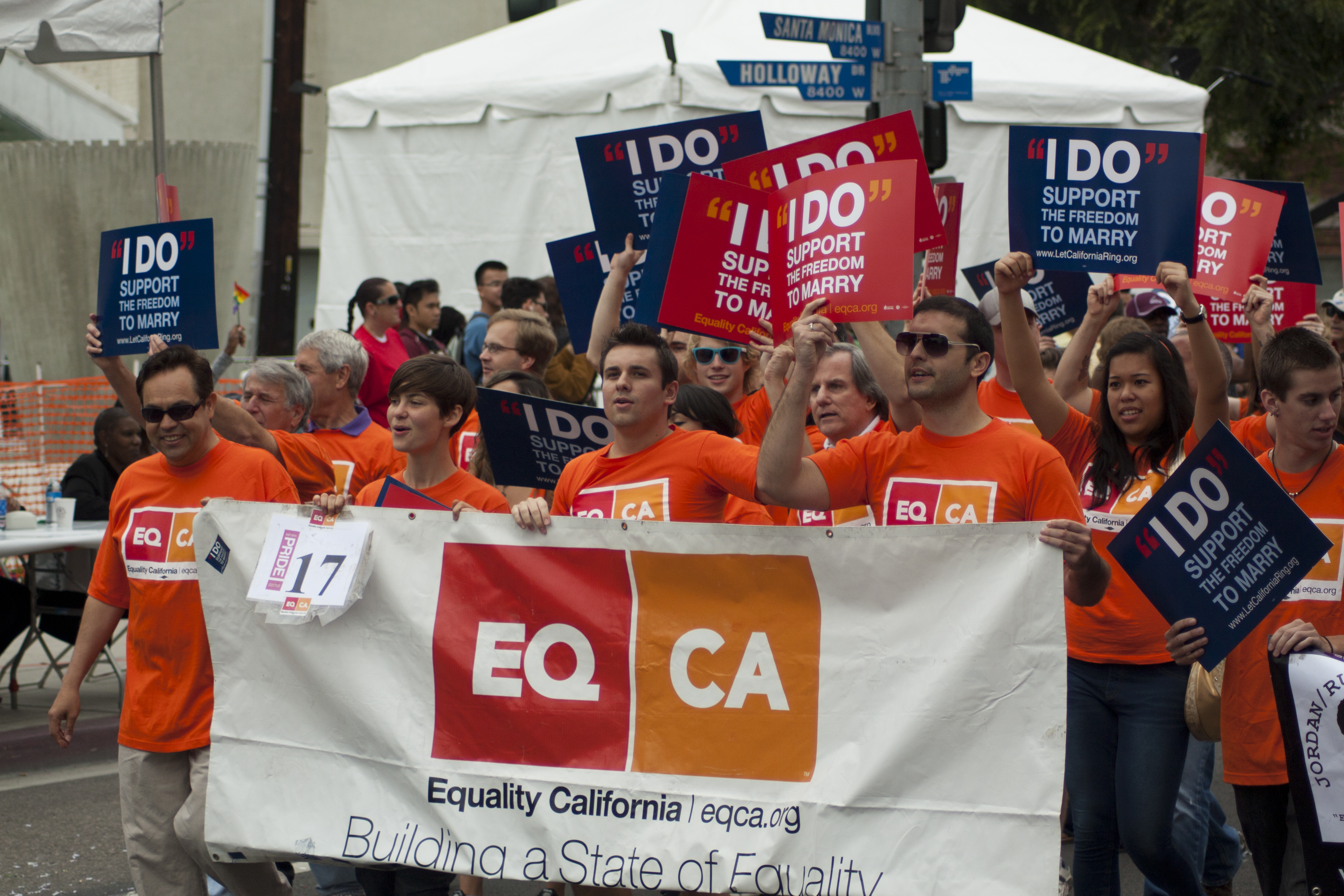
Supporters of same-sex marriage campaigning, June 2011, Los Angeles

Support for LGBTQ rights and same-sex marriage have evolved significantly in the past decades.

The first known opinion poll surveying attitudes toward same-sex marriage in California was commissioned in 1977 by Field Poll. It showed that 28% of Californians supported same-sex marriage, while 59% were opposed. Over the following years, support slowly increased, reaching around 40% in the early 2000s, according to Field Poll. In 2008, Field Poll published a poll showing for the first time in the state's history a majority in favor of same-sex marriage. This majority stabilized during the early 2010s, until reaching 60% in 2013. According to a 2017 Public Religion Research Institute (PRRI), 66% of Californians supported same-sex marriage, whereas 23% were opposed.

The aforementioned PRRI poll also showed that anti-discrimination laws covering sexual orientation and gender identity enjoyed wide popular support. 73% were in favor of such laws, while 20% were opposed. Similarly, 63% of Californians expressed opposition to religious-based refusals to serve LGBTQ people. 28% expressed support.

Public opinion for LGBTQ anti-discrimination laws in California
Poll source	Date(s) administered	Sample size	Margin of error	% support	% opposition	% no opinion
Public Religion Research Institute	January 2-December 30, 2019	5,605	?	76%	18%	6%
Public Religion Research Institute	January 3-December 30, 2018	5,578	?	73%	21%	6%
Public Religion Research Institute	April 5-December 23, 2017	7,260	?	73%	20%	8%
Public Religion Research Institute	April 29, 2015-January 7, 2016	7,671	?	75%	21%	4%

=== Propositions ===
Several LGBT-specific ballot initiatives have been held in California over the years. The first was Proposition 6, the Briggs Initiative, which would have barred gays and lesbians from working in public schools. The initiative failed, despite polls initially showing support by a large margin. In the 2000s, two same-sex marriage initiatives were voted upon, Proposition 22 and Proposition 8, both successful.

==== California ====
Table of California propositions relating to LGBTQ rights
Proposal	Enactment date	Subject	Election date	Electorate	Total votes	(%) (Note: Total votes as a percentage of the electorate)	Yes	(%) (Note: As a percentage of the valid votes (total votes without votes not cast))	No	(%)	Not cast	(%) (Note: Votes not cast as a percentage of the total votes.)	Ref.
Proposition 6	N/A	Employment discrimination in public schools	November 7, 1978	10,129,986	7,132,210	70.4	2,823,293	41.6	3,969,120	58.4	339,797	4.8	
	Restricts gays and lesbians from working in California's public schools. Initiative Constitutional Amendment.												
Proposition 22	March 8, 2000	Prohibiting same-sex marriage	March 7, 2000	14,631,805	7,881,999	51.5	4,618,673	61.4	2,909,370	38.6	353,956	4.5	
	Limit on Marriage. Initiative Statute. Ruled unconstitutional by the Supreme Court of California in In re Marriage Cases on May 15, 2008.												
Proposition 8	November 5, 2008	Prohibiting same-sex marriage	November 4, 2008	17,304,091	13,743,177	79.4	7,001,084	52.2	6,401,482	47.8	340,611	2.5	
	Eliminates Rights of Same-Sex Couples to Marry. Initiative Constitutional Amendment. Ruled unconstitutional by the Supreme Court of the United States in Hollingsworth v. Perry on June 26, 2013. Repealed by Proposition 3 on November 5, 2024.												
Proposition 3	December 18, 2024	Legalizing same-sex marriage	November 5, 2024	22,595,659	16,140,044	71.4	9,477,435	62.6	5,658,187	37.4	1,004,422	6.2	
	Constitutional Right to Marry. Legislative Constitutional Amendment.												

==== Municipal ====
Ballot initiatives on domestic partnerships in San Francisco
Year	Proposition	% of San Francisco voters
November 7, 1989	Proposition S (establish domestic partnerships)	
	Yes	49.5
	No	50.4
November 6, 1990	Proposition K (establish domestic partnerships)	
	Yes	54.4
	No	45.6
November 5, 1991	Proposition K (repeal domestic partnerships)	
	Yes	40.8
	No	59.1
March 2, 2004	Proposition D (expand domestic partnerships)	
	Yes	65.1
	No	34.9

== Summary table ==
Same-sex sexual activity legal and equal age of consent at 18	Yes (Since 1976)
Banning the outing of LGBTQ students within public schools - a first for the United States	Yes (Since 2024)
Same-sex marriages	Yes (Legal for five months in 2008, banned in November 2008, reinstated in 2013, and codified in 2024)
Same-sex civil unions	Yes
Both hate crime and anti-discrimination legislation explicitly covers sexual orientation, gender identity and expression	Yes
Recognition of same-sex couples as domestic partners	Yes (Since 1999)
Lesbian, gay and bisexual people allowed to serve openly in the US military	Yes (Since 2011)
Transgender people allowed to serve openly in the US military	No (Since 2025, by an Executive Order 14183 and a SCOTUS decision)
Right to change legal gender and gender X available on documents (drivers license and birth certificate)	Yes
Intersex minors protected from invasive surgical procedures	Yes (Since 2018)
Conversion therapy banned on minors	Yes (Since 2013)
Gender self-identification	Yes (Since 2019)
Legal recognition of non-binary gender	Yes (Since 2016)
Legal access to single gender-neutral bathrooms	Yes (Since 2017)
LGBTQ anti-bullying law in schools and colleges	Yes
LGBTQ community training required for California law enforcement and police	Yes
LGBT-inclusive sex education and inclusive historical subjects required to be taught in schools	Yes
Gay and trans panic defense banned	Yes (Since 2014)
IVF, adoption, foster parenting and surrogacy available to same-sex couples	Yes
Homosexuality no longer considered a mental illness	Yes
Ban on book bans implemented	Yes
Conjugal visits for same-sex couples	Yes (since 2007)
MSMs allowed to donate blood	Yes (Since 2023 - federal policy)

== See also ==
- Intersex rights in the United States
- LGBTQ history in California
