= Leland Yee =

American criminal and former Democratic California State Senator

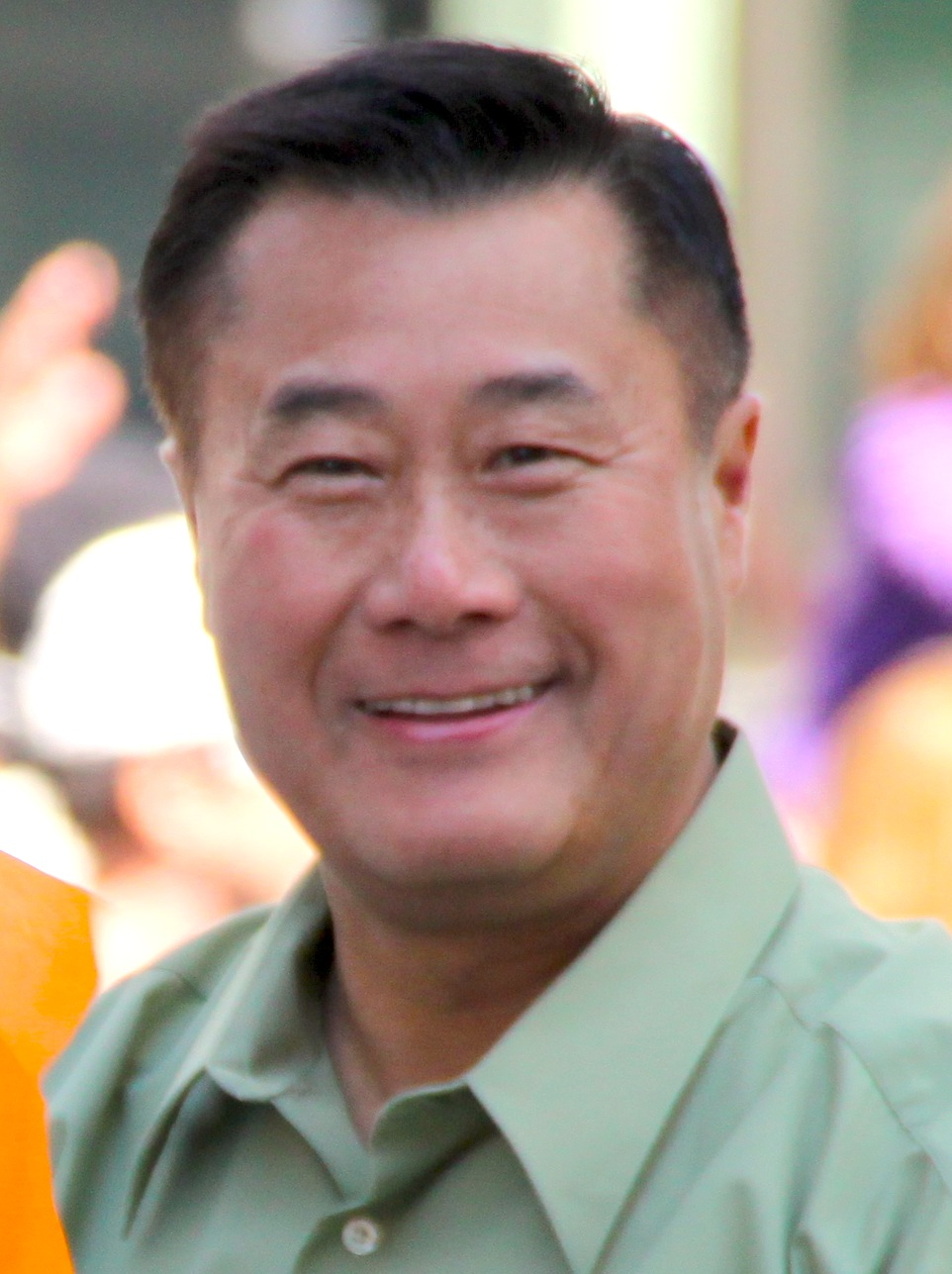
- Yee in 2010

Member of the California State Senate from the 8th district
- In office December 4, 2006 – March 28, 2014
- Preceded by: Jackie Speier
- Succeeded by: Tom Berryhill

Member of the California State Assembly from the 12th district
- In office December 2, 2002 – November 30, 2006
- Preceded by: Kevin Shelley
- Succeeded by: Fiona Ma

Member of the San Francisco Board of Supervisors
- In office January 8, 1997 – December 2, 2002
- Preceded by: Tom Hsieh
- Succeeded by: Fiona Ma
- Constituency: At-large district (1997–2001); 4th district (2001–2002)

Personal details
- Born: Yu Yin Liang; November 20, 1948 (age 78) Toisan, Guangdong, China
- Party: Democratic
- Spouse: Maxine Yee
- Education: University of California, Berkeley (BS); San Francisco State University (MS); University of Hawaii at Manoa (PhD)
- Website: dist08.casen.govoffice.com www.lelandyee.com
- Criminal information
- Status: Released
- Conviction: Racketeering
- Criminal charges: Racketeering; Money laundering; Political corruption; Arms trafficking; Bribery
- Penalty: Five years in federal prison

Chinese name
- Chinese: 余胤良
- Hanyu Pinyin: Yú Yìn Liáng
- Jyutping: Jyu Jan Loeng

Leland Yin Yee (Chinese: 余胤良; Jyutping: jyu4 jan6 loeng4; pinyin: Yú Yìnliáng; born November 20, 1948) is an American former politician who served as a member of the California State Senate for District 8, which covered parts of San Francisco and the Peninsula.

Prior to becoming state senator, Yee was a California State Assemblyman, Supervisor of San Francisco's Sunset District, and President of the San Francisco School Board. In 2004 Yee became the first Asian American to be appointed Speaker pro Tempore, making him the second highest ranking Democrat of the California State Assembly.

On March 26, 2014, Yee was arrested by the Federal Bureau of Investigation (FBI) on charges of public corruption—he had allegedly solicited a $10,000 bribe from an undercover agent in exchange for placing a call to the California Department of Public Health regarding a contract at the organization—and gun trafficking, buying automatic firearms and shoulder-launched missiles from the Moro Islamic Liberation Front (MILF), an Islamist extremist group in the southern Philippines, and attempting to re-sell them to another undercover agent. He was suspended as a Senator on March 28, and he pled guilty to the charges, as well as one of money laundering, on July 1, 2015. On February 24, 2016, Yee was sentenced to five years in federal prison; he was released on June 26, 2020.

== Early life and education ==
Leland Yee immigrated to San Francisco, California from his birthplace of Taishan, Guangdong, China, when he was three years old and later became a naturalized American citizen. His father served in the United States Army and the United States Merchant Marine.

He received his undergraduate degree at the University of California, Berkeley and a master's degree at San Francisco State University before earning his PhD in child psychology at the University of Hawaiʻi at Mānoa in 1975.

== Early career ==
After obtaining his doctorate, Yee worked as a therapist in the Mental Health Department of San Francisco, the Oakland School District and with Asian American for Community Involvement, a non-profit that serves low-income people.

=== San Francisco School Board ===
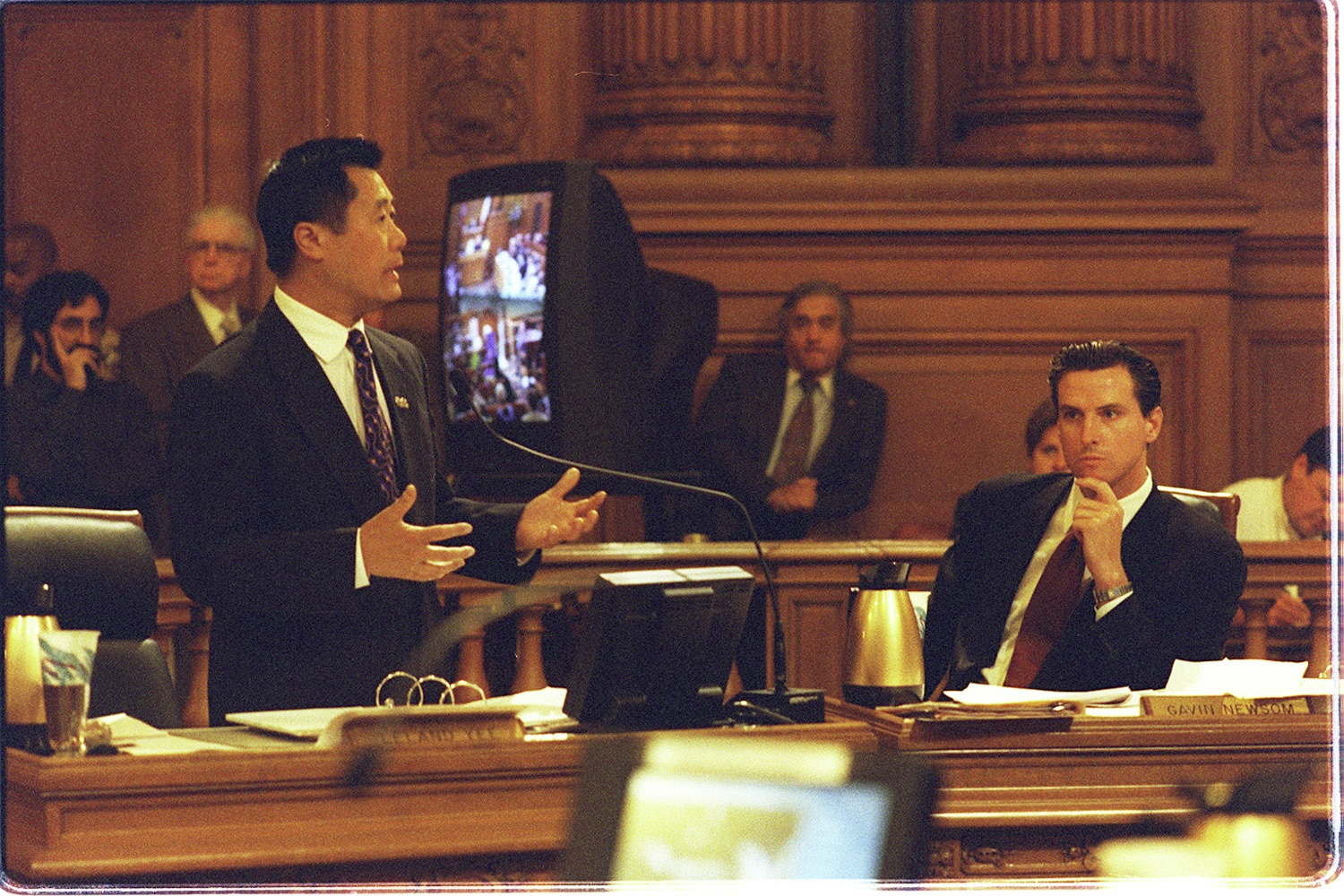
Yee as member of SF Board of Supervisors. Alongside him is then fellow board member Gavin Newsom

Yee was elected to the San Francisco Board of Education in 1988 and served two four-year terms on the board including one as board president. During his tenure, Yee called for audits of all schools in the San Francisco Unified School District and fought to establish performance standards for educators.

==== 1992 ====
In 1992, Yee was arrested for allegedly shoplifting a bottle of tanning oil and gum from the KTA Superstore in Kona's Keauhou Shopping Village. The case was not prosecuted, as Yee disappeared before he could be prosecuted.

=== San Francisco Board of Supervisors ===
Yee was elected to the San Francisco Board of Supervisors in 1996. Representing the city's fourth district, Yee was appointed to chair the Finance Committee, where he helped establish the "Rainy Day" budget reserve and introduced General Obligation Bond Accountability Act. He was re-elected to the board in 2000.

==== 1999 ====
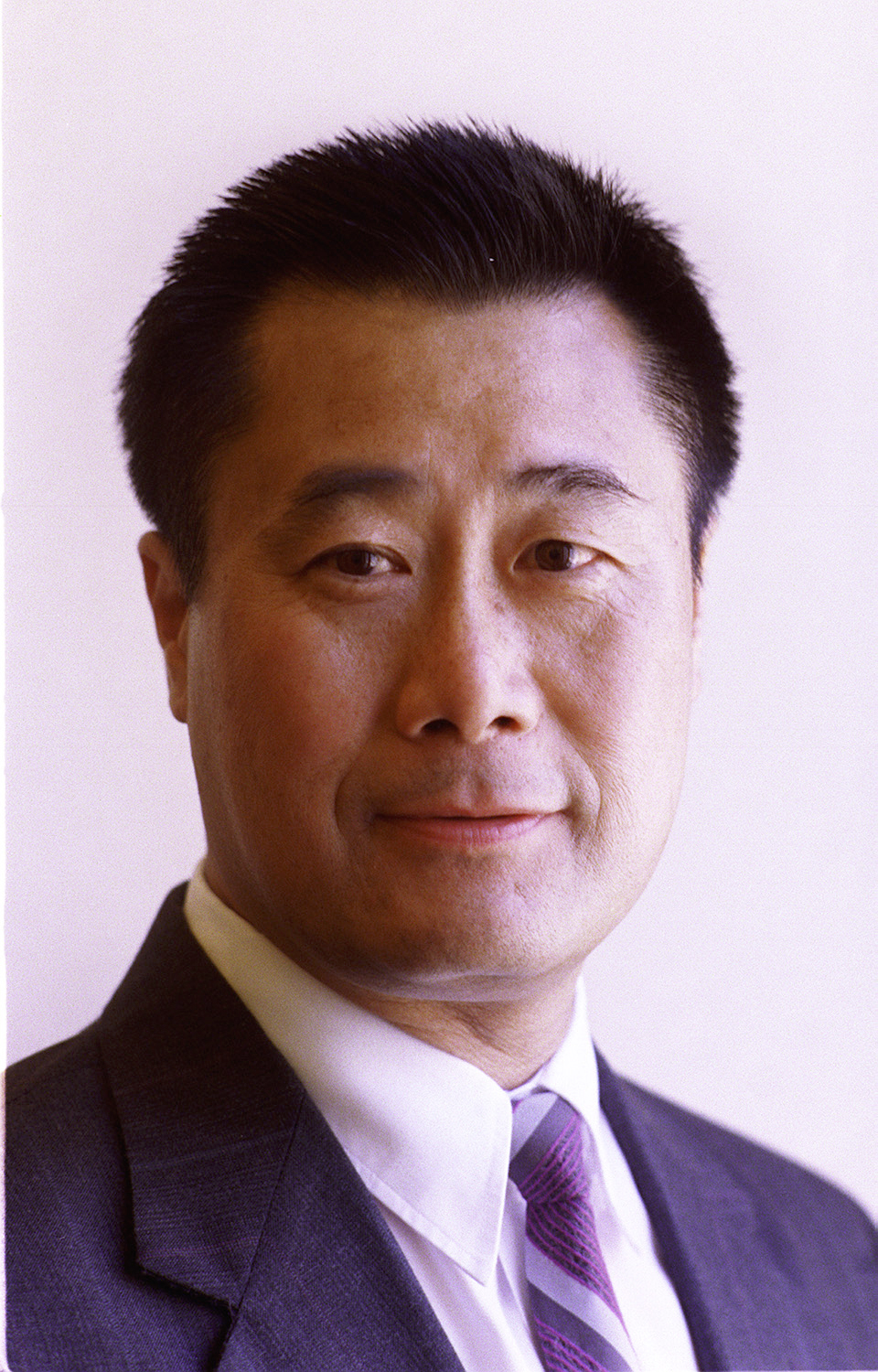
San Francisco Supervisor Leland Yee in 1999

In 1999, Yee was stopped twice by police on suspicion of soliciting prostitutes in San Francisco's Mission District.

=== California Assembly ===
In November 2002, Yee was elected to the California State Assembly to represent the 12th district.

In his first year in the legislature, he was appointed to the Speaker's leadership team as the assistant speaker pro tempore. In 2004, Yee became the first Asian Pacific American to be appointed speaker pro tempore in the California State Assembly and was elected president of the National Asian Pacific American Caucus of State Legislators.

==== 2003 – 2005 ====
In his first term in the legislature, Yee had 15 bills signed into law. These bills include AB 1371 which strengthens informed consent requirements for mentally handicapped patients that take part in medical research.

Yee had 11 bills chartered into law in 2004. Noteworthy bills included AB 2412 which allows part-time community college faculty to access unemployment benefits and AB 3042 which enhances sentences for child prostitution.

Yee had 12 bills chartered into law in 2005. Included in his bill package were AB 800 which ensures a patient's medical records include his/her spoken language, AB 1179 which would have banned the sale of violent video games to children (which was later declared unconstitutional by the US Supreme Court.), and AJR 14 which states that California officially opposes the weakening of the federal offshore oil drilling moratorium

Following news of the "Hot Coffee mod" in Rockstar North's Grand Theft Auto: San Andreas, Yee claimed that the Entertainment Software Rating Board (ESRB) knew about it in advance and criticized them for not rating the game "adults only". The controversy resulted from the Hot Coffee mod created by personal computer users of the game using hacking tools to create a modification to play a "minigame", or game-within-a-game, which was otherwise inaccessible to players. In response, Rockstar removed the content used for the modification. That same year, Yee passed California Assembly Bills 1792 & 1793, a video game bill that criminalizes sale of video games rated M to children under 18 and require retailers to place M-rated games separate from other games intended for children. Yee's bills passed in part to mass media concentration on the speculative link between video game violence and real world violence, as well as several support of concerned parent groups. The bill was signed into law on October 7, 2005, and the Entertainment Software Association (ESA) filed a lawsuit 10 days later. After the bill passed, it was ruled to be unconstitutional by Judge Ronald Whyte. The adverse ruling required the state to pay $324,840 to the ESA in legal fees. (This law was eventually argued before the U.S. Supreme Court in 2010 in Brown v. Entertainment Merchants Association, in which the court struck down the law as unconstitutional.)

==== 2006 ====
Yee had 10 bills signed into law in 2006. Notable bills included AB 1969, which increases renewable energy production in the state, AB 2581, which aims to protect student free speech and prohibit school administrators from censoring school newspapers and broadcast journalism, AB 409, which establishes tighter controls and higher health standards for nail salons, and AB 1207, which adds sexual orientation to the list of protections in the Code of Fair Political Practices.

=== California Senate ===
On June 6, 2006, Yee defeated his opponents Mike Nevin and Lou Papan to win the Democratic nomination for the California State Senate. In the final vote tally certified on June 27, 2006, by San Mateo County Chief Elections Officer Warren Slocum, Yee gathered 51.9 percent, Nevin received 35.4 percent and Papan took 12.7 percent of the vote. Since Jan 1, Nevin spent $887,562.80 of campaign contributions, Yee spent $673,372.59 and Papan ran a modest campaign, spending just $289,862.64. He was elected to the California State Senate in the November 7, 2006 election by a landslide of 77.5% of votes cast. With San Francisco and San Mateo County having a high Democratic base Yee was elected on November 7, 2006. Yee replaced Jackie Speier, who left office due to term limits.

Yee was suspended from the senate in 2014. Yee formerly served on the following Senate committees:

- Appropriations
- Business, Professions and Economic Development
- Governmental Organization
- Human Services
- Labor and Industrial Relations
- Select Committee on Biotechnology
- Select Committee on California's Wine Industry
- Select Committee on California's Horse Racing Industry
- Select Committee on Integrity of Elections
- Select Committee on International Business Trade

Yee formerly chaired the following Senate committees:

- Select Committee on California's Public Record and Open Meeting Laws
- Select Committee on Asian Pacific Islander Affairs
- Select Committee on Bay Area Sustainable Development and Economic Progress

==== Support for gun control ====
Yee was a vocal advocate for gun control, both before and while engaged in gun running. During sentencing, Federal District Judge Charles Beyer called Yee's actions "vile" and the arms dealings particularly "hypocritical" given the politician's history of gun control. In 2006 Yee was named to the Gun Violence Prevention Honor Roll by the Brady Campaign for his efforts that included co-authoring a first-in-the-nation bill to require new semiautomatic handguns be equipped with ballistics identification technology known as microstamping. In May 2012, together with Kevin de León, Yee proposed legislation to ban any semi-automatic rifle that used a bullet button that makes the rifle a "fixed magazine rifle." SB 249 would ban conversion kits and rifles. According to his press release, "Absent this bill, California's assault weapon ban is significantly weakened. For the safety of the general public, we must close this loophole." Yee is quoted as saying, "It is extremely important that individuals in the state of California do not own assault weapons. I mean that is just so crystal clear, there is no debate, no discussion."

==== 2007 ====
Yee had 11 bills signed into law in 2007. Included in these bills was SB 279, making it unlawful to park cars for sale, deemed a public nuisance and traffic hazard, along public roads, SB 190, which brings more transparency to the compensation practices of administrators at the University of California and the California State University, SB 523, which increases the quantity of child support payments collected in San Mateo County, and SCR 52, which declares the legislature "finds that joint governance of the University of California Retirement Plan is necessary to ensure that significant pension plan decisions are based on full and accurate information, to prevent conflicts of interest from impacting the management and performance of the University of California Retirement Plan, and to ensure that the University of California Retirement Plan is financially sound and well managed in a fair and appropriate manner."

On April 12, 2007, Yee criticized the United States Army's plan to spend $2 million in tax dollars to sponsor the Global Gaming League. Yee claims the military individuals on the site are "desensitized to real-life violence through the online violent video games."

On August 29, 2007, Yee again criticized the ESRB, this time for not disclosing what content was removed from Manhunt 2 to re-rate the game from an AO rating for violence to the ESRB Mature rating. Yee asked the Federal Trade Commission to investigate the change in rating. In response, ESRB president Patricia Vance stated the details for a product that has not yet been released will not be disclosed.

==== 2008 ====
Yee had fourteen bills signed into law in 2008. Among these bills, SB 697 prohibits balance billing of patients in the California's Healthy Families program, SB 1217 allows public oversight of the state bar pilots commission, SB 1356, which aims to protect victims of domestic violence from the threat of jail when they refrain from testifying against their abuser in court, SB 1370, which protects teachers from the retaliatory action of school officials as a result of student speech, SB 1696, which states that contracts between a government and a private entity should be subject to the same disclosure requirements as other public records, and SB 1419, which creates a double-fine zone on 19th and Van Ness Avenues—an area with a historically high pedestrian collision rate.

Yee and Assemblyman Ted Lieu of Los Angeles challenged the legality of the LPGA's English language policy, resulting in a revision of policy by the end of 2008. Yee introduced SB 242, prohibiting businesses from denying services to customers that don't speak English (a modification of the Unruh Civil Rights Act). in California. The bill was vetoed by Governor Arnold Schwarzenegger on October 11, 2009.

On January 23, 2008, during a committee meeting, Yee announced his opposition to the health care plan sponsored by Governor Schwarzenegger and supported by a majority of Democrats in the California State House and Senate, while opposed by a majority of Republicans. Yee's opposition along with the opposition of Democratic Senator and Health Committee Chair Sheila Kuehl led the New York Times to predict that California's healthcare bill would be effectively killed.

==== 2009 ====
Yee had 9 bills signed into law in 2009. He wrote SB 340, which requires businesses to list all automatic renewal offer terms and obtain customer approval, SB 13, which provides $16.3 million for domestic violence shelters, SB 786, which preserves an individual's right to enforce open government laws, and SB 447, which reforms the criminal background check laws for people seeking employment at youth organizations.

On July 22, 2009, Yee filed an amicus brief in support of Governor Schwarzenegger's appeal to the Supreme Court regarding the passing of a law that would criminalize the sale of "ultraviolent" video games to minors, claiming that unlike books, movies and CDs, video games "can contain up to 800 hours of footage with the most atrocious content often reserved for the highest levels and can be accessed only by advanced players after hours upon hours of progressive mastery.". This action has been met with criticism from gamers that the Californian state senator is wasting resources on a law already judged unconstitutional at a time when the state is already facing economic problems

==== 2010 ====
In 2010 Yee introduced SB 1451, a bill that ensures California students do not learn from a modified curriculum designed by Texas-based textbook publishers. He wrote SB 399, a bill that would give a juvenile sentenced to life in prison without parole, the right to ask for a court review after ten years. He also introduced SB 920, a bill allowing Californians to opt out of having phone books delivered to their homes. The Senate rejected the bill, however.

The remainder of Yee's bill package focuses on consumer protection, child safety, government transparency, and domestic violence prevention None of his bills have been signed into law this year. Yee was also the third largest taxpayer-funded gas card spender in the senate for 2010 costing $5,314.66. A spokesman said he commutes daily from the state Capitol to his district to hold daily and evening meetings to better serve his constituents.

In April 2010, Yee filed a public records request to discover if any state funds were used by California State Stanislaus Foundation to hire and pay former Alaska Governor Sarah Palin $75,000 to speak at the school's 50th anniversary celebration on June 25. The foundation refused to divulge any information about the fees paid to Palin.

In response, Yee introduced SB 330, which would require groups to abide by California's Public Records Act. On May 28, 2010, the Los Angeles Times reported that two California State sources disclosed that Sarah Palin would receive $75,000 for her speaking engagement. Officials would not confirm the amount of the disclosure. In response to the disclosure, Yee said, "It's rather disappointing that Sarah Palin is asking for nearly $100,000 to speak at this anniversary event when we're looking at state increases in student fees, cancellations of classes and the fact that this money could be going to scholarships… She could do wonders for all of us ... by taking this money and donating it back to the foundation." The fundraising gala raised a then record $200,000 profit for the Cal State Stanislaus Foundation.

==== 2011 ====
California State Assemblyman Paul Fong had introduced Assembly Bill 376, a law intended to ban a method of harvesting shark fins, but the details of which also stipulates that any commercial or culinary use of any shark's fin become banned, in particular shark fin soup, which Assemblyman Fong describes as: "Anything that is unhealthy, that the culture is practicing, we should stop doing it. We used to bind women's feet and that was unhealthy for the woman". In what may be a described as a cynical analogy with a long obsolete practice of foot binding is echoed by Hawaii's former first lady Vicky Cayetano who states that: "shark fin soup is about as cultural as bound feet", however, Senator Leland Yee, while voicing his concern about the illegal shark finning trade, argued that the mentality behind AB376 constitutes "the wrong approach and an unfair attack on Asian culture and cuisine ... rather than launch just another attack on Asian American culture, the proponents of the (blanket) ban on shark fin soup should work with us to strengthen conservation efforts". Critics said the bill unfairly targeted the Chinese-American community because it only restricts the sale of shark fins, which are used almost exclusively in Chinese cuisine. The bill does not apply to other shark products like oil or meat. "I think what is most insidious about this particular bill is that it sends a very bad message, not only to us in California but to the rest of the world, that discrimination against Chinese-Americans is OK," Yee said.

On January 19, 2011, conservative political commentator Rush Limbaugh mocked Chinese president Hu Jintao during his visit to the White House on his radio show. "Hu Jintao — he was speaking and they weren't translating. They normally translate every couple of words. Hu Jintao was just going ching chong, ching chong cha," said Limbaugh, who imitated Hu's speech. Yee criticized Limbaugh for his remarks: "His classless act is an insult to over 3,000 years of cultural history, and is a slap in the face to the millions of Chinese Americans who have struggled in this country and to a people who constitute one-quarter of the world's population." He demanded an apology from Limbaugh for what he and others view as racist and derogatory remarks. He also organized with civil rights groups—including Chinese for Affirmative Action, Japanese American Citizens League and the California National Organization for Women—to boycott companies that advertise on Limbaugh's talk show. Yee states he has received threatening messages and also received a fax from an unknown sender who made racist comments and labeling him a Marxist.

==== 2014 ====
On January 30, 2014, Yee voted in favor of California Senate Constitutional Amendment 5. The proposed bill asked California voters to repeal provisions of Proposition 209 and to permit state universities to consider an applicant's race, ethnicity or national origin in making admissions decisions. After hearing strong opposition to the bill from Asian-American community, Yee, along with Senators Carol Liu and Ted Lieu who had also voted for the bill, jointly issued a statement on February 27, calling for the bill to be withheld pending further consultations with the "affected communities."

=== Arrest and conviction on corruption charges and arms trafficking ===
An affidavit was filed on March 14, 2014, and unsealed on March 26, 2014, charging Yee with violating Title 18 United States Code Section 1343 and 1346 for honest services wire fraud by allegedly taking bribes from Well Tech, Ghee Kung Tong, and for medical marijuana legislation from undercover FBI agents in return for promises of official action; and Title 18 US Code Sections 371, 922(a)(1) and 922(1) for conspiracy to deal firearms without a license and to illegally import firearms from the Philippines by setting up an international weapons trafficking deal with undercover FBI agents. Yee was named with 28 other defendants in the FBI criminal complaint.

Yee was accused of dealing firearms without a license and illegally importing firearms. He was also accused of accepting "tens of thousands of dollars in campaign contributions and cash payments to provide introductions, help a client get a contract, and influence legislation." Yee and his campaign staff allegedly accepted at least $42,800 from undercover FBI agents in exchange for carrying out specific requests. Yee discussed the opportunity for an agent to get weapons worth up to $2.5 million from a Muslim separatist group in the Philippines to bring them to the US. He told the agent, "There's a part of me that wants to be like you. You know how I'm going to be like you? Just be a free agent there." Yee was arrested on March 26, 2014, and charged with six counts of depriving the public of honest services and one count of conspiracy to traffic guns without a license. He was released on $500,000 bail.

The FBI raided Yee's office at the California State Capitol and the San Francisco Chinatown office of the Ghee Kung Tong fraternal organization. This was linked to the arrest, on March 26, 2014, of Raymond "Shrimp Boy" Chow.

Federal prosecutors on July 25, 2014, added charges of racketeering for trying to get campaign contributions from the owner of an unnamed National Football League team in exchange for supporting legislation favored by league owners and opposed by some players.

On July 1, 2015, Yee pled guilty to charges of racketeering. He was sentenced to 5 years in prison on February 24, 2016, and was released in June 2020.

=== Mayoral and secretary of State campaigns ===
On November 10, 2010, Yee filed his candidacy for the 2011 San Francisco mayoral election. Yee placed fifth in the nonpartisan primary election.

In November 2012, Yee declared that he would run for secretary of state of California in 2014. On March 27, 2014, after being arrested on corruption charges, Yee's attorney stated that Yee would withdraw his candidacy for Secretary of State of California. Despite the charges pending against Yee, and his withdrawal from the race, Yee received 9.8% of the vote in the non-partisan primary for Secretary of State.

Yee's 2010 mayoral race ended in debt, and financing his first statewide race for California Secretary of State in 2014 was problematic. Yet Yee opposed CA Proposition 15 on the June 8, 2010 statewide ballot in California which, had it been enacted, would have raised fees on registered lobbyists in California to fund with matching grants political campaigns for qualified candidates running for the Office of the California Secretary of State as a pilot project in 2014 and 2018.

== Personal life ==
Leland Yee married his wife Maxine in 1972 and together they raised four children who attended San Francisco public schools. He made his home in San Francisco's Sunset District, but turned himself in to the U.S. Marshal's Service on March 25, 2016, to serve a five-year federal prison sentence.

In February 2013, Yee claimed that he had received a death threat, which was very explicit, and not like previous claimed death threats. The writer stated that he was a trained Marine sniper, and objected to Yee's actions on gun control. On Tuesday, February 12, 2013, Everett Basham, 45, a Silicon Valley engineer, was arrested and charged. Basham later pleaded no contest to the charges, and was sentenced to 5 years in prison.

== Awards ==
Yee was named the California Legislator of the Year by San Francisco Women's Political Committee, the American Federation of State, County and Municipal Employees (AFSCME Local 3299), California Society of Certified Public Accountants, Associated Students of the University of California (Davis) and the California Faculty Association among others.

Yee has also been awarded the following awards:

- Gun Violence Prevention Honor Roll by the Brady Campaign.
- Freedom of Information Award by the California Newspaper Publishers Association
- Modern Day Abolitionist Award by the San Francisco Collaborative Against Human Trafficking
- Building a State of Equality by Equality California
- Distinguished Service to Journalism Education Award by the Journalism Association of Community Colleges
- Service Award by Community Overcoming Relationship Abuse of San Mateo County
- Scholastic Journalism Award by the Journalism Education Association
- Beacon Award by the First Amendment Coalition
- Leadership Award from the California Animal Association
- Special Friend of Children Award by the National Association of School Psychologists
- Public Official Award by the Society of Professional Journalists

== See also ==
- History of the Chinese Americans in San Francisco

Political offices
Preceded by	Member of the San Francisco Board of Supervisors; District 4; 1997–2002	Succeeded by Fiona Ma
Preceded by	Speaker pro tempore of the California Assembly; 2003-2006	Succeeded by Sally J. Lieber
California Senate
Preceded by Jackie Speier	State Senator, 8th District; 2006-2014	Succeeded by Vacant
