= Michael Nevin =

Michael Nevin may refer to:

- Michael Nevin (boxer) (born 1998), Irish boxer
- Mike Nevin (1943–2012), American politician
