= Debbie Johnson =

Debbie Johnson may refer to:

- Debbie Johnson (politician)
- Debbie Johnson (singer)

== See also ==
- Deborah Johnson (disambiguation)
