= Love Honor Cherish =

American gay rights organization

- U.S. State of California
- Location: Los Angeles, California
- Region served: California
- Website: lovehonorcherish.org

Love Honor Cherish or LHC is a Los-Angeles based, non-profit, civil rights organization that advocates for the rights of gay and lesbian couples to marry in California and the repeal of Proposition 8 at the November 2, 2010 general election.

== Formation ==
Love Honor Cherish was founded in May 2008 by John Henning, Andrew Klayman and Tom Watson for the sole purpose of supporting the right to marry in California and to prepare for a potential ballot measure to ban same-sex marriage in California. Its first meeting was held in Los Angeles just days after the California Supreme Court's ruling of In re Marriage Cases that same-sex couples have a constitutional right to marry.

== Significant Activities Before November 4, 2008 ==
Following its formation, Love Honor Cherish mounted its own outreach and media efforts to campaign against the not-yet qualified ballot initiative that would later be called Proposition 8, with a strong focus on speaking the truth about marriage and developing a new generation of leadership on this issue.

In addition to doing outreach and a media campaign, Love Honor Cherish raised more than $500,000 for the No on 8 campaign through a series of house parties and fundraisers. Its largest fundraiser was an event at the Mondrian Hotel entitled "Heroes & History Makers Gala" that raised approximately $250,000 for the campaign. Attendees included Mayor Antonio Villaraigosa, Eric McCormack, Dana Delany, Kathryn Joosten, Loni Anderson, Eduardo Xol, Heather Tom, Marissa Jaret Winokur and Thomas Roberts.

== Significant Activities After November 4, 2008 ==
At the same time, Love Honor Cherish spearheaded a meeting of Los Angeles-based organizations favoring marriage equality called "Marriage of the Minds". This meeting led to the creation of the OutWest Coalition.

Love Honor Cherish joined with Equality California, Courage Campaign, Marriage Equality USA and other civil rights organizations to do polling and community outreach on opinions about same-sex marriage in California following the passage of Proposition 8. The coalition was informally known as the Poll for Equality. The ostensible purpose of the coalition was to do research to determine whether a repeal effort should be mounted in 2010 or 2012.

In summer 2009, Love Honor Cherish issued a blueprint for a 2010 campaign.

Equality California and Courage Campaign initially supported returning to the ballot in 2010 and the majority of their members voted to do so, but shifted their focus to 2012.

Love Honor Cherish continued to support repeal in 2010. On Sunday, August 9, Love Honor Cherish helped organize a meeting of a diverse array of groups and individuals from across California at the historic Jewel's Catch One in South Los Angeles to plan for the ballot initiative campaign to repeal Prop 8. A follow up meeting was held on August 29, 2009, at San Francisco State University, which elected an interim leadership group. Political Consultant Ace Smith gave the keynote speech.

Love Honor Cherish continues to pursue repeal in 2010, and is part of a statewide coalition called Restore Equality 2010.

== Proposition to Repeal Prop 8 ==
On September 24, 2009, Love Honor Cherish co-founders John Henning, Andrew Klayman and Tom Watson, along with Rev. Geoff Farrow, Jo Hoenninger, Ange-Marie Hancock, Jordan Krueger, Peter Nguyen and Edwin Rivera, filed a proposition to repeal Proposition 8 with the California Secretary of State. Its language is as follows:

- Section 1:

To protect religious freedom, no court shall interpret this measure to require any priest, minister, pastor, rabbi, or other person authorized to perform marriages by any religious denomination, church or other non-profit religious institution to perform any marriage in violation of his or her religious beliefs. The refusal to perform a marriage under this provision shall not be the basis for lawsuit or liability, and shall not affect the tax-exempt status of any religious denomination, church or other religious institution.

- Section 2:

To provide for fairness in the government's issuance of marriage licenses, Section 7.5 of Article I of the California Constitution is hereby amended to read as follows: Sec. 7.5. ~~Only marriage between a man and a woman is valid or recognized in California.~~ Marriage is between only two persons and shall not be restricted on the basis of race, color, national origin, sex, gender, sexual orientation, or religion.

The proposition was approved for circulation in mid-November. Love Honor Cherish and its coalition partners have until April 12, 2010 to collect signatures to qualify it for the November 2010 ballot.

== Approach to Gathering Signatures ==
In November 2010, Love Honor Cherish launched "Sign for Equality", a social networking internet site to assist with signature gathering. No other initiative has ever sought to be qualified based in part on signatures gathered through internet-based social networking.

As of December 2010, Love Honor Cherish was actively gathering signatures to try to qualify the proposition.
