= Deborah Johnson =

Deborah Johnson may refer to:

- Deborah G. Johnson (born 1945), American philosopher
- Deborah Snyder (born 1969), American producer
- Akua Njeri (born 1949), American writer and activist
- Deborah Johnson, a woman involved in Rolon v. Kulwitzky
