= California Senate Bill 107 =

2022 California law

California Senate
- Long title: An act to add Section 56.109 to the Civil Code, to amend Sections 2029.300 and 2029.350 of the Code of Civil Procedure, to amend Sections 3421, 3424, 3427, and 3428 of, and to add Section 3453.5 to, the Family Code, and to amend Section 1326 of, and to add Section 819 to, the Penal Code, relating to health care.
- Territorial extent: California
- Enacted by: California Senate
- Enacted by: California State Assembly
- Signed by: Gavin Newsom
- Signed: September 29, 2022
- Effective: January 1, 2023

Legislative history

Initiating chamber: California Senate
- Introduced by: Scott Wiener
- Introduced: January 5, 2021
- First reading: January 11, 2021
- Second reading: March 23, 2021 and January 4, 2022
- Third reading: January 6, 2022
- Voting summary: 32 voted for

Revising chamber: California State Assembly
- Received from the California Senate: January 6, 2022
- First reading: January 6, 2022
- Second reading: June 29, 2022 and August 4, 2022
- Third reading: August 29, 2022
- Voting summary: 60 voted for; 19 voted against

Summary
- Protects access to gender-affirming medical care for minors in California and prohibits the enforcement of out-of-state laws or court orders regarding such care.
- Status: In force

California Senate Bill 107 (SB-107) is a 2022 law in the state of California that protects access to gender-affirming medical care for minors and prevents the enforcement of out-of-state laws regarding such care. It was signed by Governor Gavin Newsom on September 29, 2022 and took effect on January 1, 2023.

The bill was introduced by state senator Scott Wiener, who is openly gay. The passage of Senate Bill 107 turned California into the first trans sanctuary state in the United States due its protections from out-of-state laws restricting or punishing the provision of gender-affirming care for minors.

== Provisions ==
Senate Bill 107 prohibits California officials and courts from releasing any information relating to the provision of minors' gender-affirming care, even under subpoena; as well as the enforcement of out-of-state court orders or laws preventing such care, such as provisions outlawing traveling across state lines to receive medical care. Children cannot be removed from the custody of their parents if their child receives gender-affirming care.

== Reactions ==
=== Support ===
Planned Parenthood of California supported SB-107, along with other similar laws in consideration at the time. Governor Newsom stated after his signing of SB-107 that parents know best about their children and their medical decisions.

=== Opposition ===
SB-107 was opposed by the Southern Baptist Convention, referring to it as "immoral." The Alliance Defending Freedom also opposes SB-107, stating it violates parental rights and the U.S. Constitution. Troy Nehls, a Republican congressman from Texas, and Ron DeSantis, the governor of Florida, claimed that SB-107 allows minors to receive sex reassignment surgery in California without parental consent, though their claims would later be debunked.

== See also ==
- LGBTQ rights in California
