= Marriage Equality California =

Former LGBT rights organization

- Founded: 1999
- Founder: L.J. Carusone, Mark Levine
- Dissolved: Merged with Equality California in 2004
- Type: 501(c)(3)
- Purpose: Gay rights
- Location: Venice, California, US
- Region served: California, US
- Method: Campaigning, Advocacy, Public Speaking

Marriage Equality California (Marriage Equality CA, or MECA) is the now defunct California chapter of Marriage Equality USA. Founded in 1999, MECA was the grassroots organization fighting to secure the legal recognition of same-sex marriage through education and outreach in California. Its mission statement is to secure the freedom and the right of same-sex couples to enter into legally recognized civil marriage, having all the federal and state benefits and responsibilities which that entails. Marriage Equality California merged with Equality California in 2004. Most of the work performed by Marriage Equality California is now performed as a local project of its original parent organization Marriage Equality USA.

== History ==
Under the leadership of L.J. Carusone and Mark Levine, the Marriage Equality California Chapter was created. On February 14, 2000, at a protest in Beverly Hills, Marriage Equality California became one of the first marriage-equality organizations in the country to organize a "mass-marriage protest" at a city clerk's offices on Valentine's Day, a tradition that has continued every February and spread throughout the 58 counties of California and to New York City. Levine writes he:

promised the police and court officials that we would not be violent in any way. And court officials, in turn, graciously agreed to waive the marriage license fee, since we all knew they would reject our attempts to get married. I remember it was a beautiful day, and a joyful one: We all smiled ear-to-ear knowing we were attempting something that was then impossible but which every one of us thought would eventually become possible.

Marriage Equality California was entirely volunteer driven with no paid staff, and educated Californians through rallies & demonstrations, educational programs, outreach, and media representation.

From 1999 to 2002, Marriage Equality California was the primary advocate for marriage equality in California, and was an advocate for California Assembly bill 1338, California's first civil-unions bill and the second civil-unions bill in the nation after Vermont's. Introduced February 23, 2001, AB 1338 was the first law in the United States that would have given full state and federal marriage rights to gay and lesbian couples. (Vermont gave only state rights.) The original version of AB 1338 providing the option for same sex-couples in California to enter into a civil union after the original legislation, co-drafted by co-founder Mark Levine was withdrawn, according to him, for being too "pro-equality" for gay people.

== See also ==
- LGBT rights in the United States
