= Equality California =

Non-profit civil rights organization

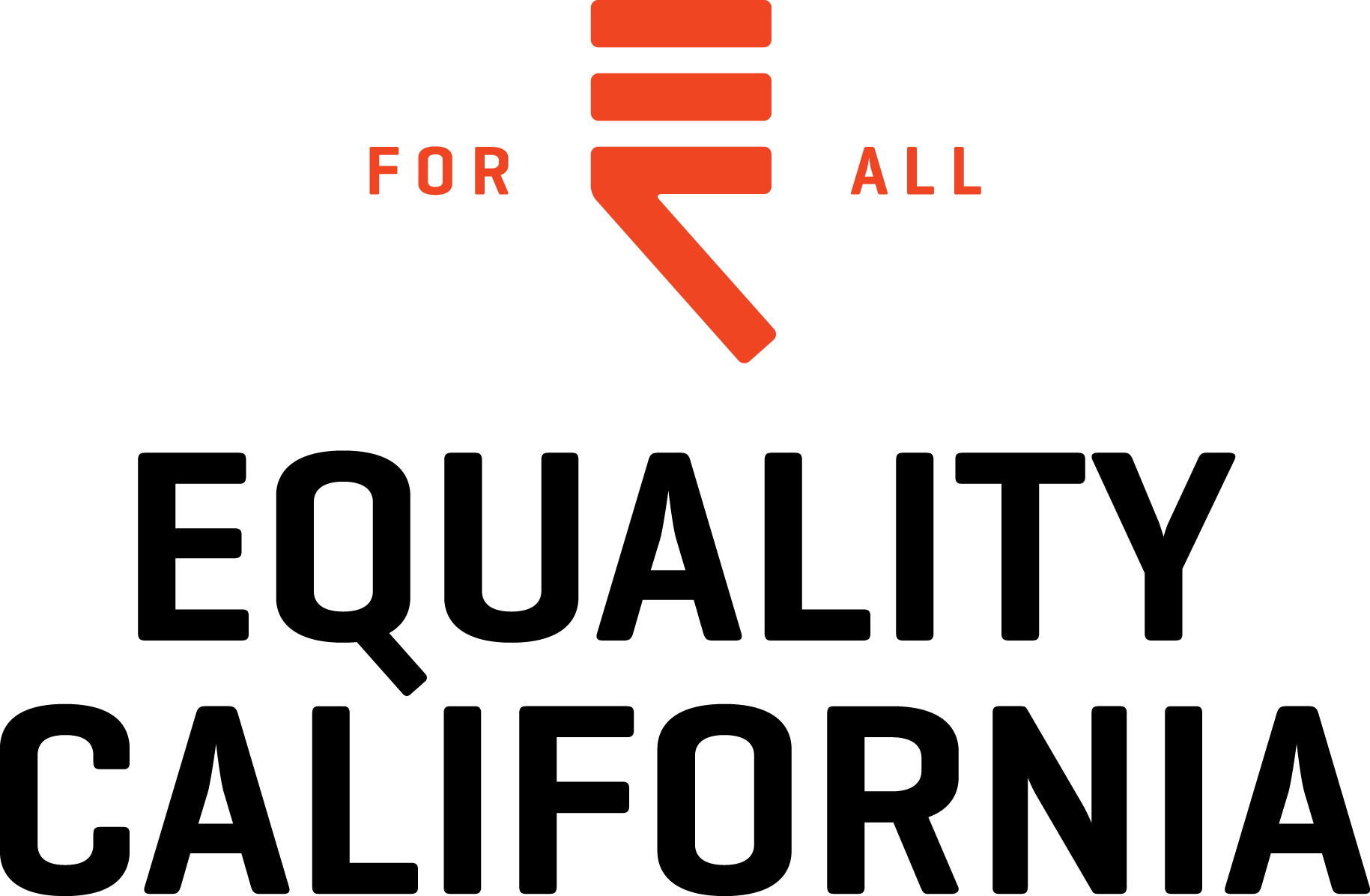

- U.S. state of California
- Founded: 1998
- Headquarters: Los Angeles, California
- Region served: California
- Key people: Tony Hoang, executive director
- Website: www.eqca.org
- Formerly called: California Alliance for Pride and Equality (CAPE) and Marriage Equality California

Equality California (EQCA) is a non-profit civil rights organization that advocates for the rights of LGBT people in California. It is the largest statewide LGBT organization in the United States and the largest member of the Equality Federation. The organization is based in Los Angeles.

== Structure ==
Equality California is an umbrella organization for the Equality California Institute, a 501(c)(3) organization that conducts public education programs for members of the LGBT community and the general public, as well as for healthcare workers, educators and public policymakers; and Equality California, a 501(c)(4) that maintains three political action committees (PACs), and, as of September 2016 has sponsored passage of more than 118 laws in the California Legislature expanding LGBT civil rights in the state.

== Leadership ==
Equality California's leadership includes Executive Director Tony Hoang, and is supported by the separate boards of Equality California and Equality California Institute, as well as the Equality Council.

== History ==
=== Recent history ===
When Rick Zbur (Executive Director 2014-2021) assumed the position of the organization's executive director in 2014, a rapid string of LGBT civil rights victories made it clear that a victory in the two-decade struggle to win same-sex marriage appeared imminent and that the priorities of LGBT organizations would have to evolve if they were to survive. In the summer of 2014, months before the historic 2015 U.S. Supreme Court decision in Obergefell v. Hodges, Zbur met with boardmembers to assess the organization, its priorities and its place in the LGBT civil rights landscape. The result was a broadly refocused mission designed to address the many, well-documented disparities in health and well-being that LGBT people suffer in comparison to the general population, especially the community's most marginalized members: people of color, the transgender community and LGBT undocumented immigrants.

The organization divided its new mission and its programs into three areas: ending LGBT disparities in health and well-being, advancing the civil rights and acceptance of LGBT people and achieving a fair and just society for LGBT people and all the communities of which they are a part. The organization has condemned votes by members of California's congressional delegation to tighten restrictions on Syrian refugees attempting to enter the United States; and advocated for healthcare coverage for California's undocumented immigrants, as well as educating healthcare professionals in the state's Central Valley and Inland Empire regions about the special healthcare needs of LGBT and undocumented populations.

=== Early history ===
The California Alliance for Pride and Equality (CAPE) was founded in 1999, and the CAPE Foundation was launched in 2000 to expand education and outreach efforts. In 2003, the organizations became Equality California, the Equality California Institute and Equality California Political Action Committee. In 2004, Equality California merged with Marriage Equality California. From Marriage Equality USA, EQCA subsumed both the local chapters of MECA throughout California, as well as hiring their volunteer leadership to become the field staff. The new consolidated programs became a joint project of EQCA and MECA. Eventually the program became the Equality California field team.

In 2006, Equality California Institute launched "Let California Ring," an educational campaign aimed at swaying public opinion on same-sex marriage. Let California Ring produced the well-received "Garden Wedding" ad, which aired only in the Santa Barbara media market as part of a study of the effect of various messages on public opinion. It was credited with an 11-point jump in support for same-sex marriage in the study area, and, in fact, Santa Barbara was the only county in Southern California to vote against Proposition 8 in 2008. Equality California was an organizational plaintiff in In re Marriage Cases, a consolidation of lawsuits filed by the National Center for Lesbian Rights (NCLR), American Civil Liberties Union (ACLU), Lambda Legal, several law firms and a number of individuals challenging California's marriage laws that excluded same-sex couples. The California Supreme Court on May 15, 2008, ruled that California same-sex couples had a right to marry under the California Constitution. Same-sex couples were able to marry as of June 17, 2008. Voters amended the state constitution to prohibit same-sex couples from marrying in November of that year with the passage of Proposition 8.

== Significant activities and programs: Equality California ==
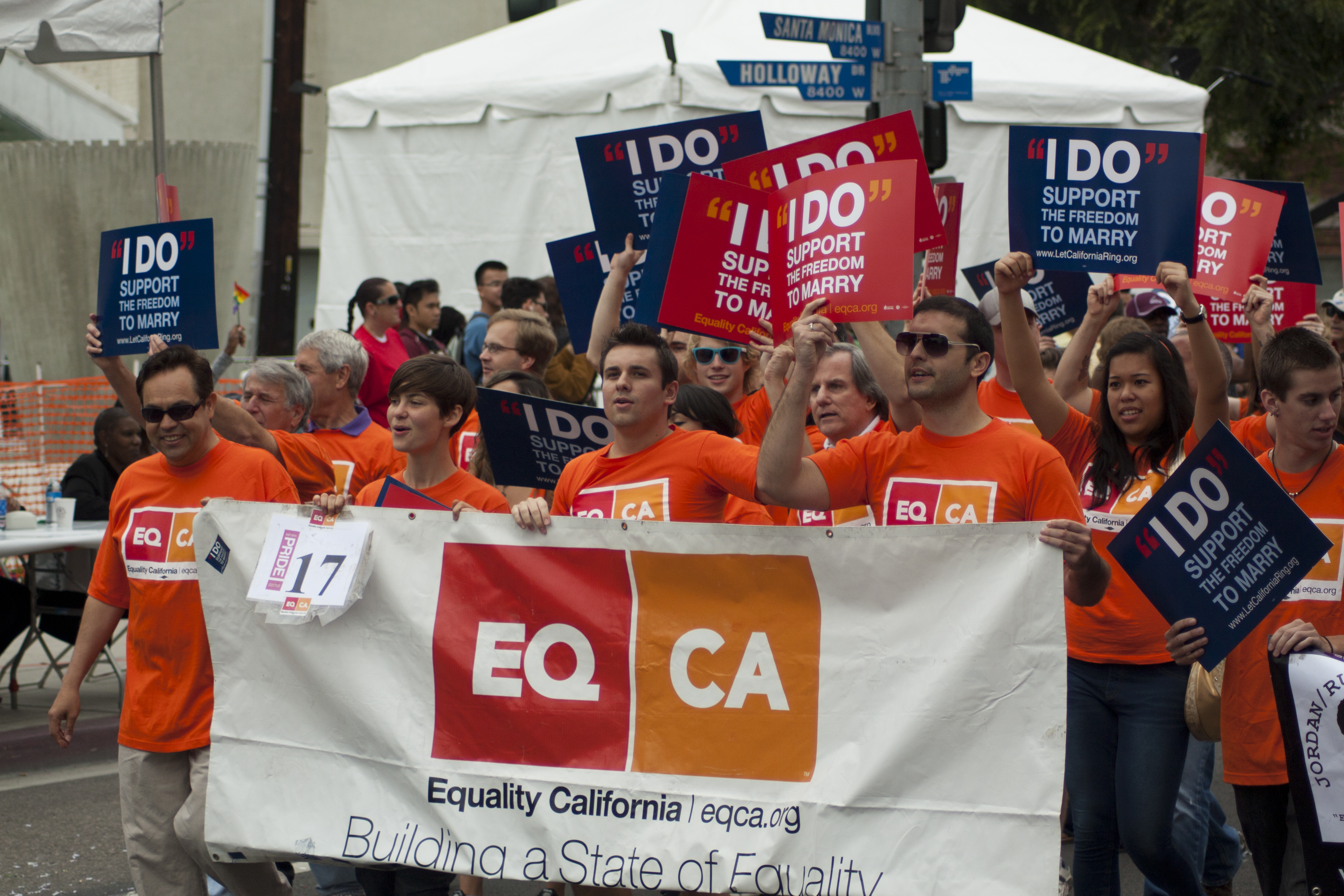
EQCA at the Los Angeles LGBT pride parade in 2011

=== Legislation ===
==== 2005 ====
- AB 849, the Religious Freedom and Civil Marriage Protection Act – AB 849, authored by then-California Assemblymember Mark Leno (D-San Francisco) and sponsored by Equality California, was the first time in U.S. history that a legislative body had approved a bill giving same-sex couples the right to marry. AB 849 was vetoed by Gov. Arnold Schwarzenegger.

==== 2011 ====
- SB 48, the FAIR Education Act – SB 48, authored by Sen. Leno and sponsored by Equality California and GSA Network, expands groups included in California public school history and social sciences curricula to include the history of and contributions by LGBT people and people with disabilities. Guided by the law, the California Department of Education approved a new History-Social Science Framework in 2016.

==== 2012 ====
- SB 1172, Protecting LGBT Youth From Psychological Abuse – SB 1172, authored by State Sen. Ted Lieu (D-Torrance) and sponsored by Equality California, NCLR, Lambda Legal and other groups, was the first law in the nation to ban the practice of so-called conversion therapy on minors. Backers of the practice quickly launched Pickup v. Brown and Welch v. Brown, lawsuits challenging the constitutionality of the new law, which was upheld by the U.S 9th Circuit Court of Appeals in 2013.

==== 2013 ====
- AB 1266, the School Success and Opportunity Act – AB 1266, authored by California Asm. Tom Ammiano (D-San Francisco), protects the right of California K-12 public school students to use facilities and participate in programs consistent with their gender identity. Opponents mounted an effort to place an initiative on the ballot overturning the law but failed to collect the required signatures.

==== 2014 ====
- AB 1577, Respect After Death Act – AB 1577, authored by Asm. Toni Atkins (D-San Diego) and sponsored by Equality California and the Transgender Law Center, ensures that death certificates for transgender Californians accurately reflect their gender identity.
- AB 2501, End Panic Defense – AB 2501, authored by Asm. Susan Bonilla (D-Concord) and sponsored by Equality California, eliminates the use so-called "gay panic" and "trans panic" defenses in criminal cases, in which defendants claim a type of temporary insanity due to a purported same-sex or transgender sexual advance.
- AB 1951, Modernize Birth Certificates – AB 1951, authored by Asm. Jimmy Gomez (D-Los Angeles) and sponsored by Equality California, accommodates same-sex parents by allowing them to designate themselves as "father", "mother" or "parent" on birth certificates. Previous birth certificate applications included lines reading only "father/parent" and "mother/parent".

==== 2015 ====
- SB 703, Insurance Benefits for Transgender Employees – SB 703, authored by Sen. Mark Leno and sponsored by Equality California, NCLR and the Transgender Law Center, prohibits state agencies from doing business with companies not offering the same healthcare benefits to transgender employees that they offer all other workers.
- SB 731: Supporting Transgender Foster Youth – SB 731, authored by Senator Mark Leno and sponsored by Equality California, NCLR and the Transgender Law Center, requires that a young person's gender identity be a consideration before that youth is placed in a foster care setting.
- AB 329, California Healthy Youth Act – AB 329 was authored by Asm. Shirley Weber (D-San Diego) and sponsored by Equality California, the ACLU of California, California Latinas for Reproductive Justice, Forward Together and Planned Parenthood Affiliates of California. It requires the inclusion of LGBT people and families in California public school sex education curricula.
- AB 959, LGBT Data Collection – AB 959, authored by Asm. David Chiu (D-San Francisco) and sponsored by Equality California, requires government agencies to include LGBT people when they collect additional data on other groups, providing more accurate information for the allocation of state social services.

==== 2016 ====
- SB 1146, Uncovering Discrimination in Higher Education – SB 1146, authored by Sen. Ricardo Lara (D-Bell Gardens) and sponsored by Equality California, requires private colleges and universities affiliated with religious organizations to publicly disclose if they have obtained an exemption to state or federal nondiscrimination laws prohibiting discrimination against LGBT people.
- SB 1408, HIV-Positive Organ and Tissue Donation – SB 1408, authored by Sen. Ben Allen (D-Santa Monica) and sponsored by Equality California, AIDS Project Los Angeles, the Los Angeles LGBT Center and Positive Women's Network-USA, permits the donation of organs and tissue between HIV-positive donors and HIV-positive recipients.
- AB 1887, State Government: Discrimination, Travel – AB 1887, authored by Asm. Evan Low (D-Silicon Valley) and sponsored by Equality California, prohibits state-funded travel by state employees to jurisdictions with new, anti-LGBT laws in place. AB 1887 passed in response to laws such as North Carolina's HB2 or Mississippi's HB 1523.
- AB 2246, Pupil Suicide Prevention Policies – AB 2246, Authored by Asm. Patrick O'Donnell (D-Long Beach) and sponsored by Equality California and the Trevor Project, requires California public school districts serving grades 7–12 to adopt a suicide-prevention policy, with a special focus on groups at especially high risk for suicide, such as LGBT teens. The law also requires the California Department of Education to develop and maintain a model suicide prevention policy.

=== Equality California PACs ===
==== Candidates PAC ====
At the state level, the organization endorses LGBT and allied candidates with a 100-percent record of supporting LGBT issues, and, in the case of incumbent legislative candidates, a history of scoring 100 percent on Equality California's "Equality Scorecard". In September 2016, that requirement of 100-percent support led Equality California to take the unusual step of revoking its endorsement of six state legislators, following their abstentions or opposition in a key vote on SB 1146. The organization also endorses openly LGBT candidates at the local level.

==== Federal PAC ====
Equality California's Federal PAC works to elect LGBT and pro-LGBT candidates to congressional office and the White House through endorsements and direct advocacy.

In March 2015 EQCA announced its endorsement of Hillary Clinton for president, making it the first LGBT-rights group to endorse Clinton's then-anticipated candidacy.

==== Issues PAC ====
Equality California takes positions on selected ballot initiatives. The organization issues "support" or "oppose" recommendations on initiatives to its members in advance of elections, and has been a lead member of coalitions to defeat several ballot measures, including Proposition 8 and against a failed drive to place a measure on the ballot to overturn AB 1266.

=== Other advocacy ===
- Gun Safety – Following the June 12, 2016, shooting rampage at an LGBT nightclub in Orlando, Equality California became one of the first LGBT civil rights organizations to make combating gun violence a key part of its mission. The organization cited a long history of hate crimes against LGBT people—especially transgender women—and a spike in LGBT homicides. At a news conference with state and local Los Angeles officials less than a week after the shootings, Equality California announced its "#SafeAndEqual" initiative for stricter gun safety measures, and its support for a number of firearms-related bills then making their way through the California Legislature . Zbur said the group would "aggressively lobby" for those and other state and federal measures. In August 2016 Equality California announced its endorsement of California Proposition 63, a measure on the November ballot seeking to ban possession of high-capacity ammunition magazines and require background checks for the purchase of ammunition.
- Budget Advocacy – Equality California works with state legislators and other officials to advocate for funding for state programs for LGBT homeless youth as part of state budget negotiations.
- Federal Advocacy – Equality California works with members of California's congressional delegation and other federal officials to pressure the Food and Drug Administration to end its rules barring blood donation by gay and bisexual men, to advocate for passage of the federal Equality Act, and more. In early 2017, the organization announced that it had hired its first Washington, D.C.–based national policy director as a response to the "unprecedented" threat to LGBT rights presented by the incoming administration of Donald Trump.

=== Significant activities and programs: Equality California Institute ===
As part of the mission adopted in 2014, Equality California Institute initiated a number of new programs to educate LGBT people and the public at large about issues impacting the LGBT community and the communities of which LGBT people are also a part. Those program areas include:

- Immigration: Equality California Institute leads "Equality4All", focused on building LGBT community support for immigration issues. As part of its "Health Happens with Equality" initiative, the organization also conducts cultural competency trainings for healthcare workers about the special healthcare needs of LGBT and undocumented people.
- Transgender rights: In April 2016, together with the Transgender Law Center, Equality California Institute co-founded Transform California. Transform California is a project of a statewide coalition of organizations focused on building public acceptance and understanding by educating Californians about transgender people and the challenges they face.
- HIV: Equality California Institute is part of a coalition of HIV advocacy and civil rights organizations seeking to educate lawmakers and modernize California's laws that criminalize HIV transmission. The organization's "#TakeIt – I'm PrEP'd" campaign aims to educate the LGBT community about the availability and efficacy of pre-exposure prophylaxis therapy (PrEP), with a special focus on gay and bisexual men and transgender women of color.
- Youth and Schools: In addition to Equality California's advocacy for legislation in the state capitol protecting LGBT students, Equality California Institute is developing a "Safe and Supportive Schools Index" that will provide a way to measure how effectively California schools are providing supportive environments for LGBT students and protecting them from bullying and harassment. The organization is also developing a series of cultural competency trainings for educators to better prepare them to identify and help at-risk LGBT students.
- Leadership Development: Equality California Institute holds an annual Leadership Academy for rising LGBT leaders, as well as an annual summer fellowship in Sacramento for students together with support from the Comcast Foundation.
- Outreach to Faith Leaders: In 2015, Equality California Institute merged with California Faith for Equality, a network of some 300 clergy members from various Christian, Jewish, Muslim and other congregations across California. Members of the network aim to provide an accepting and tolerant voice of religion in response to the often anti-LGBT rhetoric often repeated by some faith leaders, as well as to encourage their own congregations to support LGBT equality.

== See also ==
- LGBT rights in California
- LGBT history in California
- Same-sex marriage in California
- List of LGBT rights organizations
