= Mike Nevin =

Michael D. Nevin (born 1943 – December 1, 2012) was a Democratic politician from the U.S. state of California.

== Background ==
He was the son of Ed Nevin Jr., a San Francisco born Irish Catholic and his wife, Mazie McDermott. He was part of a family that had three boys and four girls. His father was a San Francisco police officer and his grandfather, Edward Nevin, died as a result of a secret 1950 US Army bioweapons test in San Francisco.

Nevin was educated at St. Ignatius College Preparatory, graduating in 1961, and at the City College of San Francisco and the University of San Francisco.

== Law enforcement ==
He joined the San Francisco Police Department in 1965, serving for 27 years and reaching the rank of Inspector

== Politics ==
Nevin was named Daly City planning commissioner in 1979. He was elected to the Daly City Council in 1982, and chosen Mayor of Daily City in 1984 and again in 1989.

From 1989 to 1992, he served on the Criminal Justice Council of San Mateo County and the Narcotics Task Force, a subcommittee of the Criminal Justice Council.

From 1992, when he retired from the SFPD, until 2004 (when he was term-limited out) he served on the San Mateo County Board of Supervisors, advocating the medicinal use of marijuana during his tenure. Nevin was the first proposer of a plan to legalize the distribution of medical marijuana in San Mateo County through government-run facilities, which became law in 1997.

He unsuccessfully ran to represent District 8, which encompasses western San Francisco and nearly all of San Mateo County, for the California State Senate, seeking the Democratic nomination in the Primary against Leland Yee. In his political career, Nevin focused on transportation issues, including the expansion of BART and Caltrain, as well as gun control, education, and health care.

After being termed out from the San Mateo County Board of Supervisor, Nevin briefly served under a controversial appointment to the SamTrans board of directors seat reserved for "public" members. Nevin was appointed as Executive Director of the Service League of San Mateo County on August 22, 2006.

== Illness and death ==
Nevin died on December 1, 2012, of esophageal cancer.
