= SaveCalifornia.com =

United States nonprofit organization

- Founded: September 11, 1999
- Founder: Randy Thomasson
- Type: Public charity 501(c)(3)
- Tax ID no.: 68-0530784 (EIN)
- Location: Sacramento, California
- Owner: Campaign for Children and Families
- Key people: Randy Thomasson, President; Larry Bowler, Chairman
- Revenue: $195,203 (2010)
- Website: savecalifornia.com

SaveCalifornia.com is an American conservative activist group that was founded in 1999 by Randy Thomasson as part of a Campaign for Children and Families (CCF). The organization is active in influencing public policy on various social issues and has opposed California's FAIR Education Act.

== History and issues ==
Save California.com is a project of Campaign for Children and Families, a California-based advocacy non-profit organization formed in 1999 by Randy Thomasson. The organization has a stated goal of "defending and representing the values of parents, grandparents and concerned citizens who want what's best for this generation and future generations." Thomasson has been involved in influencing social and fiscal policies in government since 1994, through various media outlets. He also founded Campaign for California Families, a non-profit organization which sought to defend Proposition 22 and Proposition 8 against constitutional challenges in the courts.

=== Lobbying activities ===
The organization supported California's Proposition 8 and opposed a state bill which would allow two people, including same-sex couples, who jointly owned a home to avoid having their property tax reassessed and raised when one of them dies. Following Chief U.S. District Judge Vaughn Walker's ruling overturning California's same-sex marriage ban in 2010, sending the landmark case to the US Supreme Court, SaveCalifornia.com reacted with a statement:

Natural marriage, voter rights, the Constitution, and our republic called the United States of America have all been dealt a terrible blow. Judge Walker has ignored the written words of the Constitution, which he swore to support and defend and be impartially faithful to, and has instead imposed his own homosexual agenda upon the voters, the parents, and the children of California. This is a blatantly unconstitutional ruling because marriage isn't in the U.S. Constitution. The Constitution guarantees that state policies be by the people, not by the judges, and also supports states' rights, thus making marriage a state jurisdiction.

SaveCalifornia.com also lobbied against California's FAIR Education Act, using social media to help carry its message to the public. In 2011, Thomasson described the bill as "sexual brainwashing" and called for "parents to remove their children from the government school system, and get them into the safe havens of church schooling and home schooling." After the California Assembly passed the bill by a 49-to-25 vote, SaveCalifornia.com urged governor Jerry Brown to veto the bill as "unneeded, unwanted and un-affordable".

In 2009, after President Obama posthumously awarded the Medal of Freedom to gay rights activist Harvey Milk, SaveCalifornia.com held a press conference in which Thomasson argued that Milk was unfit for the nation's highest civilian honor. Thomasson told MSNBC and CBS that the president had made "a mistake" by honoring Milk. The organization also led opposition against Harvey Milk Day, referring to Milk as a "sexual predator", citing the Randy Shilts book, The Mayor of Castro Street: The Life and Times of Harvey Milk.

=== Hate group listing ===
In March 2012, the Southern Poverty Law Center (SPLC) added SaveCalifornia.com to its list of anti-gay hate groups. According to SPLC director Heidi Beirich, "In order to make the list as an anti-gay group, the group has to lie, defame or spread false propaganda about the LGBT community ... In this case, language that depicts LGBT people as predatory, attempting to convert children and as having unhealthy lifestyles—all of those things—are what got him on the list." Beirich also stated that such language about an entire group "increases the likelihood of hate crimes being directed at that group."

== See also ==
- List of organizations designated by the Southern Poverty Law Center as anti-gay hate groups
