= California Senate Bill 242 (2009) =

SB 242 is a bill which was proposed in the California Senate February 24, 2009, by Senator Leland Yee (D), as a modification of the Unruh Civil Rights Act in California.

It was approved (vote 3–2) by Committee in March, 2009.

It was approved (vote 21–15) by the Senate on April 16, 2009.

It was amended July 14, 2009. The changes improve the clarity of the wording of the bill, but do not change the meaning of the bill.

It was approved (vote of 48–27) by the Assembly on August 20, 2009.

(As of 26 August 2009) SB 242 must receive a procedural concurrence vote in the Senate before heading to the Governor's desk.

This bill was vetoed by the Governor on October 11, 2009.

== Excerpts from the bill's text ==
Legislative Counsel's Digest (from the amended version)

The Unruh Civil Rights Act generally prohibits business establishments from discriminating on the basis of sex, race, color, religion, ancestry, national origin, disability, or medical condition.

This bill would make it a violation of the Unruh Civil Rights Act to adopt or enforce a policy that requires, limits, or prohibits the use of any language in or with a business establishment, unless the policy is justified by a business necessity, as defined, and notification has been provided of the circumstances and the time when the language restriction or requirement is to be observed and of the consequences for its violation.

The bill would define business necessity to require, among other things, that the language restriction or requirement is necessary for the safe and efficient operation of the business and that an equally effective, but less discriminatory, alternative practice does not exist.

== Controversy ==
It is of concern to many companies that this legislation will either open them to lawsuits, or increase their cost of doing business in California, as they could be subject to minimum damages of $4,000, if a business limits the use of a customer's language, even if unintentionally.

== See also ==
- Politics of California
- Unruh Civil Rights Act
