= Rolon v. Kulwitzky =

California court case about LGBT discrimination by businesses

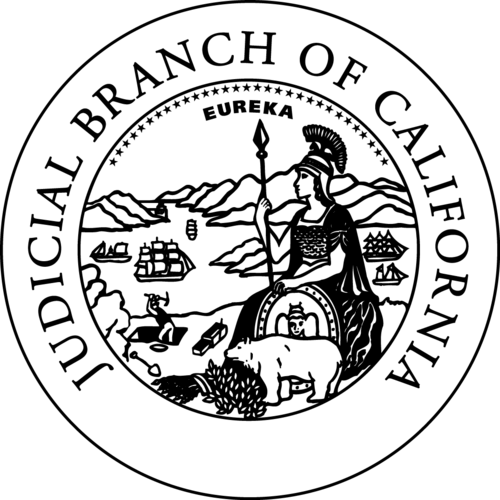
- Court: California Court of Appeal
- Full case name: Zandra Rolón et al., Plaintiffs and Appellants, v. Walter Kulwitzky et al., Defendants and Respondents
- Decided: March 25, 1984

Court membership
- Judges sitting: Opinion by Kingsley, J., with Woods, P. J., and McClosky, J., concurring.

Keywords
- Sexual discrimination; Civil rights; Gender discrimination; LGBT rights

Rolon v. Kulwitzky (Court of Appeals of California, Second District, Division 4, B002051; March 20, 1984) was an unlawful discrimination case filed by Deborah Johnson and Zandra Rolón, a lesbian couple, against a Los Angeles restaurant, Papa Choux, after they were refused seating in a semi-private booth. The lower court denied the plaintiffs a preliminary injunction in their action for unlawful discrimination, but the Court of Appeals reversed the lower court, holding that the restaurant engaged in prohibited discrimination.

== Background ==
On January 3, 1983, Deborah Johnson and Zandra Rolón arrived at Papa Choux restaurant in Los Angeles, having made a prior reservation. The couple, both lesbian activists of color who had been involved in promoting LGBT rights in the area during the 1970s and 1980s, were kicking off their first full weekend together as a couple in honor of Martin Luther King's birthday, which had just been declared a national holiday. Upon their arrival at the restaurant, the waiter hesitated to seat them, but allowed them into the semi-private "Romantic Booth" in the restaurant's "intimate room" as they requested. However, the two women were not provided with menus, and after waiting for a while were confronted by the maitre d' and then the restaurant manager, who told them that they could not be served there, and that the booths were reserved for heterosexual couples only. The exchange escalated to a shouting match, as the activists refused to vacate the booth and the restaurant employees maintaining that serving them was against the law.

== Lawsuit ==
The women eventually left, while writing down the names of the personnel involved. They approached civil rights attorney Gloria Allred, who filed a suit for damages for violation of the Unruh Civil Rights Act, which protects against discrimination based on sex or sexual orientation by businesses, as well as a preliminary injunction prohibiting the restaurant from continuing with their discriminatory policy. Allred told the press, “We intend to end this dinner discrimination and give Papa Choux’s their just desserts.”

The restaurant never denied the practice, and in several newspaper interviews, the manager, Walter Kulwitzky, and owner, Seymour Jacoby, were quoted as preferring to go to jail rather than obeying a court order to serve same-sex couples, should such an order be issued. They went so far as to take out an advertisement in the Los Angeles Times in June 1983, stating that serving any but mixed couples in the booths would "make a mockery of true romance". The plaintiffs launched a boycott of the restaurant under the name "Stop Dining Discrimination", and protests were mounted in front of the restaurant, including a candlelight vigil in honor of Martin Luther King Jr. Day the following year.

California Superior Court Bruce Geernaert, who heard the case, visited the restaurant in the course of the trial, at the end of which he denied the plaintiffs their injunction, ruling that Section 51 of the Civil Code, also known as the Unruh Civil Rights Act, only bars discrimination based on sex, not sexual orientation, and accepting the defendants' claim that the policy was geared to protect other diners from being exposed to behavior they might deem offensive. However, the plaintiffs appealed, and the Court of Appeals of California, District 4, reversed the ruling. The appellate court held that the Unruh Civil Rights Act does prohibit discrimination based on sexual orientation, and that Chapter IV, article 12, of the Los Angeles Municipal Code specifically prohibits such discrimination in the provision of services by businesses. The court also rejected the defendants/respondents' central argument about protecting other diners, as the lesbian couple was offered service in the open seating area, where they could be seen by all restaurant patrons, and were only denied service in the private booth.

The restaurant petitioned the California Supreme Court, which declined to hear the case, leaving the appellate decision to stand.

== Impact ==
Johnson and Rolón returned to the lower court to get the requested injunction, which was issued, as well as their damages of $250 each (the amount of the requisite municipal fine). The defendants were also required to pay the plaintiff's attorney's fees for the legal action surrounding the case, which amounted to nearly $30,000.

Rather than comply with the law and serve same-sex couples in the romantic booths, the restaurant decided to eliminate the intimate seating area altogether. The owner published additional ads and contacted the press, announcing an event to close the controversial section of the restaurant, which he called a "Wake for Romance", to mark the “death” of “true romantic dining.” The event included funeral wreaths, an open bar, and a funeral director was contracted to conduct a ceremony; however, he never showed up on the day. Gloria Allred was also invited, and declined to attend.

The legal significance of the case was that it was the first instance in which a court held that California’s civil rights bill includes a prohibition of discrimination by businesses on the basis of sexual orientation. The case has been cited as a precedent in other cases on LGBT discrimination, including before the United States Supreme Court. The high-profile court challenge also made national news, bringing attention to the impact of prejudice on ordinary people.

Since then, the case has been included in school, university and law school curricula and books about civil rights and LGBT history.
