= FAIR Education Act =

2011 California law

California State Legislature
- Full name: Fair, Accurate, Inclusive, and Respectful Education Act
- Introduced: December 13, 2010
- Assembly voted: July 5, 2011
- Senate voted: April 14, 2011
- Signed into law: July 14, 2011
- Sponsor(s): Sen. Mark Leno, Assem. Tom Ammiano
- Governor: Jerry Brown
- Code: Education Code
- Section: 51204.5, 51500, 51501, 60040, and 60044
- Resolution: SB 48
- Website: http://info.sen.ca.gov/pub/11-12/bill/sen/sb_0001-0050/sb_48_bill_20110714_chaptered.html

Status: Current legislation

Fair, Accurate, Inclusive, and Respectful Education Act, also known as the FAIR Education Act (Senate Bill 48) and informally described by media outlets as the LGBT History Bill, is a California law which compels the inclusion of the political, economic, and social contributions of persons with disabilities and lesbian, gay, bisexual, and transgender people into educational textbooks and the social studies curricula in California public schools by amending the California Education Code. It also revises the previous designation of "black Americans, American Indians, Mexicans, Asians, [and] Pacific Island people" into a list considered Indigenous peoples of the Americas. It would also amend an existing law by adding sexual orientation and religion into a list of characteristics (which already includes race, ethnicity, nationality, gender, and disability) that schools are prohibited from sponsoring negative activities about or teaching students about in an adverse way.

In particular, according to chief author Sen. Mark Leno, it "ensures that the historical contributions of lesbian, gay, bisexual and transgender people are accurately and fairly portrayed in instructional materials by adding LGBT people to the existing list of under-represented cultural and ethnic groups already included in the state’s inclusionary education requirements." It is notable that the law does not include an opt-out option for parents who do not wish to have their children learn about LGBT topics in school.

The bill was introduced into the Senate on December 13, 2010, and was finally passed 23–14 on April 14, 2011. The bill was then passed by the Assembly on July 5 by a vote of 49–25. Governor Jerry Brown, who has historically opposed Proposition 8 and has generally supported LGBT rights in the state, signed the bill into law on July 14. Governor Brown said however that state textbooks probably would not be updated to reflect the requirements of the law until 2015.

It is supported by the GSA Network and Equality California, and the National Center for Lesbian Rights welcomed its ratification into law. The California Teachers Association's President Dean Vogel stated, “We believe that curricula should address the common values of the society, promote respect for diversity and cooperation, and prepare students to compete in, and cope with a complex and rapidly evolving society. SB 48 does that by helping to ensure that curricular materials include the contributions of persons with disabilities, lesbian, gay, bisexual, and transgender Americans to the development of California and United States.”

It is opposed by the state Republican Party and socially conservative organizations. A conservative group called Stop SB 48 collected signatures to place a referendum on the June 2012 statewide ballot, but was unsuccessful.

== Legislative history ==
Session	Bill number(s)	Date introduced	Sponsor(s)	# of cosponsors	Latest status
2010–2011	[SB 48]	December 13, 2010	Sen. Mark Leno (D-San Francisco)	5	Passed in Senate Education Committee on March 23, 2011, on a 6–3 vote. Passed by the Senate Judiciary Committee on April 4, 2011, on a 3–2 vote. Passed by the California Senate 23–14 on April 14, 2011
2010–2011	[?]	?	Assemb. Tom Ammiano (D-San Francisco)	13	Passed the Assembly (49-25) on July 5

== Criticism ==
In October, 2011, Stop SB 48 failed to collect enough signatures for the issue to be placed on a referendum in June 2012. Opponents of the bill will have other opportunities to overturn the law via a ballot initiative or a constitutional amendment. The constitutional amendment option demands even more signatures and is thus more costly. The repeal campaign has been accused of exaggerating the bill's effects in order to convince people to sign petitions. The Courage Campaign filed a formal complaint with the California Attorney General, District Attorney, and the Oceanside City Attorney on behalf of the witness, Max Disposti. The Courage campaign also started an online petition asking for an investigation into the tactics of Stop SB 48. LGBT rights groups feared that it will be difficult to defend the law if it were to go to a popular vote.

In November 2011, Stop SB 48 sent out an e-mail to their supporters telling them that they indeed plan to pursue a ballot initiative to try and repeal SB 48. There are actually two proposals that were submitted to the California Attorney General to be cleared for the collection of signatures. One seeks to outright repeal SB 48, while the other seeks to grant parents the right to opt their children out of such instruction. The initiative to repeal SB 48 failed to gather enough signatures to qualify for the ballot, gathering only about 460,000 of the 504,760 required. The other initiative was withdrawn.

== See also ==
- SaveCalifornia.com
