= Unruh Civil Rights Act =

1959 California civil rights law

The Unruh Civil Rights Act (/ˈʌnru/, colloquially the "Unruh Act") is an expansive 1959 California law that prohibits California businesses from engaging in unlawful discrimination against all persons (consumers) within California's jurisdiction, where the unlawful discrimination is in part based on a person's sex, race, color, religion, ancestry, national origin, age, disability, medical condition, genetic information, marital status, sexual orientation, citizenship, primary language, or immigration status.

The Unruh Act applies to all businesses in California including: hotels and motels, restaurants, theaters, hospitals, barber and beauty shops, housing accommodations, and retail establishments. The law was enacted in 1959 and was named for its author, Jesse M. Unruh. The Unruh Civil Rights Act is codified as Civil Code section 51.

== Text of the Act ==
"All persons within the jurisdiction of this state are free and equal, and no matter what their sex, race, color, religion, ancestry, national origin, disability, medical condition, genetic information, marital status, or sexual orientation are entitled to the full and equal accommodations, advantages, facilities, privileges, or services in all business establishments of every kind whatsoever."

== Legal interpretation and effects ==
The California Supreme Court has repeatedly "interpreted the [law] as protecting classes other than those listed on its face". For example, even prior to the 2005 addition of sexual orientation to the law's list of covered classes, the Unruh Act had been "construed as protecting gays and lesbians from arbitrary discrimination", such as in the case of Rolon v. Kulwitzky.

The California Supreme Court also decided that the act outlaws sex-based prices at bars (ladies' nights): offering women a discount on drinks, but not offering the same discount to males. In Koire v Metro Car Wash (1985) 40 Cal 3d 24, 219 Cal Rptr 133, the court held that such discounts constituted sex stereotyping prohibited by this Act.

California courts held that a private school's admissions office was not covered by the Act, because it was not a business. (A school had expelled two students who were perceived as bisexual.) "Although the fact the School is nonprofit is not controlling, this does mean it should not be deemed a business unless it has some significant resemblance to an ordinary for-profit business." Doe v. California Lutheran High School Ass'n, 170 Cal.App.4th 828 (2009).

However, schools may be businesses for the purpose of the Act when they are engaging in commercial activities. "For example, the Court noted that the School would not be permitted to discriminate in its nonmember transactions, such as in the sale of football tickets, because of the Unruh Act. Thus, while private religious schools' admissions and disciplinary practices may not be subject to the Unruh Act, schools should be aware that other business transactions may still be."

== Disability litigation ==
Since the passage of the federal Americans with Disabilities Act, disability access violations count among the practices that run afoul of the Unruh act. Combined with the California Disabled Persons Act (Civil Code Sections 54 – 55.32), disability access plaintiffs are allowed to tack on state claims for money damages onto requests for injunctive relief in ADA lawsuits. The act allows plaintiffs to claim treble damages with a minimum of $4000 per access violation plus attorneys fees. In most states, plaintiffs are entitled to only injunctive relief, having the disability access issue fixed. As a result of the damages claimed under Unruh Act, California accounts for 42% of all ADA litigation nationwide. However, in California, damages may be reduced in certain cases to $2,000 or $1,000 if construction related accessibility violations are corrected within 30–60 days of being served with a complaint.

== Modifications ==
In 2009 a proposed change, SB 242, that would have added use of language to the list of protected statuses, was vetoed by Governor Arnold Schwarzenegger. In 2015, Governor Jerry Brown signed into law SB 600, adding citizenship, primary language, and immigration status to the list of protected statuses.

== See also ==
- Politics of California
- Membership discrimination in California social clubs
