= Pink tax =

Higher pricing of products marketed to women

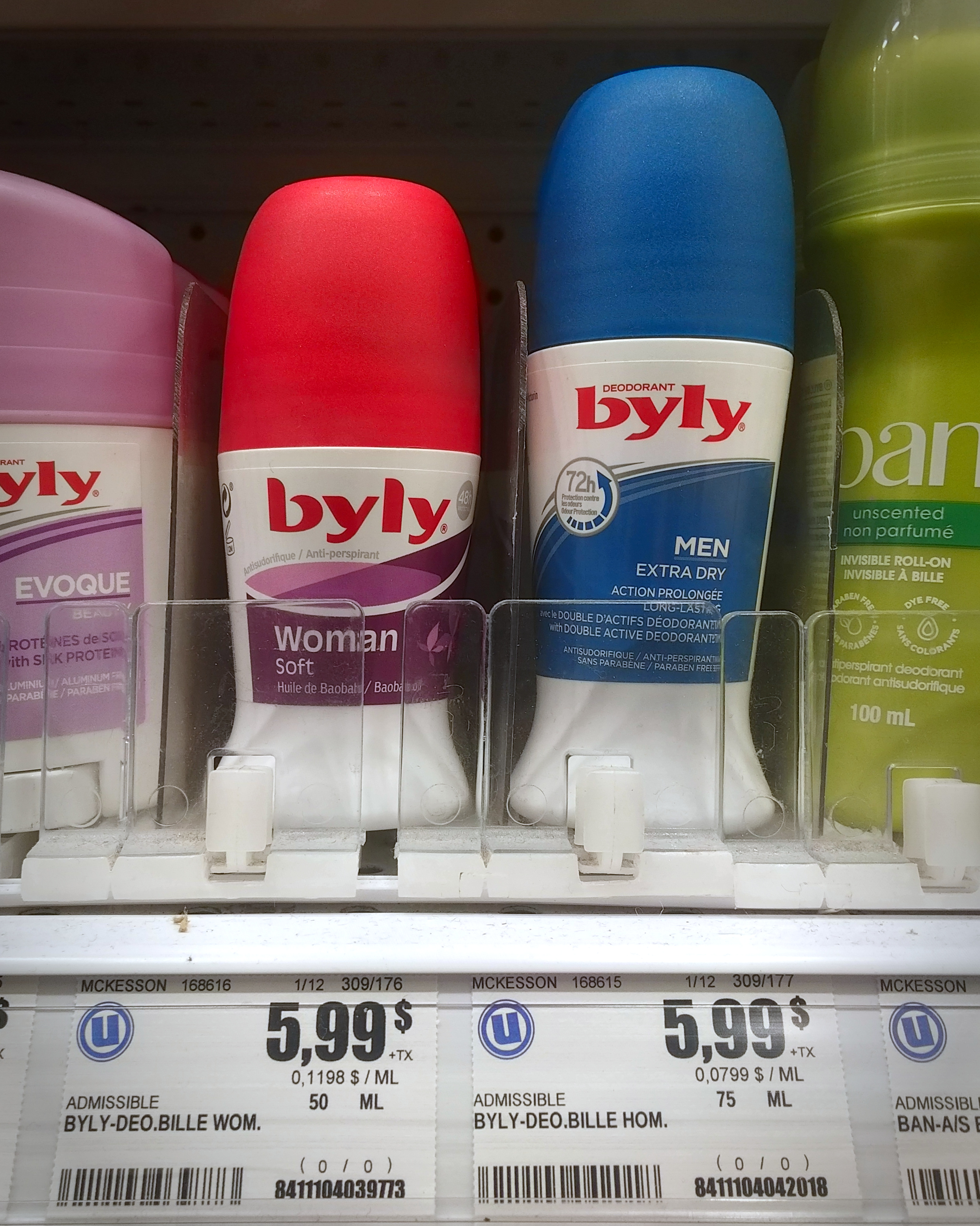
The gender-based price difference is shown between Byly deodorants for women (50 mL) vs men (75 mL). Both are sold for $5.99 CAD at Uniprix in Quebec. The women's product is 1/3 smaller.

The pink tax refers to the tendency for products marketed specifically toward women to be more expensive than those marketed toward men. The phenomenon is often attributed to gender-based price discrimination, but a research paper, conducted by economic consulting firm Cornerstone Research, posits that the primary cause is women sorting into goods with higher marginal costs. The name stems from the observation that many of the affected products are pink.

== Background ==
A 2015 study by the New York City Department of Consumer Affairs on the cost of being a female consumer concluded that women's products are typically more expensive than men's without reasonable cause. It concluded that products marketed specifically toward women cost on average 7% more than products marketed toward men. The discrepancy applies to apparel, toys, and healthcare products, among other things. In the toy sector, girls' toys cost on average 7% more than boys' toys. The study showed a side-by-side comparison of a Radio Flyer scooter where the red scooter costs $24.99 and a pink scooter, identical in all ways but color, costs $49. In children's apparel, girls' clothes were 4% more expensive than boys'. Women's clothing was 8% more expensive than men's clothing. The largest discrepancy came to personal care/hygiene products, where women's products cost 13% more than men's.

== International prevalence ==
Other countries where the pink tax has been investigated include Argentina, France, Germany, the UK, Australia, and Italy. In the UK, women and girls were being charged on average 37% more for toys, cosmetics, and clothes than their male counterparts. The UK also faces the pink tax in school uniforms. Girls' school uniforms are 12 percent more expensive than boys' uniforms. This goes for both primary and secondary school-age children who face the problem. In Singapore, a check by The Sunday Times on ten companies found that women pay more for some products and services, like dry cleaning and razors, offered by about half of these companies. Additionally, women in Singapore have to pay more premiums for Careshield Life, a national long-term care insurance scheme introduced by the government. In recent times women in Argentina pay 12 percent more than men for the same products. In 2021 the gap was at 11 percent and went up the following year in 2022.

== Pink tax causes ==
There are many reasons why the pink tax exists, including tariffs, product discrimination, and product differentiation. There are many suggested causes of this discrepancy, including price elasticity and the belief that women are more prepared than men to pay higher prices for their purchases. Other reports suggest that marketing targets women to pay higher prices as ethical consumers. Certain types of clothing, footwear, and gloves made for women and men are taxed at different levels when first entering the United States. While some tariffs are higher for men's clothing, others are higher for women's.

According to The Washington Post women are more likely to spend more money on improving their appearance, because not doing so is associated with the risk of losing revenue. Some studies showed that attractive people tend to earn higher salaries, receive higher grades in school, receive shorter prison sentences, and are more likely to be hired and promoted in the workplace.

Some people argue that product differentiation can account for a portion of the difference between the prices of men's goods and women's goods. Products like the Radio Flyer scooter may cost more due to the cost of slightly changing the product. For example, a pink scooter may cost more than a red scooter because it is more expensive to paint a scooter pink than red, assuming such a large difference for this reason of production would be because the red scooters are the larger production, and pink scooters are in the minority. However, there has never been any evidence presented, for example, that pink paint costs more than red paint or blue paint, thereby creating cost differentials in color-coded items geared toward different genders. The pink tax also arises in services like haircuts or dry cleaning. Likewise, in dry cleaning, some people hold that men's clothing tends to be more uniform while women's clothing tends to have a lot of variabilities which can make it harder to clean. They also argue that pressing machines, normally made for men's clothing, are more difficult to use on women's clothes, which results in dry-cleaners resorting to hand-pressing the clothing.

The reason those who campaign against the pink tax claim it to be so problematic is that higher prices for goods and services arise from gender alone, with no underlying economic justification such as higher costs of production in goods. Women's and men's razors are essentially the same, and distinguishing between them is simply a marketing strategy. People who have a greater need to buy a product are often willing to pay much more, leading to price discrimination. Women are often subjected to this in the tampon and menstrual pad market creating a marginalized group among women who are "period poor".

One significant cause is the gendered segmentation of consumer markets, where products are specifically marketed towards either men or women. These products are often packaged and branded distinctly to the directed gender. This segmentation allows companies to justify charging higher prices for products marketed towards women, exploiting the perception of femininity as a marketable attribute. Additionally, historical gender roles and expectations regarding personal care and hygiene contribute to the pink tax, women are often expected to invest more in grooming and appearance maintenance. Following this, the lack of transparency in pricing and limited competition in certain product categories also enable companies to implement the pink tax. Overall, the pink tax reflects much bigger systematic issues of gender inequality and discrimination in consumer markets.

== Criticism ==
Criticism of the pink tax includes the principle that the idea robs women of agency and choice by suggesting that women are so easily brainwashed by marketing that they are prevented from choosing the lesser-priced but otherwise "identical" male-marketed alternative. Instead, critics have attributed the pricing disparity to market forces, and say that if women continue to buy a more expensive pink razor, it is because they see utility or additional aesthetics for which they are willing to pay. Substantive differences in price may indicate differences in the marketability of different products. Critics argue that although seemingly identical products and services may be differently priced, the emotional experiences and perceived value are different.

A more recent study pointed out methodological flaws in the influential 2015 study from the New York City Department of Consumer Affairs: "First, the products considered in the report account for less than 6% of category sales and were not selected at random. Second, while the sample was constructed by subjectively pairing men’s and women’s products, we find that most pairs in the sample differ in their ingredients." They argue that a systematic analysis of the evidence reveals when comparing products made by the same company with the same leading ingredients, men's products were more expensive in 3 out of 5 categories. "These findings do not support the existence of a systematic price premium for women’s products." Some articles say razors are designed for different areas of hair (e.g. beard vs. leg hair).

== Economic impact ==
Activists and politicians argue that the economic impact of the pink tax is that women have less purchasing power, especially paired with the gender-based pay gap. Wage gaps and pension gaps already put women at a disadvantage when it comes to purchasing power. In the U.S., women who worked full-time had median weekly earnings of $1,083 in 2024. That is 83.2% of the men’s median weekly earnings of $1,302. The women-to-men’s earnings ratio does differ by age. For example, women ages 16 to 24 earned around 90.6 cents per male dollar, and women ages 55 and older earned approximately 76.7 cents per male dollar.

As for pensions, the estimated gap in the United States is 30% to 40%. The gap results in lower financial security for women than men in old age. Additionally, women live longer than men on average, so women may have to finance a longer retirement, which can further decrease their standard of living.

This alone gives men more money and, ultimately, more buying power. The pink tax further contributes to the economic inequality between men and women. It is also argued that paying more for goods and services marketed to women while women earn less than men means men hold the majority of the purchasing power in the economy. Taxes on feminine hygiene products that men do not need further contribute to this discrepancy.

By putting higher prices on essential products like menstrual products, personal care products, and overall increases the cost of living for women compared to men. This added financial burden exacerbates existing gender inequalities, as women already earn about 20% less than men on average. More so, the pink tax contributes to the phenomenon of "period poverty" where many women struggle to afford basic menstrual products which can affect social, emotional, and physical health. Studies have shown that women can pay thousands of dollars more over their lifetimes because of the pink tax, which furthers the wealth gap between genders. Efforts to address the pink tax, such as state-level bans and campaigns aim to alleviate some of these economic burdens faced by women, but a federal solution is still lacking. Therefore, the economic impact of the pink tax highlights the urgent need for comprehensive measures to promote gender equity and financial empowerment for all.

On a global scale, the Women's Economic Opportunity Index gap was measured to be 61.0% closed across 148 nations in 2025. Some of the OECD countries with the most significant gender pay gaps are South Korea, at around 31%, and Latvia and Israel, at just under 25%. The EU pay gap ranges from -0.7% in Luxembourg to over 17% in countries such as Germany and Austria. In some African countries, women make up to 30% less than their male counterparts. Finally, in Australia, the gender pay gap is around 17%. In developing nations, the economic participation and opportunity gender gap is typically much more pronounced due to factors such as limited access to education and employment opportunities for women.

== US legislation ==
=== Congresswoman Jackie Speier ===
Representative Jackie Speier was a member of the California State Senate from 1998 to 2006. In 2008, she was elected to the U.S. House of Representatives, representing California's 12th Electoral District until 2013 and California's 14th Electoral District from 2013 to 2023. Speier, a Democrat, is a member of the House Committee on Energy and Commerce. She speaks in support for equal rights and LGBTQ rights, and involves herself in many related organizations.

==== Pink Tax Repeal Act ====
On July 8, 2016, Speier introduced H.R. 5686, Pink Tax Repeal Act, to the House floor. The overall intention of the Pink Tax Repeal Act was to end gender-based price discrimination. She was the bill's primary sponsor.

On April 10, 2018, Speier introduced a revised version of the Pink Tax Repeal Act, H.R.5464. The 115th Congress (2017–2019) was expected to review the 2018 version. Skopos Labs, a technology company that predicts risks and opportunities, gave the bill a 1% chance of being enacted. The Pink Tax Repeal Act would mandate that any comparable products that are marketed toward men and women must be priced equally. Additionally, this bill was meant to target public policy as well as gendered marketing initiatives. A 2015 study done on U.S. tariff rates found that on average, even tariffs paid for women's goods are higher than those for men. Even average imported clothing taxes for men were 11.9% compared to 15.1% for women. The discrepancies were also included in the bill. Although Speier said she did not expect the bill to pass, she tried to push forward the conversation about gender-based price discrimination. The effects of increasing women representation are substantial. A 10% gain in seat share decreases the pink tax by approximately 0.44%.

==== Gender Tax Repeal Act ====
While in the California State Assembly, Speier introduced Assembly Bill No. 1088, also known as the Gender Tax Repeal Act, in 1995. It was similar to the Pink Tax Repeal Act, except it focused on gender-based price discrimination in services. The bill stated that businesses such as tailors, barbers, hair stylists, dry cleaners and laundries would not be permitted to discriminate for "standard services" due to a person's gender or the gender the clothing is intended for, without a valid, prominently placed written justification. The bill passed in 2001 and remains in effect. The Equal Gender Pricing Bill was proposed in 2016 aimed at consumer goods, specifically prohibiting businesses from gender biased pricing. The main opposition argument was that a bill proposed on goods would lead to litigation, especially since the process of identifying gendered pricing remains ambiguous and subjective.

=== Senator Ben Hueso (D-San Diego) ===
Democratic California State Senator Ben Hueso of San Diego proposed a new version of the Gender Tax Repeal Act, SB-899, in 2016, but withdrew the bill after pushback from the California Retailers Association. It would have banned businesses in California from charging customers different prices for similar goods on the basis of gender.

=== Delegate Jennifer Boysko, (D-Fairfax) ===
Jennifer Boysko, a Democrat of the Virginia House of Delegates, in 2018 submitted HB 24, which would exempt menstrual supplies from sales and use taxes, in response to the Tampon Tax in Virginia.

=== New York legislation ===
On September 30, 2020, a law went into effect in the state of New York as a part of the FY 2021 budget that prohibited businesses from charging different prices for "substantially similar" consumer goods or services that are marketed to different genders. It was a key element of Governor Andrew M. Cuomo's 2020 Women's Agenda.

== United Kingdom ==
=== England ===
In England, the UK Government is funding free period products to be accessed in schools, councils and public buildings.

==== Gender-Based Pricing (Prohibition) Bill ====
An early day motion directly citing the Pink tax was raised in the UK parliament by Scottish Liberal Democrat Christine Jardine in 2020 to highlight MPs concerns that women and girls pay more for basic products (including toiletries, clothes, and haircuts) than men do. Jardine proposed The Gender-Based Pricing (Prohibition) Bill . Jardine highlights that in the UK "women on average pay £200 more annually than men for the same every-day consumer goods and services" and that in some cases the only difference is the color of the item.

==== Period Products (Free Provision) Bill ====
A private member's bill to make period products freely available was introduced by Baroness Boycott, but it died on the order paper.Boycott, Rosie (2020-02-04). "Period Products (Free Provision) Bill [HL]". UK Parliament. "A Bill to provide for the provision of free period products"

=== Scotland ===
The Scottish Government is funding an initiative to put free period products in public places like schools, colleges, universities, youth club and pharmacies. Under the Period Products (Free Provision) (Scotland) Act 2021, people can access period products freely through the premises of any local council.

=== Wales ===
In Wales, the UK Government is funding free period products to be accessed in schools, colleges, hospitals, and the premises of councils.

=== Northern Ireland ===
The Northern Ireland Executive is funding a scheme to put free period products in schools and colleges. In Northern Ireland, under the Period Products (Free Provision) Act (Northern Ireland) 2022, period products have been made accessible through the premises of public buildings.

=== Crown Dependencies ===
==== Jersey ====
Period products are not exempt from GST, but are freely available at 102 locations on the island.

==== Guernsey ====
Period products are exempt from GST, but there is no plan to freely provide period products at public places-the only schemes so far have been through charitable donations.

==== Isle of Man ====
Period products are exempt from GST. The Tynwald bill is set be introduced to make period products freely accessible.

== Tampon tax ==
In the United States, there is no specialized tax on tampons or similar menstrual products. In states where sales taxes are collected, tampons and other menstrual products are taxed in much the same way as most other non-exempt items (such as toilet paper and toothpaste). There has been a recent push to carve out a special tax-exempt status for tampons and other menstrual products, and the tax on such items may be referred to as a type of pink tax called a "tampon tax". As of 2020, 30 states collect sales tax from tampons. Women leading the movement against the tampon tax are calling the tax a form of "regulatory discrimination", saying that menstruation is out of their control and that the government should not tax something that is imminent for approximately half the population. Similarly, this puts an even greater strain onto poverty-stricken households and results in a large percentage of women and young girls being unable to afford them. For instance, in a 2015 Scotland study, it was discovered that "45% of girls" had used "toilet paper, socks and newspaper to replace menstrual products" because they were unable to afford them. Australia, Canada, and the United Kingdom have voted on legislation to create special tax exemptions for tampons, but none have become laws, until January 2019, when Australia made the decision to remove their tax on feminine products.

Scotland made period products free for all in 2020 and established a legal duty on local authorities to ensure that free items such as tampons and sanitary pads are available to "anyone who needs them". The rest of the UK abolished taxes on period products in 2021. The “tampon tax” refers to the sales tax imposed on menstrual hygiene products like mentioned previously. This additional tax further burdens women financially, which contributes to the wider issue of period poverty, where estimated one in four women and girls cannot afford menstrual products. Studies show that the pink tax or tampon tax on menstrual products can be as high as 13%. This disparity contributes to what is known as the tampon tax, where women are ending up having to pay thousands of dollars more over their lifetimes due to this discriminatory pricing practice. Efforts such as the “Tampon Tax Back” campaign seek to alleviate this burden by advocating for the elimination of the sales tax on all period products in various different states. However, despite progress in some areas, the tampon tax remains a large barrier to menstrual health and financial equality for women.

In 2004, Kenya became the first nation to remove the tax on menstrual products. Additionally, since 2011, Kenya’s government has allocated around $3 million per year to distribute free sanitary products in low-income communities. Since 2004, several countries have taken similar initiatives to increase the accessibility of and lower the prices of menstrual products. India scrapped their tampon tax in July 2018 and Colombia abolished their tax on feminine hygiene products in November 2018 to help further push for gender equality. Germany's feminine products previously had a luxury tax, though at the start of 2020, they lowered the tax from 19% to the normal 7%.

In November 2019, the largest sales tax protest took place against the 33 US states still implementing the tampon tax. In 2022 CVS dropped its taxes on women's hygiene products such as tampons and announced they will be covering the sales tax on these products in the U.S. states that allow them to do so.

== Recent developments ==
Recent developments in technology, big data, and online consumerism research have found potential gender biased IT algorithms. A research study published in 2020 done at the University of Bamberg in Bamberg, Germany investigated gender specific differences in recommender systems in fashion. This study concluded that there were significant differences in price recommendations depending on which gender was being targeted, an online reflection of gender-based price discrimination. Overall, product recommendations for women generally show a 5% higher premium compared to male counterparts. Further research is being conducted about digital gender-based price discrimination. In recent U.S. news, New York passed the first prohibition on the pink tax, which went into effect in September 2020. California has introduced similar legislation.

Opposition to the Pink Tax Repeal Act came from retailers and manufacturers of women's products and clothing. The main argument is that the Pink Tax Repeal Act would be difficult to enforce and lawsuits would be forthcoming. The difference between men's and women's products is not always easy to see, they argue, so removing the pink tax would be subjective. They also alleged that the bill was unfriendly to domestic manufacturing jobs and that lowering the prices for women's products could lead to employee layoffs. Republican opposition for a recall of the tampon tax in Virginia argued that tax discrimination against products for women needed to be sorted out by changing the general tax code. They added that they supported the elimination of sales taxes overall.

As a charity campaign for the political organization EMILY's List (a political action committee which supports the election of Democratic women who are in favor of abortion rights), the satirical card game Cards Against Humanity parodied the pink tax with a "For Her" edition of its base set, which had pink packaging and was $5 more expensive. Procter & Gamble, a consumer products giant, planned to take over the women's razor startup company Billie that provides women razors at a comparable price to men. However, the Federal Trade commission filed a complaint against the acquisition, claiming that it eliminates market competition.
