= Tampon tax =

Value-added tax or sales tax charged on feminine hygiene products

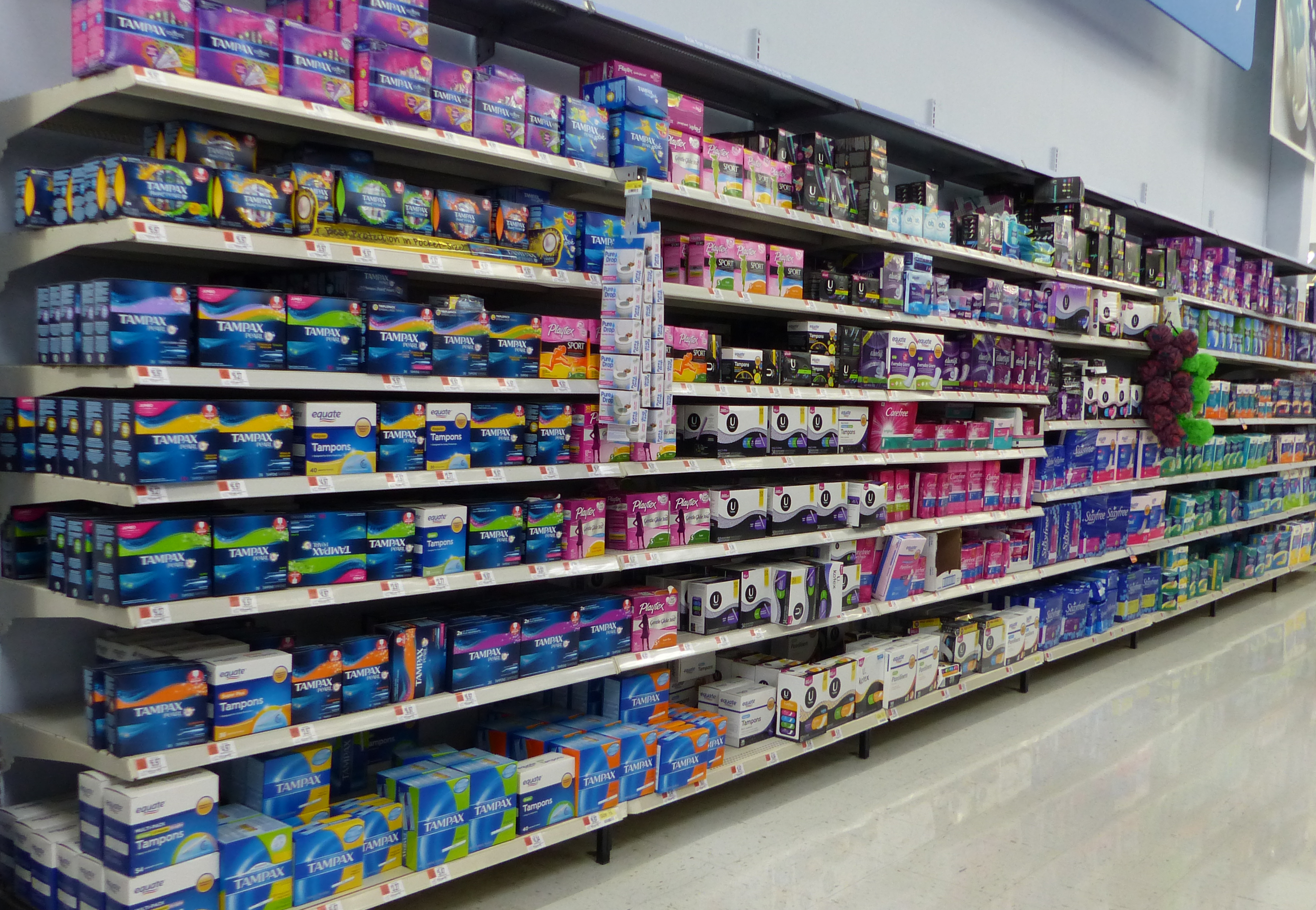
Feminine hygiene products are subject to tax in a number of countries.

Tampon tax (or period tax) is a popular term used to call attention to tampons, and other feminine hygiene products, being subject to value-added tax (VAT) or sales tax, unlike the tax exemption status granted to other products considered basic necessities. Proponents of tax exemption argue that tampons, menstrual pads, menstrual cups, and comparable products constitute basic, unavoidable necessities for women, and any additional taxes constitute a pink tax.

Proponents of tax exemption argue that tampons, sanitary napkins, menstrual cups and other products which serve the basic menstrual cycle constitute unavoidable necessities for women and should be classified alongside other unavoidable, tax-exempt necessities, such as groceries and personal medical items. The BBC estimates that women need to use feminine hygiene products for about a week each month for about 50 years. According to the American Medical Association over 17,000 menstrual hygiene items are needed in a user's lifetime amounting to a cost of around 2,000 dollars. While sales tax policy varies across jurisdictions, these products were typically taxed at the same rate as non-essential goods, such as in the United States, while other countries, such as the United Kingdom and Ireland, reduced or eliminated their general consumption tax on sanitary products. When asked about equivalent exemptions for men, proponents argue that no male products, condoms included, are comparable to feminine hygiene products, since menstruation is biological and "feminine hygiene is not a choice". However, others argue that other basic necessities such as toilet paper are still taxed in many countries, for example in the UK at 20%. As the vast majority of consumers of feminine hygiene products are women, the increased cost has been criticized as being discriminatory against women. The tampon tax is not a special tax levied directly on feminine hygiene products.

Since about 2004, many countries, including Kenya, Canada, India, Colombia, Australia, Germany, and Rwanda, have abolished or reduced sales taxes on tampons and pads.

== Tax law by jurisdiction ==
Below are examples of countries that have or used to have a tampon tax (ordered by most recent changes to the country's tax system first):

- Belize will eliminate the General Sales Tax on feminine hygiene products on April 1, 2023. They will also no longer be subject to importation duties.
- The tampon tax was abolished in Britain on January 1, 2021, following Britain's departure from the EU, meaning there is now a zero rate of VAT applying to women's sanitary products.
- Rwanda removed their VAT on all sanitary products on December 10, 2019. The change was made in response to school absences and dropouts caused by 18% of Rwandan women and girls being unable to attend school or work due to not being able to afford feminine hygiene products.
- Australia repealed the 10% tax on tampons and pads on January 1, 2019, after an 18-year campaign, after all states and territories agreed to make sanitary products explicitly exempt from the GST.
- In Colombia, on 14 November 2018, the Constitutional Court unanimously ruled to strike down a 5 per cent tax on tampons and pads on gender equality grounds.
- India eliminated its 12% tax on feminine hygiene products in 2018. This was after a year of lobbying by advocacy groups and celebrities. Actor Akshay Kumar featured as the lead male actor in Pad Man and raised awareness about the taboo on menstruation.
- Mauritius eradicated its tampon tax in 2017 following a popular online petition initiated and led by gender consultant and feminist Trisha Gukhool.
- Canada removed its tampon tax in mid-2015 following an online petition signed by thousands.
- In 2004, Kenya was the first country to abolish sales tax for menstrual products.

=== Canada ===
In January 2015, the Canadian government recognised sanitary products as an essential item, ending the GST tax on all sanitary products. The Canadian government is currently debating whether to make menstrual products free in the workplace. The Government of Canada has published a Notice of Intent to the Canadian Gazette seeking feedback on providing free products in federally regulated workplaces; stakeholders and Canadians were able to feedback until July 2, 2019. Providing free menstrual products in workplaces is expected to bring better health and workplace productivity and reduced stigma around the conversation of menstruation. Under Part II of the Canada labour Code, employers are already required to provide toilet paper, soap, warm water, and a way to dry hands. Women or gender non-conforming persons who require menstrual products make up 40% of the federal workforce, and the financial burden of sanitary products rests entirely on them, burdening or severely negatively impacting those who need them, adding required sanitation products will allow for greater equality in the workplace and more opportunity for people with lower income.

On May 28, 2015, the Canadian Federal Government voted in favour of lifting the tampon tax federally. The tax was ultimately repealed July 1, 2015. This was inspired by an online petition organized by Canadian Menstruators, an online advocacy group, which thousands of Canadians signed and presented to the Federal Government of Canada in Ottawa.

Critics have pointed out that sanitary products are still taxed under tariffs under Canadian tariff laws.

=== China ===
In China, menstrual products are subject to a 13% sales tax, the same as most consumer items.

=== European Union ===
In 2016, the United Kingdom proposed that member states should be allowed to decide whether to continue to apply VAT to menstrual hygiene products. This led to the introduction of Directive 2022/542/EC. This modified Annex III of Directive 2006/112/EC allowing "pharmaceutical products used for medical and veterinary purposes, including products used for contraception and female sanitary protection, and absorbent hygiene products" to be zero rated.

Between the proposal and the legislation, some EU countries used their limited number of reduced-rate items to decrease taxes on sanitary items.

- Ireland levies no value-added tax on tampons, panty liners, and sanitary towels. Ireland is the only EU country to have a zero tax rate on sanitary goods. The rate predates legislation restricting zero-rating (a grandfather clause).
- In Germany, the amount of tax on sanitary items was cut from 19% (the basic rate) to 7% (the reduced rate) as of January 1, 2020. This is said to be a step toward a tax system that does not discriminate against women.
- Other European countries, such as France, Spain, Portugal, and the Netherlands, either plan to or have already slashed their taxes in recent years.

=== India ===
In 2018, India scrapped the 12% Goods and Service Tax (GST) on sanitary napkins, making them tax-free. The Government of India has set up over 16000 Janaushidhi Kendras across the country that provide oxo-biodegradable sanitary napkins named 'Suvidha' at Rs. 1/- per pad. These sanitary napkins are also environmental friendly. The cumulative sales of Suvidha Napkins as on 30.11.2025 is 96.30 Crores. Approximately 88% of women in India are unable to acquire safe menstrual products because of a lack of access to capital. The menstrual products are not thought to be essential, therefore overpriced, and out of reach for over 70% of Indian women who menstruate.

=== Kenya ===
In 2004, Kenya became the first country to exempt menstrual products from Value Added Tax. In 2011, Kenya exempted imported menstrual products from excise tax. In 2016, Kenya exempted the raw materials used for the manufacture of menstrual products from the 16% value added tax (VAT) and 25% excise tax.

The government also allocated Ksh 240M to provide free sanitary pads to girls in public governmental schools through the National Sanitary Towel Programme. This increased to Ksh 400M in 2015. However, this funding declined to 260M in the 2022/2023 budget.

In 2016, the Kenyan parliament introduced an amendment to the Basic Education Act which guaranteed the provision of free, sufficient and quality sanitary towels to every girl child registered and enrolled in a public basic education institution who has reached puberty and the provision of a safe and environmentally sound mechanism for disposal of the sanitary towels. These began to be distributed in 2018. The government established a Menstrual Hygiene Management Policy in 2019.

=== United Kingdom ===
There is a zero rate of VAT applied to most women's sanitary products in the UK. The United Kingdom had levied a value-added tax on sanitary products since it joined the European Economic Community in 1973. This rate was reduced to 5% specifically for sanitary products in 2000 with lobbying from Member of Parliament Dawn Primarolo saying that this reduction was "about fairness, and doing what we can to lower the cost of a necessity". This is the lowest rate possible under the European Union's value added tax law, which as of 2016 does not allow a reduction to zero rates. The only goods that can be zero-rated are those with historic zero rates that have been applied continually since before 1991. The UK Independence Party raised the issue in the 2015 general election with promised to withdraw from the European Union and allow the zero rate. Prime Minister David Cameron commented, when prompted, that the tampon tax campaign was "long-standing" and a complicated issue within the European Union. In England, one in ten women between 14 and 21 cannot afford menstrual management products.

Laura Coryton led a "Stop taxing periods, period" campaign with an online petition to have the European Union remove the value-added tax for sanitary products. Her petition was highlighted by a further protest in London and a sister march in Bristol headed by the groups, No More Taboo and Period Watch. Lucy Whitehill created and led the London march on April 2, 2015, which garnered support from 2,500 protesters, many wearing bloodied white pants, chanting outside Downing Street. Her slogan "Tampons not a necessity? Then welcome to the world where we don't wear them" made the headlines, with Russell Howard focusing on the viral placard, "The Taxman can suck my clit", Ed Miliband called the tax ridiculous and Caroline Criado Perez demanded the tax to be abolished. Following the protest the University of Sheffield were the first to cull the tax in their university shops. In November 2015, Charlie Edge and Ruth Howarth free-bled in front of Parliament to further drive awareness. George Osborne mentioned the petition by name in his 2015 Autumn Statement pledge to end the tampon tax at the European Union level. The petition platform's CEO cited the campaign as an example of successful clicktivism, with over 320,000 signatures. In March 2016, Parliament created legislation to eliminate the tampon VAT, following a budget amendment by opposition Labour MP Paula Sherriff. It was expected to go into effect by April 2018 but did not do so; several British women protested for it publicly while displaying blood stains from their periods. On October 3, 2018, new EU VAT rules were put forward by the European Parliament to allow EU countries to stop taxing sanitary products, but these did not come into effect until 2022. The UK left the EU in January 2020, and following the end of the transition period (at the beginning of 2021) the tampon tax was abolished in the UK, meaning there is now a zero rate of VAT applying to women's sanitary products. Research published by Tax Policy Associates in November 2022 suggested that savings resulting from the abolition of the tax had been retained by retailers, rather than passed onto women. Period underwear remained subject to the tax until 2024 and was included in the exemption after campaigners raised the issue.

==== Scotland ====
In July 2017, a pilot programme began in Scotland to have free sanitary products available at schools and food banks for women who cannot afford them. The pilot scheme was launched for six months in Aberdeen, with £42,500 of funding from the devolved Scottish Government in order to address the growing scandal of "period poverty". It was believed that 1,000 girls would benefit from the scheme, as there were reports of teenage girls using tissues, toilet rolls, torn T-shirts, and even newspapers as makeshift sanitary products, with some girls even skipping school altogether. It was decided to launch the scheme to improve attainment and school attendance, as well as improve confidence amongst teenage girls during their period; Scotland is believed to be the first country in the world to give out free sanitary products as part of a government-sponsored initiative. Further to this half-year pilot programme, Scotland's opposition Labour Party stated their intention to introduce a bill to make this permanent.

A study by the WHO and UNICEF showed that one out of five women in Scotland have been forced to improvise with items, including toilet paper and old clothes, because of the high cost of commercial products.

The Scottish government in 2019 began providing free sanitary products for poorer students at schools, with hopes that this would be rolled out across the entire nation.

A bill to make period products available for free to everyone who needs them received preliminary approval in the Scottish Parliament in February 2020 and Members for the Scottish Parliament (MSPs) approved The Period Products (Free Provision) (Scotland) Act on Tuesday 24 November 2020. Local authorities in Scotland now have a legal duty to ensure that tampons and sanitary pads are available freely to "anyone who needs them". The bill was introduced by Labour MSP Monica Lennon who began campaigning to end period poverty in 2016. She stated that "Periods don't stop for pandemics and the work to improve access to essential tampons, pads and reusables has never been more important". The measure requires the provision of free period products in schools, colleges, and universities, as well as football clubs, restaurants, pubs, and public concert halls.

The act will impose a legal duty on the local authorities to make period products available free of cost. With this act Scotland became the first country in the world to provide universal access to free period products.

=== United States ===
US states taxing tampons as of June 2024 Tampons taxed Tampons not taxed No state sales tax

Menstrual hygiene products are considered by many states within the United States as "tangible individual property," resulting in additional sales tax. This additional tax increases the overall price and further limits accessibility to menstrual hygiene products for lower-income women. These products are classified as medical devices but are not eligible for purchase through government-funded assistance programs.

In the United States, almost all states tax "tangible individual property" but exempt non-luxury "necessities": groceries, prescriptions, prosthetics, agriculture supplies, and sometimes clothes—the exemptions vary between states. Most states charge sales tax for women's pads and tampons. Five states do not have a state sales tax (Alaska, Delaware, Montana, New Hampshire, and Oregon), and as of June 2019, thirteen US states specifically exempted essential hygiene products: Utah, Ohio, California, Connecticut, Florida, Illinois, Maryland, Massachusetts, Minnesota, New Jersey, New York, Nevada, Pennsylvania, and Rhode Island. California repealed the tax in its 2019 state budget, but only for the two-year duration of the budget. Seven other states have introduced such legislation, most recently Nebraska, Virginia, and Arizona. In November 2021, Michigan ended its tampon tax.

Many federal assistance programs such as SNAP (Supplemental Nutrition Assistance Program) and WIC (Women, Infants and Children) do not allow the use of those funds for products such as pads or tampons despite the products' classification as medical devices. The IRS does not classify female products as medical devices, thus blocking women from buying them with pre-tax dollars in both flexible spending accounts and health savings accounts.

Recently, there is a movement to ensure access to the basic necessity of menstrual products for women.

The movement of menstrual equity has been gaining traction in recent years. This movement is based on the central tenet that period products should be affordable and accessible to women who menstruate. The movement aims to reduce the stigma around menstruation that has prevented legislative action toward achieving menstrual equity and reproductive education. Significant barriers to menstrual equity are the costs that affect women in shelters, low-income women and their daughters, LGBTQ people with uteruses, and those facing housing insecurity.

In 2019, House representative Grace Meng introduced the Menstrual Equity for All bill. The bill would ensure menstrual products are free and unrationed in schools, jails, shelters, and all public federal buildings with federal funds. This bill proposes that menstrual products be covered under Medicaid to limit financial barriers for low-income women. The bill would also mandate large employers to provide free period products to employees. Since being introduced in the House, the bill is under review by the appropriate subcommittee.

There have been some changes to the tampon taxes, but most of these changes are at the state or city level. On a smaller scale, individual cities have also changed their laws in favor of eliminating the tampon tax (e.g. Denver, Colorado). Maine eliminated the tax in 2022.

==== California ====
California Assemblywoman Cristina Garcia reported that California women each pay roughly US$7 per month over 40 years, constituting US$20 million in annual taxes. Garcia and Ling Ling Chang proposed a bill to remove the tampon tax in early 2016. At this time, only a handful of the country's states exempted tampons, and several others had no state sales tax. Garcia held that women were taxed "for being women" and bore an economic burden for having no other choice but to buy these products. Garcia and Chang added that the tax was "regulatory discrimination" that disproportionately affected poor women and women of color, and that it likely persisted due to social taboos against discussing menstruation. Both houses of the California State Legislature voted to exempt tampons from taxation in June 2016, but the bill was vetoed by the state's governor, Jerry Brown, three months later.

California Governor Jerry Brown vetoed AB-1561 due to the potential loss of money in taxing feminine hygiene products. In response, Cristina Garcia co-authored AB-0479: Common Cents Tax Reform Act with Lorena Gonzalez Fletcher, which is a new measure outlining a solution to offset the feminine product and diaper tax exemption by increasing the tax on hard liquor. This bill was ultimately gutted and amended with provisions on workers' compensation.

In 2017, the California State Legislature passed AB 10 (Ch. 687), requiring public middle schools and high schools where at least 40% of students meet the federal poverty level to stock half of the restrooms with free tampons and sanitary napkins. The law was passed to eliminate the cost burden and keep low-income students in schools during their menstrual cycle.

Companies involved in supplying the necessary feminine hygiene products (tampons and pads) for complete menstrual care in the restrooms of schools include WAXIE and Hospeco. They also supply various options for menstrual product dispensers that have a time delay mechanism to prevent products from being overused and/or abused.

In June 2019, menstrual products were exempted from the sales tax in the state budget, but only for the two-year duration of the budget.

In July 2021, California passed AB 150, making the menstrual product tax exemption permanent.

In September 2021, California passed AB 367, requiring public schools grades 6–12, California State University and community college districts, as well as encouraging the Regents of the University of California and private institutions of higher learning to provide free menstrual products.

==== New York ====
In July 2016, New York State exempted feminine hygiene products from taxation, reducing the state's tax revenue by an estimated US$10 million annually. In the court case of the "Tampon Tax", attorney Zoe Salzman defended the movement of repealing the taxes on feminine menstrual products. Part of the case was also a plea for refunding the women for all of the taxes that they had to pay on feminine menstrual products in the past. Ultimately, the case ruled to repeal the taxes on feminine menstrual products but not to refund the women of New York the previous taxes. Connecticut and Illinois also removed their tax in 2016, with Florida following suit in 2017.

==== New Jersey ====
A 2018 empirical study on New Jersey's 2005 tax break on menstrual products found that "repealing tampon taxes removes an unequal tax burden and could make menstrual hygiene products more accessible for low-income consumers". The study utilized data from more than 16,000 purchases in 2004–2006 made in New Jersey, Delaware, Connecticut, Maryland, and Pennsylvania, using these latter nearby states as the control group. Through a differences-in-differences approach, they found that after the repeal, consumer prices on menstrual products decreased by 7.3% relative to the control states. This was greater than the 6.9% sales tax, suggesting that the consumers benefitted from the tax break. Upon further analysis, the study also found that the decrease in consumer prices was greater for low-income consumers than high-income consumers (3.9% decrease versus 12.4% decrease). This suggests that low-income consumers received the most benefit from the tax break, while high-income consumers shared the benefit with producers of menstrual products.

==== Washington ====
On July 1, 2020, Washington became the 20th state to remove tax from menstrual products.

==== Michigan ====
On November 5, 2021, Michigan Governor Gretchen Whitmer signed into law bill SB 153 repealing the tax on feminine hygiene products. The bill went into effect 90 days later on February 3, 2022.

==== Other states ====
Many states that have tampon taxes have tried to repeal or eliminate the tax via legislation and have been denied. US states such as Tennessee, Arizona, and Virginia have introduced legislation. In Utah, Representative Susan Duckworth introduced a bill that would have exempted menstrual hygiene products from sales tax, titled "Hygiene Tax Act". Products exempted included such items as tampons and disposable diapers. Legal scholars point out that when the bill was sent to the Utah taxation committee to be voted on, eight of the eleven men voted against the bill. In November 2019, during a “special legislative session” and a Governor's signature, Utah became the thirteenth US state to abolish the tampon tax, effective from January 1, 2020.

In November 2019, Ohio became the 12th US state to repeal the pink or tampon tax. Both Representatives Greta Johnson and Brigid Kelly introduced the bills for years and finally became law in November 2019 – that would exempt feminine menstrual products from the state's sales tax. Legal scholars note that Ohio women still have to pay around four million dollars each year due to taxes on these items as they are not exempt from local taxes.

In Tennessee, the same bill was sent to the Senate and House to reduce the 7% sales tax on feminine products, defined as "any product to be used by women with respect to menstruation ... [including] tampons, pads, liners, [and] cups". Both the Senate and the House did not pass the bill.

In Virginia, Delegate Mark Keam introduced House Bill 952. The bill wanted to exempt the same products as Ohio and Utah from the 5.3% sales tax. Like the other two states, the bill was not passed.

== Activism ==
Supporters of the exemption of said taxes are calling their efforts "menstrual equity", explaining it as a social movement that strives for feminine products like tampons to be considered necessities. Activists are often led by members of the government. At the beginning of 2016, Councilwoman Julissa Ferreras-Copeland led a movement with a tampon tax pilot project, ultimately providing free pads and tampons at a local high school in Queens, New York. Ferreras-Copeland's effort has now been expanded into 25 different schools around New York City. Other democrats, including Ydanis Rodriguez and Council Speaker Melissa Mark-Viverito, are advocating for state legislature to stop taxing sanitary products.

Free the Tampon, an advocate for free menstrual products estimates that it would cost less than $5 a year per user to provide tampons and pads in restrooms at schools and businesses.

Activists with United for Access organized a petition and march to put pressure on the US Department of Education to eradicate period poverty in the US. They called on the government to treat period products as health necessities, support policies that protect students who menstruate, and fund period products in school bathrooms. The campaign was built in partnership with the period poverty-focused nonprofit founded by social entrepreneur, Nadya Okamoto. Okamoto is also the author of the book, Period Power: a Manifesto for the Menstrual Movement, which focuses heavily on advocating against the "tampon tax". When Okamoto was 21 years old, she led her organization to host the first-ever National Period Day on October 19, 2019, which focused on pushing legislators to eliminate the "tampon tax". On National Period Day 2019, the organization supported local organizers to host 60 rallies in all 50 states.

Slovakia levies a 20% tax on sanitary products—the basic goods rate. A Slovak film director commented that there are no plans to change the law and that east Europe missed elements of feminist change while living under communist government.

Other campaigns have emerged, such as #Freeperiods, encouraging state policies to provide menstrual products. #Freeperiods is a campaign started by Amika George, who started a petition aimed at encouraging the UK government to provide low-income families with subsidised menstrual products. This campaign since then has grown exponentially. The Free periods initiative has recently paired up with The Red Box Project, which is a community-based initiative that provides free menstrual products and underwear to young women who struggle financially. The Red Box Projects notes the importance of their initiative as, according to #Freeperiods, one out of 10 girls cannot afford to purchase menstrual products, and over 137,000 girls have missed school due to period poverty.

Within the Global North, tampon activism has been strong and well-supported. Countries are moving forward and either removing tampon taxes or providing free menstrual products. In 2018, the Scottish Government moved forward and became the first country to provide free menstrual products for students at schools and universities. Additionally, other countries have moved forward in implementing policies around providing sanitary products and abolishing taxes on menstrual products. Kenya and Uganda moved forward and removed taxes on these products. Furthermore, the Kenyan government also provides funding to schools that provide pads.

== See also ==
- Culture and menstruation
- Gender-based price discrimination in the United States
- Period underwear
