= Universal access to education =

Ability of all people to have equal opportunity in education

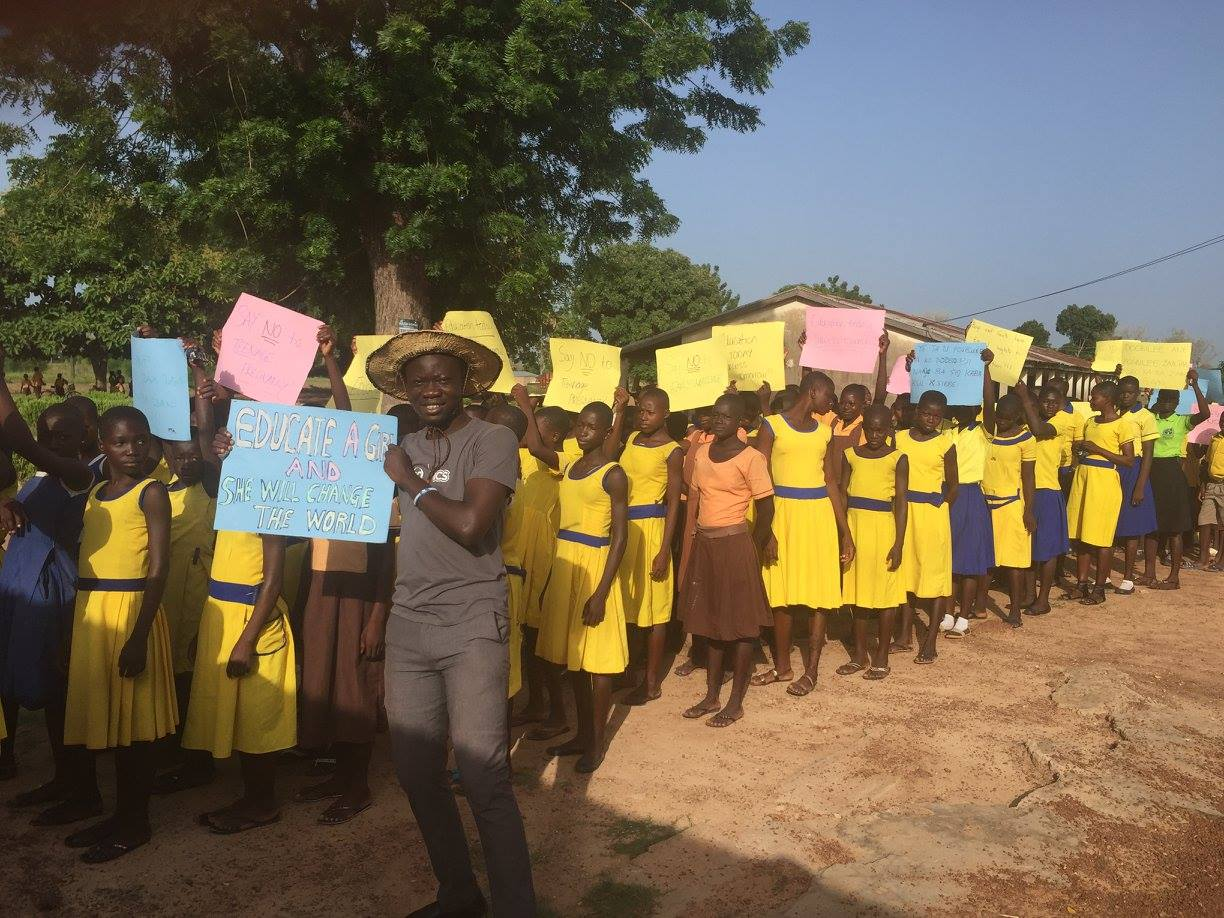
Students and teachers in Ghana in a parade for inclusive education.

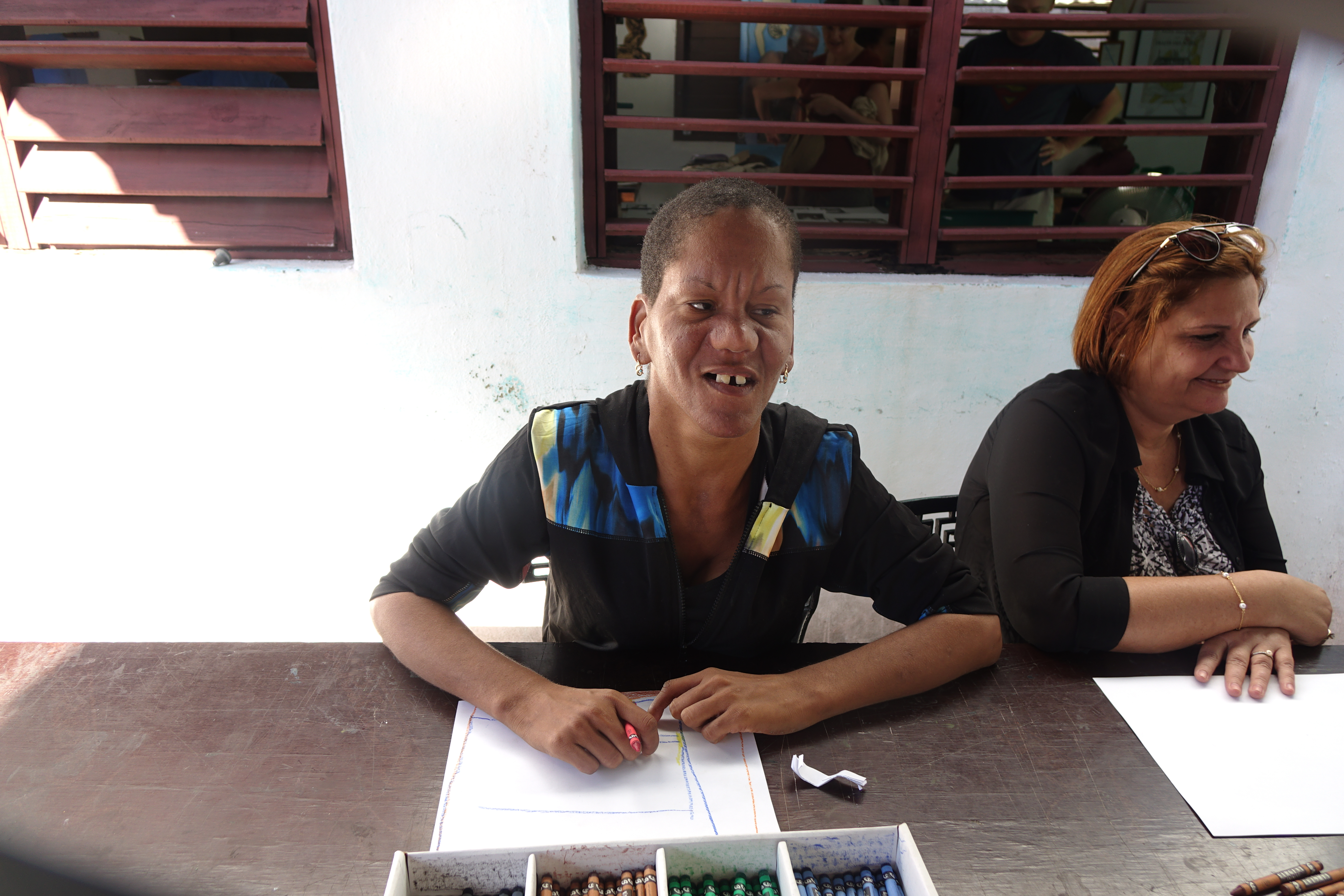
Cienfuegos, a non-profit group teaching art to people with disabilities in Cuba.

Universal access to education is the ability of all people to have equal opportunity in education, regardless of their social class, race, gender, sexuality, ethnic background or physical and mental disabilities. The term is used both in college admission for the middle and lower classes, and in assistive technology for disabled people. Some critics feel that this practice in higher education, as opposed to a strict meritocracy, causes lower academic standards. In order to facilitate the access of education to all, countries have right to education.

Universal access to education encourages a variety of pedagogical approaches to accomplish the dissemination of knowledge across the diversity of social, cultural, economic, national and biological backgrounds. Initially developed with the theme of equal opportunity access and inclusion of students with learning or physical and mental disabilities, the themes governing universal access to education have now expanded across all forms of ability and diversity. However, as the definition of diversity is within itself a broad amalgamation, teachers exercising universal access will continually face challenges and incorporate adjustments in their lesson plan to foster themes of equal opportunity of education.

As universal access continues to be incorporated into the U.S. education system, professors and instructors at the college level are required (in some instances by law) to rethink methods of facilitating universal access in their classrooms. Universal access to college education may involve the provision of a variety of different assessment methods of learning and retention. For example, in order to determine how much of the material was learned, a professor may enlist multiple methods of assessment. Methods of assessment may include a comprehensive exam, unit exams, portfolios, research papers, literature reviews, an oral exam or homework assignments. Providing a variety of ways to assess the extent of learning and retention will help identify the gaps in universal access and may also elucidate the ways to improve universal access.

As part of the United Nations Convention on the Rights of the Child, Universal Education for All (EFA) children were adopted according to the United Nations in 1989. The limitation of education existed for students living with disabilities despite international declarations.

== Non-discrimination and equality in education ==
Examples of marginalized groups

Human rights are internationally recognized as universal rights, therefore meaning it applies to everyone equally and without discrimination. However, a significant number of individuals miss out on education due to discrimination preventing access to education.

Discrimination occurs most prominently in terms of accessing education. For example, girls can face gender-based barriers such as child marriage, pregnancy, and gender-based violence which often prevent them from going to school or contribute to them dropping-out of school. People with disabilities often face literal accessibility issues, such as a lack of ramps or insufficient school transportation, making it more difficult to get to school. Migrants often face administrative barriers that prevent them from enrolling, effectively barring them from education systems.

Girls are dropped out of school to assist their families with domestic labour. Due to limited resources, sons are sent to school rather than girls.. Uniforms, tuition fees, textbooks, teacher salaries and school maintenance are part of hindrances to education. Poverty is a significant barrier accessing education. In sub-Saharan Africa, children from the richest 20% of households reach ninth grade at eleven times the rate of those from the poorest 40% of households.

However, discrimination also occurs within education systems when certain groups receiving an inferior quality of education compared with others, for instance, the quality of education in urban schools tends to be higher than that found in rural areas.

Discrimination also happens after education where different groups of people are less likely to draw the same benefits from their schooling. For example, educated boys tend to leave school with higher wage potential than equally educated girls.

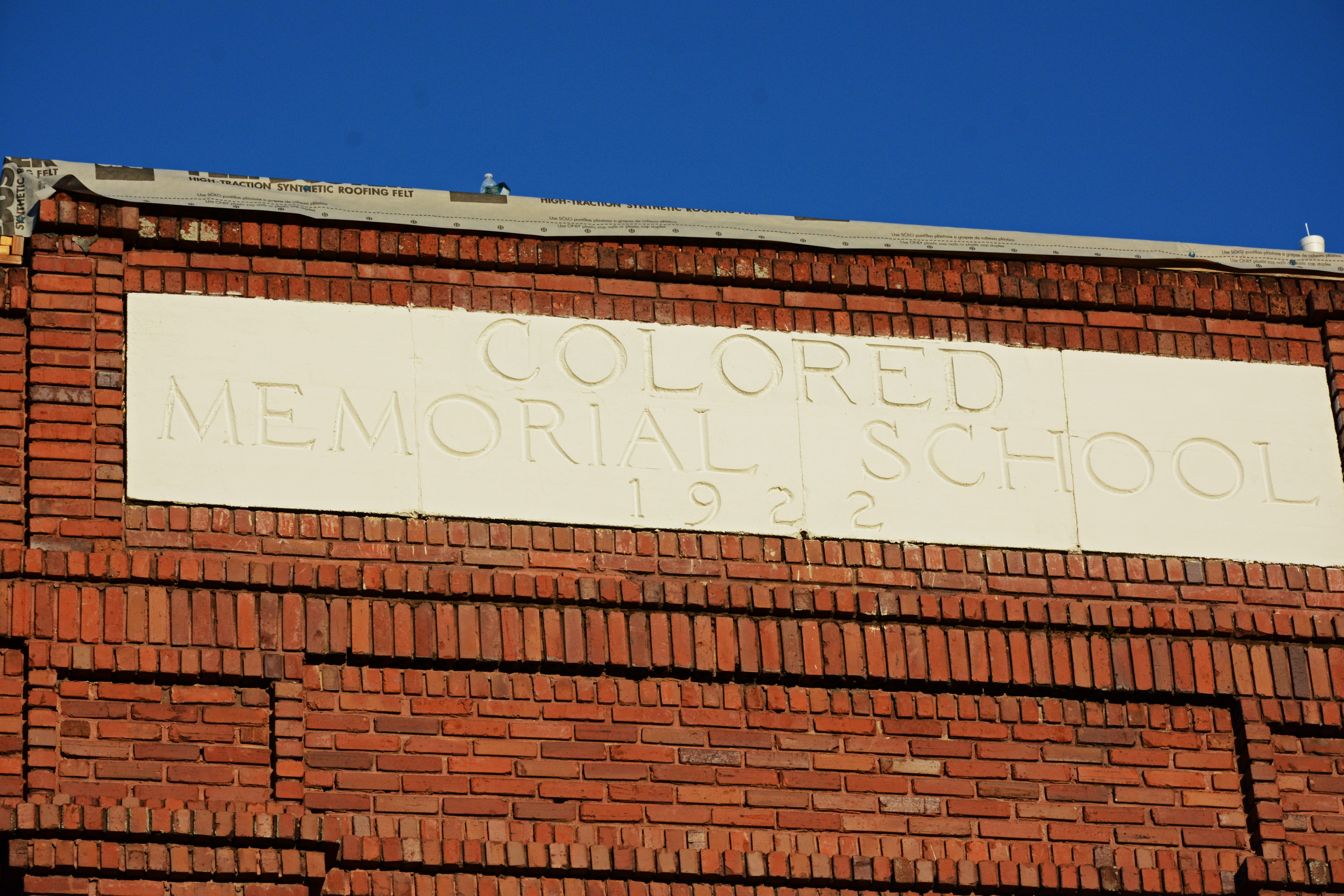
Colored Memorial School of Brunswick, Georgia was built in 1922

Non-discrimination and equality provisions found in international human rights law (IHRL) exist to ensure that the principle that international human rights are universal is applied in practice. Non-discrimination and equality are not abstract concepts under international human rights law (IHRL). They are elaborated human rights that have been developed over decades to address the discrimination that people face daily. Particularly education where the rights to non-discrimination and equality have been applied to the right to education across numerous human rights treaties, including one dedicated to the issue, known as UNESCO Convention against Discrimination in Education.

Despite the strength of non-discrimination and equality law, eliminating discrimination and inequalities is a challenge that individual states and the international community face. This was acknowledged in 2015 when the international community vowed to 'leave no one behind'.

International and regional human rights treaties apply the rights to non-discrimination and equality to the right to education of specific marginalised groups. Marginalized groups are those who have suffered prolonged and historical discrimination, usually, but not exclusively, on the basis of identity (gender, for example), characteristics (ethnicity, race), or circumstance (refugees, migrants, internally displaced persons). Marginalized groups are very likely to be subject to multiple, compound, or intersectional forms of discrimination.

Examples of marginalised groups include:

- girls and women
- national, ethnic, and linguistic minorities
- people with disabilities
- indigenous people
- migrants
- refugees
- asylum-seekers
- stateless persons
- internally displaced persons (IDPs)
- persons in detention / persons deprived of liberty
- people living in poverty
- people living in rural areas
- people affected by HIV
- people affected by albinism
- LGBTQI
- older people
- pregnant girls and adolescent mothers
- people living in countries or areas affected by armed conflict

== Access to education in racial minorities ==
In the context of post-secondary education, there exists a lack of access to education that disproportionately affects minority students. The number of students who pursue higher education heavily relies on the number of students that graduate from high school. Since the late 1970s, the rate in which young adults between the ages of 25 and 29 years old have graduated from high school and received a diploma or the equivalent has stagnated between 85 and 88 percent. In terms of race, there is a statistical gap between minority groups' rates of graduation and white students' rates of graduation. In 2006, the rate of high school graduation was 93 percent, for Black students was 86 percent, and for Hispanic students was 63 percent.

Although minority college attendance has increased throughout the years, the disparity has remained. In terms of completing high school, in 2010, white (47 percent) and Asian (66 percent) students were more likely to have graduated from high school. In comparison, only 39 percent of Pacific Islanders, 37 percent of Black students, 31 percent of Hispanics, and 28 percent of Native Americans completed high school. This transfers over to the numbers of students in minority groups who have enrolled in college, even though these students have great aspirations to attend college. When examining enrollment numbers, Black (23 percent) and Hispanic (19 percent) students enrolled into and attended 2-year and 4-year universities at lower rates, compared to white (45 percent), Asian (53 percent), and multiracial (37 percent) students. However, Black and Hispanic students are more likely to enroll into 2-year universities.

=== Causes of disparities ===
The disparity in access to higher education is primarily due to a difference in college readiness these students experience. College readiness refers to how prepared for higher education students are. Although there are several ways to define it, college readiness involves measuring four aspects of student performance: basic skills, knowledge of certain content areas, grade point averages (GPA), and college knowledge, also referred to as social capital. Basic skills include being able to read, write and think analytically about situations; content areas that students should have knowledge of include English and mathematics. Both aspects are crucial to college readiness because of their real-world application, and if a student is not proficient in these two areas, they are less likely to even pursue university. However, for many minority students they do not meet the basic requirements for colleges and universities.

In terms of GPA and college knowledge, racial disparities exist. Regarding GPA, the gap in school performance between minority and white students is significant. This gap can influence minority students' aspirations towards attending college, which affects minority enrollment rates. In terms of college knowledge, many minority students do not have access to social capital because of the lack of resources catered to them to ensure their success. There also is a lack of knowledge among minority students about what resources are available, especially because many of them are first-generation students.

=== Work towards better access ===
Although racial disparities in college readiness exist, there are several ways to counteract them. One way involves the way that students' communities support them. Their counselors, teachers, and parents must work with them to ensure that their school records, academic records, and such are accurately conveyed to colleges and universities. Other crucial factors that would contribute to higher rates of minority enrollment include encouraging students through policies and rewards for focusing on information pertaining to college, providing schools with the necessary resources, and cultivating the classroom environment to be encouraging of students' skills so that they are better prepared for college. Organizations like the National Association for College Admission Counseling should also be more aware of this issue as well as do more to bring more attention to these disparities. Changes also must occur on an institution level for minority students to better succeed.

Programs like the ones developed at the University of Maryland, Baltimore County work towards eliminating disparities in higher education access in minority students. Their programs mostly focus on minorities having better access and getting more involved in science, technology, engineering, and mathematics (STEM) fields. One program, the Meyerhoff Scholars Program, aids students by addressing the social capital aspect college readiness. This program connects students to financial resources as well as academic and social support, and they also receive research opportunities and connect with on-campus staff members. Other programs like the ACTiVATE program and the Partnerships for Innovation Program have stemmed from the Meyerhoff Scholars Program. These have pushed minority students towards success in accessing and completing post-secondary education, especially in STEM fields. Other programs across the country have also aided minority students in succeeding in higher education.

== Access to education by law ==
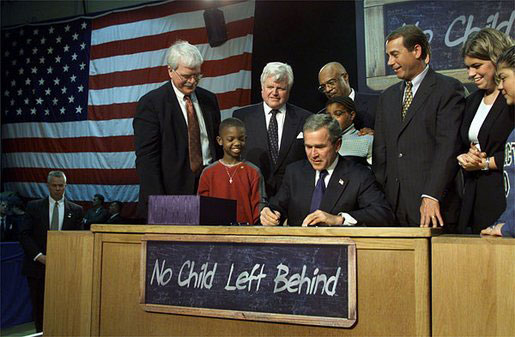
President George W. Bush signing the No Child Left Behind Act

In 2009, both the houses of the Indian Parliament and the President of India both signed and approved a bill that would grant free, legally-mandated education for children ages six to fourteen. It was considered a major step towards universal education for all. Muchkund Dubey author of the article "The Right of Children to Free and Compulsory Education Act, 2009 : The Story of Missed Opportunity" discusses and highlights the issues of access, quality of education, financial implication, and discrimination.

In the United States, Brown vs. Board of Education was a landmark decision because it found and declared that, "separate educational facilities are inherently unequal". This began the process of desegregation in many schools that had not desegregated yet. The significance of Brown vs. Board was the universal right of all students to attend educational institutions equally rather than using racial segregation to separate students. Jonathan Kozol, author of The Shame of the Nation, talks about how "physical conditions in these newly integrated schools were generally more cheerful…state of mind among the teachers and the children [was] more high-spirited" in the aftermath of desegregation.

== Universal access ==
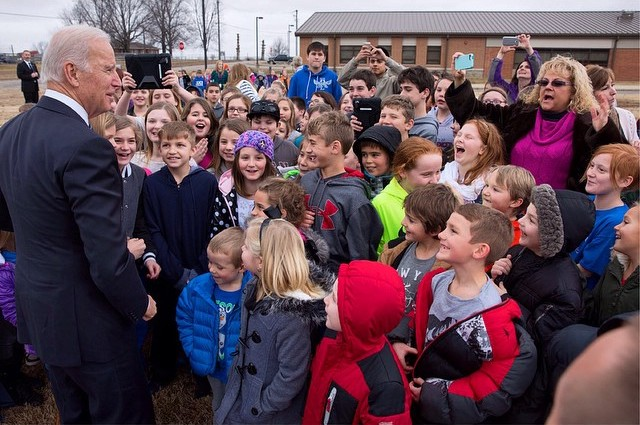
Joe Biden speaking with school children

Universal Access to education is defined as having equal opportunities to take part in any educational system. However, some individuals, groups, or ethnic groups face barriers to equal access. The United States is credited with the current idea of universal access as a concern for handicapped persons. Two international agencies (World Health Organization and World Bank) estimated that around one billion people all over the world have various types of disabilities. Between 93 and 150 million of them are children. Plan International revealed that these kids are less likely to attend school, and if enrolled, they are often separated from their peers. The Global Partnership for Education said approximately 90 percent of children with disabilities from low and middle income nations are out of school. Historically, these students have been excluded from the ordinary education system and referred to special learning schools.

Despite all improvements made, education up to this day is inaccessible to millions of schoolchildren globally. Over 72 million children of primary education age are out of school, and around 759 million adults are uneducated. They do not have the resources for developing the situation of themselves, their families, and their countries. Poverty leads to lack of education. In almost all countries (developing and developed), children face barriers to education as a result of inequalities that emanate from health, gender, and cultural identity like religion, language, and ethnic origin. Factors associated with poverty include unemployment, illiteracy among parents, and ailments increase the possibility of non-schooling and dropout rates. Universal primary education is widely known as a major issue for many nations. The majority of these developing states do not possess the financial resources needed to build schools, provide books and other materials, and recruit, train, and pay teachers. The Sub-Saharan African region is the most affected region in the world as roughly 32 million African children are still uneducated. This is followed by Central and East Asia as well as the Pacific with over 27 million children uneducated. However, observers noted that universal access to education remains an attainable goal by 2030.

== See also ==
- Free education
- Education For All
- Inclusive education
- List of countries by literacy rate
- Right to education
- Universal primary education
- Universal basic education
- Sustainable Development Goals
- Sustainable Development Goal 4

== Sources ==
This article incorporates text from a free content work. Licensed under CC BY-SA 3.0 IGO. Text taken from Right to education handbook, 276, UNESCO, Right to Education Initiative (UK), UNESCO. UNESCO.
