= Laura Coryton =

British feminist activist (born 1993)

Laura Coryton MBE
- Born: 28 May 1993 (age 33)
- Education: Goldsmiths, University of London; University of Oxford; Royal Holloway University of London
- Occupations: Campaigner; feminist activist; author
- Known for: Founder of Stop Taxing Periods
- Notable work: Speak Up! (2019)
- Honours: Member of the Order of the British Empire

Laura Coryton MBE (born 28 May 1993) is a British campaigner, feminist activist and author. She is the founder of Stop Taxing Periods, a campaign to abolish the tampon tax in the United Kingdom and make menstrual products exempt from VAT. Coryton's online petition successfully lobbied the UK Parliament into establishing the Tampon Tax Fund in 2016, through which almost £100m was donated to female-focused charities. Her campaign succeeded in 2021 when the tax on all period products was axed.

Coryton also runs the Relationships and Sex Education (RSE) social enterprise Sex Ed Matters, dedicated to making quality and confidence-building sex education accessible to everyone, for which she won UKRI's Young Innovator Award 2023 and Women in Innovation Award 2024. In the 2024 UK general election, she stood as the Labour Party parliamentary candidate for Richmond Park. Her first book Speak Up! was published by HarperCollins UK in 2019, translated into French in 2021 and in the USA in 2022.

For her work, Coryton was appointed Member of the Order of the British Empire (MBE) in the 2024 New Year Honours for services to Charitable Campaigning. She also joined the Obama Foundation as a European Leader in 2022, joined the Department for Education's Period Poverty Taskforce in 2020, and was named one of The Observer's and Nesta's 2016 New Radicals. In December 2016, the BBC included her in their list of "Five women who aren't on Wikipedia but should be".

== Education and career ==
Coryton was born on 28 May 1993. She grew up and went to school in Devon. She graduated from Goldsmiths, University of London in 2015 and worked for the Labour Party, before completing her MSt in Women's Studies at the University of Oxford, for which she gained a Distinction. In 2025, she started her PhD in Philosophy at Royal Holloway, University of London, dedicated to reimagining the Relationships and Sex Education Curriculum in England through a feminist philosophical and legal lens.

Coryton then worked for HarperCollins when she wrote her book, before founding her social enterprise. She is also an ambassador for The Eve Appeal, a British charity that raises awareness of and funds research into gynaecological cancers.

== Stop Taxing Periods campaign ==
While a student at Goldsmiths, Coryton started the Stop Taxing Periods campaign in May 2014, centred around an online petition on website Change.org. By early 2016, the petition had gained more than 320,000 signatures and global recognition. Stop Taxing Periods also used protests, demonstration and viral social media.

In 2015, the campaign gained the support of the then Prime Minister David Cameron, who said: "I wish we could get rid of this… [but] there's a problem with getting rid of VAT on certain individual issues because of the way this tax is regulated and set in Europe." Change.org's UK director Brie Rogers cited Coryton as a successful example of clicktivism and the influence of online political activism on national politics.

In March 2016, Parliament accepted a Tampon Tax amendment proposed by Paula Sherriff MP, the then Chancellor George Osborne pledged in his budget to make menstrual products exempt from sales tax. VAT on sanitary products was abolished on 1 January 2021 in the UK.

== Sex Ed Matters ==
Coryton co-founded 'Sex Ed Matters', a Relationship and Sex Education social enterprise, in 2019. The organisation, which she runs with her twin sister Julia, is designed to help schools deliver sex education material, including period education, consent and LGBT rights, through the means of workshops and resources.

For her social enterprise, Coryton won Innovate UK's £12,000 Young Innovator Award in 2023 and its £50,000 Unlocking Potential Award] in 2024. She has also spoken about the importance of sex education in tackling incel culture and empowering young people at events including London Labour's Equalities Conference, Harvard University and the Women of the World Festival in London.

== Political candidacy ==
On 20 April 2024, Coryton was selectd as the Labour Party candidate for Richmond Park at the forthcoming general election.

Coryton finished in third place of seven candidates, with 5,048 votes (9.7%).
