= Coca-Cola Scholars Foundation =

US non-profit organization

Logo

The Coca-Cola Scholars Foundation (CCSF) is a non-profit organization that works on behalf and at the direction of the Coca-Cola system (including The Coca-Cola Company, the world's largest producer of non-alcoholic beverages, and its subsidiaries) to provide scholarships to some 1,400 students annually in amounts totaling over $3.4 million each year. The organization is based in Atlanta, Georgia.

== History ==
As Coca-Cola was approaching its centennial in 1986, leaders in the bottling industry decided to make a large financial gift that then became the Coca-Cola Scholars Program. In its first year, 150 graduating seniors planning on attending college were awarded four-year grants. Later, those grants grew into $20,000 scholarships for 50 students annually and $10,000 scholarships for another 200 students annually ($5,000/year for 4 years and $2,500/year for four years respectively).

Now, the Coca-Cola Scholars Foundation awards $20,000 grants to 150 rising college first-year students annually.

The Foundation launched in 2022 a program to train 7000 African women.

== Selection ==
Typically, the foundation receives between 85,000 and 110,000 applications, from which around 1,500 are selected as semifinalists. Regional representation across the United States is considered in this step.

The 1,500 semifinalists complete written applications from which approximately 250 regional finalists are selected. Regional finalists then complete interviews with prior recipients and CCSF staff, after which 150 Coca-Cola Scholars are selected.

Coca-Cola Scholars are invited to Atlanta for a Coca-Cola Scholars Weekend, where they participate in a leadership development institute, tour local landmarks, engage with Coca-Cola Scholar alumni, and participate in a group community service project. The scholars are also the guests of honor at the annual scholars banquet, where they are celebrated by representatives from the Coca-Cola system, educators, local dignitaries, and sponsors.

== Eligibility ==
To be eligible for a Coca-Cola Scholars Program scholarship, one must be a current high school or home-school senior planning to graduate from a school or program in the United States during the academic year in which application is made. Additionally, students must be U.S. citizens, U.S. nationals, U.S. permanent residents, temporary residents (legalization program), refugees, asylees, Cuban-Haitian entrants, or humanitarian parolees. Further, they must plan to pursue a degree at an accredited U.S. post-secondary institution and carry a minimum 3.00 GPA at the end of their junior year of high school. Applicants may not be children or grandchildren of employees, officers, or owners of Coca-Cola bottling companies, the Coca-Cola Company or any other bottler or company divisions or subsidiaries.

== Notable Coca-Cola Scholars ==
- Paula Broadwell, military scholar and author
- Charles B. Chang, Professor of Linguistics at City University of Hong Kong
- Ericka Dunlap, Miss America 2003
- Michael J. Freedman, Robert E. Kahn Professor of Computer Science at Princeton University
- Neha Gupta, founder of Empower Orphans and recipient of the International Children's Peace Prize
- Katori Hall, playwright, journalist, and actress
- Leila Janah, founder and CEO of Samasource and LXMI
- Mondaire Jones, U.S. Representative from New York
- Melissa Schettini Kearney, Neil Moskowitz Professor of Economics at the University of Maryland
- Kathryn Minshew, founder of The Muse website
- Cara Mund, Miss America 2018
- Alex B. Morse, mayor of Holyoke, Massachusetts
- Nadya Okamoto, social entrepreneur and activist
- Vivek Ramaswamy (2003), Republican presidential candidate
- Ben Sasse, U.S. Senator from Nebraska
- Katrina Shankland, Wisconsin state representative
- Elise Stefanik, U.S. Representative from New York
- Jake Sullivan, U.S. National Security Advisor
- Michael Tubbs, mayor of Stockton, California
- Michelle Wu, mayor of Boston
