= Charles B. Chang =

American linguist

- Education: Harvard University (BA); Trinity College, Cambridge (MPhil); University of California, Berkeley (PhD)
- Known for: Phonetic drift (linguistics); Advantageous language transfer
- Scientific career
- Fields: Linguistics; Phonetics; Phonology; Language acquisition Second-language acquisition Language attrition
- Workplaces: University of Maryland, College Park; Rice University; SOAS University of London; Boston University; City University of Hong Kong

Charles B. Chang is a professor in the Department of Linguistics and Translation at City University of Hong Kong. Chang is an editorial board member and former associate editor of the journal Second Language Research and a Life Member of the Linguistic Society of America.

== Biography ==
Selected as a Coca-Cola Scholar and a U.S. Presidential Scholar from New York in 1999, Chang completed his undergraduate education at Harvard University, graduating Phi Beta Kappa in 2003. He received an MPhil in English and applied linguistics from Trinity College, Cambridge, in 2006 and a PhD in linguistics from the University of California, Berkeley in 2010, writing a dissertation entitled "First language phonetic drift during second language acquisition."

Chang is the recipient of several grants, fellowships, and awards, including a Fulbright Program Fellowship, a Gates Cambridge Scholarship, and grants from the U.S. National Science Foundation, the U.S. National Institutes of Health, and the Hong Kong University Grants Committee. In 2016, he was awarded the Peter Paul Career Development Professorship at Boston University. In 2019, he was invited to the Distinguished Professors' Lectures Series at Adam Mickiewicz University in Poznań (Poland). In 2022, he was honored with the Early Career Award by the Linguistic Society of America "for contributions to the understanding of bilingual sound systems and cross-linguistic interactions, phonetic drift, and language learning over the lifespan, and to fostering diversity and inclusion within linguistics" and was named a Fellow of the Psychonomic Society. In 2023, he was awarded the inaugural Anne Cutler International Visiting Fellowship by Western Sydney University as well as a Humboldt Research Fellowship for Experienced Researchers by the Alexander von Humboldt Foundation. In 2026, he was named a Laureate of the Yuen Ren Chao Prize in Language Science by the Hong Kong Polytechnic University.

Prior to his appointment at City University of Hong Kong, Chang taught at the University of Maryland, College Park, Rice University, SOAS University of London, and Boston University. His research is in the areas of phonetics, phonology, language acquisition, and language attrition, with a focus on second-language acquisition and multilingualism in adulthood and heritage language speakers and learners. He is known for discovering changes to the native language sound system occurring at the beginning of second-language acquisition and, more generally, native language phonetic modifications due to recent second-language experience, which he termed phonetic drift. He is also known for documenting a "native-language transfer benefit" in second-language speech perception whereby non-native (bilingual) listeners outperform native listeners due to the influence of advantageous experience from their other language.

== Published works (selected) ==
- Chang, Charles B. (2012). Rapid and multifaceted effects of second-language learning on first-language speech production. Journal of Phonetics, 40, 249–268.
- Chang, Charles B. (2013). A novelty effect in phonetic drift of the native language. Journal of Phonetics, 41, 520–533.
- Chang, Charles B. (2016). Bilingual perceptual benefits of experience with a heritage language. Bilingualism: Language and Cognition, 19, 791–809.
- Chang, Charles B. (2019a). Language change and linguistic inquiry in a world of multicompetence: Sustained phonetic drift and its implications for behavioral linguistic research. Journal of Phonetics, 74, 96-113.
- Chang, Charles B. (2019b). Phonetic drift. In Monika S. Schmid and Barbara Köpke (Eds.), The Oxford handbook of language attrition, pp. 191–203. Oxford, UK: Oxford University Press.
- Chang, Charles B. and Alan Mishler. (2012). Evidence for language transfer leading to a perceptual advantage for non-native listeners. Journal of the Acoustical Society of America, 132, 2700–2710.
- Chang, Charles B. and Yao Yao. (2016). Toward an understanding of heritage prosody: Acoustic and perceptual properties of tone produced by heritage, native, and second language speakers of Mandarin. Heritage Language Journal, 13, 134–160.
- Chang, Charles B., Yao Yao, Erin F. Haynes, and Russell Rhodes. (2011). Production of phonetic and phonological contrast by heritage speakers of Mandarin. Journal of the Acoustical Society of America, 129, 3964–3980.
