= Nadya Okamoto =

American social entrepreneur (born 1998)

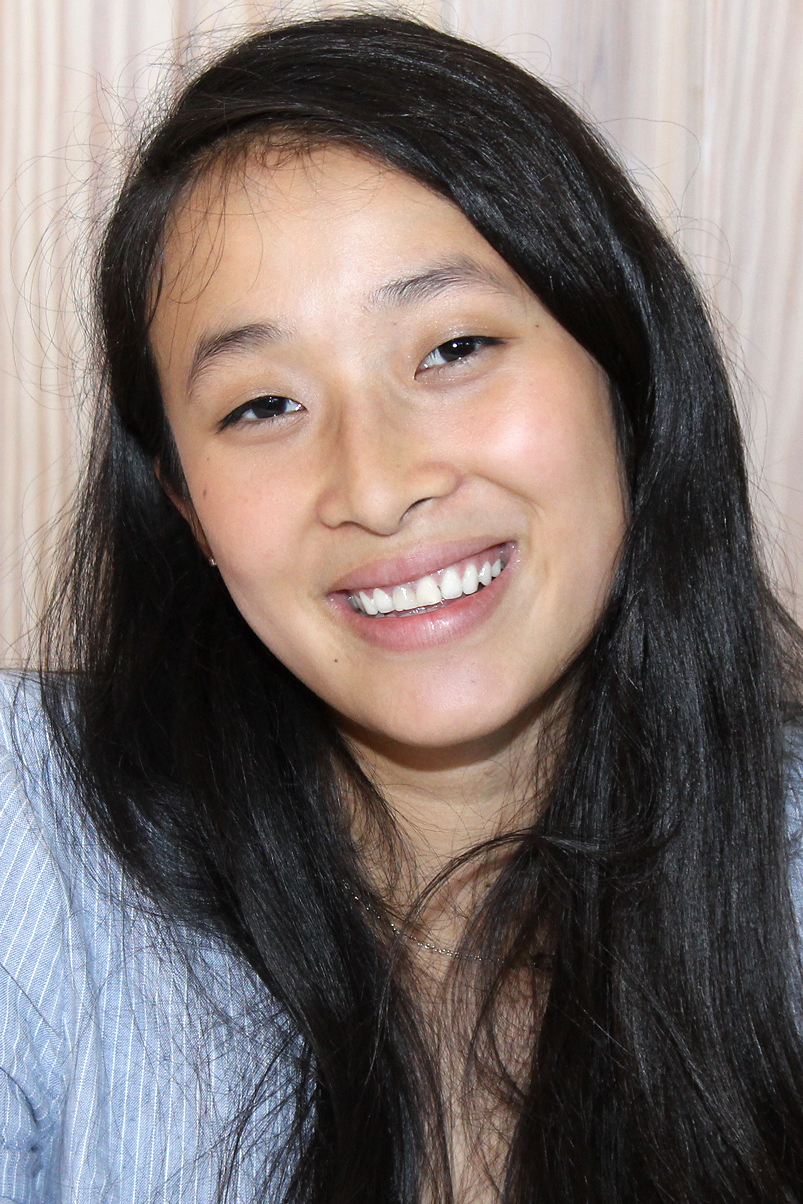
- Okamoto at the 2018 Texas Teen Book Festival
- Born: February 11, 1998 (age 28); New York City, U.S.
- Education: Harvard University (BA)
- Occupations: Entrepreneur, author
- Political party: Democratic
- Spouse: Henry Stevenson

Nadya Teresa Okamoto (born February 11, 1998) is an American social entrepreneur who is the founder and former executive director of the non-profit organization Period Inc., which distributes menstrual hygiene products and advocates for ending what is known as the tampon tax. In January 2020, Okamoto stepped down from Period Inc. as executive director; later that year, she left Period Inc. entirely after controversy over alleged misconduct.

In November 2020, Okamoto co-founded and was CEO of August, a for-profit, lifestyle period brand. The company also built Ask August, an educational "judgement-free platform" that "makes it easier for Generation Z to navigate the process of menstruation."

In 2017, Okamoto launched an unsuccessful bid for a seat on the Cambridge, Massachusetts City Council. Her debut book, Period Power: A Manifesto for the Menstrual Movement, was published in October 2018.

== Early life and education ==
Okamoto was born in New York City and moved to Portland, Oregon, at the age of nine. She is of Japanese and Taiwanese decent. Her mother is Sophia Tzeng, and her father is Shintaro Okamoto. Okamoto is no longer in contact with her father, and she has stated that she experienced sexual abuse and domestic violence from him in her childhood.

Okamoto attended the private K-12 school Catlin Gabel In December 2019, Catlin Gabel School published a report on the school's history of abuse by faculty towards students, wherein Okamoto's experience of harassment and grooming from her student advisor of four years was included. Okamoto came forward publicly with more details on her experience related to the abuse in January 2020. It was later revealed that her former student advisor was fired immediately after the inappropriate behavior was reported to the school. He publicly denied all allegations.

During her senior year of high school, Okamoto received the Gates Millennium Scholarship. Okamoto was also a 2016 Coca-Cola scholar. She received the first place 2016 Most Valuable Student Scholarship by the Elks National Foundation. In October 2019, Okamoto was given Catlin Gabel's Distinguished Alumni award.

Okamoto was accepted into early admission at Harvard College and graduated in June 2021.

== Career ==
In December 2014, Okamoto founded Period Inc. with her high school classmate Vincent Forand, originally under the name Camions of Care. The organization distributes menstrual hygiene products, has campus chapters at universities and high schools around the United States, and advocates for ending what is known as the tampon tax. Under her leadership as executive director, the organization registered 800 chapters in all 50 US states and 40 other countries. In 2017, Okamoto's organization hosted their first "Period Con," a global conference for young activists. In 2018, Period Inc. made $420,000 in annual revenue and in 2019 it was "the largest youth-run nongovernmental organization in women's health".

Okamoto moved to Cambridge, Massachusetts, in August 2016 to attend Harvard College. Less than seven months later, Okamoto announced her candidacy for Cambridge City Council, with a campaign team primarily composed of other Harvard students. She was the youngest candidate in the race and focused her campaign on issues of affordable housing, education equity, and climate change. Okamoto eventually lost the election, taking 15th place out of 26 candidates.

In October 2018, Okamoto published her debut book, Period Power: A Manifesto for the Menstrual Movement with publisher Simon & Schuster, which made the Kirkus Reviews list for Best Young Adult Nonfiction of 2018. In 2019, Okamoto was the Chief Brand Officer of Juv Consulting, a marketing firm that targets Gen Z.

In 2017, Okamoto was named as one of Teen Vogue's 21 Under 21. Okamoto was awarded the L'Oréal Women of Worth award at the annual Glamour Women of the Year ceremony in November 2019. In December 2019, Okamoto was named one of Forbes 30 Under 30 in law and policy and Bloomberg's 50 Most Influential Ones to Watch.

In January 2020, Okamoto stepped down from executive director of Period, Inc and moved into an advising role for the organization. In June 2020, activists accused Okamoto of monopolizing visibility and resources for her organization; Period Inc. confirmed that Okamoto was no longer working with the organization. Okamoto was also accused of exaggerating the extent of her experience with homelessness, as she had described herself as "legally homeless" during a period when her family was experiencing financial instability and living with friends. Period Inc. later released a report on the allegations that summarized the consequences of the organization's rapid growth and visibility, which noted that Okamoto was working with a transformative justice group on accountability.

In November 2020, Okamoto co-founded the lifestyle period brand August with Nick Jain, the founder of Juv Consulting. Okamoto is the CEO. In March 2021, August launched a free educational database called Ask August. August raised nearly $2 million for their seed round, led by venture capital firm Hannah Grey. The company sells direct-to-consumer period products and pays the tampon tax for customers in states where the tax is applied.

== Personal life ==
She is married to Henry Stevenson.
