= Ladies' night =

Type of promotional event

A ladies' night is a promotional event, often at a bar or nightclub, where female patrons pay less than male patrons for the cover charge or alcoholic beverages. In the United States, state courts in California, Maryland, Pennsylvania and Wisconsin have ruled that ladies' night discounts are unlawful gender-based price discrimination under state or local statutes. However, courts in Illinois, Minnesota, and Washington have rejected a variety of challenges to such discounts. The term Ladies Night, or Girls Night, is also used colloquially to mean any gathering of women in fellowship.

== Health concerns ==
Ladies' nights that promote discounts on alcoholic beverages may lead to increased binge drinking, which can be a safety and health hazard.

== Legality in the United States ==
=== Federal law ===
Claims against ladies' nights under the Equal Protection Clause of the Fourteenth Amendment to the United States Constitution have failed under the state action doctrine. Similar actions have failed under the Civil Rights Act of 1871 (42 U.S.C. § 1983). However, ladies' nights may have federal tax implications. Federal claims were also involved in the unsuccessful challenge in Washington (see below).

=== California ===
The California Supreme Court has ruled that ladies' days at a car wash and ladies' nights at a nightclub violate California's Unruh Civil Rights Act in Koire v Metro Car Wash (1985) and Angelucci v. Century Supper Club (2007). The Unruh Act provides: "All persons within the jurisdiction of this state are free and equal, and no matter what their sex [...] are entitled to the full and equal accommodations, advantages, facilities, privileges, or services in all business establishments of every kind whatsoever [...]." The court considered the statutory defense that the promotions serve "substantial business and social purposes", but concluded that merely being profitable is not a sufficient defense. The court accused the Wisconsin Supreme Court of "sexual stereotyping" for upholding a similar practice.

Koire held that: "Public policy in California strongly supports eradication of discrimination based on sex. The Unruh Act expressly prohibits sex discrimination by business enterprises." Koire concluded:

The legality of sex-based price discounts cannot depend on the subjective value judgments about which types of sex-based distinctions are important or harmful. The express language of the Unruh Act provides a clear and objective standard by which to determine the legality of the practices at issue. The Legislature has clearly stated that business establishments must provide "equal . . . advantages . . . [and] privileges" to all customers "no matter what their sex." (§ 51.) Strong public policy supports application of the Act in this case. The defendants have advanced no convincing argument that this court should carve out a judicial exception for their sex-based price discounts. The straightforward proscription of the Act should be respected.

Subsequent to the decision, California passed the Gender Tax Repeal Act of 1995, which specifically prohibits differential pricing based solely on a customer's gender. In Angelucci, the California Supreme Court ruled that discrimination victims did not have to ask the offending business to be treated equally in order to have standing to file an Unruh Act or Gender Tax Repeal Act claim.

Courts have not found violations on the Unruh Act with discounts for which any customer could theoretically qualify for. The California Supreme Court opined:

A multitude of promotional discounts come to mind which are clearly permissible under the Unruh Act. For example, a business establishment might offer reduced rates to all customers on one day each week. Or, a business might offer a discount to any customer who meets a condition which any patron could satisfy (e.g., presenting a coupon, or sporting a certain color shirt or a particular bumper sticker). In addition, nothing prevents a business from offering discounts for purchasing commodities in quantity, or for making advance reservations. The key is that the discounts must be “applicable alike to persons of every sex, color, race, [etc.]” ( § 51), instead of being contingent on some arbitrary, class-based generalization.

The Koire precedent has not been extended to strike down Mother's Day promotions. Koire was one of the precedents cited in the lower court (but not the state Supreme Court) in In re Marriage Cases

=== Illinois ===
Ladies' nights in Illinois have been upheld under the anti-discrimination provision of the Dram Shop Act. The court determined that the discount was intended to encourage women to attend the bar in greater numbers, rather than to discourage attendance by males.

=== Maryland ===
Montgomery County's human relations law has been interpreted to not only prohibit ladies' nights, but also a "Skirt and Gown Night" where a customer is given a 50% discount for wearing a skirt or gown. The court noted that: "Against this superficially humorous backdrop, we must decide whether this seemingly innocuous business practice constitutes unlawful discrimination within the meaning of a county ordinance." The Montgomery County Code, Human Relations Law, § 27-9, prohibited:

[...] any distinction with respect to any person based on race, color, sex, marital status, religious creed, ancestry, national origin, handicap, or sexual orientation in connection with admission to, service or sales in, or price, quality or use of any facility or service of any place of public accommodation, resort or amusement in the county.

The Maryland's appellate court's review was far from de novo and the court emphasized that:

Although we believe the judge's findings to be contradicted by American cultural realities, we need not focus on the circuit court's determination; our review is that of the agency's conclusion based upon facts presented at the hearing. The record is replete with evidence that Skirt and Gown Night was intended to-and did-have the same effect and serve the same function as Ladies' Night, i.e. it provided price discounts to women and, in fact, operated as a mere extension of Ladies' Night.

The court also stressed the peculiarity and strictness of the municipal ordinance it was interpreting:

We believe the ordinance is unambiguous. Thus, while allowed to do so under the Equal Protection Clause of the Fourteenth Amendment to the Constitution of the United States, we are not allowed under the Montgomery County Ordinance or the Maryland Constitution to engage in a balancing test.

=== Minnesota ===
Attempts by municipal governments to prevent ladies' nights have been struck down as ultra vires. In June 2010 the Minnesota Department of Human Rights said bars are discriminating against males by holding "ladies' night" promotions, but said it will not seek out bars that have a "ladies night."

=== Nevada ===
In 2008, the Nevada Equal Rights Commission ruled in favor of a man who claimed a local gym offering free memberships to women was discriminatory. The ruling is thought to have had wide ramifications for ladies' night promotions across the state.

Although the question has not been litigated in Nevada courts, two Nevada attorneys advise: "for the time being, businesses should exercise caution in utilizing gender-based pricing scheme promotions. While the ability of a plaintiff to succeed on such a claim in district court remains unknown, NERC has the ability to pursue such claims on the administrative level. Therefore, businesses should engage in a cost-benefit analysis, keeping in mind that they might have to spend time and resources defending a sex discrimination charge in front of NERC or elsewhere."

=== New Jersey ===
In 2004, the director of New Jersey Department of Law and Public Safety Division of Civil rights ruled that ladies' night promotions constituted unlawful discrimination in violation of the state's Law Against Discrimination.

=== New York ===
The New York State Human Rights Appeal Board disapproved of a New York Yankees "Ladies Day" promotion, which originated in 1876 as being "in a modern technological society where women and men are to be on equal footing as a matter of public policy."

=== Pennsylvania ===
Such promotions violate the Pennsylvania Human Relations Act as unlawful gender discrimination where male patrons are charged an entrance fee or a greater charge for drinks and female patrons are not charged an identical entrance fee or the same charge for drinks as male patrons. In Pennsylvania Liquor Control Board v. Dobrinoff, the Commonwealth Court specifically found that where a female patron was exempt from a cover charge, a go-go bar engaged in unlawful gender discrimination. The Pennsylvania Liquor Control Board has stated as recently as 2009 that it will issue citations against establishments which charge patrons differing amounts based on gender.

=== Washington ===
Ladies' nights have been found not to violate state anti-discrimination law, or the federal constitution, by the Washington Supreme Court, even if held at a stadium owned by a city. The Washington Supreme Court concluded that "the respondent has shown no discrimination against men as a class and no damage to himself. As a consequence he has no right of action under the state Law Against Discrimination. " In part, the court emphasized in its ruling evidence presented in the trial court that "women do not manifest the same interest in basketball that men do," and that the discount was only one of many discounts and promotions, the others available regardless of gender. Finally, the majority noted that "to decide important constitutional questions upon a complaint as sterile as this would be apt to erode public respect for the Equal Rights Amendment and deter rather than promote the serious goals for which it was adopted."

The dissenting justices emphasized their broader interpretation of the applicable prohibition and the potential for such promotions to reinforce stereotypes. One dissenting justice proposed that the complainant be allowed no damages, but only that the practice be enjoined. The dissent concluded:

It may be that application of the Equal Rights Amendment to the “promotional” activity of defendant is not the sort of thing the voters had in mind when they adopted HJR 61. Then again, an equally persuasive argument could be made that ticket price differentials based on sex were indeed one of a number of activities which they hoped to end. It is idle to speculate. No evidence of any kind exists. I see no escape from finding in this case that the plain language of Const. art. 31 proscribes the activity in which the defendants have engaged. Any further clarification of popular intent must come through the process of constitutional amendment, not by the imaginings of this court. Const. art. 23.

=== Wisconsin ===
The Wisconsin Supreme Court has held that such promotions violate the state's public accommodation law. The court noted that the text and legislative history of the statute permitted no distinction between sex, race, and other forms of discrimination.

== Legality in the United Kingdom ==
Although ladies' nights are prohibited by the Equality and Human Rights Commission in the United Kingdom as unlawful discrimination, some clubs reportedly flout the ban.

== Legality in Hong Kong ==
Ladies' nights were deemed unlawful by the Hong Kong District Court.

== See also ==
- International Women's Collaboration Brew Day
- List of public house topics
- Gender-based price discrimination in the United States
