= Gender-based price discrimination in the United States =

Gender-based price discrimination is a form of economic discrimination that involves price disparities for identical goods or services based on an individual's gender, and may reinforce negative stereotypes about both women and men in matching markets. Race and class-based price discrimination also exists. Acts of discrimination often have legal ramifications, but whether gendered price disparities prove an intent to discriminate or constitute illegal discrimination can become a legal inquiry. Policies against gender-based price discrimination is not universally approved and enforced in the United States. Gender-based price discrimination is also described as pink tax.

Gender-based price discrimination exists in many industries including insurance, dry cleaning, hairdressing, nightclubs, clothing, personal care products, discount prices and consumption taxes. A study by the New York City Department of Consumer and Worker Protection found that, on average, women's products cost seven percent more than similar products for men. The utilization of big data in business also apply to personalized price discrimination which involves the factor of a consumer's gender.

Whether gender-based pricing is a form of discrimination, and whether it is illegal has been of a debate in the United States and European Union since the 1990s. Opponents of the enforcement of laws against gender-based pricing make two arguments. Firstly, they suggest that courts should dismiss cases involving gender-based pricing because the injury to the plaintiff is so inconsequential that they should not be entitled to relief. Secondly, they point to economic efficiency as a justification. In response to the economic efficiency argument, scholars suggest that gender-based pricing should be prohibited on moral grounds, stating that gender should not be used as a proxy for other characteristics, especially when based on stereotypes.

== Gendered price disparities ==
Gender research has heavily focused on the interaction between gender and the economy. Typically, research in this area involves the issue of the gender pay gap. Another aspect of gender research in economics is the less studied issue of gender-based price disparities in the cost of goods and services across different industries. Scholars suggest that the existence of gendered price disparities contribute to gender inequality by creating an economic burden that does not exist for the other gender and by reinforcing gender roles in the marketplace.

=== Personal care industry ===
There are a number of different studies on the price disparities between personal care products and services that are marketed towards females and males. For example, the New York City Department of Consumer and Worker Protection (DCA) conducted a study of prices of goods in New York City across five industries, including personal care products. Other universities and academics have also studied the prices in personal care products and services. However, it is also argued that if there is no barrier or prohibition to the consumer buying the cheaper product, the consumer must find added value in the more expensive product and thus there is no real discrimination.

==== Personal care services ====
While studies have shown significant price disparities in personal care products between men and women, gendered price disparities across personal care services has been inconsistent. A recent study titled Cost of Doing Femininity examined two areas of personal care services that had directly comparable prices between men and women: hair salons and dry cleaners. The study found that only 15 out of 100 randomly selected hair salons had the same prices for both men and women, and none of the salons charged women less than men. Dry cleaning prices depended on the type and amount of fabric, with more embellishments corresponding with higher prices. This price factor, however, tended to negatively impact women more often than men because women's garments are more likely to be embroidered or be made of delicate fabric.

==== Personal care products ====
Gendered price disparities in personal care products are more apparent than in personal care services and across other industries. By and large, the price disparities in personal care products are notably higher than in other industries and cost women around 13 percent more than men. This disparity is especially significant considering women purchase these products more regularly than men. Prices for hair products, followed by razors, cost the most for women - typically costing women almost 50 percent more than men.

=== Hair care industry ===
Price disparities in hair salon services between men and women are thought to be justifiable because women's hair is often longer and more complicated to maintain and cut. In recent years, however, this stereotype has changed. Men are often experimenting with their hair, including hair loss treatment and hair color. While women may still spend a considerable amount for hair color and other treatments, many women prefer basic haircuts. Additionally, salon-quality hair styling tools are readily available and easy to use at home.

Gendered price disparities for hair salon services have also been documented in different locations across the United States and Europe. The California Assembly Office of Research conducted a survey of five large California cities and found that forty percent of the hair salons charged women, on average, five dollars more than men for a standard haircut. Gendered price disparities in haircut prices also has been found in New York City: Of 199 hair salons examined, nearly 48 percent of hair-cutters charged women more than men for a simple haircut.

=== Vehicle insurance ===
The price disparities between men and women in the vehicle insurance market is one of the few instances where men typically pay more than women for identical products and services, however, men start paying less than women as age increases. Unlike in the markets for retail or personal care products, however, these gender-based price differences can be rationally explained. Because men are believed in general to behave in more risky behaviors than women (driving at excessive speeds, driving recklessly, driving under the influence of drugs and/or alcohol, etc.), the cost of insuring men is greater than the cost of insuring women, and this cost difference is reflected in insurance rates calculated in part on the gender of the insured.

Despite vehicle insurance typically costing men more, there is some research to suggest that women actually pay more under the fixed annual pricing system because men drive more miles and are involved in twice as many accidents.

=== Car price negotiations ===
For most Americans, new car purchases are their largest consumer investment after buying a home. In 1991, Harvard Law Professor Ian Ayres examined whether the process of negotiating for a new car disadvantaged women and minorities. The study was conducted in the Chicago area and involved 180 price negotiations at 90 dealerships. The study's testers included individuals of different races and genders and each was instructed to use the same negotiation strategy. Each tester entered a car dealership and bargained to purchase a new car. The results of the study concluded that white males received significantly better prices than non-whites and women.

=== Health insurance ===
It is argued women tend to pay more than men for health insurance. One explanation for this is that women make more use of the health care services made available to them by their insurance.

A detailed survey of medical costs of the period 1999 to 2016 by the U.S. Department of Health and Human Services shows spending on healthcare for women is higher than for men. According to their study, during the ages of 18 to 44, health spending for females is 84% higher than men. Even when removing the cost of childbirth, spending for women ages 44 to 64 was still 24% higher than for men. Spending for women ages 65+ is 8% higher. Adjusting for the cost of treatment due to injuries sustained while in the military makes the disparity greater still.

Nevertheless, the Affordable Care Act made gender-based differences in premium prices illegal.

=== Discount prices ===
Discount prices is also a type of gender-based price discrimination that segmenting customers based on the factor of gender. A common gender-based price discount is a "ladies' night" promotion, in which female patrons pay less for alcoholic drinks or a lower cover charge than male patrons do.

=== Consumption taxes ===
Consumption taxes on certain products but not others have also been viewed a form of gender-based price disparity. For example, in the United States, feminine hygiene products such as menstrual pads and tampons are often subjected to a consumption tax, while related products such as condoms, lubricant, and several other medical items are exempt from the tax.

Entertainment

Entertainment event are typically charged differently across genders.

This behavior is rarely advertised, except in venues, like night clubs, where women are typically charged less or nothing for access to such venues. This is often advertised as “ladies night”.

== Law and policy ==
The Supreme Court of the United States has not enunciated a workable evidentiary standard to govern claims of subtle and unconscious forms of discrimination. Further, there is no general federal law explicitly prohibiting gender-based price discrimination. Because many pricing decisions are made by private businesses, the 14th Amendment generally does not apply, and sex was not included as a protected class under federal public accommodation law. As a result, these issues tend to be left to the states.

In recent years, an increasing number of states and localities have enacted laws and policies prohibiting gender-based price discrimination in public accommodations, such as nightclubs and bars. For example, courts in California, Florida, Pennsylvania, Iowa, and Maryland have consistently ruled against gender-based pricing. However, other states such as Illinois, Washington, and Michigan, have adopted a case-by-case approach on the issue.

=== California ===
California passed the Unruh Civil Rights Act in 1959, making California the first state to enact legislation to protect against gender-based price discrimination. California Assemblywoman Jackie Speier introduced the Gender Tax Repeal Act to "try to address the persistent problem of gender-based discrimination in the sale of services related to haircuts, laundry, dry cleaning, and alterations." The law was enacted to prohibit businesses from charging different prices for services based on a customer's gender. (Note: "According to the California Assembly's Office of Research's study, 64 percent of dry cleaners in five metropolitan areas charged women more than men to launder an identical article of clothing, and 40 percent of hair salons charged women more for basic haircuts.") The Gender Tax Repeal Act provided for civil actions in which courts may award a minimum of $1,000 or up to three times the amount of actual damages in addition to attorney's fees. The enactment of the Gender Tax Repeal Act aided in combating gender-based price discrimination in the pricing of services, but did not prohibit such price differentials with respect to products.

On January 21, 2016, California State Senator Ben Hueso introduced Senate Bill 899 to extend prohibiting gender-based price discrimination from services to products. Senate Bill 899 proposed to prohibit businesses from price discriminating with respect to goods of "similar or like kind" based on a customer's gender. On March 31, 2016, Senator Hueso introduced amendments clarifying that businesses may charge more for a product if there are legitimate differences in costs of labor, materials, or tariffs. The amendments also clarified that "substantially similar" products included products of the same brand, share the same functional components, and share 90 percent of the same materials and ingredients. Senate Bill 899, sponsored by Consumer Federation of California, received support from the American Civil Liberties Union of California, California Public Interest Research Group, Planned Parenthood Affiliates of California, and Women's Foundation of California. On April 12, 2016, the Senate Judiciary Committee voted 5–1 in favor of Senate Bill 899 and will advance the bill with a Senate Hearing.

=== Miami-Dade County, Florida ===
In 1997, Miami-Dade County in Florida passed an ordinance prohibiting businesses from charging different prices for products or services based solely on the customer's gender. However, businesses are permitted to charge a different price for products or services that involve more time, difficulty, or cost. (Note: "Nothing in this section prohibits bona fide discount programs based on gender classifications so long as such programs are not designed, intended or used to deny any individual or group access to the premises or the right to patronize the premises and such program is for a limited period of time.") Miami-Dade County's ordinance also permits limited discount programs based on gender. For instance, a business may advertise "Ladies Free on Friday Night", as long as men are not prevented from patronizing the business.
