= Period Products (Free Provision) Act (Northern Ireland) 2022 =

- Act of the Northern Ireland Assembly
- Northern Ireland Assembly
- Long title: An Act to secure the provision throughout Northern Ireland of free period products; and for connected purposes.
- Citation: 2022 c. 25 (N.I.)
- Introduced by: Pat Catney
- Territorial extent: Northern Ireland

Dates
- Royal assent: 12 May 2022
- Commencement: 22 June 2023; 15 April 2024

Status: Current legislation

Text of statute as originally enacted

Revised text of statute as amended

Text of the Period Products (Free Provision) Act (Northern Ireland) 2022 as in force today (including any amendments) within the United Kingdom, from legislation.gov.uk.

The Period Products (Free Provision) Act (Northern Ireland) 2022 (c. 25 (N.I.)) received royal assent on 12 May 2022. It requires all public bodies to provide provision of free period products.

== History ==
In 2021, the Scottish Parliament passed the Period Products (Free Provision) (Scotland) Act 2021. Following that, the assembly passed Pat Catney's private members' bill in the Northern Ireland Assembly to provide similar provision in the Northern Ireland.

Period product became available free of charge on 13 May 2024.

In May 2023, the money allocated to providing free period products was cut by 40% due to funding cuts in the budget from the Northern Ireland Office.

== See also ==
- Period Products (Free Provision) (Scotland) Act 2021
