= Cover charge =

Type of entrance fee

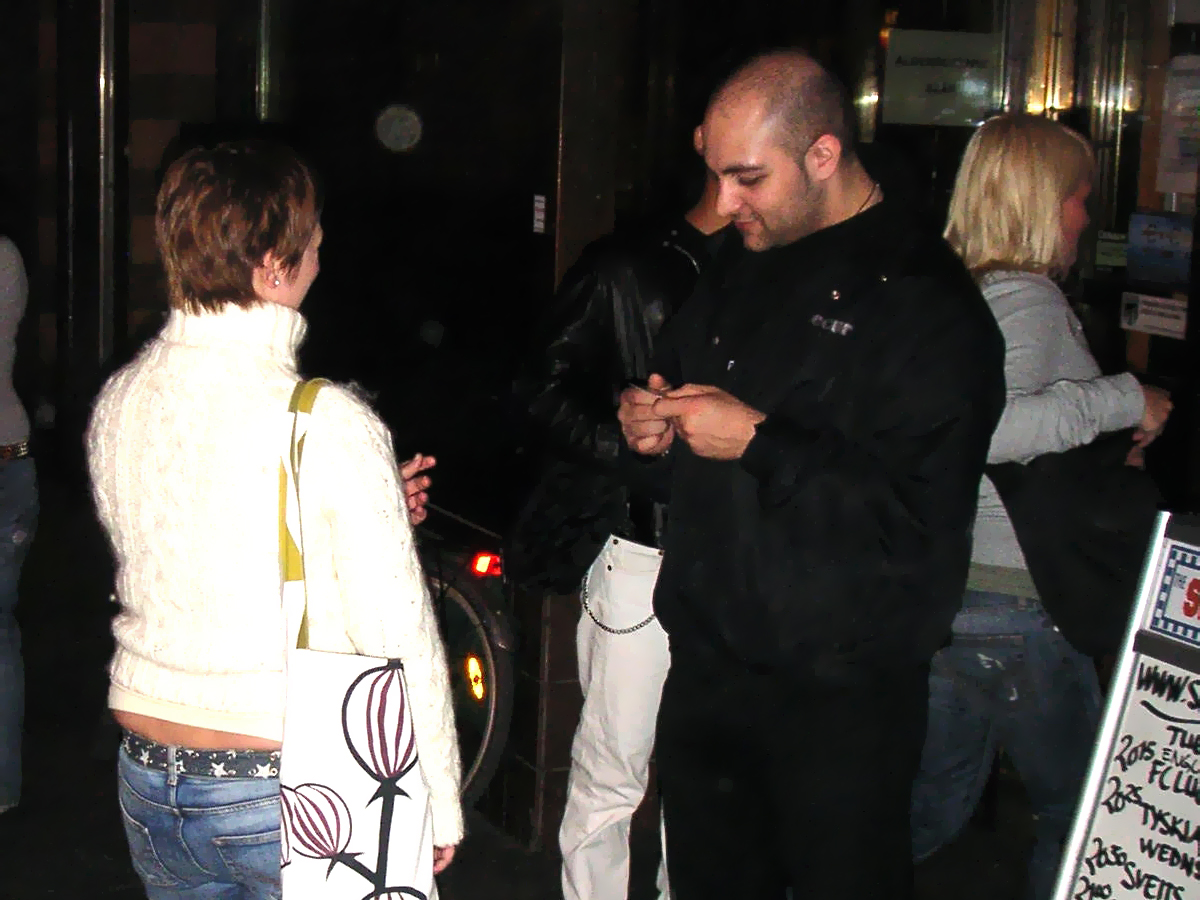
Club bouncers are sometimes responsible for collecting a cover charge.

A cover charge is an entrance fee sometimes charged at bars, nightclubs, or restaurants. It is collected upon entry or as an additional charge on the bill.

In restaurants, cover charges generally do not include the cost of food that is specifically ordered. In some establishments, they do include the cost of bread, butter, olives and other accompaniments, though the charge is payable whether or not they are eaten.

== Etymology ==
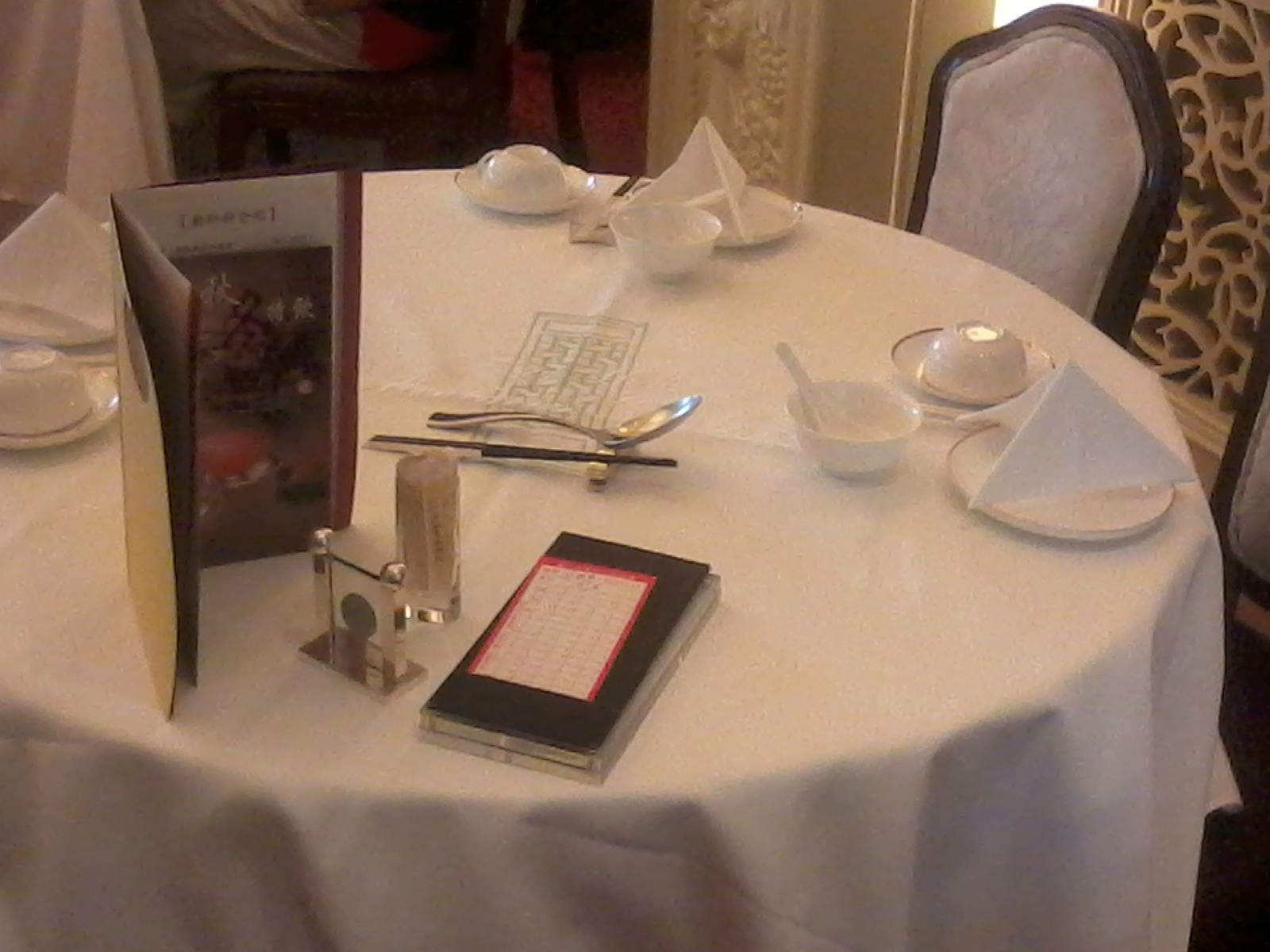
When a group of people sits at a table in a diner, several types of restaurants will charge an additional fee even for a guest who does not order any food; this charge is for the service of setting out the tablecloth, napkin, and cutlery.

A place-setting at a restaurant may be referred to as a "cover."

Restaurants in English-speaking countries sometimes have a menu in French; in these and other restaurants the cover charge is sometimes described with the French word "couvert". This term and the related charge, originating in France, has been used with this meaning in English since at least 1899. The French word both means table setting and is the past participle of couvrir, "to cover"; couvert or "cover" in the sense of place-setting derived from the French past participle according to the OED: "Cover (7): After French couvert, (1) ‘the covering or furniture of a Table for the meale of a prince’ (Cotgrave), the cloth, plates, knives, forks, etc. with which a table is covered or laid; (2) the portion of these appropriated to each guest".

== History ==
The couvert or cover charge has been levied for many years, certainly in English-speaking countries by 1899. In the US, the cover charge later became an entry charge where both entertainment and food and drink are provided, and carries the expectation of entertainment. The first such cover charge was introduced in 1913 by Louis Fischer at Reisenweber's Cafe in Manhattan, to cover the production costs of Ned Wayburn's revues held there.

== Business considerations ==
=== Entrance charges ===
In some cases, popular bars and clubs have a substantial excess demand; patrons are lined up outside the club waiting to get in. In this case, the club can gain additional revenue from customers by requiring an entrance charge.

=== Live events ===
Some bars and clubs use cover charges only on nights when there is live entertainment or a DJ, to cover the costs of hiring the performers. Cover charges may be lower for lesser-known, often local, bands or entertainers than for better-known touring bands. Some expensive clubs have both a cover charge and a minimum drink requirement.

Many sports bars have a cover charge when they are showing a boxing or a UFC pay per view event, to help defray to costs of ordering the pay-per-view material.

=== Price discrimination ===
Bars and clubs may lower or waive cover charges for some categories, such as:

- College or university students with student identification
- Members of the club or of nightclub organizations or associations
- Early arrivals (before 11 p.m. or midnight)
- People who order food
- If the club is in a hotel, for hotel guests
- Some bars customarily or occasionally waive the cover charge for women in hopes that doing so will increase their number of female customers and thereby attract male customers as well.
- The bar usually allows the band or performers to provide a list of guests who will be admitted without paying the cover charge ("the guest list")
- Regular customers who usually purchase a large number of drinks.
- Bouncers sometimes waive the cover charge for their friends; without prior approval, this can be considered illegal.

Conversely, some bars may have higher cover charges for minors, who may not purchase or drink alcohol.

=== Revenue-sharing with performers ===
Bars and clubs have different policies for how the cover charge is shared, if at all, with the performers. Different revenue-sharing agreements are often negotiated by different performers. The range of revenue-sharing arrangements range from the band or performers retaining all of the money collected for the cover charge, to a split between the bar and the band, to arrangements where the bar retains all of the cover charge. A variant of these revenue-sharing arrangements occurs in cases where the bar also gives the band a share of the bar's alcohol sales receipts. Some bars may also agree to a guarantee, in which the bar promises to pay the band a certain amount even if this is less than the amount collected at the door.

=== Luxury cover charges ===
Luxury clubs with unusual architecture and interior design and a unique atmosphere sometimes have cover charges even when there is no live entertainment or DJ. In these cases, the cover charge simply contributes to the club's revenues. For example, in 2005, Mike Viscuso's On Broadway, a glam-disco dining palace, had a cover charge of $15. Also in 2005, James Brennan's Stingaree, a glam restaurant and club/lounge, had a cover charge of $20.

Some high-end and luxury bars and nightclubs have yearly membership fees which can be interpreted as annual cover charges. For example, Frederick's has a $1,200 a year membership, the Keating Lounge has a $2,500 annual membership fee, and The Core Club has a $60,000 membership fee. A variant of these annual fees are "table charges" at some elite nightclubs, in which a customer agrees to spend a minimum amount in order to reserve a table in the club (e.g., $1,000 in the evening).

== Legal restrictions ==
According to Massachusetts law, subject to a penalty of up to $50, no cafe, restaurant, or bar can require payment of a minimum or cover charge unless a sign is conspicuously posted with at least one-inch-high letters, stating that a minimum charge or cover charge shall be charged and indicating the amount. Children under thirteen may not be charged. This law was put in place to resolve the problem of "secret" cover charges, which are indicated only in tiny text on the menu. Clubgoers would then find this cover charge added to their first drink order. In Illinois, bars cannot impose a cover charge unless the fee goes toward the cost of off-setting entertainment costs such as a live band.

Pane e coperto, a "bread and cover" charge, is nearly ubiquitous in Italy. In 1995, the Italian regional government in Lazio (which includes Rome) began requiring restaurants in the region to remove the charge for Pane e coperto from their bills. In 1998, the European Union ruled that the regional law was invalid, but the region is continuing to try to abolish the practice.

=== Ladies' nights in the United States ===
To attract more female customers, bars often have a "no cover for women" policy, sometimes on a ladies' night. In some cases these policies have been challenged in lawsuits as discriminatory, and are illegal in some jurisdictions in the United States.

A ladies' night is a promotional event, often at a bar or nightclub, where female patrons pay less than male patrons for the cover charge or drinks. State courts in California, Maryland, Pennsylvania and Wisconsin have ruled that ladies' night discounts are unlawful gender discrimination under state or local statutes. However, courts in Illinois, Minnesota, and Washington have rejected a variety of challenges to such discounts.

Claims against ladies' nights under the Equal Protection Clause of the Fourteenth Amendment to the United States Constitution have failed under the state action doctrine. Similar actions have failed under the Civil Rights Act of 1871 (42 U.S.C. § 1983). Ladies nights may have federal tax implications, though. Federal claims were also involved in the unsuccessful challenge in Washington (see below).

==== California ====
The California Supreme Court has ruled that ladies' days at a car wash and ladies' nights at a nightclub violate California's Unruh Civil Rights Act in Koire v Metro Car Wash (1985) and Angelucci v. Century Supper Club (2007). The Unruh Act provides: "All persons within the jurisdiction of this state are free and equal, and no matter what their sex [...] are entitled to the full and equal accommodations, advantages, facilities, privileges, or services in all business establishments of every kind whatsoever [...]." The court considered the statutory defense that the promotions serve "substantial business and social purposes", but concluded that merely being profitable is not a sufficient defense. The court accused the Wisconsin Supreme Court of "sexual stereotyping" for upholding a similar practice.

Koire held that: "Public policy in California strongly supports eradication of discrimination based on sex. The Unruh Act expressly prohibits sex discrimination by business enterprises." Koire concluded:

The legality of sex-based price discounts cannot depend on the subjective value judgments about which types of sex-based distinctions are important or harmful. The express language of the Unruh Act provides a clear and objective standard by which to determine the legality of the practices at issue. The Legislature has clearly stated that business establishments must provide "equal . . . advantages . . . [and] privileges" to all customers "no matter what their sex." (§ 51.) Strong public policy supports application of the Act in this case. The defendants have advanced no convincing argument that this court should carve out a judicial exception for their sex-based price discounts. The straightforward proscription of the Act should be respected.

Subsequent to the decision, California passed the Gender Tax Repeal Act of 1995, which specifically prohibits differential pricing based solely on a customer's gender. In Angelucci, the California Supreme Court ruled that discrimination victims did not have to ask the offending business to be treated equally in order to have standing to file an Unruh Act or Gender Tax Repeal Act claim.

Courts have not found violations on the Unruh Act with discounts for which any customer could theoretically qualify for. The California Supreme Court opined:

A multitude of promotional discounts come to mind which are clearly permissible under the Unruh Act. For example, a business establishment might offer reduced rates to all customers on one day each week. Or, a business might offer a discount to any customer who meets a condition which any patron could satisfy (e.g., presenting a coupon, or sporting a certain color shirt or a particular bumper sticker). In addition, nothing prevents a business from offering discounts for purchasing commodities in quantity, or for making advance reservations. The key is that the discounts must be "applicable alike to persons of every sex, color, race, [etc.]" ( § 51), instead of being contingent on some arbitrary, class-based generalization.

The Koire precedent has not been extended to strike down Mother's Day promotions. Koire was one of the precedents cited in the lower court (but not the state Supreme Court) in In re Marriage Cases which was overturned by California Proposition 8 (2008).

==== Illinois ====
Ladies' nights in Illinois have been upheld under the anti-discrimination provision of the Dram Shop Act. The court determined that the discount was intended to encourage women to attend the bar in greater numbers, rather than to discourage attendance by males.

==== Maryland ====
Montgomery County's human relations law has been interpreted to not only prohibit ladies' nights, but also a "Skirt and Gown Night" where a customer is given a 50% discount for wearing a skirt or gown. The court noted that: "Against this superficially humorous backdrop, we must decide whether this seemingly innocuous business practice constitutes unlawful discrimination within the meaning of a county ordinance." The Montgomery County Code, Human Relations Law, § 27-9, prohibited:

any distinction with respect to any person based on race, color, sex, marital status, religious creed, ancestry, national origin, handicap, or sexual orientation in connection with admission to, service or sales in, or price, quality or use of any facility or service of any place of public accommodation, resort or amusement in the county.

The Maryland appellate court's review was far from de novo and the court emphasized that:

Although we believe the judge's findings to be contradicted by American cultural realities, we need not focus on the circuit court's determination; our review is that of the agency's conclusion based upon facts presented at the hearing. The record is replete with evidence that Skirt and Gown Night was intended to-and did-have the same effect and serve the same function as Ladies' Night, i.e. it provided price discounts to women and, in fact, operated as a mere extension of Ladies' Night."

The court also stressed the peculiarity and strictness of the municipal ordinance it was interpreting:

We believe the ordinance is unambiguous. Thus, while allowed to do so under the Equal Protection Clause of the Fourteenth Amendment to the Constitution of the United States, we are not allowed under the Montgomery County Ordinance or the Maryland Constitution to engage in a balancing test.

==== Minnesota ====
Attempts by municipal governments to prevent ladies' nights have been struck down as ultra vires. In June 2010 the Minnesota Department of Human Rights said bars are discriminating against males by holding "ladies' night" promotions, but said it will not seek out bars that have a "ladies night."

==== Nevada ====
Although this question has not been litigated in Nevada, two Nevada attorneys advise:

for the time being, businesses should exercise caution in utilizing gender-based pricing scheme promotions. While the ability of a plaintiff to succeed on such a claim in district court remains unknown, NERC has the ability to pursue such claims on the administrative level. Therefore, businesses should engage in a cost-benefit analysis, keeping in mind that they might have to spend time and resources defending a sex discrimination charge in front of NERC or elsewhere.

==== New York ====
The New York State Human Rights Appeal Board disapproved of a New York Yankees "Ladies Day" promotion, which originated in 1876 as being "in a modern technological society where women and men are to be on equal footing as a matter of public policy."

==== Pennsylvania ====
Such promotions violate the Pennsylvania Human Relations Act as unlawful gender discrimination where male patrons are charged an entrance fee or a greater charge for drinks and female patrons are not charged an identical entrance fee or the same charge for drinks as male patrons. In Pennsylvania Liquor Control Board v. Dobrinoff, the Commonwealth Court specifically found that where a female patron was exempt from a cover charge, a go-go bar engaged in unlawful gender discrimination. The Pennsylvania Liquor Control Board has stated as recently as 2009 that it will issue citations against establishments which charge patrons differing amounts based on gender.

==== Washington ====
Ladies' nights have been found not to violate state anti-discrimination law, or the federal constitution, by the Washington Supreme Court, even if held at a stadium owned by a city. The Washington Supreme Court concluded that "the respondent has shown no discrimination against men as a class and no damage to himself. As a consequence he has no right of action under the state Law Against Discrimination. " In part, the court emphasized in its ruling evidence presented in the trial court that "women do not manifest the same interest in basketball that men do," and that the discount was only one of many discounts and promotions, the others available regardless of gender. Finally, the majority noted that "to decide important constitutional questions upon a complaint as sterile as this would be apt to erode public respect for the Equal Rights Amendment and deter rather than promote the serious goals for which it was adopted."

The dissenting justices emphasized their broader interpretation of the applicable prohibition and the potential for such promotions to reinforce stereotypes. One dissenting justice proposed that the complainant be allowed no damages, but only that the practice be enjoined. The dissent concluded:

It may be that application of the Equal Rights Amendment to the "promotional" activity of defendant is not the sort of thing the voters had in mind when they adopted HJR 61. Then again, an equally persuasive argument could be made that ticket price differentials based on sex were indeed one of a number of activities which they hoped to end. It is idle to speculate. No evidence of any kind exists. I see no escape from finding in this case that the plain language of Const. art. 31 proscribes the activity in which the defendants have engaged. Any further clarification of popular intent must come through the process of constitutional amendment, not by the imaginings of this court. Const. art. 23.

==== Wisconsin ====
The Wisconsin Supreme Court has held that such promotions violate the state's public accommodation law. The court noted that the text and legislative history of the statute permitted no distinction between sex, race, and other forms of discrimination.

Some comedy clubs and strip bars may allow patrons to enter without paying a fee, with the implicit or explicit expectation that the customers will buy alcoholic beverages while inside. Some bars with "no cover charge" policies may have higher prices for their snacks and beer to make up for the lack of a cover charge. Many nightclubs oriented towards electronic dance music have a cover charge, in some cases because many of their patrons are not drinking alcohol due to use of other drugs such as MDMA. Bottles of water are also often priced at up to $10 to offset the loss of revenue from reduced sales of alcohol.
