= Period Products (Free Provision) (Scotland) Act 2021 =

- Act of the Scottish Parliament
- Scottish Parliament
- Long title: An Act of the Scottish Parliament to secure the provision throughout Scotland of free period products.
- Citation: 2021 asp 1
- Introduced by: Monica Lennon
- Territorial extent: Scotland

Dates
- Royal assent: 12 January 2021
- Commencement: 18 March 2021; 15 August 2022

Status: Current legislation

Text of statute as originally enacted

Text of the Period Products (Free Provision) (Scotland) Act 2021 as in force today (including any amendments) within the United Kingdom, from legislation.gov.uk.

The Period Products (Free Provision) (Scotland) Act 2021 (asp 1) was a private member's bill in the Scottish Parliament which received royal assent on 12 January 2021. It is the world's first legislation to make it mandatory for all public institutions to provide free sanitary products for menstruation including tampons and pads.

The act followed a campaign coordinated by Monica Lennon, MSP, the Spokesperson on Health for the Scottish Labour Party, and obtained all-party support in the Scottish Parliament. The provision will cost an estimated £8.7 million annually.

== History ==
In 2017, Nicola Sturgeon, then-First Minister of Scotland had announced that period products would be free in Scottish schools. It has been noted that other public buildings had followed the lead by offering free products or free with an "honesty box". The Scottish Government had originally proposed that free products should be available on a means-tested basis, but changed its proposals in February given the wide support in the Scottish Parliament.

Similar schemes for schools have been promised for Ireland in 2020.

The legislation came into force on 15 August 2022, making Scotland the first country to make such a provision.

In 2022, the Northern Ireland Assembly passed the similar Period Products (Free Provision) Act (Northern Ireland) 2022.

== See also ==
- Period Products (Free Provision) Act (Northern Ireland) 2022
