= San Francisco 2004 same-sex weddings =

Political event in the United States

The San Francisco 2004 same-sex weddings, commonly referred to as the Winter of Love, took place between February 12 and March 11, 2004, after San Francisco Mayor Gavin Newsom directed the city-county clerk to issue marriage licenses to same-sex couples. California Attorney General Bill Lockyer and a number of interest groups sued to end the practice. About 4,000 such licenses were issued before the California Supreme Court ordered a halt to the practice on March 11. On August 12, 2004, the California Supreme Court voided all of the licenses that had been issued in February and March.

The legal dispute over the issuance of marriage licenses to same-sex couples led to the 2008 In re Marriage Cases ruling by the California Supreme Court, which legalized same-sex marriage in California.

== Background ==
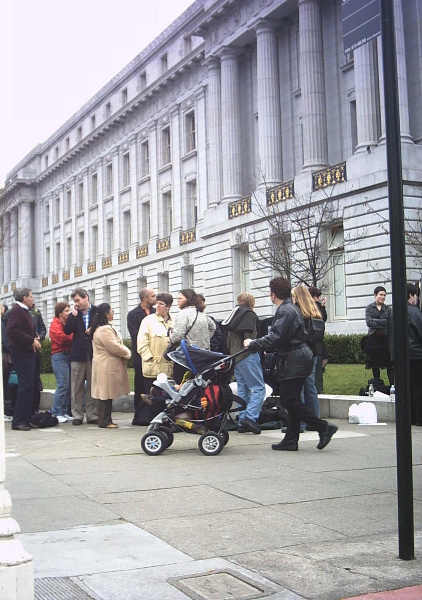
The line of same-sex couples applying for marriage licenses stretched for blocks around San Francisco's City Hall in February 2004.

In the 2004 State of the Union Address, President George W. Bush spoke against "activist judges [...] redefining marriage by court order;" this was interpreted as a response to the Massachusetts Supreme Judicial Court's 2003 ruling legalizing same-sex marriage in the state. San Francisco Mayor Gavin Newsom, who attended the State of the Union Address as a guest of Representative Nancy Pelosi, reportedly called his chief of staff the night after the speech to start making plans.

On February 12, 2004, Newsom and other city officials began issuing marriage licenses to same-sex couples. Newsom asserted that the Constitution of California's equal protection clause gave him the authority to do so. The first same-sex couple to be issued a license were lesbian activists Del Martin and Phyllis Lyon. After three days, city officials estimated that they had already issued 900 same-sex marriage certificates.

On February 13, two organizations, the Proposition 22 Legal Defense and Education Fund, and the Campaign for California Families, filed actions in San Francisco Superior Court seeking an immediate stay to prohibit the City from issuing marriage licenses to same-sex couples. The court refused to issue an immediate stay on February 20.

On February 19, while defending its issuance of licenses in one court, the city initiated its own lawsuit against the state. It charged that the state statute defining marriage violated the state constitution by excluding same-sex couples.

On February 20, 2004, California Governor Arnold Schwarzenegger ordered state Attorney General Bill Lockyer to "obtain a definitive judicial resolution" of the controversy. Speaking that same day at the state Republican convention, Schwarzenegger said:

During my campaign, I talked about the importance of rule of law. We rely upon our courts to enforce our rule of law, but we're seeing in San Francisco that the courts are dropping the ball.... While we wait for the courts to act, it's time for the City of San Francisco to start respecting state law. It is time for the city to stop traveling down this dangerous path of ignoring the rule of law.

Lockyer responded by acknowledging his office had to defend state law "and allow the courts to determine whether the city has acted illegally", but said his political beliefs were sympathetic to issuing the licenses:

As a lifelong defender of civil rights, due process and equal protection for all, I do not personally support policies that give lesser legal rights and responsibilities to committed same-sex couples than those provided to heterosexual couples. That is why I have and continue to strongly support extending the benefits and responsibilities of marriage to same-sex couples through domestic partnerships and civil union statutes.

The Attorney General and a group of taxpayers filed separate petitions in February 2004 asking the California Supreme Court to issue an original writ of mandate. They asserted that the city's actions were unlawful and warranted the court's immediate intervention.

On March 9, the San Jose City Council, by a vote of 8-1, agreed to recognize any same-sex marriages of its employees performed in other jurisdictions.

On March 11, the Supreme Court of California issued a stay ordering the County of San Francisco "to enforce the existing marriage statutes and to refrain from issuing marriage licenses not authorized by such provisions" pending further review by the court. Mayor Newsom agreed to abide by the order.

== Legal proceedings ==
The Supreme Court's ruling did not alter a scheduled March 29 San Francisco Superior Court hearing before Judge Ronald Quidachay in which the Campaign for California Families and the Alliance Defense Fund claimed that San Francisco's granting of same-sex marriage licenses was illegal. Quidachay later delayed the hearing pending state Supreme Court action.

On May 25, the state Supreme Court held hearings on the legality of issuing the licenses. San Francisco had wanted the question decided first by jury trials in lower courts rather than by the state Supreme Court. The Supreme Court suggested that San Francisco could file its own suit against the state, and the city filed such a suit that afternoon.

On August 12, exactly six months after the first licenses were issued to same-sex couples in San Francisco, the state Supreme Court ruled unanimously that the City and County of San Francisco had exceeded its authority and violated state law by issuing the marriage licenses. In a 5-2 decision in Lockyer v. City and County of San Francisco, the court also declared all same-sex marriages performed in San Francisco on the basis of those licenses to be void. It expressed no opinion on the constitutionality of the denial of marriage rights to same-sex couples.

== Later developments ==
Following the decision in Lockyer, the City and County of San Francisco filed a suit in Superior Court, seeking a declaration that "all California statutory provisions limiting marriage to unions between a man and a woman violate the California Constitution." That action and a series of others brought by advocacy groups were consolidated in a single proceeding called In re Marriage Cases, in which the California Supreme Court held on May 15, 2008, that denying marriage licenses to same-sex couples violated the California Constitution.

== Political assessments ==
On February 18, 2004, President George Bush declined to say whether he thought a constitutional amendment to ban same-sex marriage was needed, but said:

I have watched carefully what's happening in San Francisco, where licenses were being issued, even though the law states otherwise. I have consistently stated that I'll support law to protect marriage between a man and a woman. Obviously these events are influencing my decision.

On February 24, he announced his support for a federal constitutional amendment that would "fully protect marriage while leaving the state legislatures free to make their own choices in defining legal arrangements other than marriage". His political supporters saw it as a way to underscore the fact that his likely opponent in the presidential race, Senator John Kerry of Massachusetts, had voted against the 1996 Defense of Marriage Act, which defined marriage as the union of a man and a woman.

Republican consultant Ed Rollins and California Senate Republican Leader Jim Brulte thought scenes from these marriages would help recruit Republican voters to the polls in the 2004 election. On the other hand, Newsom and San Francisco successfully upstaged the Massachusetts marriages that occurred two months later, which would have reflected even more strongly on the Democratic presidential candidate that year, John Kerry, a senator from Massachusetts.

U.S. Representative from Massachusetts Barney Frank, himself openly gay, criticized San Francisco's actions, saying it was a "symbolic point" that diverted attention from the real struggle for gay rights.

For a brief time following the San Francisco events, several city or county officials in Sandoval County, New Mexico, New Paltz, New York, Multnomah County, Oregon, and Asbury Park, New Jersey also issued marriage licenses to same-sex couples. Officials in Benton County, Oregon were scheduled to begin issuing marriage licenses to same-sex couples, but reneged after the state's Attorney General said the county clerk would be arrested if any such licenses were issued.

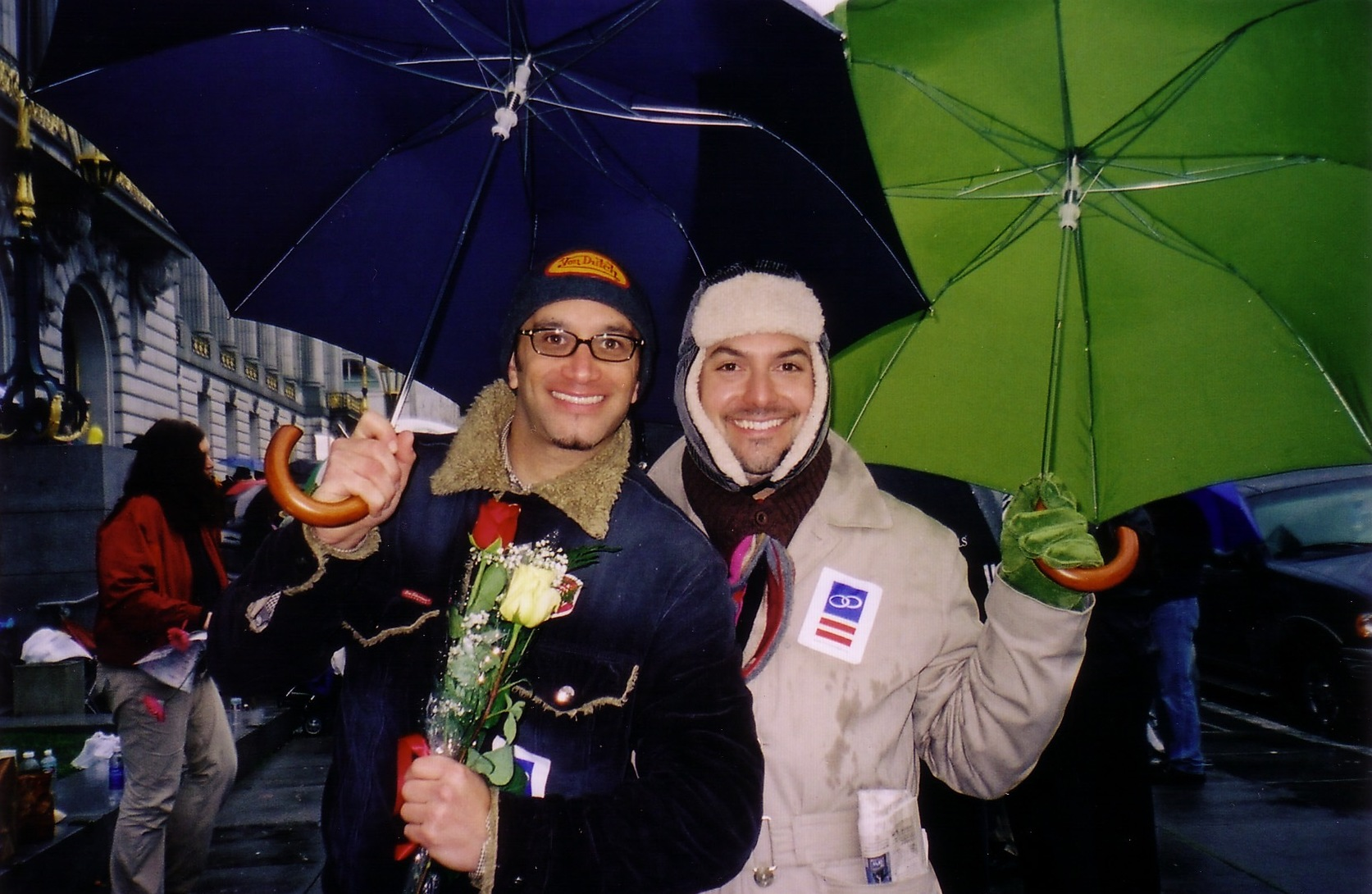
Newlyweds David Michael Barrett & Mark Peters, Feb. 16, 2004

== Notable marriages ==
- Del Martin and Phyllis Lyon, a couple then for 51 years and the founders of Daughters of Bilitis, were the first couple married.
- Alison Bechdel and Amy Rubin, a couple then for 12 years.
- California State Assemblywoman Jackie Goldberg and Sharon Stricker.
- Television Personality Rosie O'Donnell and Kelli Carpenter-O'Donnell
- Screenwriter David Michael Barrett and Mark Peters, who had been together since 1995.
- Filmmakers P. David Ebersole and Todd Hughes, who had been together since 1991.

== See also ==
- Timeline of same-sex marriage in the United States
- Same-sex marriage in California
- LGBT culture in San Francisco
