= 2005 in LGBTQ rights =

This is a list of notable events in the history of LGBTQ rights that took place in the year 2005.

== Events ==
=== January ===
- 1
  - California law AB 205, which extends many rights and responsibilities of marriage to registered domestic partners, goes into effect. The new law expands domestic partnership statutes to include most marriage rights available under state law. California domestic partnerships are available to opposite-sex couples age 62 and older who meet certain Social Security qualifications and to all same-sex couples age 18 and older without further qualification.
  - In Germany, stepchild adoption and some additional rights for same-sex civil unions go into effect.
- 21 – US state of Illinois bans discrimination based on sexual orientation or gender identity in the private sector.
- 25 – The Alameda County, California, Board of Supervisors votes 4–0 to prohibit discrimination in public-sector employment, services and facilities based on gender identity.

=== February ===
- 1 – Canadian federal government introduces Bill C-38, the Civil Marriage Act, which would legalize same-sex marriage in all provinces and territories.
- 4 – In the U.S. state of New York, state Supreme Court judge Doris Ling-Cohan rules in favor of a lawsuit by five same-sex couples, stating that a ban on same-sex marriage violates the state's constitution.

=== March ===
- 14 – San Francisco County Superior Court judge Richard Kramer rules that the state's ban on same-sex marriage is unconstitutional.
- 15 – The Cincinnati, Ohio city council passes a gay rights ordinance after voters repealed the anti-gay Issue 3 in 2005.
- 31 – In the U.S. state of Maine, the state's Human Rights Act is amended to ban discrimination based on sexual orientation (which is defined to include gender identity) in the private sector. The act would be the subject of a referendum November 8, in which it would be endorsed by voters.

=== April ===
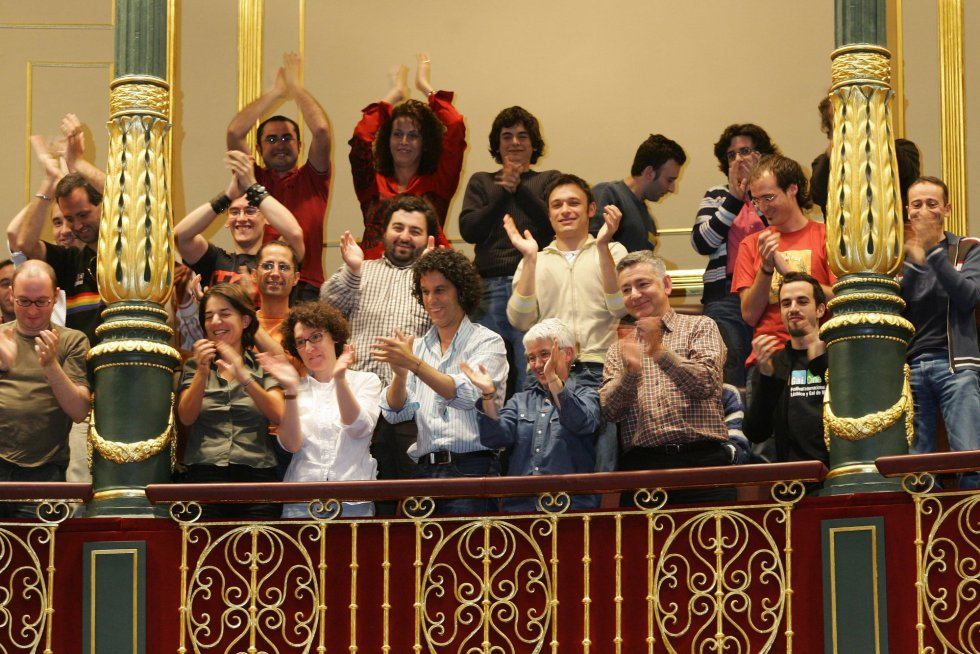
Celebration in the gallery overlooking the Congress of Deputies in Spain, upon passage of same-sex marriage legislation

- 5 – In the U.S. state of Kansas, voters approve an amendment to the state constitution banning same-sex marriages and civil unions.
- 20 – In the U.S. state of Connecticut, the state legislature approves a law to allow same-sex civil unions effective October 1.
- 21
  - In Spain, the Congress of Deputies passes legislation to legalize same-sex marriage.
  - In its home state of Washington, the Microsoft corporation withdraws support for H.B. 1515, after pressure from local clergyman Ken Hutcherson. The bill would have made it illegal to fire an employee based on sexual orientation. Hutcherson threatened the company with a nationwide boycott.
- 22 – H.B. 1515 is defeated in the Washington state senate by a single vote. Two Democratic-party lawmakers join all 23 Republican state senators to defeat the bill.
- 25 – Four same-sex couples in the Canadian province of New Brunswick ask their Court of Appeal to extend marriage rights to same-sex couples.
- 26 – Civil unions begin in New Zealand.

=== May ===
- 20 – In Canada, a same-sex couple from the Northwest Territories sue the government over the right to be married.
- 23 – In the United States, the American Psychiatric Association votes at its annual convention to support government-recognized marriages between same-sex partners.

=== June ===
- 5 – Fifty-eight percent of voters in Switzerland vote in favor of extending rights for registered civil unions for same-sex couples. This is the first time that the topic has been put to a national referendum. Same-sex couples will be treated in the same way as opposite-sex married couples in terms of pension and taxes. However, they will not be able to marry, to adopt children or undergo fertility treatment.
- 21
  - Jerrold Nadler, U.S. congressman from New York, reintroduces H.R. 3006 in the U.S. House of Representatives.
  - Patrick Leahy, U.S. senator from Vermont, reintroduces the Permanent Partners Immigration Act/Uniting American Families Act (S. 1278) in the U.S. Senate.
- 28 – The House of Commons of Canada passes Bill C-38, a proposed law to legalize same-sex marriage on a national basis, by a vote of 158–133.
- 30
  - In Spain, the Congress of Deputies passes legislation to legalize same-sex marriage.
  - Legislation is introduced in the U.S. House of Representatives to ban discrimination based upon sexual orientation in hiring practices among the federal workforce.

=== July ===
- July 1
  - Bill Lockyer, attorney general of the state of California, asks the California Supreme Court to decide whether same-sex marriage is permitted under the state's constitution.
  - A group of gay veterans rally in Austin, Texas, to protest state governor Rick Perry's comments that gay military veterans should leave Texas. An estimated 65,000 lesbian, gay, bisexual, and transgender veterans live in Texas.
- 3 – Same-sex marriage (with step-child and joint adoption) begins in Spain
- 5 – Uganda amends its constitution to prohibit same-sex marriage.
- 19 – The Senate of Canada passes Bill C-38 by a vote of 47–21.
- 20 – Bill C-38 receives Royal Assent, legalizing same-sex marriage in Canada nationwide. The first same-sex couple to receive a marriage license under the new law is a couple from Alberta.

=== August ===
- 26 – In Thomas McCosker v The State the High Court of Fiji invalidates the country's sodomy law as a violation of constitutional guarantees prohibiting discrimination on the basis of sexual orientation.
- 31 – In U.S. v. Blaylockthe United States Court of Appeals for the Eighth Circuit denied an appeal based on the exclusion of a potential juror which the defendant alleged was based on the juror's sexual orientation. The appeal had sought to extend to sexual orientation the protections of Batson v. Kentucky, which forbids excluding potential jurors based on race.

=== September ===
- 6 – The California Legislature passes a bill (by 21 to 15 in the Senate, 41 to 35 in the Assembly) to legalize same-sex marriage, becoming the first state legislature in the U.S. to do so without judicial prompting.
- 22 – American Medical Association (AMA) president Edward Hill, MD, gives a keynote address to the delegates of the Gay and Lesbian Medical Association (GLMA) at the organization's annual conference being held in Montreal. In his speech, he acknowledged past unfair treatment of GLMA members and LGBTQ physicians by the AMA.
- 29 – Arnold Schwarzenegger, governor of California, vetoes the bill passed on September 6 legalizing same-sex marriage.

=== October ===
- 9 – Kansas Equality Coalition is founded, uniting groups in five regions that fought against the passage of the state constitutional amendment banning same-sex marriage.
- 21 – In State v. Limon, the Kansas Supreme Court strikes down a clause of the state's "Romeo and Juliet" law that punished underage sex more severely if it involved homosexual acts.

=== November ===
- 8 – In a referendum, Maine voters reject a measure to repeal a bill enacted in March banning discrimination based on sexual orientation (including gender identity) in the private sector.
- 15 – André Boisclair is chosen leader of the Parti Québécois, becoming the first openly gay man elected leader of a major political party in North America.

=== December ===
- Latvia amends its constitution to prohibit same-sex marriage.
- 1 – The Constitutional Court of South Africa hands down its judgment in the case of Minister of Home Affairs v Fourie, declaring that it is unconstitutional for the government to allow marriage for opposite-sex couples but not for same-sex couples. The judgment is suspended for one year to allow Parliament to rectify the discrimination.
- 5 – Civil partnerships begin in the United Kingdom.
- 9 – The First Department of the Appellate Division overrules an order from Judge Doris Ling-Cohan in February 2005 to allow gay marriages in New York City.
- 10 – In Houston, Texas, businesswoman Sue Lovell wins an at-large vacancy on the city council, joining city controller Annise Parker as the first two openly gay persons to be elected to office in the city of Houston.
- 16 – Mark Warner, governor of the U.S. state of Virginia, issues an executive order banning sexual orientation discrimination in the public sector.

== Deaths ==
- June 4 – Jean O'Leary, 57, U.S. gay rights activist
- October 14 – Jody Dobrowski, 24, British murder victim targeted for being gay
- November 25 – Pierre Seel, 82, Nazi concentration camp survivor

== See also ==
- Timeline of LGBTQ history – timeline of events from 12,000 BCE to present
- LGBTQ rights by country or territory – current legal status around the world
- LGBTQ social movements
