= In re Marriage Cases =

2008 California Supreme Court case

- Supreme Court of California

Argued March 4, 2008 Decided May 15, 2008
- Full case name: In re MARRIAGE CASES. [Six consolidated appeals.]
- Citation(s): 43 Cal. 4th 757 (2008)

Case history
- Prior history: Judgment for Plaintiffs reversed, 143 Cal.App.4th 873 (2006) [49 Cal.Rptr.3d 675]
- Subsequent history: Rehearing and Stay of Remittitur Denied June 4, 2008

Holding
- 1. Sexual orientation is recognized as a suspect class for purposes of the Equal Protection Clause of the California Constitution.; 2. Offering a legal relationship called "marriage" to opposite-sex couples while consigning gay couples to "domestic partnerships" impinges upon the fundamental right to marry by denying such legal relationships equal dignity and respect.; 3. The distinction between marriage and domestic partnerships risks the right to privacy regarding sexual orientation for those in domestic partnerships.; 4. Both because a suspect class is targeted and because fundamental rights are impinged upon by the challenged provisions, the strict scrutiny standard of review applies, under which those provisions limiting marriage to opposite-sex couples must serve a compelling state interest and be necessary to serve such an interest. Neither being the case, laws limiting marriage to opposite-sex couples are unconstitutional.

Court membership
- Chief Justice: Ronald M. George
- Associate Justices: Joyce L. Kennard, Marvin R. Baxter, Kathryn M. Werdegar, Ming W. Chin, Carlos R. Moreno, Carol A. Corrigan

Case opinions
- Majority: George, joined by Kennard, Werdegar, Moreno
- Concurrence: Kennard
- Concur/dissent: Baxter, joined by Chin
- Concur/dissent: Corrigan

Laws applied
- Cal. Const. art. 1 §§ 1, 7, and Cal. Fam. Code §§ 300, 308.5
- Superseded by
- California Proposition 8 (in part) Note: Proposition 8 was ruled unconstitutional in Hollingsworth v. Perry, restoring the full legal effect of the decision in In re Marriage Cases. California Proposition 3 repealed Proposition 8, codifying the decision in In re Marriage Cases in the California Constitution.

In re Marriage Cases, 43 Cal. 4th 757 (Cal. 2008) was a California Supreme Court case where the court held that laws treating classes of persons differently based on sexual orientation should be subject to strict judicial scrutiny, and that an existing statute and initiative measure (California Proposition 22 limiting marriage to opposite-sex couples) violate the rights of same-sex couples under the California Constitution and may not be used to preclude them from marrying.

On May 15, 2008, the California Supreme Court ruled in a 4–3 decision that laws directed at gay and lesbian people are subject to strict scrutiny and same-sex couples' access to marriage is a fundamental right under Article 1, Section 7 of the California Constitution. The court found that two statutes barring same-sex marriage in California, one enacted in 1977 by the legislature and the other in 2000 by state voters (Proposition 22), were unconstitutional. The decision was the first in the United States to establish sexual orientation as a suspect classification. On June 4, 2008, the court denied a request for rehearing and a request to put a hold on the ruling, affirming that the decision would take effect as scheduled. The writ of mandate directing the state government to comply with the ruling and grant same-sex marriages was issued by the Superior Court of California on June 19, 2008.

On November 4, 2008, California voters approved Proposition 8, which limited marriage under the California Constitution to opposite-sex couples. This decision did not disturb that part of the court's holding that gay men and lesbians constitute a suspect class for purposes of equal protection under Art. I § 7.

The Supreme Court of California joined the Supreme Judicial Court of Massachusetts as the second state to have its highest court rule prohibitions on same-sex marriage unconstitutional, although for somewhat different reasons. Later in 2008, the Connecticut Supreme Court handed down a similar decision, as did the Iowa Supreme Court in April 2009 (see Varnum v. Brien). Before a series of federal court cases occurred striking down various states' prohibition of same-sex marriage, the New Mexico Supreme Court also struck down the state's prohibition of same-sex marriage in a unanimous decision in December 2013.

The judgment In re Marriage Cases was in part mooted by Strauss v. Horton, 46 Cal.4th 364 (2009), which was itself mooted by Hollingsworth v. Perry (2013). On November 5, 2024, California voters repealed Proposition 8.

== Procedural history ==
At the direction of Mayor Gavin Newsom, the Office of the County Clerk of San Francisco "designed revised forms for the marriage license application and for the license and certificate of marriage, and on February 12, 2004, the City and County of San Francisco began issuing marriage licenses to same-sex couples." On February 13, two organizations, the Proposition 22 Legal Defense and Education Fund, and the Campaign for California Families, filed actions in San Francisco Superior Court (the court of first instance) seeking an immediate stay to prohibit the City from issuing marriage licenses to same-sex couples.

The Superior court refused to grant the groups' request for an immediate stay, and the City and County continued to issue marriage licenses to same-sex couples. Following this, the California Attorney General and a number of taxpayers filed two separate petitions seeking to have the California Supreme Court issue an original writ of mandate, asserting that the City's actions were unlawful and "warranted [the court's] immediate intervention." On March 11, 2004, the California Supreme Court ordered officials of San Francisco "to enforce the existing marriage statutes and to refrain from issuing marriage licenses not authorized by such provisions." The Court later held in Lockyer v. City and County of San Francisco that the City and County had acted unlawfully, but was free to bring an action challenging the constitutionality of the marriage laws if it wished. The City and County of San Francisco then filed a Petition for writ of mandate in Superior Court, seeking a declaration that "all California statutory provisions limiting marriage to unions between a man and a woman violate the California Constitution." All six actions were consolidated (coordinated) in a single proceeding called In re Marriage Cases. LGBT rights groups, including Equality California, Lambda Legal's Jenny C. Pizer and the National Center for Lesbian Rights, were also among the plaintiffs.

San Francisco Superior Court Judge Richard A. Kramer held for the plaintiffs, finding that the marriage restriction was invalid under the strict scrutiny standard based on a suspect classification of gender. In October 2006, in a two-to-one decision, the First District of the Court of Appeal of California reversed the superior court's ruling on the substantive constitutional issue, disagreeing in a number of significant respects with the lower court's analysis of the equal protection issue." The California Supreme Court, however, then reversed the decision of the Court of Appeal.

The Supreme Court opinion, written by Chief Justice Ronald George, cited the court's 1948 decision in Perez v. Sharp that reversed the state's interracial marriages ban. The court found that "equal respect and dignity" of marriage is a "basic civil right" that cannot be withheld from same-sex couples, that sexual orientation is a protected class like race and gender, and that any classification or discrimination on the basis of sexual orientation is subject to strict scrutiny under the Equal Protection Clause of the California State Constitution. It was the first state high court in the country to do so. The Massachusetts Supreme Judicial Court, by contrast, did not find sexual orientation to be a protected class, and instead voided its gay-marriage ban on rational basis review.

After the announcement, the Advocates for Faith and Freedom and the Alliance Defense Fund, among others, stated they would ask for a stay of the ruling. Governor Arnold Schwarzenegger immediately issued a statement pledging to uphold the ruling, and repeated his pledge to oppose Proposition 8.

In a one-page Resolution, the California Supreme Court on June 4, 2008, denied all petitions for rehearing and to reconsider the May 15 ruling, as it removed the final obstacle to same-sex marriages starting on June 17. It further rejected moves to delay enforcement of the decision until after the November election, when voters would decide whether to reinstate a ban on same-sex nuptials. Chief Justice Ronald George and Justices Joyce Kennard, Kathryn Mickle Werdegar, and Carlos Moreno voted against reconsideration, while voting to reconsider the judgment were Justices Marvin Baxter, Ming Chin, and Carol Corrigan.

== Quotations ==
In the majority decision:

[U]nder this state's Constitution, the constitutionally based right to marry properly must be understood to encompass the core set of basic substantive legal rights and attributes traditionally associated with marriage that are so integral to an individual's liberty and personal autonomy that they may not be eliminated or abrogated by the Legislature or by the electorate through the statutory initiative process.

[S]trict scrutiny ... is applicable here because (1) the statutes in question properly must be understood as classifying or discriminating on the basis of sexual orientation, a characteristic that we conclude represents — like gender, race, and religion — a constitutionally suspect basis upon which to impose differential treatment, and (2) the differential treatment at issue impinges upon a same-sex couple's fundamental interest in having their family relationship accorded the same respect and dignity enjoyed by an opposite-sex couple.

[T]he exclusion of same-sex couples from the designation of marriage clearly is not necessary in order to afford full protection to all of the rights and benefits that currently are enjoyed by married opposite-sex couples.

[T]he right to marry is not properly viewed simply as a benefit or privilege that a government may establish or abolish as it sees fit, but rather that the right constitutes a basic civil or human right of all people."

In the concurrence and dissent of Justice Baxter:

Nothing in our Constitution, express or implicit, compels the majority's startling conclusion that the age-old understanding of marriage—an understanding recently confirmed by an initiative law—is no longer valid. California statutes already recognize same-sex unions and grant them all the substantive legal rights this state can bestow. If there is to be a further sea change in the social and legal understanding of marriage itself, that evolution should occur by similar democratic means. The majority forecloses this ordinary democratic process, and, in doing so, oversteps its authority.

[T]he majority's approach has removed the sensitive issues surrounding same-sex marriage from their proper forum—the arena of legislative resolution—and risks opening the door to similar treatment of other, less deserving, claims of a right to marry. By thus moving the policy debate from the legislative process to the court, the majority engages in faulty constitutional analysis and violates the separation of powers.

If such a profound change in this ancient social institution is to occur, the People and their representatives, who represent the public conscience, should have the right, and the responsibility, to control the pace of that change through the democratic process. Family Code sections 300 and 308.5 serve this salutary purpose. The majority's decision erroneously usurps it.

In the concurrence and dissent by Justice Corrigan:

The process of reform and familiarization should go forward in the legislative sphere and in society at large. We are in the midst of a major social change. Societies seldom make such changes smoothly. For some the process is frustratingly slow. For others it is jarringly fast. In a democracy, the people should be given a fair chance to set the pace of change without judicial interference. That is the way democracies work. Ideas are proposed, debated, tested. Often new ideas are initially resisted, only to be ultimately embraced. But when ideas are imposed, opposition hardens and progress may be hampered.

== See also ==
- California Proposition 8 (2008)
- California Proposition 22 (2000)
- Constitutional law
- Family law
- History of marriage in California
- Lawsuits to overturn Proposition 8
- Same-sex marriage in California
- Same-sex marriage in the United States
- Strauss v. Horton, 46 Cal.4th 364 (2009)
