= Same-sex marriage in California =

Same-sex marriage has been legal in California since June 28, 2013. The State of California first issued marriage licenses to same-sex couples from June 16, 2008, to November 5, 2008, as a result of the Supreme Court of California finding in the case of In re Marriage Cases that barring same-sex couples from marriage violated the Constitution of California. The issuance of such licenses was halted from November 5, 2008, through June 27, 2013 (though existing same-sex marriages continued to be valid), due to the passage of Proposition 8—a state constitutional amendment barring same-sex marriages. The granting of same-sex marriages resumed following the U.S. Supreme Court's decision in Hollingsworth v. Perry, which restored the effect of a federal district court ruling that overturned Proposition 8 as unconstitutional. In 2024, the passage of Proposition 3 repealed Proposition 8.

California was the second U.S. state (after Massachusetts) to legalize same-sex marriage. Those marriages granted under the laws of other state governments, foreign and domestic, were legally recognized and retained state-level rights since 2008. On November 12, 2008, Connecticut took over California's former position as the second state issuing legal same-sex marriages. On November 5, 2024, California voters passed Proposition 3, a constitutional amendment that enshrined the right to same-sex and interracial marriage in the state constitution. The measure passed with 63% of the vote.

== History ==
From February 12 to March 11, 2004, under the direction of Mayor Gavin Newsom, officials in San Francisco issued marriage licenses to approximately 4,000 same-sex couples despite it being illegal to do so at both the state and federal level. During the month that licenses were issued, couples traveled from all over the United States and from other countries to be married. On August 12, citing Newsom's lack of authority to bypass state law, the Supreme Court of California ruled that the marriages were void. Consolidated lawsuits against the state government in favor of same-sex marriage eventually reached the Supreme Court of California. On May 15, 2008, it overturned the state's ban on same-sex marriage with its ruling In re Marriage Cases. The four-to-three decision took effect on June 16, 2008. Two weeks earlier, an initiative to override this result of the court decision qualified for the November election ballot. The court declined to stay its decision until after the November elections. Some reports suggested that out-of-state same-sex couples would marry in California prior to the 2008 elections because California does not require the marriage to be valid in the couple's home state.

The ballot initiative, Proposition 8, a state constitutional amendment titled Eliminates Right of Same-Sex Couples to Marry Act, appeared on the California general election ballot on November 4, 2008 and passed with a 52% majority. One supporter of Proposition 8 was the Church of Jesus Christ of Latter-day Saints, which donated $20 million to campaign for its passage. The California Supreme Court heard several challenges to Proposition 8 in March 2009, but ultimately upheld the amendment, though the over 18,000 same-sex marriages that were performed before the amendment was passed remained valid.

In the wake of Proposition 8's passage, California continued to allow domestic partnerships. This granted same-sex couples almost all state-level rights and obligations of marriage, but did not apply to "federal-level rights of marriage that cannot be granted by states." Before Proposition 8 passed, the Williams Institute projected in June 2008 that about half of California's more than 100,000 same-sex couples would wed during the next three years and 68,000 out-of-state couples would travel to California to exchange vows.

On August 4, 2010, U.S. District Court Chief Judge Vaughn Walker declared Proposition 8 a violation of the Due Process and Equal Protection clauses of the U.S. Constitution in Perry v. Schwarzenegger, a decision upheld by the Ninth Circuit Court of Appeals on February 7, 2012. The case, known as Perry v. Brown in the Ninth Circuit, was appealed to the U.S. Supreme Court on July 31, 2012. The case was granted review as Hollingsworth v. Perry on December 7, 2012 and a decision was issued on June 26, 2013. The court decided that the official sponsors of Proposition 8 did not have legal standing to appeal the district court decision when the state's public officials refused to do so. The judgment of the Ninth Circuit was vacated and the case was returned to that court with instructions to dismiss the appeal. On June 28, 2013, a stay of execution was lifted and same-sex marriages were able to resume. Same-sex couples began marrying later that day.

== Legislation ==
=== Assembly Bill 607 (1977) ===
From the enactment of legislation in 1971 to replace gendered pronouns with gender-neutral pronouns until 1977, the California Civil Code defined marriage as "a personal relation arising out of a civil contract, to which the consent of the parties capable of making that contract is necessary." This definition was uniformly interpreted as including only opposite-sex partners, but, because of worries that the language was unclear, Assembly Bill 607, authored by Assemblyman Bruce Nestande, was proposed and later passed in 1977 to "prohibit persons of the same sex from entering lawful marriage".

Fears that the Civil Code would allow marriage between parties of the same sex had arisen due to a couple in Orange County who sought a marriage license after the passage of legislation which repealed the criminality of homosexuality in California in 1976. The Orange County Clerks Association submitted a call to Nestande to clarify the law as it pertained to same-sex couples. The act amended the Civil Code to define marriage as "a personal relation arising out of a civil contract between a man and a woman, to which the consent of the parties capable of making that contract is necessary". Opponents of the bill included Assemblyman Willie Brown and Senator Milton Marks. The bill passed 23–5 in the California State Senate and 68–2 in the Assembly. It was signed into law on August 17, 1977 by Governor Jerry Brown. The section was repealed in 2015.

Legislation (known as AB 167), authored by Assemblyman John Burton, in 1991 would have deleted gender requirements. It failed to garner enough votes for passages and died in the Assembly. The bill was supported by the San Francisco Bar Association, which had issued a statement in favor of same-sex marriage in 1989, and the California Lawyers Association.

=== Proposition 22 (2000) ===
Following Senator William J. Knight's failure to pass anti-marriage legislation on two different occasions in 1995 and 1997 in the California State Legislature, Proposition 22 was created as an initiative statute to add section 308.5 to the Family Code, largely replicated the 1977 language.

In the March 7, 2000 primary election, Proposition 22 was adopted by a vote of 61% to 39%, thus adding section 308.5 to the Family Code, largely replicating the 1977 enactment. The one-sentence code section explicitly defined "the union of a man and a woman as the only valid or recognizable form of marriage" in California. Proposition 22 was authored by Senator Knight, and the measure was dubbed the "Knight initiative" in an attempt to link it to the failed Briggs Initiative of 1978 that would have banned gays and lesbians from working as teachers in California's public schools. The California Supreme Court invalidated the results of Proposition 22 in 2008.

Proposition 22 was formally cited as The California Defense of Marriage Act.

=== Passage of same-sex marriage legislation (2005–2007) ===
When California State Legislature opened the 2005–2006 session, Assemblyman Mark Leno introduced Assembly Bill 19 (AB 19), which proposed legalizing same-sex marriage. The bill gained the support of Speaker Fabian Núñez among others. Leno had introduced a similar bill in the prior session, but it died in committee. Assembly committees reported out AB 19 favorably, but the measure failed on the Assembly floor on June 2, 2005. Later that month, Assemblywoman Patty Berg amended the text of her fisheries-research measure, Assembly Bill 849 (AB 849), which was already in the Senate, to the text of Leno's failed bill.

On September 2, 2005, the California Senate approved the bill 21–15, and on September 6 the California State Assembly followed suit with a vote of 41–35, making the California State Legislature the first in the nation to approve a same-sex marriage bill without court pressure. The next day, September 7, Governor Arnold Schwarzenegger indicated he would veto the bill, citing Proposition 22, which had passed with the approval of a majority of voters five years earlier. The State Legislature avoided physically delivering the bill to Governor Schwarzenegger for over two weeks, during which time advocacy groups urged him to change his mind. Ultimately, the bill was delivered on September 23 and vetoed on September 29, 2005. Schwarzenegger said he believed that same-sex marriage should be settled by the courts or another vote by the people via a statewide initiative or referendum. He argued that the State Legislature's bill simply complicated the issue, as the constitutionality of Proposition 22 had not yet been determined, and its ultimate disposition would render AB 849 either unconstitutional (being in conflict with a valid voter initiative) or redundant (being guaranteed by the California Constitution itself, as construed by the courts).

Shortly after the newly-elected Assembly was sworn in, Leno resubmitted a similar bill on December 4, 2006. The bill was passed by the State Legislature in early September 2007, giving Governor Schwarzenegger until October 14, 2007, to either sign or veto the bill. Schwarzenegger had stated months before that he would veto the bill on the grounds that the issue at hand had already been voted on by California voters by way of Proposition 22. Schwarzenegger followed through on his statement and on October 12, 2007, he vetoed the bill. He wrote in his veto statement that to solve the issue of same-sex marriage, the California Supreme Court needed to rule on the constitutionality of Proposition 22.

=== Proposition 8 (2008) ===
Months before the California Supreme Court's ruling, groups who opposed same-sex marriage began circulating initiative petitions. One petition, titled the "California Marriage Protection Act" by its proponents and the "Limit on Marriage" amendment by the California Attorney General on the actual ballot, gathered an estimated 764,063 valid signatures and qualified for the November 4, 2008 ballot as Proposition 8. The measure would add Section 7.5 to Article I of the Constitution of California. It would supersede the part of the Supreme Court's holding that authorized the granting of marriage licenses to same-sex couples. Twelve other proposed amendments since 2004 had failed to qualify to be on the ballot. The ability of the voters to remove a fundamental constitutional right by initiative amendment was challenged. A lawsuit filed on those grounds asking for the removal of Proposition 8 from the ballot was dismissed on July 16, 2008.

On the day after the election, the results remained uncertified. With 100% of precincts reporting, the vote was 52.47% in favor of Proposition 8 and 47.53% opposed, with a difference of about 504,000 votes; as many as 3 million absentee and provisional ballots remained to be counted. The organizers of the "No on Prop 8" campaign conceded defeat on Thursday, November 6, issuing a statement saying, "Tuesday's vote was deeply disappointing to all who believe in equal treatment under the law."

On Wednesday, November 5, 2008, three lawsuits were filed, challenging the validity of Proposition 8 on the grounds that revoking the right of same-sex couples to marry was a constitutional "revision" rather than an "amendment", and therefore required the prior approval of two-thirds of each house of the California State Legislature. Plaintiffs in the various suits included same-sex couples who had married or planned to marry, the cities of San Francisco and Los Angeles and Santa Clara County. The California Supreme Court heard several challenges to Proposition 8 and on May 26, 2009 upheld the proposition but did not overturn previous same-sex marriages which occurred following their ruling in June 2008 and before November 5, 2008. Same-sex marriage supporters considered trying to get another ballot initiative to repeal Proposition 8 on the ballot in the 2012 election, but decided to wait.

=== The Marriage Recognition and Family Protection Act (2009) ===
On October 12, 2009, following the passage of Proposition 8, Governor Schwarzenegger signed into law The Marriage Recognition and Family Protection Act, legislation proposed by Senator Leno. The bill established that some of the same-sex marriages performed outside the state are also recognized by the state of California as "marriage", depending on the date of the union.

On May 26, 2009, the California Supreme Court affirmed that all same-sex marriages performed in California before the passage of Proposition 8 would continue to be valid and be recognized as "marriage". The Marriage Recognition and Family Protection Act also established that a same-sex marriage performed outside the state would be recognized as "marriage" if it occurred before Proposition 8 took effect. This category also included same-sex marriages performed before same-sex marriage became legal in California. It also mandated the full legal recognition of same-sex marriages lawfully performed outside of California after the passage of Proposition 8, with the sole exception that the relationship could not be designated with the word "marriage". The law provided no label to be used in place of "marriage" to describe these relationships; they were not "domestic partnerships". The resumption of same-sex marriage in California on June 28, 2013 effectively supersedes this law with respect to out-of-state same-sex marriages.

=== Senate Bill 1306 (2014) ===
Introduced by Senator Mark Leno on February 21, 2014, Senate Bill 1306 would repeal the 1977 legislation, The Marriage Recognition and Family Protection Act, and Proposition 22. The legislation would remove the statutory reference to marriage as a union "between a man and a woman" from the Family Code and update the law with gender-neutral terms to apply to same-sex marriages as well as different-sex ones. During its passage, some concern was expressed that, by repealing Proposition 22, SB 1306 breached the separation of powers as the State Legislature would be repealing an initiative passed by the voters. However, the consensus of the Assembly Judiciary Committee was that the voters are no more able to pass an unconstitutional, and subsequently enjoined, statute anymore than the State Legislature can. In light of In Re Marriage Cases and Hollingsworth v. Perry, which collectively forbade the enforcement of any law which would prohibit same-sex couples from marrying, the committee determined that the State Legislature has the capacity to repeal enjoined statutes.

SB 1306 was approved by the Senate Judiciary Committee 5–2 on April 8, 2014. On May 1, 2014, the Senate passed the bill on a 25–10 vote. On June 30, it passed the Assembly in a 51–11 vote. It was signed by Governor Brown on July 7 and took effect on January 1, 2015. The statute definition of marriage in California is now the following:

Marriage is a personal relation arising out of a civil contract between two persons, to which the consent of the parties capable of making that contract is necessary. Consent alone does not constitute marriage. Consent must be followed by the issuance of a license and solemnization as authorized by this division, except as provided by Section 425 and Part 4 (commencing with Section 500). [California Family Code § 300]

In April 2016, the State Senate voted 34–2 to approve Senate Bill 1005, introduced by Senator Hannah-Beth Jackson, that updated California law similarly to SB 1306. The Assembly approved the bill by a vote of 63–1 with amendments. The bill went back to the Senate for the amendments' approval, and it was passed by 34 votes to 0. It was signed into law by Governor Brown, and took effect on January 1, 2017.

=== Proposition 3 (2024) ===
Following the U.S. Supreme Court's decision in Dobbs v. Jackson Women's Health Organization, which overturned Roe v. Wade, in June 2022, a group of state lawmakers, including representatives Scott Wiener and Evan Low, said they had prepared a draft bill to repeal Proposition 8 from the California Constitution. The group sought to have a measure put on the November 2024 ballot for approval by voters. Senate President Toni Atkins said, "The door will be opened to undermine all of those rights.", in response to the decision to overrule Roe. Wiener and Low introduced the bill to the State Legislature in February 2023.

On June 26, 2023, the California Assembly voted 67–0 to approve a constitutional amendment repealing the text of Proposition 8 and replacing it with the following: "The right to marry is a fundamental right." On July 13, 2023, the California Senate voted unanimously 31–0 to approve the amendment and refer it to the November 2024 ballot for approval by the electorate. The measure was approved by 62.6% of voters.

== Court challenges ==
=== Trial court decision ===
In February 1993, Benjamin and Marcial Cable-McCarthy submitted an application for a marriage license to the Los Angeles County Clerk's Office, but it was rejected. They had previously changed their names to Cable-McCarthy. Their lawsuit against the Clerk's Office, filed in April 1993, was the first case challenging California's laws on same-sex marriage. However, the case was dismissed by the 2nd District State Court of Appeal in Los Angeles on May 22, 1993. The case, Cable-McCarthy v. California, was then denied a review on appeal by the California Supreme Court. Rather than pursue the case further, the couple chose to await a resolution in Baehr v. Miike, a Hawaii case on the legality of same-sex marriage, which subsequently lost in the Hawaii Supreme Court in 1999.

In Smelt v. Orange County, Arthur Smelt and Christopher Hammer, a same-sex couple together for 8 years, sued in federal court, challenging the federal Defense of Marriage Act (DOMA) and Proposition 22. Judge Gary L. Taylor of the U.S. District Court for the Central District of California ruled against the couple in June 2005, upholding the federal law and declining to consider the California law. The Ninth Circuit Court of Appeals dismissed the case on appeal in May 2006, and the U.S. Supreme Court denied review on October 10, 2006.

San Francisco and numerous individuals sued the state of California seeking to overturn Proposition 22, the state law that limited marriage to opposite-sex couples. Among the different cases were City and County of San Francisco v. State of California, Tyler vs. State of California, filed by two same-sex couples, Woo and Chung v. Lockyer, filed by the American Civil Liberties Union, Lambda Legal and the National Center for Lesbian Rights, and three more. All challenged the state's ban on same-sex marriage. Five of the cases were filed in the San Francisco County Superior Court and one case in the Los Angeles County Superior Court. Eventually, all six cases were coordinated (In re Marriage Cases) and assigned to San Francisco Superior Court Judge Richard Kramer. On March 14, 2005, Judge Kramer ruled that California statutes limiting marriage to opposite-sex couples were unconstitutional. The court held there was no rational connection between forbidding same-sex marriage and any legitimate state interest and the opposite-sex requirements impermissibly discriminated based on gender.

=== Appellate court decision ===
The state and organizations opposed to same-sex marriage appealed. Division Three of the First District Court of Appeal held extended oral arguments on the cases on July 10, 2006, before a three-judge panel. In a 2-to-1 decision, the appellate court overturned the lower court. Writing for the majority, Presiding Justice William R. McGuiness found: The marriage statutes do not discriminate based on gender; the state's interests in "preserving the traditional definition of marriage" and "carrying out the expressed wishes of a majority of Californians" were sufficient to preserve the existing law; and challenges from the two groups opposed to same-sex marriage had to be dismissed because they lacked standing in any actual controversy on which the court could rule.

The majority emphasized that it was not the role of the court to determine whether the "traditional definition" of marriage should be maintained. "The time may come when California chooses to expand the definition of marriage to encompass same-sex unions," McGuiness wrote. "That change must come from democratic processes, however, not by judicial fiat." In a sharply worded dissent, Justice J. Anthony Kline (Presiding Justice of Division Two, sitting by designation because two justices had recused themselves) described the court's reasoning as "circular". He wrote that the majority's indifference to the reasons why marriage is a fundamental right unintentionally "diminish the humanity of the lesbians and gay men whose rights are defeated". Both justices in the majority commented at length on Justice Kline's dissent.

=== Supreme Court of California review ===
In November 2006, several parties petitioned the Supreme Court of California to review the decision. Attorney General Bill Lockyer asked the Supreme Court to take up the case. In December 2006, the Supreme Court voted unanimously to review all six cases and held oral arguments on March 4, 2008, consolidating the cases as In re Marriage Cases.

On May 15, 2008, the Supreme Court struck down California's statutes limiting marriage to opposite-sex couples in a 4–3 ruling. The judicial ruling overturned the anti-marriage law which the State Legislature had passed in 1977 and Proposition 22. After the ruling, Governor Arnold Schwarzenegger issued a statement repeating his pledge to oppose Proposition 8, the ballot initiative that would override the ruling.

The opinion, written by Chief Justice Ronald M. George, cited the court's 1948 decision in Perez v. Sharp where the state's interracial marriage ban was held unconstitutional. It found that "equal respect and dignity" of marriage is a "basic civil right" that cannot be withheld from same-sex couples, that sexual orientation is a protected class like race and gender, and that any classification or discrimination on the basis of sexual orientation is subject to strict scrutiny under the Equal Protection Clause of the California State Constitution. Associate Justices Joyce L. Kennard, Kathryn Werdegar, and Carlos R. Moreno concurred. It was the first state high court in the country to do so. The Massachusetts Supreme Judicial Court, by contrast, did not find sexual orientation to be a protected class, and instead voided its same-sex marriage ban on a rational basis review in Goodridge v. Department of Public Health in 2003.

After the announcement, the Advocates for Faith and Freedom and the Alliance Defense Fund, inter alia, asked for a stay of the ruling. In a one-page order on June 4, 2008, the court denied all petitions for rehearing or to reconsider the May 15 ruling and rejected moves to delay enforcement of the decision until after the November election, when Californians would vote on a constitutional amendment to overturn the decision. As a result, same-sex marriages took place starting in mid-June. Chief Justice George and Justices Kennard, Werdegar and Moreno voted for the resolution, while dissenting or voting to reconsider the judgment, were Justices Marvin R. Baxter, Ming Chin and Carol Corrigan. The order stated, "The decision filed on May 15, 2008, will become final on June 16, 2008, at 5 p.m.." San Francisco Mayor Gavin Newsom announced that marriages would be held starting at 5:01 p.m. on June 16. The final stage of the case was the issuance of a writ of mandate by the Superior Court to the Registrar of Vital Statistics on June 19, 2008.

=== Legal challenges to Proposition 8 ===
On June 20, 2008, gay rights groups filed suit with the California Supreme Court seeking to remove the initiative from the November ballot; their lawsuit was later dismissed on July 16, 2008. They argued that the changes would constitute a revision to the California Constitution, which requires a two-thirds vote of the State Legislature before being placed before voters, rather than a mere amendment, which does not require involvement by the State Legislature. They further argued that the original petitions, which were circulated before the May 15 court decision, were misleading because the petitions said the initiative would not change the marriage laws and would have no fiscal impact.

Prior to the election date, backers of Proposition 8 also filed a lawsuit after Attorney General Jerry Brown changed the title of the initiative from "Limit on Marriage" to "Eliminates the Right of Same-Sex Couples to Marry". On August 8, 2008, Superior Court Judge Timothy Frawley ruled that "The Attorney General did not abuse his discretion in concluding that the chief purpose and effect of the initiative is to eliminate the right of same-sex couples to marry", so the new name would appear on the ballots.

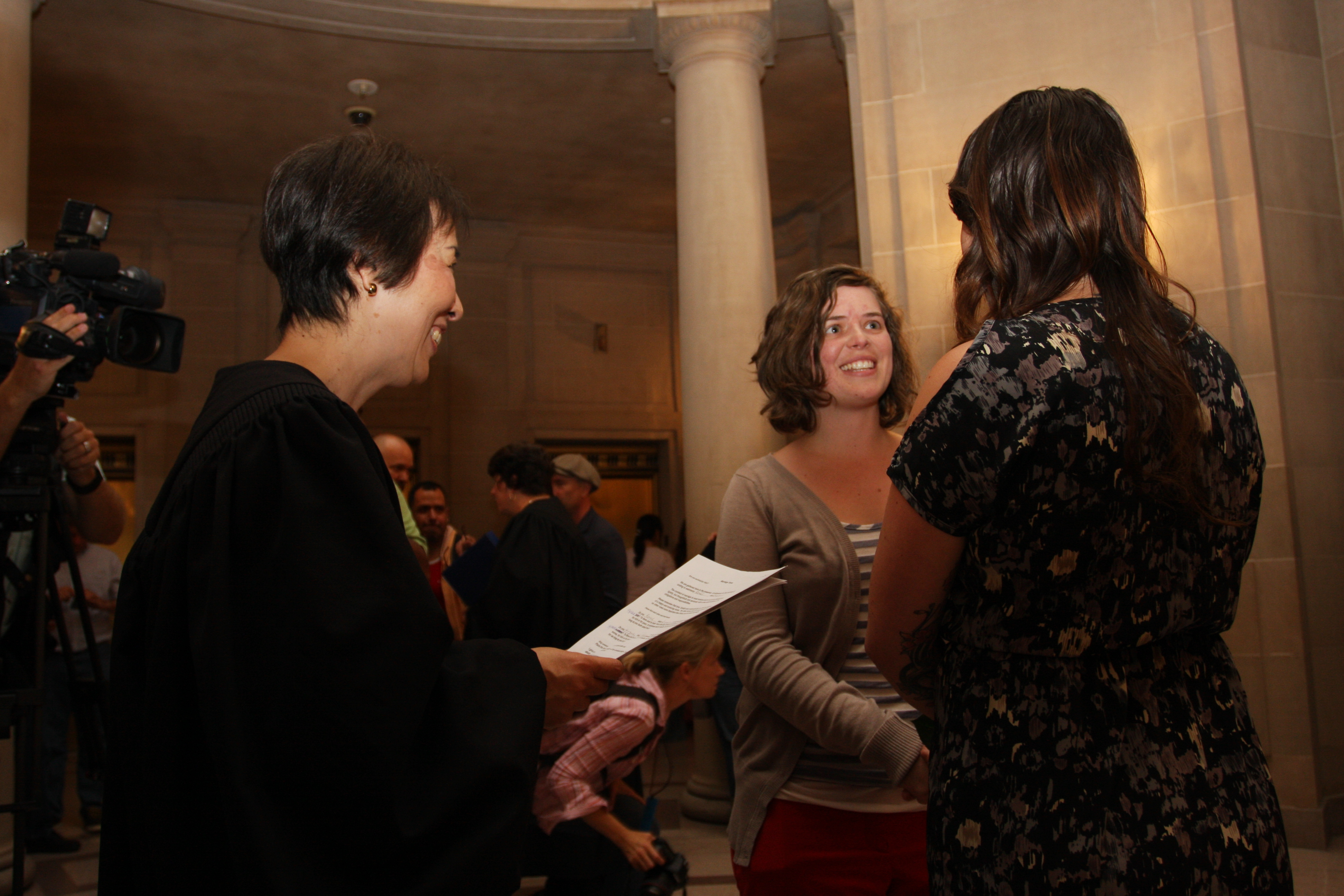
A same-sex marriage solemnized at San Francisco City Hall on June 28, 2013, just hours after the Ninth Circuit stay was lifted.

On the day of the Strauss v. Horton decision on May 26, 2009–in which the Supreme Court of California upheld Proposition 8 as a lawful amendment of the State Constitution–the American Foundation for Equal Rights (AFER) filed suit in the U.S. District Court for the Northern District of California to challenge the validity of Proposition 8 under the U.S. Constitution in a case known as Perry v. Schwarzenegger. Judge Vaughn Walker ordered a full trial which began in January 2010. It addressed questions as wide-ranging as whether being gay diminishes one's contribution to society, affects one's ability to raise children, impairs judgment, or constitutes a mental disorder. Judge Walker ruled that Proposition 8 was unconstitutional, violating both the Due Process and Equal Protection clauses of the U.S. Constitution, and on August 12, 2010, had scheduled to deny a motion to stay the ruling throughout the appeals process. On August 16, 2010, the Ninth Circuit Court of Appeals granted the motion to stay, ordered expedited briefing on the merits of the appeal, and directed the parties to brief the issue of why the appeal should not be dismissed for lack of standing. On August 17, the same Ninth Circuit panel ordered expedited briefing on the Imperial County appeal. The court also ordered both appeals calendared for oral arguments during the week of December 6, 2010 in San Francisco. On February 7, 2012, in a 2–1 decision, a three judge panel of the Ninth Circuit affirmed the trial court's decision in Perry v. Brown, which it stayed pending appeal. Proponents of Proposition 8 appealed to the U.S. Supreme Court on July 31, 2012, and the court granted certiorari on December 7, 2012 as Hollingsworth v. Perry. On June 26, 2013, the U.S. Supreme Court found that the Proposition 8 supporters did not have standing for their appeal, and thus ordered the Ninth Circuit to void their ruling, leaving Walker's decision standing. The Ninth Circuit lifted its stay on June 28, allowing same-sex marriages to proceed in California once again. Kristin Perry and Sandra Stier, two of the plaintiffs in Perry, were married shortly afterward at San Francisco City Hall, making them the first same-sex couple to be married in California since Proposition 8 was overturned. The officiant was the Attorney General of California, Kamala Harris.

Opponents of same-sex marriage filed an emergency petition on June 29 asking the U.S. Supreme Court to overturn the lifting of the stay issued by the Ninth Circuit. Supreme Court Justice Anthony Kennedy denied the petition on June 30.

=== Further legal challenges to the scope of the injunction barring enforcement of Proposition 8 ===
Proposition 8 proponents argued that the district court's injunction was applicable only to the two couples who were the plaintiffs in the case or, at most, applied to the two counties whose clerks were named as defendants. Attorney General Kamala Harris, however, issued an analysis that the district court's injunction applies statewide and is binding upon all 58 of California's counties based on the interpretation of California Supreme Court's decision in Lockyer v. City and County of San Francisco, stating that county clerks are state officials under supervision of the California Department of Public Health for the limited purpose of issuing marriage licenses and are thus bound by the injunction. Governor Brown then directed all county clerks to comply with district court ruling.

On July 12, 2013, Proposition 8 proponents petitioned the California Supreme Court in Hollingsworth v. O'Connell, invoking the court's original jurisdiction under Article VI of the California Constitution, asking the Supreme Court to issue a writ of mandate and an immediate stay or injunction ordering county clerks to enforce Proposition 8. Arguing that the district court lacked authority to grant relief beyond the named plaintiffs or, even if the district court had such authority, its injunction only applied to the two county clerks who were named defendants. They also argued that Article III of California Constitution prohibits administrative officials from declaring a law unconstitutional or unenforceable or refusing to enforce the law unless an appellate court has made such a determination. Since the U.S. Supreme Court's ruling in Hollingsworth v. Perry held that Proposition 8 proponents lacked legal standing to appeal the district court's decision, the decision of the Ninth Circuit was vacated with no legal effect or precedent.

The California Supreme Court ordered the parties to brief on the merits and whether the stay should be issued, and on July 15 it denied the application for a stay. On July 19, San Diego County Clerk Ernest J. Dronenburg Jr. filed a petition, Dronenburg v. Brown, asking for the California Supreme Court to halt the issuance of marriage licenses to same-sex couples, which the court denied on July 23. He later withdrew his petition on August 2. On August 14, 2013, the Supreme Court denied the petition for a writ of mandate. The last attempt to resume Proposition 8 failed and the case is now closed.

In November 2021, the Ninth Circuit agreed to release to the public unsealed videos from the Proposition 8 trial. Supporters of Proposition 8 had argued the videos should remain sealed, but the Ninth Circuit ruled that they lacked standing because they failed to show they would suffer a concrete injury if the videos were made public. The Supreme Court denied review without comment on October 11, 2022. "While it is great news that the recordings of this landmark trial have finally been made public, it never should have taken 12 years to get them unsealed.", said a spokesman for the Reporters Committee for Freedom of the Press.

== Legality of 2004 San Francisco marriages ==
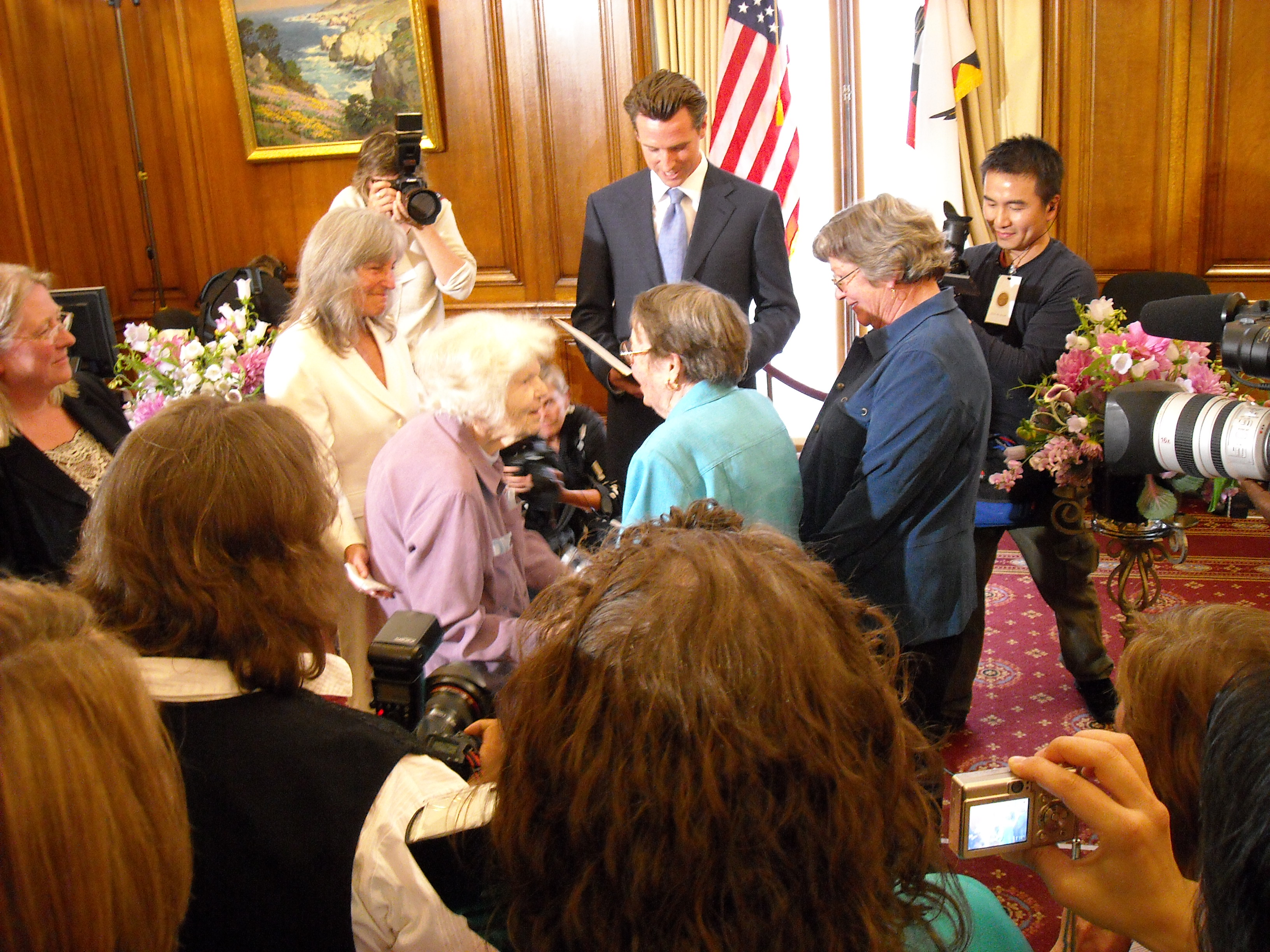
Mayor Gavin Newsom issuing the first marriage license to a same-sex couple, Del Martin and Phyllis Lyon, on February 12, 2004, San Francisco

City officials in San Francisco claimed that although the 2004 marriages were prohibited by state law, the state law was invalidated by the Equal Protection Clause. Mayor Gavin Newsom echoed this view, permitting the marriages because he believed the state law was unconstitutional. However, legislators and groups opposing same-sex marriages quickly reacted, filing a suit and requesting a court order to prevent the city from performing the ceremonies. Additionally, the California state agency that records marriages stated that altered forms, including any marriage license issued to same-sex couples, would not be registered. In Lockyer v. City and County of San Francisco, the Supreme Court ordered San Francisco to stop performing same-sex marriages pending court review on the legality of the marriages on March 11, 2004, and ultimately voided all the marriages on August 12, 2004.

Officials in Berkeley and Oakland, in nearby Alameda County, expressed interest in joining San Francisco, but were unable to do so because marriage licenses are handled at a county, rather than at a city, level. San Francisco was able to issue its own licenses because San Francisco is both a city and a county.

== Native American nations ==
California is home to hundreds of indigenous peoples, many of whom have traditions of two-spirit individuals who were born male but wore women's clothing and performed everyday household work and artistic handiwork which were regarded as belonging to the feminine sphere. This two-spirit status allowed for marriages between two biological males or two biological females to be performed among some of these tribes. Same-sex marriage is legal on the reservations of the Blue Lake Rancheria, the Colorado River Indian Tribes, and the Iipay Nation of Santa Ysabel. The latter was the first tribe in California to legalize same-sex marriage when they announced in the wake of the Perry ruling in June 2013 that they would allow same-sex couples to marry on their reservation. "Although the Tribe has certainly come far, they won't ever forget the sting of prejudice, or stand passively by when others suffer discrimination or denial of basic human rights. Native Americans have fought hard to establish and protect their own rights, and Santa Ysabel is determined to support our own, and other same sex couples in their struggle to be recognized and treated fairly as citizens of this great nation", said Virgil Perez, the tribal chairman. The Yurok Tribe has a gender-neutral marriage ordinance that defines marriage as "the union of two individuals by any ceremony or practice recognized under Yurok law, and includes marriages according to Yurok custom and tradition." The Karuk Tribe also has a gender-neutral marriage law.

=== Two-spirit marriage ===
The Luiseño, an indigenous people living from the present-day southern part of Los Angeles County to the northern part of San Diego County, have traditionally recognized two-spirit individuals who wore women's clothing and performed everyday household work and artistic handiwork which were regarded as belonging to the feminine sphere. They are known in their language as kwit (pronounced [kʷɪt]). The kwit, known as "robust workers", married cisgender men, and were sometimes wives in polygynous chieftain households.

The Mohave people of Southern California refer to two-spirit individuals who crossed out of the masculine gender as ʼalyha (pronounced [ʔəlʲˈhaː]). The ʼalyha married men and were regarded as "especially diligent wives", often sought out by shamans. They were spiritually important for the tribe as they were considered great healers, as were the hwame (pronounced [hʷaˈmeː]), individuals who were born female but wore men's clothing and performed men's activities. The hwame married women, and could claim paternity of a child if they married a pregnant woman. Living together with an ʼalyha or a hwame followed the same patterns as did the establishment and dissolution of opposite-sex marriages.

The Chumash people who live in modern-day Santa Barbara County call two-spirit people ʼaqi (pronounced [ˈʔaqi]). They "live[d] as women, and kept company with them", and married cisgender men.

The Salinan call them coya (pronounced [ˈʃo.ja]). They "lived as women, associated with them, wore the same dress [...] and enjoyed great consideration among their companions", married men, and also helped with raising young girls in the tribe. The coya were violently persecuted by Spanish colonizers, with explorer Pedro Fages ordering the execution of several coya in 1769, and they gradually disappeared with the Spanish missions in California.

Among the Yokuts of the San Joaquin Valley, two-spirit individuals are known as tonocim (pronounced [t̪oˈŋotʃim]). They were the "leaders of the mourning ceremony held immediately after the death", though would only take the "profession if they had received instructions to do so in a dream". The tonocim were spiritually important for the tribe, but generally did not marry men or women.

The Mono people call them onotim (pronounced [oˈnotim])..

The Kawaiisu call them huˀyupɨzi (pronounced [huʔjuˈpɨzi]).

The Yurok refer to two-spirit people as wergern (pronounced [wɚˈɣɚn]). They were said to have been "impelled by the desire to become shamans", a profession generally reserved to women.

In the Kashaya language, two-spirit people are known as hiʔbaya capʰya (pronounced [hiʔbaˈja ˈtʃapʰja]). They performed women's activities such as basket weaving.

Edward Winslow Gifford wrote in 1926 of a Pomo two-spirit, "Many men associated with him for short periods, some sleeping with him. None married him permanently."

The Yuki people, who live in modern-day Mendocino County, refer to two-spirit individuals as íwamusp (pronounced [ˈiːwɒmʊsp]). The íwamusp wore women's clothing, performed women's activities, were tattooed like women, and lived with and married men.

The Cahto people, who live at the head of the South Fork Eel River, call two-spirit individuals tc'eek-aaldeeltcii (pronounced [tʃʼeːkʰ aːlˈteːltʃʰiː]). They married men, and were known for their basket weaving. An anthropologist noted in 1942 that a Cahto man "may make coarse baskets without reflecting on his masculinity but a male maker of fine baskets is suspected of homosexual tendencies".

The Nomlaki, native to the Sacramento Valley, call them walusa (pronounced [ˈwaːlʊsʌ]). They reportedly "pound[ed] acorns, gather[ed] seeds, and act[ed] like women".

The Plains and Sierra Miwok refer to two-spirit individuals as ʔóš·apu (pronounced [ˈʔoʃːapu]). ʔóš·apu would marry men.

Nisenan refer to them as ʔosa·pu (pronounced [ʔoˈsaːpu]). ʔosa·pu would marry men.

Among the Shasta people, who live in present-day Siskiyou County, two-spirit individuals, known as kitúk̓uwaˑxiˀ (pronounced [kìtúk’ùwàːxìʔ]), wore women's clothing and performed the occupations of both sexes. They generally remained unmarried and lived independent lives, forming relationships with neither men nor women.

The Modoc people refer to two-spirit individuals as tʼwiniˑqʼ (pronounced [ˈt’wɪniːq’]). The tʼwiniˑqʼ wore women's clothing and "behaved as women". They married cisgender men, and usually took the role of a shaman and were credited with great spiritual power.

In the Achumawi language, they are known as yáh̓aawálu (pronounced [jə́ʜàːwə́lʊ̀]). They were said to have "special functions in connection with burial festivities", and would traditionally marry men.

Two-spirit people held a similar status and position in Atsugewi society where they are known as yah'wa (pronounced [jáːh.wˀà]).

Among the Yana people, two-spirit people had "male genitals [but] dressed like women and did all kinds of women's work. They were not ridiculed, on the other hand, they were shamans." They are known as lôya (pronounced [lɔːˈja]).

In Tolowa, two-spirit is translated as naaxe me’staa~ni (pronounced [náːxe méʔstãːni]).

Among the numerous Native American cultures of the North Coast, two-spirit individuals would generally remain unmarried.

== Demographics and marriage statistics ==
Data from the 2000 U.S. census showed that 92,138 same-sex couples were living in California. By 2005, this had increased to 107,772 couples, likely attributed to same-sex couples' growing willingness to disclose their partnerships on government surveys. Same-sex couples lived in all counties of the state, and constituted 1.4% of coupled households and 0.8% of all households in the state. Most couples lived in Los Angeles, San Francisco and San Diego counties, but the counties with the highest percentage of same-sex couples were San Francisco (2.70% of all county households) and Sonoma (1.23%). Same-sex partners in California were on average younger than opposite-sex partners, and more likely to be employed. In addition, the average and median household incomes of same-sex couples were higher than different-sex couples, but same-sex couples were far less likely to own a home than opposite-sex partners. 18% of same-sex couples in California were raising children under the age of 18, with an estimated 37,311 children living in households headed by same-sex couples in 2005.

Marriage licenses were issued to 4,037 same-sex couples in 2004 in San Francisco before the California Supreme Court issued its stay. During the same period, the San Francisco City Hall issued 103 opposite-sex marriage licenses. Of those same-sex marriage licenses issued, 82 couples either decided not to go through with a marriage or failed to register their marriage with the county before the California Supreme Court stay was issued, meaning 3,955 completed same-sex marriages were registered in the county. By reviewing the first names of the applicants, San Francisco officials estimated that 57% of the same-sex married couples were women. Demographic information gleaned from the registered licenses also showed that the newlywed same-sex couples were older: more than 74% were over age 35, while 69% had at least one college degree. According to figures released on March 17, 2004 by San Francisco County Assessor Mabel Teng, although 91.4% of the licenses were granted to couples living in California, other couples came from every state in the United States except for Maine, Mississippi, West Virginia and Wyoming. The top five states represented included 32 couples each from Washington and Oregon, 24 from Nevada, 20 from New York and 16 from Florida. International same-sex couples, 17 in all, came from Canada, Denmark, France, Germany, the Netherlands, Switzerland, Thailand, the United Kingdom and Venezuela.

== Public opinion ==
Public opinion for same-sex marriage in California
Poll source	Dates administered	Sample size	Margin of error	Support	Opposition	Don't know / refused
Public Religion Research Institute	March 9 – December 7, 2023	2,162 adults	± 0.82% ^{1}	68%	29%	3%
Public Religion Research Institute	March 11–December 14, 2022	?	?	72%	26%	2%
Public Religion Research Institute	March 8–November 9, 2021	?	?	71%	27%	2%
Public Religion Research Institute	January 7–December 20, 2020	5,415 random telephone interviewees	?	75%	22%	3%
Public Religion Research Institute	April 5–December 23, 2017	7,260 random telephone interviewees	?	66%	23%	11%
Public Religion Research Institute	May 18, 2016–January 10, 2017	9,640 random telephone interviewees	?	66%	24%	10%
Public Religion Research Institute	April 29, 2015–January 7, 2016	7,671 random telephone interviewees	?	60%	30%	9%
Edison Research	November 4, 2014	?	?	61%	35%	4%
Public Policy Institute of California	October 12–19, 2014	1,704 adult residents	± 3.5%	56%	36%	8%
New York Times/CBS News/YouGov	September 20–October 1, 2014	7,943 likely voters	± 1.6%	58%	32%	12%
Public Religion Research Institute	April 2, 2014–January 4, 2015	4,506 random telephone interviewees	?	61%	31%	8%
Public Religion Research Institute	November 12–December 18, 2013	408 random telephone interviewees	± 5.6%	59%	37%	5%
Public Policy Institute of California	September 10–17, 2013	1,703 adult residents	± 3.7%	61%	34%	5%
Public Policy Institute of California	September 10–17, 2013	1,102 likely voters	± 4.5%	64%	32%	4%
Public Policy Institute of California	May 14–20, 2013	1,704 adult residents	± 3.8%	56%	38%	6%
Public Policy Institute of California	May 14–20, 2013	1,129 likely voters	± 4.6%	59%	36%	5%
Field Poll	February 5–17, 2013	834 adults	± 4.2%	61%	32%	7%
Public Policy Institute of California	January 15–22, 2013	1,704 adult residents	± 3.5%	53%	41%	6%
Public Policy Institute of California	January 15–22, 2013	1,116 likely voters	± 4.2%	54%	40%	5%
Public Policy Institute of California	May 14–20, 2012	894 likely voters	± 3.5%	56%	37%	7%
Public Policy Institute of California	February 21–28, 2012	2,001 adult residents	± 3.4%	52%	41%	6%
Public Policy Institute of California	February 21–28, 2012	859 likely voters	± 4.2%	56%	38%	6%
Field Poll	February 2–18, 2012	1,003 adults	± 4.5%	59%	34%	7%
Public Policy Polling	November 10–13, 2011	500 voters	± 4.4%	48%	43%	9%
Public Policy Institute of California	September 6–13, 2011	2,002 adult residents	± 3.6%	53%	42%	5%
Public Policy Institute of California	September 6–13, 2011	958 likely voters	± 4.2%	53%	42%	4%
Public Policy Polling	January 28–30, 2011	892 voters	± 3.3%	51%	40%	10%
Public Policy Polling	September 14–16, 2010	630 likely voters	± 3.9%	46%	44%	10%
Field Poll	June 22–July 5, 2010	1,390 adults	± 2.8%	51%	42%	7%
Public Policy Institute of California	March 9–16, 2010	2,002 adult residents	± 2%	50%	45%	5%
Public Policy Institute of California	March 9–16, 2010	1,102 likely voters	± 3%	49%	45%	6%
Public Policy Institute of California	March 10–17, 2009	2,004 adult residents	± 2%	44%	49%	7%
Public Policy Institute of California	March 10–17, 2009	987 likely voters	± 3%	45%	49%	6%
Field Poll	February 20–March 1, 2009	761 adults	± 3.6%	49%	44%	7%
Public Policy Institute of California	November 5–16, 2008	2,003 adult residents	± 2%	47%	48%	5%
Public Policy Institute of California	October 12–19, 2008	2,004 adult residents	± 2%	44%	50%	6%
Public Policy Institute of California	August 12–19, 2008	2,001 adult residents	± 2%	45%	48%	7%
Public Policy Institute of California	August 12–19, 2008	1,047 likely voters	± 3%	47%	47%	6%
Field Poll	May 17–26, 2008	1,052 adults	± 3.2%	51%	42%	7%
Public Policy Institute of California	June 12–19, 2007	2,003 adult residents	± 2%	45%	49%	6%
Public Policy Institute of California	June 12–19, 2007	983 likely voters	± 3%	46%	48%	6%
Public Policy Institute of California	September 13–20, 2006	2,003 adult residents	± 2%	44%	48%	8%
Public Policy Institute of California	September 13–20, 2006	1091 likely voters	± 3%	47%	46%	7%
Field Poll	February 12–26, 2006	1,000 adults	± 3.2%	43%	51%	6%
Field Poll	2006	?	?	44%	50%	6%
Public Policy Institute of California	August 8–15, 2005	2,004 adult residents	± 2%	44%	48%	8%
Public Policy Institute of California	August 8–15, 2005	988 likely voters	± 3%	46%	46%	8%
Field Poll	May 18–24, 2004	745 adults	± 5.2%	43%	53%	4%
Field Poll	February 18–22, 2004	958 adults	± 3.3%	44%	50%	6%
Public Policy Institute of California	February 8–16, 2004	2,004 adult residents	± 2%	44%	50%	6%
Public Policy Institute of California	February 8–16, 2004	1,013 likely voters	± 3%	43%	51%	6%
Field Poll	August 10–13, 2003	1,036 adults	± 5.8%	42%	50%	8%
Public Policy Institute of California	January 2–10, 2000	1,031 likely voters	± 3.5%	38%	55%	7%
Field Poll	February 11–17, 1997	1,045 adults	± 3.3%	38%	56%	6%
Field Poll	1997	?	?	39%	55%	6%
Field Poll	1985	?	?	30%	62%	8%
Field Poll	1977	?	?	28%	59%	13%

Notes:

- ^{1} 95% level of confidence, including the design effect for the survey of 1.56%

== Timeline ==
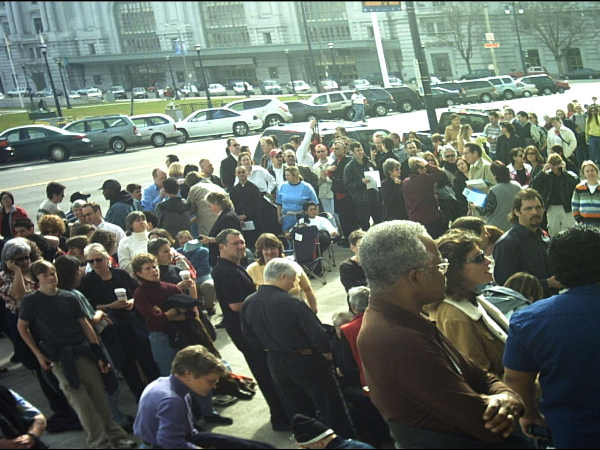
Same-sex couples gather at San Francisco City Hall during the Valentine's Day weekend in 2004 to apply for marriage licenses.

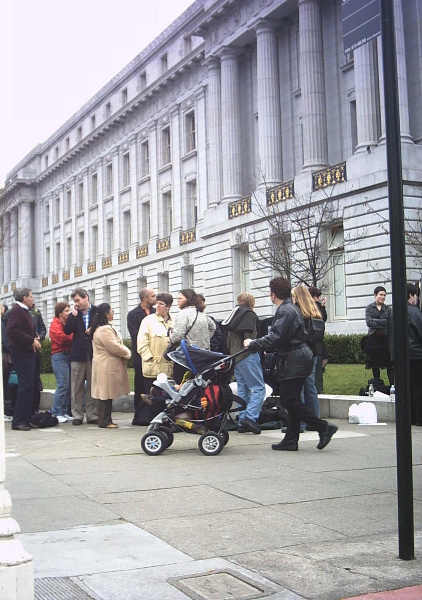
The line of same-sex couples applying for marriage licenses stretched for blocks around San Francisco City Hall in February 2004.

- February 12, 2004: Mayor Gavin Newsom and other city officials began issuing marriage licenses in San Francisco. Del Martin and Phyllis Lyon were the first same-sex couple to be married. The event was intended to undercut a legal challenge planned by the Campaign for California Families (CCF).
- March 9, 2004: The San Jose City Council, by a vote of 8–1, agreed to recognize same-sex marriages performed in other jurisdictions for city employees.
- March 11, 2004: The Supreme Court of California issued a stay ordering San Francisco to stop performing same-sex marriages pending court review on the legality of the matter. Mayor Newsom agreed to abide by the order. The ruling did not alter a scheduled March 29 San Francisco Superior Court hearing before Judge Ronald Quidachay in which the Campaign for California Families and the Alliance Defense Fund claimed that San Francisco's granting of same-sex marriage licenses was illegal. Quidachay later delayed the hearing pending action by the California Supreme Court.
- May 25, 2004: The California Supreme Court held hearings on the legality of the marriages. San Francisco had wanted its case heard first by lower courts rather than by the state Supreme Court. However, the court suggested that San Francisco could file its own suit against the state, and the city launched such a suit that afternoon.
- August 12, 2004: The state Supreme Court released its decision, exactly six months after the first same-sex marriages were performed in San Francisco. The court ruled unanimously that San Francisco had exceeded its authority and violated state law by issuing the marriage licenses. In a 5–2 decision, the court also declared all same-sex marriages performed in San Francisco to be void, while expressing no opinion on the constitutionality of marriage restrictions.
- March 14, 2005: In the case of In re Marriage Cases, Judge Richard Kramer of the San Francisco County Superior Court ruled that California's ban on same-sex marriage was unconstitutional.
- May 15, 2008: The California Supreme Court released its decision in In re Marriage Cases, applying strict scrutiny to the state's discrimination between heterosexual and homosexual citizens. Marriage was found to be a fundamental right that may not be denied based on sexual orientation, and the relevant laws were struck down.
- June 16, 2008: Same-sex marriage became legal in California. Counties started issuing marriage licenses to same-sex couples during regular hours on June 17.
- November 4, 2008: Proposition 8 was passed by California voters. Same-sex marriages were no longer legal from November 5, 2008.
- May 23, 2009: Perry v. Schwarzenegger was filed in the U.S. District Court for the Northern District of California to challenge the validity of Proposition 8 on behalf of two same-sex couples.
- May 26, 2009: The California Supreme Court upheld Proposition 8 in Strauss v. Horton, but did not overturn previous same-sex marriages.
- August 4, 2010: U.S. District Judge Vaughn Walker declared the ban unconstitutional but stayed his ruling pending appeal.
- August 5, 2010: Both sides submitted legal briefs to Judge Walker arguing for or against a long-term stay of the ruling.
- August 7, 2010: Governor Arnold Schwarzenegger, who had vetoed same-sex marriage legislation on two earlier occasions, and Attorney General Jerry Brown, both filed motions with Judge Walker, urging him not to stay his ruling any longer. Lawyers representing Schwarzenegger wrote, "The Administration believes the public interest is best served by permitting the court's judgment to go into effect, thereby restoring the right of same-sex couples to marry in California."
- August 12, 2010: Judge Walker scheduled to lift his stay for same-sex marriages to resume during the appeals process, but instead issued a stay until August 18 to allow opponents to file an appeal with the Ninth Circuit Court of Appeals.
- November 17, 2011: The California Supreme Court ruled, in Perry v. Brown, that sponsors of Proposition 8 have the right to defend the initiative in court, allowing the case to be heard in the Ninth Circuit.
- February 7, 2012: A three-judge panel of the Ninth Circuit ruled, 2–1, that the ban on same-sex marriage in California was unconstitutional. The court stayed its decision pending an expected appeal.
- June 5, 2012: A request for an en banc rehearing of the Ninth Circuit decision was denied.
- July 31, 2012: Proponents of Proposition 8 filed a petition for a writ of certiorari in the U.S. Supreme Court, seeking review of the Ninth Circuit's decision.
- December 7, 2012: The U.S. Supreme Court agreed to hear challenges to the Ninth Circuit's finding that Proposition 8 was unconstitutional.
- June 26, 2013: The U.S. Supreme Court ruled the appellants lacked legal standing under federal law. It ordered the Ninth Circuit to void their ruling, leaving Walker's decision standing. The Supreme Court also overturned Section 3 of the federal Defense of Marriage Act in United States v. Windsor that same day.
- June 28, 2013: The Ninth Circuit lifted its stay, allowing same-sex marriages to proceed in California. Governor Jerry Brown instructed all California county clerks to immediately begin issuing marriage licenses, and the first same-sex marriages since 2008 were performed.
- June 29, 2013: Opponents of same-sex marriage filed an emergency petition asking the U.S. Supreme Court to overturn the lifting of the stay issued by the Ninth Circuit.
- June 30, 2013: Supreme Court Justice Anthony Kennedy denied the petition.
- July 12, 2013: Proposition 8 supporters petitioned the California Supreme Court to order enforcement of Proposition 8 in the majority of the state's counties, arguing that Judge Walker had no jurisdiction to bar statewide enforcement, that his decision was binding only with respect to either the specific couples involved, or just the two counties in which those couples resided. They argued that California law requires continued enforcement until a ruling of an appeals court, and that of the Ninth Circuit decision had been vacated by the U.S. Supreme Court.
- July 15, 2013: The California Supreme Court declined to immediately halt same-sex marriages in response to the July 12 petition but announced it would hear briefs on the merits of the argument.
- July 19, 2013: San Diego County Clerk Ernest J. Dronenburg Jr. petitioned the California Supreme Count to immediately halt same-sex marriages based on arguments similar to those of the July 12 petition.
- July 23, 2013: The California Supreme Court declined to immediately halt same-sex marriages in response to the July 19 petition.
- August 2, 2013: The petition in Dronenburg v. Brown to halt same-sex marriages filed on July 19 was withdrawn.
- August 14, 2013: In a one-page order, the California Supreme Court denied a writ of mandate on the July 12 petition without comment, rejecting the last legal challenge to same-sex marriage in California.

== See also ==
- 8, a play about the Proposition 8 trial
- 8: The Mormon Proposition, a documentary that examines the Church of Jesus Christ of Latter-day Saints and its support of Proposition 8
- LGBT rights in California
- Obergefell v. Hodges
- Pursuit of Equality, a documentary about the struggle for same-sex marriage
- Same-sex marriage in the United States
