= Richard Kramer (judge) =

American judge (born 1947)

Richard A. Kramer (born Boston, Massachusetts, July 22, 1947) is a judge serving on the San Francisco County Superior Court. He is most known for his 2005 ruling striking down Proposition 22, a California ballot initiative defining marriage as only valid when between a man and a woman.

== Education and career ==
Kramer received a Bachelor of Arts degree in political science in 1969, graduating magna cum laude. He was graduated from the University of Southern California Law School in 1972 as a Doctor of Jurisprudence.

Kramer worked as civil litigator representing the banking industry. He was appointed to the San Francisco County Superior Court by California Governor Pete Wilson in 1996. Kramer has been recognized for his ability to handle many complex cases, leading to California's Judicial Council to appoint him as the same-sex "Marriage Cases" coordinator.

== Marriage case and response ==
Kramer made headlines in March 2005 when he struck down Proposition 22, a California ballot initiative defining marriage as between a man and a woman. on the grounds that it denies the "basic human right to marry a person of one's choice." In his decision, he pointed out the "obvious natural and social reality that one does not have to be married in order to procreate, nor does one have to procreate in order to be married" and that "California's enactment of rights for same-sex couples belies any argument that the State would have a legitimate interest in denying marriage", concluding that "there is no rational state interest in denying them the rites of marriage as well."

According to a San Francisco Chronicle news article. "A crucial point of the ruling was the judge's conclusion that the marriage law amounts to sex discrimination, a finding that is enough to overturn virtually any California law under the state's strict constitutional standard." The law makes "the gender of the intended spouse... the sole determining factor" of the legality of a marriage, Kramer said; he said claims by the law's defenders that the law treats men and women equally were no more valid than earlier claims that anti-interracial marriage laws treated whites and blacks equally."

The decision was not put into legal effect during the appeals process. California governor Arnold Schwarzenegger supported the status quo of domestic partnership rights, but said that he would abide by the California Supreme Court's decision and not push any constitutional amendment to override the courts.

Kramer, in the words of a National Review editorial, "[F]inds the law's definition of marriage as the union of a man and a woman not just wrong or outdated but irrational... He has never heard of a possible reason to regard marriage as a male-female union. That view of marriage... cannot survive even the lowest level of scrutiny a judge can bring to bear on a statute." National Review argued that "This kind of pseudo-rationalism would undermine any marriage law at all" because not all marriages fulfill the roles for which they were designed. The magazine considered the decision to be anti-democratic judicial activism. "There is no plausible argument that any provision of the state constitution was originally understood to require same-sex marriage," argues the editorial.

Political commentator Andrew Sullivan conceded that the decision was judicial activism, with which he is somewhat uncomfortable. Nevertheless, he applauded the decision in his blog, noting:

[W]hen state constitutions insist upon it, you have to have a much stronger argument to keep a minority disenfranchised than the current anti-marriage forces have been able to marshal. Tradition? So was the ban on inter-racial marriage. Procreation? Non-procreative straight couples can get civil licenses. The potential collapse of civilization? Impossible to prove or even argue convincingly. Once you have accepted that there is no moral difference between homosexuality and heterosexuality, the arguments against same-sex marriage collapse. And since the only coherent moral difference is the likelihood of non-procreative sex, and that is now the norm in traditional heterosexual civil marriage, there is no moral case against allowing gay couples to have civil marriage. The rest is fear and prejudice and religious conviction. None should have a place as a legal argument in the courts

Sullivan also noted: "Kramer is not a radical. He's a Catholic Republican appointed by a former Republican governor." Finally, Sullivan counters the argument that the decision undermines all marriage law thus:

No one is using any of these actual, not-always-present aspects of civil marriage to deny anyone's right to marry. No one, so far as I know, is saying that we should bar couples from civil marriages because they are not in love or not cohabiting or any other criterion. But they are saying that couples [that] do not or cannot procreate should be barred from marriage - on those grounds alone. All Kramer is saying is that current marriage laws have no such exception, and that using that exception to exclude one group of non-procreative couples (the gay ones) rather than another non-procreative group (the straight ones) makes no logical sense. Especially when many lesbian (and some gay ones) marriages have biological children, and some straight ones have adopted kids.

In 2008, after the California Supreme Court reversed the appeal which had overturned Kramer's decision, essentially upholding Kramer's original decision but on different grounds, Kramer officiated some of the first same-sex weddings in San Francisco.

== See also ==
- Same-sex marriage
- Same-sex marriage in California
