= Strauss v. Horton =

2009 California Supreme Court case

- Supreme Court of California

Argued March 5, 2009 Decided May 26, 2009
- Full case name: Karen L. Strauss et al., Petitioners, v. Mark B. Horton et al.
- Citation(s): 46 Cal.4th 364; 93 Cal.Rptr.3d 591; 207 P.3d 48

Holding
- The Amendment to the State Constitution referred to as Proposition 8 is valid and enforceable from the moment it was passed. It cannot be applied to retroactively annul marriages that were transacted while the practice was legal in the State of California.

Court membership
- Chief Justice: Ronald M. George
- Associate Justices: Marvin R. Baxter Ming W. Chin • Carol A. Corrigan Joyce L. Kennard • Carlos R. Moreno Kathryn Mickle Werdegar

Case opinions
- Majority: George, joined by Kennard, Baxter, Chin, Corrigan
- Concurrence: Kennard
- Concurrence: Werdegar
- Concur/dissent: Moreno

Strauss v. Horton, 46 Cal. 4th 364, 93 Cal. Rptr. 3d 591, 207 P.3d 48 (2009), was a decision of the Supreme Court of California, the state's highest court. It resulted from lawsuits that challenged the voters' adoption of Proposition 8 on November 4, 2008, which amended the Constitution of California to outlaw same-sex marriage. Several gay couples and governmental entities filed the lawsuits in California state trial courts. The Supreme Court of California agreed to hear appeals in three of the cases and consolidated them so they would be considered and decided. The supreme court heard oral argument in the cases in San Francisco on March 5, 2009. Justice Kathryn Mickle Werdegar stated that the cases will set precedent in California because "no previous case had presented the question of whether [a ballot] initiative could be used to take away fundamental rights".

The court announced its decision on May 26, 2009. The decision held that Proposition 8 was valid as adopted by the voters, but that marriages performed before Proposition 8 went into effect would remain valid. On June 26, 2013, Strauss v. Horton was mooted by Hollingsworth v. Perry.

== Background ==
On November 13, 2008, the California Supreme Court asked state Attorney General Jerry Brown to reply by November 17, 2008, to a number of lawsuits challenging the voter-approved ban on same-sex marriage. The filing the court requested from the Attorney General was not to address the ballot measure's validity, but to focus on whether the justices should accept the suits for review and whether Proposition 8 should be suspended while they decide the case, said Christopher Krueger, a senior assistant attorney general.

On November 17, 2008, the Attorney General urged the court to hear these cases in order to decide the important legal issues presented, but also argued that the court should not suspend Proposition 8.

On November 19, 2008, the California Supreme Court accepted three lawsuits (Strauss et al. v. Horton, Tyler et al. v. State of California et al., and City and County of San Francisco et al. v. Horton et al.) challenging Proposition 8 and said that it would hear the cases together, but denied the requests to stay its enforcement. Three additional lawsuits (Asian Pacific American Legal Center et al. v. Horton et al., Equal Rights Advocates and California Women's Law Center v. Horton et al., and California Council of Churches et al. v. Horton et al.) on the matter were denied hearing, but those petitioners were invited by the court to file amicus briefs in the cases which were accepted.

== Issues ==
=== Whether Proposition 8 is a revision ===
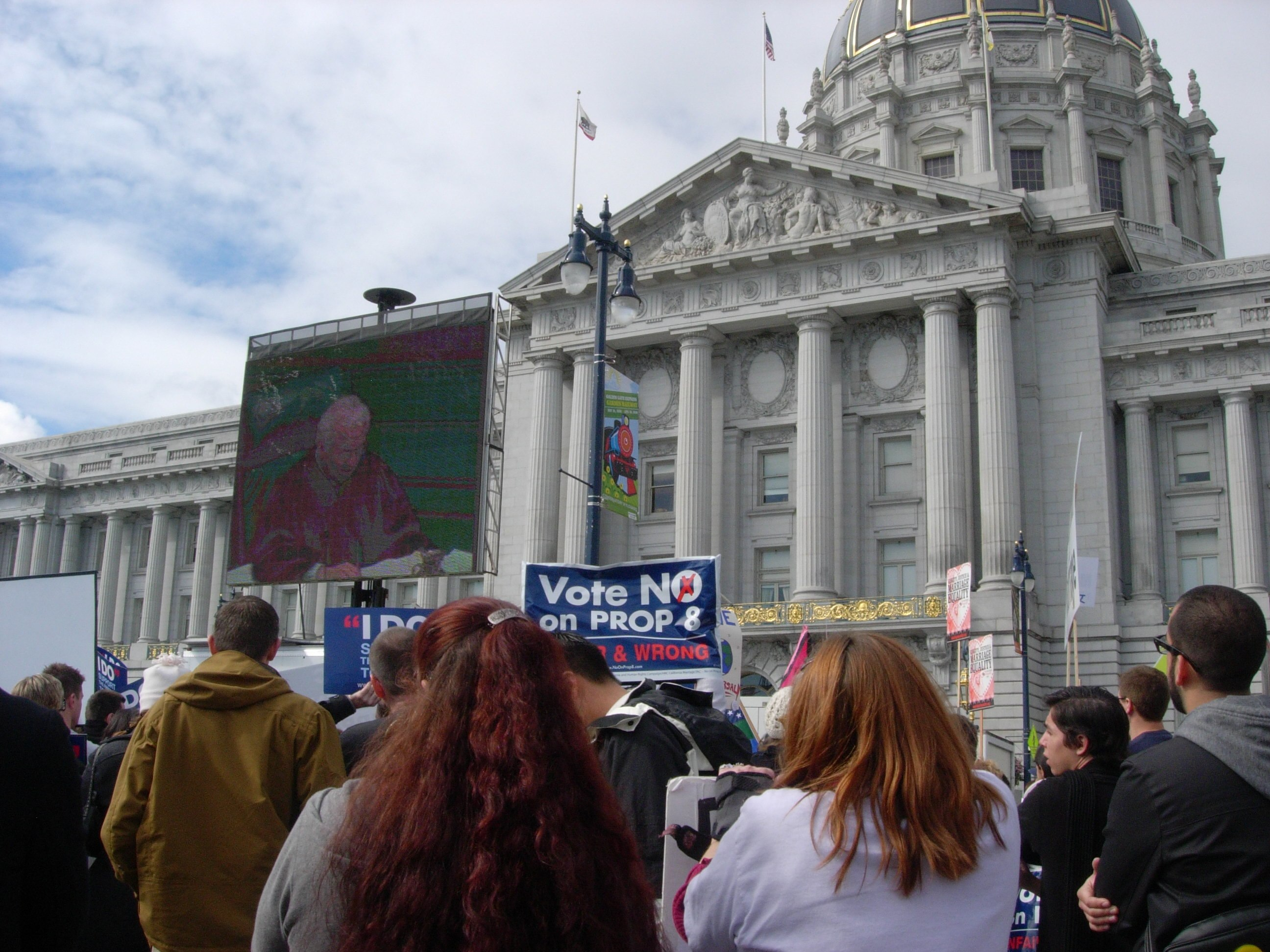
A crowd of onlookers watch the jumbo screen as Justice Carlos R. Moreno, the sole dissenting justice, asks questions.

The lawsuits claimed that revoking the right of same-sex couples to marry is a constitutional revision rather than an amendment. In California, both constitutional amendments and revisions require that a majority of voters approve the ballot initiative. However, a revision, defined as a "substantial alteration of the entire constitution rather than to a less extensive change in one or more of its provisions," also requires the prior approval of 2/3 of each house of the California State Legislature.

Erwin Chemerinsky, the dean of the law school at the University of California, Irvine, stated, "the California Supreme Court has never articulated criteria for what makes something an amendment versus a revision. So I don't think you can predict anything because there is so little law."

Claims made on similar grounds with respect to other constitutional changes have in some cases taken years to be adjudicated, and almost all have failed. Kenji Yoshino, an openly gay man who serves as the Chief Justice Earl Warren Professor of Constitutional Law at New York University School of Law, cast doubt on the "revision" argument, stating that "for both precedential and political reasons, I think this case is a loser."

=== Whether Proposition 8 violates separation of powers ===
Like the United States Constitution, the California Constitution employs the concept of separation of powers. The lawsuits argue that the protection of minority groups via the Constitution and the Bill of Rights is inherently a judiciary function, which cannot be overturned by the legislative branch of government, and therefore cannot be overturned by the initiative-amendment process.

=== Whether Proposition 8 invalidates existing marriages ===
A pending legal issue was whether the approximately 18,000 same-sex marriages already in effect would be retroactively annulled by the constitutional change or whether they would be preserved, since the amendment does not state explicitly that it would nullify same-sex marriages performed before the change took effect. California Attorney General Jerry Brown said that existing same-sex marriages would be unaffected, but other legal experts were uncertain. On December 19, 2008, supporters of Prop. 8 filed briefs responding to each of the anti-Prop. 8 lawsuits already filed with the State Supreme Court and seeking to nullify same-sex marriages already in effect.

=== Whether voters can override inalienable rights ===
The Attorney General's response to the lawsuits included a new argument that the Court should overturn Proposition 8. That brief contends that California's initiative-amendment process does not give voters the right to overturn rights in California's Declaration of Rights without a "compelling justification".

== Involved parties ==
=== Petitioners ===
Plaintiffs in the three lawsuits included same-sex couples who had married or planned to marry, represented by the same legal team that argued and won In re Marriage Cases, Lambda Legal, the National Center for Lesbian Rights, and the ACLU of Northern California, as well as the cities of San Francisco and Los Angeles, and the county of Santa Clara. The Los Angeles County Board of Supervisors voted to join the lawsuit filed by the City of Los Angeles, San Francisco, and Santa Clara County, the four becoming the first governmental entities in the United States to sue for marriage equality for homosexual couples. This lawsuit was subsequently joined by Alameda, Marin, San Mateo and Santa Cruz counties, and the cities of Fremont, Laguna Beach, Oakland, San Diego, Santa Cruz, Santa Monica and Sebastopol. The petitioners were represented by San Francisco City Attorney Therese M. Stewart.

=== Respondents ===
The Article 1 provision guaranteeing basic liberty, which includes the right to marry, took precedence over the initiative. Based on my duty to defend the law and the entire Constitution, I concluded the court should protect the right to marry even in the face of the 52 percent vote.

-- Attorney General Jerry Brown

As the respondents in these cases were the State of California and some of its officials in their official capacity, California Attorney General Jerry Brown and his office were the primary individuals charged with responding to the lawsuit. Other respondents include Mark B. Horton of the State Registrar of Vital Statistics and Linette Scott of the California Department of Public Health.

On December 19, 2008, the Attorney General's office filed its response, whose final section supported overturning Proposition 8. The brief argued that:

1. Although Proposition 8 should not be overturned on the grounds of revision/amendment analysis or on separation-of-power grounds as proposed in the original lawsuits,
2. Proposition 8 should not, if upheld, overturn existing same-sex marriages performed in California, and
3. Proposition 8 should be "stricken as inconsistent with the guarantees of individual liberty safeguarded by article I, section 1 of the Constitution."

In discussing the last section of the answer brief, the Attorney General explained, "Proposition 8 violates constitutionally protected liberties. There are certain rights that are not to be subject to popular votes, otherwise they are not fundamental rights. If every fundamental liberty can be stripped away by a majority vote, then it's not a fundamental liberty."

According to the San Jose Mercury News, Brown's argument for overturning Proposition 8 left Proposition 8 supporters legally isolated because the Attorney General would normally defend existing state laws. Brown responded to this noting that the California Constitution also constitutes existing state law.

=== Intervenors ===
ProtectMarriage.com, the sponsors of Proposition 8, asked for permission to intervene in the cases. On November 19, 2008, the Court granted permission for them to do so.

The Campaign for California Families, a conservative religious organization, also asked the court for permission to become an official party to all three cases. The group unsuccessfully sought to place a same-sex marriage ban on the November ballot that also would have denied domestic partner benefits to same-sex couples. Represented by the Florida-based Liberty Counsel, the Campaign said in its motion to intervene that state officials would not adequately defend the rights of voters. On November 19, 2008, the Court denied permission for CCF to intervene in the cases.

On December 19, 2008, the official proponents of Proposition 8 filed briefs responding to each of the anti-Prop. 8 lawsuits already filed with the court, seeking to uphold the validity of Proposition 8 against the lawsuits and nullify same-sex marriages already in effect. Kenneth Starr, dean of Pepperdine University School of Law and Whitewater controversy independent counsel, joined the Proposition 8 legal defence team that same day.

=== Amici ===
By January 19, 2009, sixty amicus curiae letters had been sent to the Court and posted on the Court's web site, 43 in opposition to all or part of Proposition 8, 17 in support.

Forty-four members of the California Legislature (about one-third of its membership) filed an amicus curiae brief in support of one of the three lawsuits. The Anti-Defamation League, the Bar Association of San Francisco, and three other legal or civil rights groups also submitted letters supporting efforts to get the court to delay implementation of Proposition 8.

== Oral arguments ==
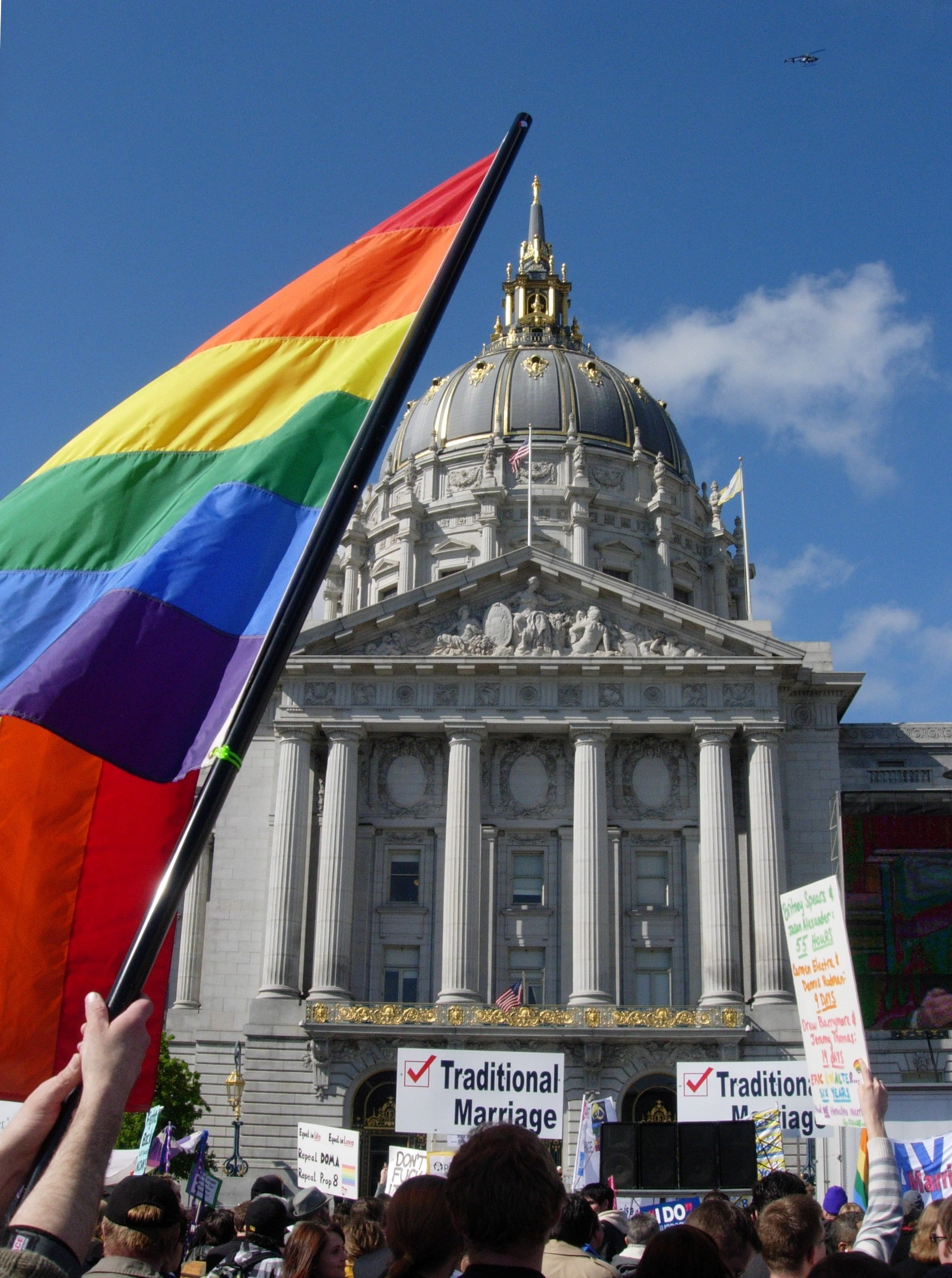
Pro and Anti-Proposition 8 protesters clash at a rally in front of San Francisco City Hall.

Oral arguments took place on March 5, 2009, at the Supreme Court's headquarters in San Francisco, while thousands from both sides protested outside. A television screen had been set up, displaying live shots from the proceedings within the court.

Kenneth Starr, lawyer for ProtectMarriage.com, argued that "Prop. 8 was a modest measure that left the rights of same-sex couples undisturbed under California's domestic-partner laws and other statutes banning discrimination based on sexual orientation," to the agreement of most of the judges. Chief Justice Ronald M. George, however, said, "It is just too easy to amend the California Constitution." Starr's argument was challenged in and out of court by two members of his own faculty who argued the court had an obligation to secure both equality and religious freedom, and majorities cannot assume to have the power to deprive minorities of fundamental rights.

The main issue which arose during the oral argument included the meaning of the word "inalienable", and to which extent this word goes when used in Article I of the Californian Constitution. Christopher Krueger of the Attorney General's office said that inalienable rights may not be stripped away by the initiative process. Those claims were rebuffed by Attorney Kenneth Starr, who said, "rights are important, but they don't go to structure. ... rights are ultimately defined by the people."

== Decision ==
The Supreme Court reported on May 22 that it would reach a verdict on the validity of Proposition 8 and the 18,000 same-sex marriages in question on Tuesday, May 26 at 10:00am. Because of the Memorial Day holiday, the court released its opinion on a Tuesday instead of Monday, as is traditional.

=== Majority opinion ===
On May 26, 2009 the California Supreme Court reported its decision on the validity of Proposition 8 and the 18,000 same-sex marriages in question. The proposition was upheld, but existing marriages were allowed to stand. Both the majority and Justice Werdegard emphasized that the ruling applied specifically to the use of the designation "Marriage", and that the ruling left the domestic partnership institution as well as several protections from In re Marriage Cases completely unaffected. The majority opinion stated:

The Attorney General's contention ... rests inaccurately upon an overstatement of the effect of Proposition 8 on both the fundamental constitutional right of privacy guaranteed by article I, section 1, and on the due process and equal protection guarantees of article I, section 7. As explained below, Proposition 8 does not abrogate any of these state constitutional rights, but instead carves out a narrow exception applicable only to access to the designation of the term "marriage," but not to any other of "the core set of basic substantive legal rights and attributes traditionally associated with marriage . . .

The majority also noted that "Proposition 8 must be understood as creating a limited exception to the state equal protection clause."

=== Concurrence ===
Justices Kennard and Werdegar filed concurring opinions. Kennard noted primarily that whereas "interpretation" of the law is a Judicial power, "alteration" is not, and as the proposal altered the language to be interpreted, it could not possibly violate the separation of powers. Werdegar considered that much of the argumentation of the majority regarding the difference between a "revision" and an "amendment" was flawed, expressing specific concern that the ruling "gives the foundational principles of social organization in free societies, such as equal protection, less protection from hasty, unconsidered change than principles of governmental organization."

=== Dissent ===
Justice Moreno's dissent agreed with the petitioners' contention that "requiring discrimination against a minority group on the basis of a suspect classification strikes at the core of the promise of equality that underlies our California Constitution" and thus should be considered a revision.

Citing Varnum v. Brien, Moreno stated that "equal protection principles lie at the core of the California Constitution and have been embodied in that document from its inception," and that "As a logical matter, [the equal protection clause] cannot depend on the will of the majority for its enforcement, for it is the will of the majority against which the equal protection clause is designed to protect." He concurred with the majority over the fact that the 18,000 valid marriages before Proposition 8 would remain (thus, Proposition 8 is not retroactive), as well as concurring with the majority opinion that "Proposition 8 does not entirely repeal or abrogate a same-sex couple's substantive state constitutional right to marry as set forth in the Marriage Cases." Despite this, he dissented on the major question at issue and stated that Proposition 8 was indeed a constitutional revision that required a two-thirds legislative vote, citing article 18 of the California Constitution and the history of the constitutional provisions for amendments and revisions.

== Demonstrations and events ==
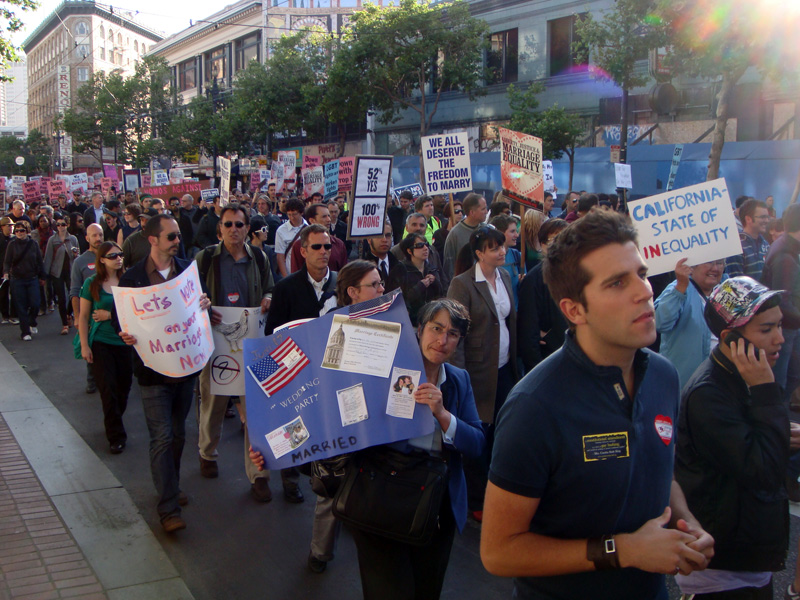
Protestors at the "Day of Decision" rally marched up Market St in downtown San Francisco following the Supreme Court ruling.

While oral arguments were ongoing within the court house in San Francisco, protests took place outside, with both sides sharing their views.

On March 2, 2009, the California State Senate passed a resolution opposing Proposition 8, saying that "the initiative is a fundamental revision to the document, not an amendment, and therefore required deliberation by the Legislature and a two-thirds vote of both houses to put it on the ballot." The California State Assembly passed an essentially identical resolution the same day.

On May 8, a "Meet in the Middle" march and rally took place in Fresno in an effort to sway Central California voters to support same-sex marriage, because they had "voted overwhelmingly for the ban".

"Day of Decision" protests or celebrations by supporters of same-sex marriage were planned for the evening of May 26, 2009, following the scheduled release of the Supreme Court decision; these events will take place across California, as well as in major cities in the United States and Canada. San Francisco City Attorney, Dennis Herrera, said that while it he was disappointed by the court's decision, it shows that the final round "could not be won in the legal arena". He vowed to fight in the ballot box in 2010.

Proposition 8 supporters also planned to respond to the court ruling with public gatherings; Fresno pastor Jim Franklin, a leading opponent of same-sex marriage, opined that "if it were to go against the people, then there really should be rioting in the streets."

== See also ==
- Perry v. Schwarzenegger, a federal case challenging Proposition 8 and launched the day of the Strauss v. Horton decision
- For a review of Strauss v. Horton, see: Thomas Kupka, Names and Designations in Law, in: The Journal Jurisprudence 6 (2010) 121-130.
