= Campaign for California Families =

California-based Non-Profit Organization

Campaign for California Families is a non-profit organization promoting socially conservative public policy in California, founded by Randy Thomasson, who also founded the Campaign for Children and Families. Campaign for California Families is best known for its successful effort to pass California's Proposition 22, which prohibited same-sex marriage before that measure was overturned by the decision in In re Marriage Cases in 2008. It also unsuccessfully attempted to legally intervene in the consolidated Strauss v. Horton case and in Perry v. Schwarzenegger.
