= 2000 California Proposition 22 =

Referendum banning same-sex marriage

Proposition 22
- March 7, 2000
- Limit on Marriage

Results
Choice	Votes	%
For	4,618,673	61.35%
Against	2,909,370	38.65%
Valid votes	7,528,043	95.51%
Invalid or blank votes	353,956	4.49%
Total votes	7,881,999	100.00%
Registered voters/turnout	14,631,805	51.45%
County results
Yes
50%–60%
60%–70%
70%–80%
80%–90%
No
50%–60%
60%–70%

Proposition 22 was a law enacted by California voters in March 2000 stating that marriage was between one man and one woman. The Act was proposed by means of the initiative process and was authored by state Senator William J. Knight, and is known informally as the Knight initiative. Voters adopted the measure on March 7, 2000, with 61% in favor to 39% against. The margin of victory surprised many, since a Field Poll immediately prior to the election estimated support at 53%, with 40% against and 7% undecided.

The Act added Section 308.5 of the Family Code, which read "Only marriage between a man and a woman is valid or recognized in California". Because the Act was an ordinary statute, it could be struck down if it were inconsistent with the state constitution, as happened on May 15, 2008, when the state supreme court, ruling in In re Marriage Cases, declared that same-sex couples had a constitutional right to marry. This 4–3 decision invalidated Proposition 22 and some related California laws.

Proposition 22 provoked debate long after its passage. In November 2008, California voters overturned the In re Marriage Cases decision by approving an amendment of the state constitution called Proposition 8. In June 2010, Proposition 8 was declared unconstitutional by U.S. district judge Vaughn Walker based on the Due Process and Equal Protection clauses of the Fourteenth Amendment of the United States Constitution. In June 2013, the United States Supreme Court in Hollingsworth v. Perry ruled that the Intervenor-Defendants had no Article III standing to appeal Walker's ruling, keeping Proposition 8 unenforceable throughout California and enabling same-sex marriage to resume just two days after the decision.

== Statutory framework ==
Prior to 1977, marriage was defined in Section 4100 of the California Civil Code. This stated that marriage is "a personal relation arising out of a civil contract, to which consent of the parties making that contract is necessary". While related sections of the law made references to sex, a State Assembly committee that was debating adding sex-specific terms to this section in 1977 noted: "Under existing law it is not clear whether partners of the same sex can get married". That year, the legislature amended the legal definition of marriage to remove any ambiguity. In 1992 the legal definition of marriage was moved from the Civil Code to Section 300 of the Family Code.

When Proposition 22 came before voters, marriage was defined in the Family Code as "a personal relation arising out of a civil contract between a man and a woman, to which the consent of the parties capable of making that contract is necessary" [italics added]. Even though the definition governing who may marry explicitly precluded contracting a same-sex marriage in California, a separate provision, Section 308, governed recognition of marriages contracted elsewhere. This stated that a "marriage contracted outside this state that would be valid by the laws of the jurisdiction in which the marriage was contracted is valid in this state". Advocates of Proposition 22 described Section 308 as a "loophole", apparently forcing California to recognize a same-sex marriage validly contracted in some other state.

To address this, Proposition 22 did not reword the existing provisions of the Family Code, but added to them the declaration that "only marriage between a man and a woman is valid or recognized in California". The official citation of Proposition 22, the "California Defense of Marriage Act", is almost the same as that of a federal law, the Defense of Marriage Act, which was enacted by Congress in 1996. This federal law had a similar purpose, and was intended to prevent any state from being obligated to recognize a same-sex marriage contracted in another state.

== Results of vote ==
Proposition 22
Choice	Votes	%
For	4,618,673	61.35
Against	2,909,370	38.65
Total	7,528,043	100.00
Valid votes	7,528,043	95.51
Invalid/blank votes	353,956	4.49
Total votes	7,881,999	100.00
Registered voters/turnout	14,631,805	53.87
Source: March 2000 Complete Statement of Vote

== Disputes over its effect ==
Central to many subsequent disputes over Prop 22's effect is a distinction between statutes enacted by the legislature and initiative statutes enacted directly by the electorate. The legislature is free to amend or rescind its own enactments, but voters must approve any attempt by the legislature to amend or repeal an initiative statute unless the initiative itself states otherwise.

=== Controversy over domestic partnerships ===
In 1999, California enacted the first in a series of domestic partnership provisions. California courts have entertained several challenges to legislative expansions of the domestic partnership scheme enacted after Prop 22. Generally, these challenges alleged that the legislature inappropriately amended Prop 22 by making California's domestic partnership scheme too similar to marriage, or more broadly, that Prop 22 made 'any' subsequent recognition of same-sex partnerships beyond the legislature's inherent power. California Courts of Appeal rejected those claims, noting that domestic partnerships already existed as a legal institution separate from marriage at the time Prop 22 was enacted.

=== Controversy over marriage licensing within California ===
In September 2005, the California legislature passed a bill, A.B. 849, eliminating the gender requirements for marriage now found in Family Code section 300. Governor Arnold Schwarzenegger vetoed the bill. In his veto message, Schwarzenegger argued that passing a law that would implicitly repeal Section 308.5 required the assent of the electorate (and separately made note of pending court challenges). In ruling on the disputes between Prop 22 and the domestic partnership enactments, California Courts of Appeal have reached differing conclusions as to Prop 22's scope within the marriage statutes.

In Armijo v. Miles, the Second Appellate District Distinguished Prop 22 from the case at bar by noting, in part, that the initiative prevented the recognition of same-sex marriages conducted outside California:

The legislative analysis and the ballot arguments readily demonstrate that Proposition 22 was crafted with a prophylactic purpose in mind. It was designed to prevent same-sex couples who could marry validly in other countries or who in the future could marry validly in other states from coming to California and claiming, in reliance on Family Code section 308, that their marriages must be recognized as valid marriages. With the passage of Proposition 22, then, only opposite-sex marriages validly contracted outside this state will be recognized as valid in California.

The Armijo court may not have ruled that the historical purpose of Prop 22 limited its scope to out of state marriages. The court appears to have ultimately presumed that Proposition 22 did indeed apply to in-state arrangements deemed to be "marriages," but held that the challenged wrongful death statute did not violate that prohibition:

The question remaining is whether the portion of AB 2580 that amends the wrongful death statute subverts Proposition 22. Defendants' position that it does is based on the faulty premise that the right to sue for wrongful death is an exclusive benefit of marriage. It is not.

Less than a week later, on April 4, 2005, the Third Appellate District ruled more explicitly, in Knight v. Superior Court, that Prop 22 also included within the initiative's ambit marriages licensed within the state:

The plain language of Proposition 22 and its initiative statute, section 308.5, reaffirms the definition of marriage in section 300, by stating that only marriage between a man and a woman shall be valid and recognized in California. This limitation ensures that California will not legitimize or recognize same-sex marriages from other jurisdictions, as it otherwise would be required to do pursuant to section 308, and that California will not permit same-sex partners to validly marry within the state.

As with Armijo, the Knight court upheld the challenged statute on the grounds that it did not constitute a "marriage" for purposes of Prop 22 or Section 300. The cases differed, however, in that Armijo appeared to rely on a narrow observation that a particular benefit was not exclusive to marriage, while Knight upheld a broad domestic partnership statute against challenges it left almost no substantive difference between the two institutions. Parties in subsequent cases, including the same-sex marriage cases, have noted the apparent split between the appellate courts with respect to its scope.

As the ultimate rulings in these cases arguably did not require a finding that Prop 22 applies to in-state marriages (both were upheld against a challenge that they constituted marriage under Prop 22, the same result that would have obtained if they had ruled Prop 22 did not apply to in-state marriages), some argue that these findings are dicta. On the flip side, an argument can be made that these holdings are not dicta, as both courts ruled on the merits of whether or not a challenged in-state arrangement constituted a "marriage" for purposes of Prop 22, an allegation that would be moot if either court believed Prop 22 permitted in-state marriages. In 2008, the California Supreme Court resolved the controversy in ruling on the constitutionality of statutes limiting marriage to a man and a woman: "this provision reasonably must be interpreted to apply both to marriages performed in California and those performed in other jurisdictions."

== Invalidation ==
Separately, numerous challenges to the constitutionality of the opposite-sex requirements found in California's marriage statutes, including Prop 22, came before the courts. A San Francisco trial court threw out all of the gender requirements on state constitutional grounds. On appeal, an intermediate court reversed that decision. In December 2006, the California Supreme Court voted unanimously to review all six cases and held oral argument on March 4, 2008, consolidating the cases as In re Marriage Cases. The Court ruled on May 15, 2008, that Proposition 22 violated the state Constitution and was therefore invalid. Governor Arnold Schwarzenegger immediately issued a statement pledging to uphold the ruling, and repeated his pledge to oppose Proposition 8, a constitutional amendment initiative that would override the Court's ruling and again ban same sex marriages by placing the text of Proposition 22 in the State Constitution. Proposition 22 has been officially repealed, effective January 1, 2015, following the signature of SB 1306 on July 7, 2014 by Governor Jerry Brown.

== See also ==
- Proposition 8
- Domestic partnership in California
- Same-sex marriage in California
- Same-sex marriage in the United States
- U.S. state constitutional amendments banning same-sex unions
- Defense of Marriage Act (U.S.)
- Federal Marriage Amendment
- Marriage Protection Act of 2007
- LGBT movements in the United States
- William "Pete" Knight
- David Lane (activist)
