= Table of years in LGBTQ rights =

Lesbian, gay, bisexual, transgender, queer rights by time period
1700s - 1800s - 1900–1949 - 1950s - 1960s - 1970s - 2010s - 2020s
1970	1971	1972	1973	1974	1975	1976	1977	1978	1979
1980	1981	1982	1983	1984	1985	1986	1987	1988	1989
1990	1991	1992	1993	1994	1995	1996	1997	1998	1999
2000	2001	2002	2003	2004	2005	2006	2007	2008	2009
2010	2011	2012	2013	2014	2015	2016	2017	2018	2019
2020	2021	2022	2023	2024	2025	2026			

== See also ==
- LGBTQ rights by country or territory — current legal status around the world
- LGBTQ social movements — historical and contemporary movements
- List of LGBTQ firsts by year
- Timeline of LGBTQ history
