= National Bisexual Liberation Group =

American bisexual rights advocacy organization

- Founded: February 1972
- Location: New York City, New York

National Bisexual Liberation Group was a bisexual rights advocacy organization formed in 1972 in New York City and active in the 1970s.

== Formation ==
National Bisexual Liberation Group was founded in New York City in February 1972 by Don Fass, a New York psychotherapist.

By winter of 1975, the organization claimed it had more than 5,500 members in ten chapters across the United States, 800 members in their New York City chapter, and that more than 4,000 people had attended their New York City events.

== Activities ==
The organization had chapters around the United States, published a newsletter, and advocated on bisexual rights.

In 1974–1975, the organization held monthly parties and weekly group meetings. The organization also hosted occasional brunches and coffee socials.

=== The Bisexual Expression ===
The organization published a newsletter, The Bisexual Expression, considered by some to be the earliest newsletter specifically for the bisexual community in the United States.

== See also ==
- Bisexuality in the United States
