= 1986 in LGBTQ rights =

This is a list of notable events in the history of LGBT rights that took place in the year 1986.

== Events ==
- In New Zealand, the Homosexual Law Reform Act equalizes the age of consent for homosexual acts to 16, the legal age for heterosexual acts. The law was signed by the governor-general July 11, and came into effect August 8.
- Davis, California, prohibits employment discrimination based on sexual orientation in the private sector.
- Sacramento, California, prohibits employment discrimination based on sexual orientation in the private sector.
- ILGA hosts conferences in Japan as well as Denmark.

=== March ===
- 20 — New York City passes its first anti-discrimination bill.

=== June ===
- 30 — The Supreme Court of the United States upholds the constitutionality of the Georgia state sodomy law in Bowers v. Hardwick.

=== July ===
- 7 — The United States Supreme Court denies certiorari in the case of Baker v. Wade, a constitutional challenge to the sodomy law of Texas.

=== October ===
- 22 — In the battle against AIDS, Surgeon General of the United States C. Everett Koop, publishes the first government publications for the public on gay safer sex practices.

=== December ===
- 11 — Austin, Texas, passes an ordinance that prohibits discrimination against people with HIV or AIDS.

== Deaths ==
- December 28 — Terry Dolan, U.S. activist against gay rights and closeted gay man, dies at 36 from an AIDS-related illness.

== See also ==
- Timeline of LGBT history — timeline of events from 12,000 BCE to present
- LGBT rights by country or territory — current legal status around the world
- LGBT social movements
