= 2006 in LGBTQ rights =

This is a list of notable events in the history of LGBTQ rights that took place in the year 2006.

== Events ==
=== January ===
- 1
  - Serbia equalizes the age of consent for homosexual acts to 14, matching the legal age for heterosexual acts.
  - In the U.S. state of Illinois, a new state law prohibiting discrimination on the basis of sexual orientation goes into effect.
  - In the U.S. state of Washington, a new mayor of Spokane is sworn in to succeed James E. West, who was recalled after a political scandal involving him using his office computer to access gay websites.
- 24 – Republic of Ireland – Report of Oireachtas committee recommending civil unions is launched by Taoiseach Bertie Ahern.
- 25 – The Ocean County, New Jersey freeholders vote to allow county police and fire department employees to designate someone other than a spouse as a pension beneficiary. The move comes after the case of Laurel Hester, a police officer with the Ocean County prosecutor's office with terminal cancer, came to national attention when the freeholders refuse repeatedly to change the spouses-only rule.
- 26 – In the Czech Republic, registered partnership legislation is approved by the Senate 65–14.
- 27 – In the U.S. state of Washington, legislators pass a bill banning discrimination on the basis of sexual orientation (which is legally defined to include gender identity). It passes with a 25–23 vote in the state senate and by a 61–37 vote in the House of Representatives. State governor Christine Gregoire says she will sign the bill into law on January 31.

=== March ===
- 8 – The city council of Washington, D.C., bans gender identity discrimination in the private sector.
- 15 – The Czech Republic’s Chamber of Deputies overrides president Václav Klaus's veto of the registered partnerships bill.

=== April ===
- 11 – Ernie Fletcher, governor of the U.S. state of Kentucky, rescinds a 2003 executive order banning discrimination based on sexual orientation or gender identity in the public sector.

=== May ===
- 27 – An attempt to stage the first-ever gay pride march in Moscow ends with violence and mass arrests, after activists took to the streets despite the ban by mayor Yuri Luzhkov.

=== June ===
- 5 – United States President George W. Bush renews his call for passage of the Federal Marriage Amendment.
- 7
  - The Federal Marriage Amendment fails to pass the U.S. Senate. Of the 60 votes required to invoke the cloture motion, 49 senators voted to put the amendment to a vote and 48 voted against.
  - Anti-discrimination law in the state of Washington enters into effect, after a ballot initiative to reverse it fails to collect enough signatures.
- 29 – The Supreme Court of the U.S. state of Arkansas confirms a lower state court judgment, ruling that it is unconstitutional to ban lesbians and gays from being foster parents.

=== July ===
- 1 – Registered partnerships begin in the Czech Republic, the first nation of the former Communist bloc to sanction same-sex unions.
- 23 – Registered partnerships begin in Slovenia.
- 29 – the Declaration of Montreal on LGBT (lesbian, gay, bisexual, transgender) Human Rights is presented at the opening ceremony of the 2006 World Outgames.

=== August ===
- 2 – the Legislative Assembly of Amazonas, in Brazil, approves Law No. 3,079, which prohibits discrimination based on sexual orientation and gender identity.

=== September ===
- 10 – Canada's New Democratic Party becomes the world's first political party to adopt the Declaration of Montreal.
- 11 – Responding to pressure from the American Medical Student Association, the Gay and Lesbian Medical Association and other groups, Touro University reinstates the medical school's Gay-Straight Alliance student group.
- 29 – The Anglican Journal reports that Terence Finlay, retired Archbishop of Toronto and Metropolitan of Ontario, has solemnised the marriage of a lesbian couple—and that Finlay's successor, Colin Johnson, has suspended his license to conduct weddings.

=== October ===
- 16 – The government of Hong Kong accepts the decision of the appeals court to equalise the age of consent from 21 (for homosexual acts) to 16 (the legal age for heterosexual acts).
- 25 – The New Jersey Supreme Court rules in a 4–3 decision that the state constitution guarantees same-sex couples all the legal benefits of marriage, but does not explicitly legalize same-sex marriage in the state.
- 26 – 29 – The tenth-annual ILGA-Europe conference is held in Sofia, on the eve of Bulgaria's accession to the European Union in 2007.

=== November ===
- 7
  - Eight states vote on amendments to ban same-sex marriage: Arizona, Colorado, Idaho, South Carolina, South Dakota, Tennessee, Virginia and Wisconsin. All of the bans pass except for Arizona, which defeats the measure.
  - Patricia Todd, the first openly gay member of the Alabama legislature, is elected.
- 8 – The UK Government publishes regulations outlawing discrimination in Goods and Services covering Northern Ireland which are due to enter into force on the January 1, which prove controversial with some religious groups
- 9 – Mexico City's unicameral Legislative Assembly passed and approved (43–17) a bill legalizing same-sex civil unions, under the name Ley de Sociedades de Convivencia (Law for Co-existence Partnerships), which became effective in March 2007.
- 9 – Yogyakarta Principles was developed at a meeting of the International Commission of Jurists, the International Service for Human Rights and human rights experts from around the world at Gadjah Mada University on Java, Indonesia from 6 to 9 November 2006.
- 14 – The National Assembly of South Africa passes the Civil Union Bill, which will legalise same-sex marriage in South Africa, by 230 votes to 41.
- 23 – Days before same-sex marriage becomes legal, the Constitutional Court of South Africa rules in Gory v Kolver NO that a same-sex partner is entitled to inherit as a spouse would if the other partner dies intestate.
- 29 – Having been passed 36–11 by the National Council of Provinces of South Africa on the previous day, the Civil Union Act is signed into law by Acting President Phumzile Mlambo-Ngcuka. The first South African same-sex marriage is solemnised on the following day.

=== December ===
- 1 – An equalised age of consent law comes into force in Isle of Man, reducing the legal age for homosexual activity from 18 to 16 to match the age for heterosexual activity.
- 7
  - The House of Commons of Canada defeats a motion put forward by the Conservative minority government to revisit the issue of same-sex marriage in Canada. After the motion fails, prime minister Stephen Harper tells reporters, "I don't see reopening this question in the future."
  - The Scottish Parliament legalizes adoption by same-sex couples, by a vote of 98–11.
- 11 – Three LGBT organisations—ILGA-Europe, LBL, and LSVD—are granted United Nations ECOSOC consultative status after a hard fought campaign from many non-governmental organizations.
- 14
  - The New Jersey Legislature enacts a bill to establish civil unions in that state. The measure passed 56–19 in the Assembly, and 23–12 in the Senate. It will come into effect 60 days after the governor signs it.
  - In the Republic of Ireland, the Labour party introduces a civil unions bill in the Dáil, to be debated in early 2007.
- 19 – New Jersey bans gender identity discrimination in the private sector.
- 21 – New Jersey governor Jon Corzine signs the bill establishing civil unions in the state. The first civil union licenses become available on February 20, 2007.

== Deaths ==
- January 30 – Coretta Scott King, 78, American civil rights activist and advocate of gay rights
- February 18 – Laurel Hester, 49, American police officer whose fight to name her domestic partner as her pension beneficiary garnered national attention
- May 24 – Fritz Klein, 73, American bisexual sex researcher and psychiatrist
- July 3 – Nimrod Ping, 58, British gay architect and politician
- October 14 – Gerry Studds, 69, American Representative for the state of Massachusetts, first openly gay member of Congress

== See also ==
- Timeline of LGBTQ history – timeline of events from 12,000 BCE to present
- LGBTQ rights by country or territory – current legal status around the world
- LGBTQ social movements
