= EqualityMaine =

LBGTQ organization in Maine, United States

- The EqualityMaine logo

- U.S. State of Maine
- Founded: 1984
- Type: 501(c)(4)
- Tax ID no.: 01-0491854
- Location: Portland, Maine
- Region served: Maine
- Key people: Gia Drew, executive director
- Revenue: $427,717 (2017)
- Employees: 6
- Website: equalitymaine.org
- Formerly called: Maine Lesbian/Gay Political Alliance

EqualityMaine (formerly the Maine Lesbian/Gay Political Alliance) is Maine's oldest and largest lesbian, gay, bisexual, transgender, and queer (LGBTQ) political advocacy organization. Their mission, outlined on the organization's website is to "secure equality for lesbian, gay, bisexual, and transgender people in Maine through political action, community organizing, education, and collaboration."

EqualityMaine consists of three organizational branches: EqualityMaine Foundation, a 501(c)(3) organization that focuses on educational programs in its efforts, EqualityMaine, a 501(c)(4) organization that uses electoral programs, and EqualityMaine Political Action Committee, a political action committee that endorses campaigns who advocate for equality in regards to LGBTQ Mainers and supports legislation that allow for fair treatment and equality.

== History ==
EqualityMaine was founded as the Maine Lesbian/Gay Political Alliance (MLGPA) in 1984, following the murder of Charlie Howard. The organization is the oldest and largest lesbian, gay, bisexual, transgender, and queer (LGBTQ) organization in the state. In 2008, they were a primary opponent of an attempt to revoke an anti-discrimination law in Maine. In 2009, EqualityMaine was one of the main supporters of a push to recognize same-sex marriage in Maine.

On June 30, 2011, EqualityMaine and Gay & Lesbian Advocates & Defenders (GLAD) announced plans to place a voter initiative in support of same-sex marriage on the state's November 2012 ballot. After leading the effort to gather the signatures necessary for a citizen's initiative, EqualityMaine was among the lead groups of the Maine Freedom to Marry Coalition, the group that led the effort to win the right to marry for same-sex couples in Maine.

In July 2013, EqualityMaine announced a new, five-year strategic plan. That new strategic plan focuses the organization's work on issues that affect LGBTQ youth, elders, and people living in rural Maine.

EqualityMaine's past executive director was Betsy Smith. In December 2013, Elise Johansen was named the new director of EqualityMaine. She had moved to Maine from Florida shortly after Maine had legalized same-sex marriage. Johansen replaced Betsy Smith, who had stepped down from her position as executive director.

In the Maine gubernatorial election in 2014, EqualityMaine backed Michael Michaud, an openly gay candidate who served 11 terms in the Maine Legislature and six terms in Congress. Ali Vander Zanden, the political director for EqualityMaine, stated "[Michaud] has been a stalwart supporter of equal rights for all Mainers."

EqualityMaine has worked with the Human Rights Commission of Maine in order to make changes to driver's licenses in Maine. On May 10, 2018, Maine became the third state to offer a non-binary option listed on driver's licenses after Oregon and California. The new system started with a sticker on the back of IDs and driver's licenses, but will then be updated by July 2019 to replace the letter M or F with the letter X instead.

== Operations ==
Currently, EqualityMaine has four full-time staff members, a board of directors, and several part-time consultants. The organization is sponsored by several local businesses, including Hannaford Brothers Company, Coffee By Design, Idexx Laboratories, and WEX Inc. as well as both national and local banks. EqualityMaine operates out of the Equality Community Center in Portland, Maine and maintains an active social media presence that broadcasts upcoming events related to LGBTQ causes.

The organization is a member of the Equality Federation.

== See also ==
- LGBTQ rights in Maine
- Same-sex marriage in Maine
- List of LGBTQ rights organizations
- Matt Moonen, former director
