= 1982 in LGBTQ rights =

This is a list of notable events in the history of LGBT rights that took place in the year 1982.

== Events ==
=== February ===
- 17 — A Pennsylvania judge rules that two people of the same sex cannot enter into a common-law marriage.
- 25
  - Wisconsin becomes the first U.S. state to ban anti-gay discrimination. It would be nine years before any other state enacted such a statute.
  - A three-judge panel of the United States Court of Appeals for the Ninth Circuit affirms the lower court ruling in Adams v. Howerton that the marriage of Australian Anthony Sullivan and Richard Adams, under a license issued by Boulder County, Colorado, in 1975, is not valid for purposes of Sullivan's immigration.

=== April ===
- 2 — The United Nations Human Rights Committee, in the case Hertzberg et al. v. Finland, refuses to "question the decision of the responsible organs of the Finnish Broadcasting Corporation that radio and TV are not the appropriate forums to discuss issues related to homosexuality, as far as a programme could be judged as encouraging homosexual behaviour".

=== June ===
- 28 — The Supreme Court of the United States denies certiorari in the case of Adams v. Howerton.

=== July ===
- 12 — France removes homosexuality from its official list of mental illnesses.

=== August ===
- 17 — United States district court Judge Jerry Buchmeyer rules in Baker v. Wade that the sodomy law of the state of Texas violates the right to privacy and due process.

=== October ===
- 25 — Northern Ireland decriminalizes consensual homosexual acts between adults, the last jurisdiction within the United Kingdom to do so.

=== December ===
- 11 — San Francisco mayor Dianne Feinstein vetoes a domestic partnership bill.

== See also ==
- Timeline of LGBT history — timeline of events from 12,000 BCE to present
- LGBT rights by country or territory — current legal status around the world
- LGBT social movements
