= 1985 in LGBTQ rights =

This is a list of notable events in the history of LGBT rights that took place in the year 1985.

== Events ==
- France prohibits discrimination based on lifestyle ("moeurs"), including homosexuality, in employment and services, public and private.

=== March ===
- 26 — The Supreme Court of the United States, being divided 4—4, affirms the ruling of the Tenth Circuit Court of Appeals which struck down an Oklahoma state law allowing teachers to be fired for "advocating, soliciting, imposing, encouraging or promoting public or private homosexual activity in a manner that creates a substantial risk that such conduct will come to the attention of school children or school employees". The appellate court found that the law infringed on First Amendment guarantees of free speech.

=== April ===
- 1
  - Harvey Milk High School holds its first classes in New York City.
  - Governor Toney Anaya of New Mexico issues an executive order banning public-sector sexual orientation discrimination.

=== May ===
- 12 — The first memorial to the LGBT victims of the Nazis, a pink granite stone monument at the former Neuengamme concentration camp inscribed "Dedicated to the Homosexual victims of National Socialism, 1985", is unveiled.
- 21 — The United States Court of Appeals for the Eleventh Circuit in Hardwick v. Bowers strikes down the state of Georgia's sodomy law as unconstitutional.

=== August ===
- 26 — The United States Court of Appeals for the Fifth Circuit reverses the lower court in Baker v. Wade, finding no constitutional violation in the sodomy law of Texas. Two months later the Court refused plaintiff Donald Baker's request for a rehearing.

=== September ===
- 30 — A three-judge panel of the United States Court of Appeals for the Ninth Circuit, in a 2—1 opinion written by Anthony Kennedy, affirms in the case of Adams v. Howerton that the Immigration and Naturalization Service did not abuse its authority when it refused to recognize the marriage of Australian Anthony Sullivan and Richard Adams, under a license issued by Boulder County, Colorado, in 1975, for purposes of Sullivan's immigration. The couple leave the United States but eventually return, with Sullivan living as an illegal alien.

=== October ===
- 4 — First openly gay member of parliament elected in West Germany.
- 8 — Austin Latino/a Lesbian and Gay Organization (ALLGO) is formed in Austin, Texas.
- 9 — New York City mayor Ed Koch asks the American Legion's Veterans Day parade to allow gay veterans to march. He is ignored.
- 21 — Dan White, assassin of Harvey Milk and San Francisco mayor George Moscone, dies by suicide.

=== November ===
- 5 — San Francisco extends anti-discrimination protection to people with AIDS.
- 13 — Margaret Roff is elected mayor of Manchester, becoming the first openly lesbian mayor in the United Kingdom.

=== December ===
- 24 — Governor Booth Gardner of Washington issues an executive order banning public-sector sexual orientation discrimination.

== See also ==
- Timeline of LGBT history — timeline of events from 12,000 BCE to present
- LGBT rights by country or territory — current legal status around the world
- LGBT social movements
