= 2002 in LGBTQ rights =

This is a list of notable events in the history of LGBTQ rights that took place in the year 2002.

== Events ==
- Sweden legalizes adoption for same-sex couples, making Sweden's registered partnership nearly identical to marriage, with the exception of the right to marriage in a church.
- US state of New York bans sexual orientation discrimination in the private sector.
- Tony Knowles, governor of the U.S. state of Alaska, issues an executive order banning sexual orientation discrimination in the public sector.

=== April ===
- 28 – Homosexuality is decriminalized in the People's Republic of China, as the newly amended Marriage Law avoids this topic.

=== May ===
- 6 – Openly gay Dutch politician Pim Fortuyn is assassinated by Volkert van der Graaf.
- 10 – In Marc Hall v. Durham Catholic School Board, Canadian gay teenager Marc Hall wins an injunction permitting him to bring his boyfriend to his prom.
- 17 – In Germany, the Bundestag passes a supplement to the Act of Abolition of National Socialism (NS-Aufhebungsgesetzes), vacating Nazi-era convictions of homosexuals.

=== July ===
- The United Nations Human Rights Committee in case Joslin et al. v. New Zealand concludes that ICCPR does not foresee a right to same-sex marriage.
- 25 – In Satchwell v President of the Republic of South Africa, the Constitutional Court of South Africa rules that the same-sex partner of a High Court judge is entitled to the same financial benefits that the spouse of a judge would receive.

=== August ===
- Austria's Article 209 of the Penal Code was removed equalising the age of consent at 14.

=== September ===
- 4 – In Hungary, the Constitutional Court repeals §199 of the penal code, equalising the age of consent for both heterosexual and homosexual activity at 14.
- 10 – In Du Toit v Minister of Welfare and Population Development, the Constitutional Court of South Africa rules that same-sex couples must be allowed to adopt children jointly.
- 22 – In Switzerland, voters in the canton of Zurich vote 63% to 37% to give same-sex couples the same legal rights as married opposite-sex couples. This includes tax, inheritance, and social security benefits. These rights are only given to same-sex couples who live in Zurich canton and who register with the government, promising to live together and support each other for six months.

=== October ===
- 18 – In South Africa, in the case of Fourie v Minister of Home Affairs, the Transvaal Provincial Division of the High Court dismisses an application by a lesbian couple to require the government to recognise their partnership as a marriage. The decision is appealed to the Supreme Court of Appeal.

== Deaths ==
- October 24 – Harry Hay, 90, leader in the early gay rights movement in the United States, co-founder of the Mattachine Society and the Radical Faeries.

== See also ==
- Timeline of LGBT history – timeline of events from 12,000 BCE to present
- LGBT rights by country or territory – current legal status around the world
- LGBT social movements
