= 1983 in LGBTQ rights =

This is a list of notable events in the history of LGBT rights that took place in the year 1983.

== Events ==
=== February ===
- In the 1983 by-election for the Bermondsey constituency in South London, Labour candidate Peter Tatchell loses a previously safe seat after a campaign dominated by attacks on his left-wing politics and homosexuality.

=== October ===
- 3 – In the United States, the AFL–CIO labor union votes to support gay rights legislation.

=== November ===
- 18 – New York governor Mario Cuomo signs an executive order banning public sexual orientation discrimination.

=== December ===
- 30 – Ohio governor Richard Celeste issues Executive Order 83-64, which prohibits discrimination in state employment on the basis of sexual orientation.

== See also ==
- Timeline of LGBT history – timeline of events from 12,000 BCE to present
- LGBT rights by country or territory – current legal status around the world
- LGBT social movements
