= 1974 in LGBTQ rights =

This is a list of notable events in the history of LGBT rights that took place in the year 1974.

== Events ==
- The city of Boulder, Colorado enacts an anti-discrimination ordinance that bars discrimination based on sexual preference. Following public outcry, the city council places a repeal measure up for a public vote, which results in the repeal of the ordinance.
- Dublin, Ireland and Oslo, Norway both hold gay pride demonstrations or something similar.
- The Netherlands allowed LGBT individuals to serve in the military.

=== January ===
- 1 - Ohio repealed its sodomy and solicitation laws.
- 11 — L'Association homophile de Montreal holds first meeting.
- 15 — New York City theatre magazine After Dark bans the use of the word "gay" in advertisements.
- 19 — The Gay Women's Collective holds two-day lesbian conference at Montreal's women's centre.

=== February ===
- 11 — Richard North and Chris Vogel become first couple known to be married by the Unitarian Universalist Church. The Government of Canada refuses to recognize their marriage.

=== April ===
- 2 - Kathy Kozachenko is the first openly gay person to be elected to political office in the U.S., having been elected to the Ann Arbor City Council in Michigan.

=== October ===
- 16 - In both South Africa and Namibia, a person can legally change their gender but surgery is required.

=== November ===
- 5 — Elaine Noble becomes the first openly gay or lesbian individual to be elected to a state legislature in the U.S. when she is elected to the Massachusetts House of Representatives.

=== December ===
- 9 — Allan Spear, a state senator in the U.S. state of Minnesota, comes out as gay.

== See also ==
- Timeline of LGBT history — timeline of events from 12,000 BCE to present
- LGBT rights by country or territory — current legal status around the world
- LGBT social movements
