= 1987 in LGBTQ rights =

This is a list of notable events in the history of LGBT rights that took place in the year 1987.

== Events ==
- Radical AIDS activist group, the AIDS Coalition to Unleash Power (ACT UP), organizes in New York City.
- Cathedral City, California, prohibits employment discrimination based on sexual orientation in the private sector.

=== May ===
- 29 — Barney Frank, United States Congressman for Massachusetts's 4th congressional district since 1981, comes out as gay in an interview with The Boston Globe.

=== June ===
- 25 — In San Francisco Arts & Athletics, Inc. v. United States Olympic Committee the United States Supreme Court rules that the Gay Games may not use the word "Olympic" in its name because of the trademark held by the USOC.

=== September ===
- 5 — The Homomonument, a memorial to LGBT victims of the Nazis, is dedicated at Amsterdam, Netherlands.

=== October ===
- Governor Neil Goldschmidt(D) of Oregon issues an executive order banning sexual orientation discrimination in state employment.
- 1 — The Minnesota Supreme Court refuses to rule on the constitutionality of the state's anti-sodomy law, allowing the law to remain on the books.
- 11 — The Second National March on Washington for Lesbian and Gay Rights takes place with an estimated 200,000 participants. The march, demonstration, and rally also included the first public display of Cleve Jones's NAMES Project AIDS Memorial Quilt and the first community wedding. The 200,000 person estimate, widely quoted from the New York Times, was made several hours before the march actually began; similarly, most of the pictures used by mainstream media were taken early in the morning, or of the AIDS Quilt viewing area rather than the march itself. Police on the scene estimated numbers during the actual march to be closer to half a million. This event and date would also be the starting point for what would become National Coming Out Day.

=== November ===
- 3 — Boulder, Colorado, citizens pass the first referendum to ban discrimination based on sexual orientation.

=== December ===
- 8 — David Wilshire, British Member of Parliament, introduces Section 28 as an amendment to the Local Government Bill.

== Deaths ==
- July 11 — Tom Waddell, physician, decathlete representing the United States at the 1968 Summer Olympic Games, founder of the Gay Games.
- August 24 — Bayard Rustin, 75, U.S. civil rights activist, widely acknowledged as the person responsible for the 1963 March on Washington, and a gay rights activist in his later life.

== See also ==
- Timeline of LGBT history — timeline of events from 12,000 BCE to present
- LGBT rights by country or territory — current legal status around the world
- LGBT social movements
