= 1993 in LGBTQ rights =

This is a list of notable events in the history of LGBT rights that took place in the year 1993.

== Events ==
- Sodomy laws in the Republic of Ireland are repealed.
- Minnesota bans private-sector discrimination based on sexual orientation and gender identity, becoming the first U.S. state to enact a law addressing transgender civil rights.

=== January ===
- 15 – In U.S. state of Colorado, district court judge Jeffrey Bayless issues a temporary injunction in Romer v. Evans, preventing Amendment 2 from becoming part of the state constitution.

=== April ===
- 25 – Third gay rights march on Washington, D.C., the March on Washington for Lesbian, Gay and Bi Equal Rights and Liberation draws an estimated 1,000,000 participants.
- 29 - Russia decriminalized homosexual relationships.

=== May ===
- 5 – In Baehr v. Lewin, the Hawaii Supreme Court rules that denying marriage licenses to same-sex couples constitutes discrimination based on sex under the Hawaii Constitution. The court remands the case to the trial court to determine whether the state had a "compelling" state interest in barring such marriages.

=== July ===
- 19 – Colorado's Supreme Court upholds an injunction issued by a district court in January against Amendment 2 and sends it back to the district court to be scrutinized.

=== August ===
- 10 - New Zealand passes their Human Rights Act.

=== September ===
- 19 – The Hamilton Square Baptist Church protests break out in San Francisco.

=== October ===
- 1 – A court orders the federal government of Canada to grant a gay federal worker spousal and bereavement benefits equal to those heterosexual employees receive.
- 7 – In the United States, the AFL–CIO labor union passes a resolution to oppose the repeal of gay rights laws.

=== November ===
- 2 – Voters in Cincinnati, Ohio, and Lewiston, Maine, repeal bans on discrimination based on homosexual orientation.
- 30 – Don't Ask, Don't Tell, Don't Pursue, Don't Harass policy goes into effect in the United States armed forces.

=== December ===
- 3 – The state senate of Massachusetts passes a bill that protects the civil rights of lesbian and gay students in public schools.
- 14 – In Colorado, district court judge Jeffrey Bayless rules Amendment 2 unconstitutional.

== See also ==
- Timeline of LGBT history – timeline of events from 12,000 BCE to present
- LGBT rights by country or territory – current legal status around the world
- LGBT social movements
