= 1991 in LGBTQ rights =

This is a list of notable events in the history of LGBT rights that took place in the year 1991.

== Events ==
- U.S. state of Connecticut bans sexual orientation discrimination in the private sector.
- U.S. state of Hawaii bans sexual orientation discrimination in the private sector.

=== January ===
- 29 — Minnesota governor Arne Carlson issues an executive order banning sexual orientation discrimination in the public sector.

=== April ===
- 16 — The United Kingdom Department of Health issued guidance banning social workers from allowing gay couples to become foster parents.

=== May ===
- 1 — Three same-sex couples file suit in Hawaii alleging that the state constitution guarantees their right to marry.
- 19 — The Executive Council of Hong Kong votes to decriminalize homosexuality.

=== August ===
- 16 — New Jersey governor James Florio issues an executive order prohibiting sexual orientation discrimination in the public sector.

=== December ===
- 17 — The Minnesota Court of Appeals, overturning a lower court ruling in In re Guardianship of Kowalski, awards guardianship of Sharon Kowalski, brain-damaged in an accident eight years earlier, to her lesbian partner Karen Thompson.

== See also ==
- Timeline of LGBT history — timeline of events from 12,000 BCE to present
- LGBT rights by country or territory — current legal status around the world
- LGBT social movements
