= 1980 in LGBTQ rights =

This is a list of notable events in the history of LGBT rights that took place in the year 1980.

== Events ==
- New York (in People v. Onofre) and Pennsylvania (in Commonwealth v. Bonadio) become the first U.S. states to hold same-sex sodomy laws unconstitutional. No other state's highest court will do so again until the Kentucky Supreme Court issues its holding in Kentucky v. Wasson in 1992.

=== January ===
- 23 - Serving openly in the Colombian military becomes legal, however Sentence T-099 of the Colombian Supreme Court exempts trans women from serving.

=== February ===
- 1 - Gay Asians of Toronto is founded by Richard Fung.

=== June ===
- 2 - The Canadian Union of Postal Workers ratify a federal government document that includes a no-discrimination clause protecting sexual orientation.
- 3 — Voters in San Jose and Santa Clara County, California, vote to repeal the city and county gay rights ordinances.

=== July ===
- 5 — The Liberal Party of Canada adopts an official resolution to include sexual orientation in the Canadian Human Rights Act.
- 7 - Vancouver's first gay TV program, Gayblevision, airs.
- 31 — The Toronto Board of Education (since merged into the Toronto District School Board) votes to consider whether to establish a permanent liaison committee with the gay community.

=== August ===
- Mel Boozer is nominated by petition for the vice presidency of the United States at the 1980 Democratic National Convention. After addressing the convention, Boozer withdraws himself from consideration. Boozer was separately nominated for the office by the Socialist Party USA.

=== September ===
- 9 — The former municipality of Metropolitan Toronto passes a declaration about being an equal opportunity employer, but refuses to pass a stronger Metro Bill of Rights which explicitly includes sexual orientation.
- 15 — At its first meeting, the subcommittee established by the Toronto Board of Education to explore the possibility of establishing a liaison with the gay community votes to disband.
- 10 - Germany passes the Transsexuellengesetz, allowing trans people to change their legal gender only if they get surgery, sterilization, and divorce.
- 18 — The Toronto Board of Education adopts a policy banning discrimination based on sexual orientation while adding a clause forbidding "proselytizing of homosexuality in the schools".

== See also ==
- Timeline of LGBT history — timeline of events from 12,000 BCE to present
- LGBT rights by country or territory — current legal status around the world
- LGBT social movements
