= 2012 in LGBTQ rights =

This is a list of notable events in the history of LGBTQ rights that took place in the year 2012.

== Events ==
=== January ===
- 1 – In the United States, civil union laws take effect in Delaware and Hawaii.
- 6 – After a judge's ruling, the Brazilian state of Alagoas becomes the first to recognise same-sex marriages.
- 12 – Civil union laws on the British Isle of Jersey take effect.
- 20
  - Following a ten-day trial in the United Kingdom, three Muslim men are convicted at Derby Crown Court of inciting hatred on the grounds of sexuality after distributing leaflets calling for gay men to be killed. Two other defendants are acquitted. This was the first such prosecution under hate crime legislation.
  - In the United States, Texas A&M adds sexual orientation and gender identity and expression to the university's non-discrimination policy.

=== February ===
- 7 – The United States Court of Appeals for the Ninth Circuit rules in Perry v. Schwarzenegger that California's Proposition 8, which restricts marriage to mixed-sex couples, is unconstitutional.
- 20 – Three women in rural Camaroon go on trial for "practising homosexuality". It was reported by the BBC as the first time women have been tried on such charges.
- 21 – In the United States, the Baltimore County, Maryland, County Council passes a bill prohibiting discrimination on the basis of gender identity.
- 22 – United States District Judge Jeffrey White rules that the Defense of Marriage Act is unconstitutional.
- 29 – The Saint Petersburg Legislative Assembly in Russia passes anti-LGBT rights bill with punishments up fines of to US$17,000.

=== March ===
- 1 – Malaysian High Court Judge Rohana Yusuf rules that police have the power to ban a gay arts festival.
- 25 – Slovenian voters reject the new family code granting registered same-sex partners all the rights of married couples, except with regards to joint adoptions, that was passed by the then-coalition government.

=== April ===
- 12 – In the United Kingdom, Transport for London bans an advertising campaign due to run on buses by a Christian group suggesting that gay people can be "cured" by therapy.

=== May ===
- 8 – In the United States, North Carolina voters approve of Amendment 1 bans same-sex marriages and any "domestic legal union" in the state constitution.
- 28 – In Moldova, a bill that bans discrimination on the basis of sexual orientation in employment is signed into law by the President Nicolae Timofti.
- 31 – In the United States, the 1st Circuit Court of Appeals, strikes down Section 3 of the Defense of Marriage Act as unconstitutional.

=== June ===
- 5 – After there was no estoppel in due time, the Secretary of the State of Quintana Roo, Mexico, announced same-sex marriages can be performed in the state, after two same-sex marriages took place in the Lázaro Cárdenas Municipality in late November 2011, and both were annulled in January 2012.
- 7 – Denmark's parliament passed same-sex marriage by a vote of 85 to 24. The law would take effect eight days later.

=== November ===
- 6
  - Voters in Maine approve Question 1 during the United States election, 2012 overturning a voter-approved 2009 ballot measure that banned same-sex marriage in the state.
  - Maryland voters also approve Question 6 in response to the enactment of the Civil Marriage Protection Act on March 1, 2012, thus allowing same-sex couples to obtain a civil marriage license after 1 January 2013 and also protecting clergy from having to perform any particular marriage ceremony in violation of their religious beliefs.
  - Minnesota voters reject a constitutional amendment in Amendment 1 that would have constitutionally defined marriage as one man and one woman.
  - Washington voters approve Referendum 74 legalising same-sex marriage.

=== December ===
- 5 – Supreme Court of Mexico unanimously strikes down a same-sex marriage ban in the southern state of Oaxaca, paving the way for same-sex marriages nationally.
- 27 – The Secretariat of Health in Mexico lifts the ban on men who have sex with men blood donation, allowing them to donate to the same conditions as heterosexuals.

== Deaths ==
- March 1 – Andrew Breitbart, United States, former advisory board member of the United States Republican party's GOProud, congestive heart failure.
- March 10 – Agnés Torres Hernández, Mexican, LGBT rights activist, murdered.
- March 27 – Adrienne Rich, United States, credited with bringing "the oppression of women and lesbians to the forefront of poetic discourse," rheumatoid arthritis.
- April 19 – Bettie Naylor, United States, LGBT rights activist and founding member of the Human Rights Campaign and the National Women's Political Caucus. Died in her sleep of undetermined cause.
- May 10 – George Birimisa, United States playwright, actor, and director. Complications from emphysema.
- June 24 – Gad Beck, German, last known gay Jewish Holocaust survivor. Unknown causes at a retirement home.

== See also ==
- Timeline of LGBTQ history – timeline of events from 12,000 BCE to present
- LGBTQ rights by country or territory – current legal status around the world
- LGBTQ social movements
