= 2001 in LGBTQ rights =

This is a list of notable events in the history of LGBTQ rights that took place in the year 2001.

== Events ==
- The U.S. state of Maryland bans sexual orientation discrimination in the private sector.
- Indiana governor Frank O'Bannon issues an executive order banning sexual orientation discrimination in the public sector.

=== January ===
- 26 – Italy abolishes the ban on gay and bisexual men donating blood.

=== February ===
- 14 – Jerrold Nadler, U.S. congressman from New York, reintroduces the Permanent Partners Immigration Act (H.R 690) in the U.S. Congress.

=== April ===
- 1 – In the Netherlands, legislation allowing same-sex marriage goes into effect, making it the first country to extend full marriage rights to same-sex couples.
- 16 – Oscar-winning filmmaker Steven Spielberg steps down from an advisory board of the Boy Scouts of America, citing the organization's discriminatory practices in regards to religious belief and sexual orientation.
- 17 – The Alaska Supreme Court dismisses Brause v. Alaska. The lawsuit was filed by a same-sex couple seeking the rights reserved to married couples despite a state constitutional ban on same-sex marriage. The Court rules that the couples' claim of discrimination had not ripened under state law.
- 20 – The Chinese Society of Psychiatry declares homosexuality no longer an illness. The new Chinese Classification and Diagnostic Criteria of Mental Disorders removed homosexuality from its list of mental illnesses.
- 30 – The San Francisco Board of Supervisors approves a measure allowing city employees to claim reimbursement for up to $50,000 of costs associated with sex reassignment surgery.

=== June ===
- 30 – Football hooligans, clerics, ultranationalist youth and far right skinheads storm the first Pride march in Belgrade (at the time Yugoslavia, now Serbia), attacking and seriously injuring several participants and stopping the event from taking place. The police were too poorly equipped to suppress riots or protect the Pride marchers.

=== July ===
- 17 - US state of Rhode Island bans gender identity discrimination in the private sector.
- 23 – Eight British Columbia same-sex couples begin to petition the Supreme Court of British Columbia that the definition of marriage as between a man and a woman is unconstitutional.

=== August ===
- 1 – In Germany, the Civil Union Bill goes into effect.

=== September ===
- 5 – The first couples sign the Greater London Authority's partnership register. The partnership register is a way of recognising the partnership status of couples, both same-sex and opposite-sex.

=== November ===
- 13 – In the U.S., the city council of Fort Wayne, Indiana, passes an ordinance which adds sexual orientation to its municipal anti-discrimination law.
- 17 – Vancouver, British Columbia resident Aaron Webster is killed in what many believe to be a gay bashing attack. The Canadian court system is reluctant to prosecute the case as a hate crime, believing this would be too difficult to prove, and subsequently charges four youths with manslaughter.

== Deaths ==
- September 11 – Mark Bingham, one of 37 fatalities on United Airlines flight 93 and 2,998 fatalities in the September 11 attacks on the United States. Bingham, 31, was a member of the Log Cabin Republicans.
- December 22 – Lance Loud, reality television participant (An American Family), musician (Mumps), journalist (The Advocate).

== See also ==
- Timeline of LGBT history – timeline of events from 12,000 BCE to present
- LGBT rights by country or territory – current legal status around the world
- LGBT social movements
