= 1994 in LGBTQ rights =

This is a list of notable events in the history of LGBT rights that took place in the year 1994.

== Events ==
- In Germany, a new Article 182 introduces a common age of consent of 14. Previously, the age of consent was 18 in the former West Germany (for sex between men), and 14 in the former East Germany for all.
- In the United Kingdom, the age of consent for gay men is reduced to 18, still two years more than that for heterosexuals.

=== January ===
- 12 — In Texas v. Morales, the Texas Supreme Court finds that an appellate court erred in considering a challenge to the state's sodomy law since none of the plaintiffs in the case had lost employment because of the law.

=== February ===
- 21 — The House of Commons of the United Kingdom rejects a motion to equalize the age of consent at 16, but supports an amendment to reduce the age for gay men to 18.
- 28 — The Louisiana Supreme Court reinstated the state's sodomy law, ruling that the plaintiff lacks standing to challenge it.

=== March ===
- 11 — Rather than comply with a court order that it allow an LGBTQ contingent to march, the South Boston Allied War Veterans Council cancels the Boston, Massachusetts St. Patrick's Day parade, the first time in 92 years that the city will not have a parade.
- 25 — The Washington School Board adopts a policy prohibiting discrimination based on sexual orientation in the state's public schools.

=== April ===
- 4 — Toonen v. Australia is decided by the United Nations Human Rights Committee.
- 26 — The United States Coast Guard makes public a memo issued by Commandant Thomas Fisher barring anti-gay discrimination against the service's civilian employees. Uniformed personnel are still subject to discharge under "don't ask, don't tell".
- 27 — The Interim Constitution of South Africa comes into force, including a clause explicitly prohibiting discrimination (both government and private) on the basis of sexual orientation. A subsequent court decision in 1998 will establish that the crime of sodomy was legally invalid from this date.

=== May ===
- 2 — Wayne County, Georgia commissioners vote to bar the use of county funds to "promote" homosexuality.

=== June ===
- 6 — The United States Supreme Court in the case of Farmer v. Brennan orders a lower court to consider whether failure to protect a male-to-female transgender prisoner in an all-male institution from rape violates the Eighth Amendment to the United States Constitution.
- 7 — The Parliament of Sweden approves registered partnerships for same-sex couples, effective January 1, 1995. Same-sex couples will not receive the right to a church wedding, the right to adopt children or the right to artificial insemination.
- 26 - The first Pride March in Asia was held in the Philippines. It was organized by the Progressive Organization of Gays in the Philippines and was supported by the Metropolitan Community Church.

=== August ===
- 9 — District judge S. Arthur Spiegel voids Cincinnati's Ballot Issue 3, which repealed the city's gay rights ordinance.

=== October ===
- 11 — The Colorado Supreme Court affirms a lower district court's ruling that Amendment 2 is unconstitutional.

=== December ===
- 6 — The American Medical Association declares its opposition to treatments intended to cure homosexuality.

== Deaths ==
- July 26 — W. Dorr Legg, early homophile activist and co-founder of One, Inc.

== See also ==
- Timeline of LGBT history — timeline of events from 12,000 BCE to present
- LGBT rights by country or territory — current legal status around the world
- LGBT social movements
