= 2007 in LGBTQ rights =

This is a list of notable events in the history of LGBTQ rights that took place in the year 2007.

== Events ==
=== January ===
- 1
  - Registered partnerships begin in Switzerland.
  - Equality Act (Sexual Orientation) Regulations comes into effect in Northern Ireland.
- January 11 – The Mexican northern state of Coahuila, which borders Texas, passes (20–13) a bill legalizing same-sex civil unions, under the name Pacto Civil de Solidaridad (Civil Union Pact). After a similar measure was approved in Mexico City in November 2006.

=== February ===
- 28 – Equalised age of consent comes into effect in United Kingdom territory of Jersey.

=== March ===
- 17 – The Soulforce Equality Ride visits 32 schools in the United States that ban enrollment of openly gay students.
- 27 – A group of 29 human rights experts including seven United Nations Special Rapporteurs and a former United Nations High Commissioner for Human Rights releases the Yogyakarta Principles on the Application of International Human Rights Law in Relation to Sexual Orientation and Gender Identity.

=== April ===
- 10 – The legislature of the U.S. state of Washington passes S5336, giving final approval to domestic partnership legislation, which would give same-sex couples many state rights of marriage.
- 26 – The legislature of the U.S. state of New Hampshire passes legislation for civil unions, which give same-sex couples many state rights of marriage.
- 30 – Regulations covering the provision of goods, facilities and services, outlawing discrimination on the grounds of sexual orientation enter into force in Great Britain.

=== May ===
- 8 – In the U.S. Congress, New York congressman Jerrold Nadler and Vermont senator Patrick Leahy reintroduce the Uniting American Families Act (UAFA) (H.R.2221 & S.1328).
- 9 – U.S. state of Oregon bans discrimination based on sexual orientation (which is legally defined to include gender identity) in the private sector.
- 17 – Ted Strickland, governor of the U.S. state of Ohio, issues an executive order banning discrimination based on sexual orientation or gender identity in the public sector.
- 22 – U.S. state of Vermont bans gender identity discrimination in the private sector.
- 24 – Jenny Bailey becomes the first transsexual mayor in the United Kingdom.
- 25
  - U.S. state of Colorado bans discrimination based on sexual orientation or gender identity in the private sector.
  - U.S. state of Iowa bans discrimination based on sexual orientation or gender identity in the private sector.

=== June ===
- 1 – Registered partnerships begin in South Australia.

=== August ===
- 9 – Visible Vote '08: A Presidential Forum, the first ever LGBT issues debate is hosted by the Logo cable television channel. Six candidates for the Democratic party's presidential nomination participate in the event.
- 31 – Kathleen Sebelius, governor of the U.S. state of Kansas, issues an executive order banning discrimination based on sexual orientation and gender identity in the public sector.

=== September ===
- 17 – The Maryland Court of Appeals overturns a lower court ruling in Deane & Polyak v. Conaway and rules that the Maryland constitution does not require the state to recognize or sanction same-sex marriage.

=== November ===
- 13 – Charles Iavarone, Supervisor of the Town of Salina, proposes human rights legislation which included a domestic partnership registry for the town. The board's only Democrat sided with two Republicans to defeat the law.
- 21 – Jennifer Granholm, governor of the U.S. state of Michigan, issues an executive order prohibiting employment discrimination based on gender identity or expression in the public sector.
- 29
  - The first foreign gay wedding is held in Hanoi, Vietnam, between a Japanese and an Irish national.
  - Uruguay becomes the first Latin American country to pass a national civil union law.

=== December ===
- 16 – In South Africa, the Criminal Law (Sexual Offences and Related Matters) Amendment Act, 2007 comes into force, setting an equal age of consent at 16; previously it had been 16 for heterosexual sex and 19 for homosexual sex.
- 17 – The National Assembly of Hungary passes registered partnerships, to become effective on January 1, 2009. The law gives the same rights to registered partners as to married spouses except for adoption.

== Deaths ==
- February 18 – Barbara Gittings, 75, U.S. gay rights activist
- March 14 – Ryan Skipper, 25, U.S. victim of an anti-gay hate crime
- May 15 – Yolanda King, U.S. civil rights and gay rights activist
- November 29 – Jane Rule, 76, U.S. lesbian author and advocate of gay rights

== See also ==
- Timeline of LGBTQ history – timeline of events from 12,000 BCE to present
- LGBTQ rights by country or territory – current legal status around the world
- LGBTQ social movements
