= 1970 in LGBTQ rights =

This is a list of notable events in the history of LGBT rights that took place in the year 1970.

== Events ==
=== March ===
- 8 — Police, led by Seymour Pine of the Stonewall raid the year before, raid an illegal gay bar called the Snake Pit in Greenwich Village. 167 people are arrested.
- 17 — The film The Boys in the Band premieres in New York City.

=== April ===
- 7
  - Midnight Cowboy, the first major Hollywood film to feature a same-sex sexual encounter between two men, wins the Oscar for Best Picture.
  - John Schlesinger wins Best Director at the Academy Awards.
- 13 — John Lindsay, the Mayor of New York City, was confronted by protestors from the Gay Activist Alliance at the Metropolitan Opera House.

=== May ===
- 9 — A high school teacher named Ingrid Mykle Montano in Phoenix, Arizona, is forced to resign after parents complain about her inviting a gay man to speak in one of her sociology classes.
- 21 — Bella Abzug speaks at a Gay Activist Alliance meeting, becoming the first politician to court the LGBT community's votes in the United States.

=== June ===
- 12 — Lesbians Neva Joy Heckmann and Judith Ann Belew marry in Los Angeles.
- 24 — The Rockefeller Five, five activists from the Gay Activists Alliance, are arrested during a sit-in at the Republican Senate Committee headquarters.
- 27 — Chicago holds the first LGBT Pride parade in the USA.
- 28 — On the one-year anniversary of the Stonewall riots, what started out as a march on Christopher Street in New York City of a few hundred people turned into thousands of people ending in Central Park. It brought gay and lesbian individuals together to demonstrate that they were a sizable minority population.

=== July ===
- 1 — The Gay Liberation Task Force meets for the first time at the American Library Association Annual Conference in Detroit, Michigan.

=== September ===
- 5 — Colombia changes "homosexual behavior" from a felony into a misdemeanor, and the maximum penalty is reduced to three years.

=== October ===
- 13 — London gay activists hold the first meeting of the London incarnation of the Gay Liberation Front.

== See also ==
- Timeline of LGBT history — timeline of events from 12,000 BCE to present
- LGBT rights by country or territory — current legal status around the world
- LGBT social movements
