= 1990 in LGBTQ rights =

This is a list of notable events in the history of LGBT rights that took place in the year 1990.

== Events ==
- Reunification of West and East Germany — reunification treaty has an article to prevent West Germany's higher age of consent for sex between men taking effect in the former East Germany.
- San Diego, California, prohibits employment discrimination based on sexual orientation in the private sector.

=== February ===
- 2 — The United States Court of Appeals for the Ninth Circuit in High Tech Gays v. Defense Industrial Security Clearance Office uses rational basis review and rules that the federal government can deny security clearances to homosexuals.

=== March ===
- Queer Nation, a direct action group is founded in New York City by activists from the AIDS Coalition to Unleash Power (ACT UP).

=== May ===
- 10 — Direct action group OutRage! is formed in the United Kingdom.

=== August ===
- 18 - President George Bush signs the Ryan White Care Act, a program for people living with AIDS.

=== October ===
- 27 — The U.S. Congress repeals a law prohibiting gays from being admitted into the country.

=== November ===
- 6
  - Voters in Seattle, Washington, reject Initiative 35, which would have repealed an ordinance granting domestic partnership rights for medical leave and bereavement leave.
  - By a margin of two to one, voters in Tacoma, Washington, reject a ballot initiative which would have reinstated a gay civil rights law repealed by voters in November 1989.
  - Deborah Glick becomes the first openly gay or lesbian individual elected to the legislature of the U.S. state of New York.

=== December ===
- 10 — Colorado Governor Roy Romer issues an executive order prohibiting sexual orientation discrimination in the public sector.
- 17 — Connecticut state legislator Joseph Grabarz comes out, becoming the state's first openly gay state legislator.

== See also ==
- Timeline of LGBT history — timeline of events from 12,000 BCE to present
- LGBT rights by country or territory — current legal status around the world
- LGBT social movements
