= 1999 in LGBTQ rights =

This is a list of notable events in the history of LGBT rights that took place in the year 1999.

== Events ==
- U.S. state of Nevada bans sexual orientation discrimination in the private sector.
- Ohio governor Bob Taft(R) rescinds a 1984 executive order by then-governor Dick Celeste(D) banning discrimination based on sexual orientation in the public sector.
- San Jose, California, prohibits employment discrimination based on sexual orientation in the private sector.

=== February ===
- 15 – Stephen Brady and his partner Peter Stephens became the world's first officially acknowledged gay ambassadorial couple, when Brady, accompanied by Stephens, presented his credentials as Australia's Ambassador to Denmark to Queen Margrethe II of Denmark.
- 28 – In the United Kingdom, The Queer Youth Alliance is founded, the first such "youth-led" gay rights organisation.

=== March ===
- 22 – The Brazilian Federal Council of Medicine has published a resolution prohibiting conversion therapies for homosexual people.
- 29 – In New Zealand, immigration law changes approved by the cabinet in 1998 allow gay and lesbian couples the same rights as straight de facto couples applying for permanent residency under the relationship category. Prior to the change, gay and lesbian couples spent twice as long waiting for residency than straight couples. Scott Fack and Noel Turner were the "poster boys" for this change through the gay media, including Express Newspaper and the Queer Nation television show.

=== July ===
- 12 – In Chile, the National Congress decriminalized sodomy.

=== September ===
- 14 – Iowa governor Tom Vilsack(D) issues an executive order prohibiting discrimination based on sexual orientation or gender identity in the public sector.
- 27 – The European Court for Human Rights rules that the United Kingdom's ban on gay military personnel is a breach of human rights, although the court does not have the power to unilaterally lift the ban.

=== October ===
- 2 – California governor Gray Davis(D) signs three gay rights bills into law. The first outlaws harassment of homosexual students and teachers in the state's public schools. The second creates a new statewide domestic partnership registry. The third outlaws job and housing discrimination on the basis of sexual orientation.
- 13 – In France, the National Assembly grants unwed mixed- and same-sex couples the same rights as married couples.
- 15 – The Washington Times reports claims George W. Bush assured conservative supporters that he would not "knowingly" appoint any homosexuals as ambassadors or department heads in his administration if elected president.
- 15–17, First International Drag King Extravaganza, Columbus, Ohio.
- 22 – Boeing begins offering domestic partner health benefits.
- 27
  - The government of the Canadian province of Ontario changes 67 laws to give same-sex couples the same rights as married couples.
  - The Fourth Court of Appeals in San Antonio, Texas, rules in Littleton v. Prange a post-operative transgender woman remains legally male and therefore her marriage to a man was invalid.

=== November ===
- 1 – Nancy Katz becomes the first openly lesbian judge in the U.S. state of Illinois.
- 3 – Aaron McKinney found guilty of murdering Matthew Shepard. He is sentenced to two consecutive life terms in prison.

=== December ===
- 2 – In the case of National Coalition for Gay and Lesbian Equality v Minister of Home Affairs, the Constitutional Court of South Africa extends spousal immigration benefits to partners in permanent same-sex relationships.
- 7 – The Orange County, California, school board votes unanimously to reject the formation of a gay–straight alliance at El Modena High School.
- 9 – In light of the passage of Amendment 2, the Hawaii Supreme Court rules in Baehr v. Miike that it is no longer unconstitutional for the state not to issue marriage licenses to same-sex couples.
- 20 – In Baker v. Vermont, the Vermont Supreme Court orders the state legislature to devise a law to give same-sex couples identical rights to married couples.

== See also ==
- Timeline of LGBT history – timeline of events from 12,000 BCE to present
- LGBT rights by country or territory – current legal status around the world
- LGBT social movements
