= 1989 in LGBTQ rights =

This is a list of notable events in the history of LGBT rights that took place in the year 1989.

== Events ==
- In the United Kingdom, the Stonewall gay rights lobbying group is founded.
- In East Germany, Article 151 is deleted from the penal code. Homosexuality and heterosexuality were then treated equally with an age of consent of 14.
- Long Beach, California, prohibits employment discrimination based on sexual orientation in the private sector.
- Los Angeles County, California, prohibits employment discrimination based on sexual orientation in the private sector.

=== March ===
- 7 — The appeal of a transgender woman against UK law not allowing her to legally change sex and to marry a male is rejected by the European Commission of Human Rights, with one member dissenting and also arguing in favour of same-sex marriage.

=== June ===
- 7 — Denmark creates registered partnerships for same-sex couples, offering identical rights as marriage within the country.

=== November ===
- 7 — Voters repeal gay rights ordinances in the U.S. cities of Athens, Ohio; Tacoma, Washington; and Irvine and Concord, California.
- 15 — Private-sector sexual orientation discrimination becomes illegal in the U.S. state of Massachusetts.
- 30 — U.S. city of Columbus, Ohio, adopts a hate crimes bill which includes sexual orientation.

=== December ===
- 10 — New York City sees approximately 4,500 protestors at St. Patrick's Cathedral during mass in a "Stop the Church" action organized by ACT UP and Women's Health Action and Mobilization to demonstrate dissatisfaction with the Roman Catholic Archdiocese's position against AIDS education, the distribution of condoms, and abortion. 111 protestors are arrested.

== See also ==
- Timeline of LGBT history — timeline of events from 12,000 BCE to present
- LGBT rights by country or territory — current legal status around the world
- LGBT social movements
