= 1971 in LGBTQ rights =

This is a list of notable events in the history of LGBTQ (lesbian, gay, bisexual, and transgender) rights that took place in the year 1971.

== Events ==
- Frank Kameny becomes the first openly gay candidate for the United States Congress when he runs in the first election for the District of Columbia's non-voting delegate to Congress.
- The Front homosexuel d'action révolutionnaire (Homosexual Front for Revolutionary Action) forms in France.

=== March ===
- 18 — Idaho decriminalizes homosexual acts between consenting adults, but the repeal is itself repealed before taking effect.
- 24 — In a case granting citizenship to a Cuban man, a federal judge rules that homosexuality alone cannot bar a person from becoming a United States citizen.

=== April ===
- 1 — The French magazine Tout is seized by police, who characterize its call for sexual liberation in that country an "outrage to public morals".

=== May ===
- 15 — The first Gay Power march in Europe takes place in Örebro, Sweden, by a group called sv:Gay Power Club.

=== July ===
- 1
  - The Gay Alliance Toward Equality is founded as Canada's first gay rights organization.
  - In the United Kingdom, the International Times loses an appeal on indecency charges for running personal ads for gay men.
- 10 — Austria decriminalizes homosexual acts between consenting adults.
- 21 — George Klippert is released from prison, two years after homosexuality was decriminalized in Canada.

=== August ===
- 28 - An "Age of Consent" protest is held in London.This protested the age of consent discrepancies between homosexual and heterosexuals couples.

=== October ===
- 1 — Connecticut decriminalizes homosexual acts between consenting adults.
- 12 — The New York City Department of Consumer Affairs recommends the repeal of a city law banning homosexuals from working in or going to bars.

=== November ===
- 1 — The Body Politic, Canada's first gay rights magazine, hits newsstands.

=== December ===
- 14 — The U.S. gay rights activist group Gay Activists Alliance protest in front of the Suffolk County, New York, police headquarters after two members were arrested for sodomy.

== See also ==
- Timeline of LGBT history — timeline of events from 12,000 BCE to present
- LGBT rights by country or territory — current legal status around the world
- LGBT social movements
