= 2026 in LGBTQ rights =

This is a list of notable events in the history of LGBTQ rights taking place in the year 2026.

== Events ==
=== January ===
- January 29 – The Council of Europe adopted a resolution, by 71 votes to 26, calling for a ban on conversion therapies in Europe.

=== February ===
- February 13 – The Sri Lanka Tourism Development Authority (SLTDA) endorsed a proposal by the LGBT+ advocacy group Equal Ground to market the Indian Ocean island as an inclusive tourist destination. After criticism of the endorsement from senior Buddhist monks and the head of the Catholic church in Sri Lanka, Attorney General Parinda Ranasinghe withdrew support.
- February 23 – 2025–2026 Dutch cabinet formation: Rob Jetten is sworn in as first gay Prime Minister of the Netherlands, heading a minority government.
- February 24 – In his annual State of the Union address, President of the United States Donald Trump calls for a ban on states and schools allowing transgender and nonbinary students to socially transition without parental consent.
- February 27 – The Brazilian Supreme Court has invalidated two laws that prohibited gender-neutral language in schools, one from the state of Amazonas and the other from the city of Navegantes.

=== March ===
- March 03 – The Brazilian state of Alagoas has passed a law prohibiting young people from participating in pride parades in the state.
- March 04 – The Ukrainian Supreme Court in Kyiv confirms first recognition of de facto marriage between two men in Ukraine.
- March 11 – The Senegal National Assembly passes a bill doubling the maximum prison term for same-sex sexual acts to 10 years and criminalizing the promotion or financing of homosexuality.
- March 11 – Brazilian congresswoman Erika Hilton has been elected president of the Women's Commission of the Chamber of Deputies, becoming the first transgender woman to hold the position.
- March 20 – The Supreme Administrative Court of Poland has ruled that a marriage between two same-sex individuals is to be recognised through transcription of their marriage act from a different country allowing same-sex marriage.
- March 26 – The IOC announced that transgender and intersex athletes would be banned from women's sports at the Olympics.
  - In Brazil, the mayor of Salvador, Bruno Soares Reis (UNIÃO), signed a law prohibiting the teaching of gender identity in the city's schools.
- March 31 – The U.S. Supreme Court struck down a Colorado law that banned conversion therapies by a vote of 8–1.

=== April ===
- April 1 – Senegalese President Bassirou Diomaye Faye has signed into law the bill that increases the penalty for homosexuality.
  - The governor of the Brazilian state of Santa Catarina, Jorginho Mello (PL), has signed a law that allows parents to prohibit their children from participating in classes on LGBTQ topics and gender equality.
- April 17 – In Brazil, the Court of Justice of Santa Catarina voted unanimously to strike down a law that allowed parents to prohibit their children from participating in classes on LGBTQ topics and gender equality.
- April 21 – EU-highest court in Luxembourg decided, that a "Homo-Propaganda"-law in Hungary is against the laws of EU.
- April 22 – In Brazil, the mayor of Campo Grande, Adriane Lopes (PP), has signed a law prohibiting transgender women from using public women's restrooms.
- April 29 – In the United Kingdom, the Crime and Policing Bill received Royal Assent, changing the law to make anti-LGBTQ+ hate crime an aggravated offence. Although anti-LGBTQ+ hate crime had long been recognised in British law, offences motivated by race or religion historically carried stronger maximum penalties. Under the new legislation, the punishment for anti-LGBTQ+ hate crimes will be equalised.
- April 30 – The Parliament of Europe adopted a resolution, calling for a ban on conversion therapies in all member states of EU.

=== May ===
- May 14 – A Polish authority performed the country's first transcription recognizing a same-sex marriage contracted in another EU member state.

=== June ===
- June 11 – In Brazil, the Court of Justice of Mato Grosso voted unanimously to strike down a law in Cuiabá that banned trans people from competing in women’s sports.
- June 12 – Niger's new penal code proceeded to sanction "same-sex sexual relations" and "lesbian, gay, bisexual, transgender, queer, intersexual, asexual (LGBTQIA+)" acts or practices with penalties ranging from 5 to 10 years in prison.
- June 16 – In Brazil, the Court of Justice of Maranhão ruled that the state government must recognize non-binary people.
- June 18 – A three-judge bench of the Nepal Supreme Court orders the government to legalize same-sex marriage.

=== July ===
- July 14 – In Brazil, Pará Governor Hana Ghassan has signed a law authorizing religious institutions to restrict the use of restrooms based on biological sex.

=== August ===
- August 14 – The National Assembly of Ecuador passed, by a vote of 118-0, a law to ban same-sex adoption and the promotion of gender-affirming care for minors.

=== September ===
- September 13 – In Turkey, hundreds of people are arrested in a crackdown on LGBTQ expression and subsequent protests.

=== October ===
- October 13 – On 13 October 2026, the amendment of Hungarian anti-LGBTQ law was passed by Hungarian Parliament by a vote of 139–51.

=== November ===
- November 10 - On 10 November 2026, Trinidad and Tobago overturns the 2025 ruling that reinstated the sodomy laws.
