= 2020 in LGBTQ rights =

This is a list of notable events in the history of LGBTQ rights that took place in the year 2020.

== Events ==
=== January ===
- 1 - A law allowing a third gender option on driver licenses takes effect in New Hampshire.
- 13 - Same-sex marriage legislation goes fully into effect in Northern Ireland.

=== February ===
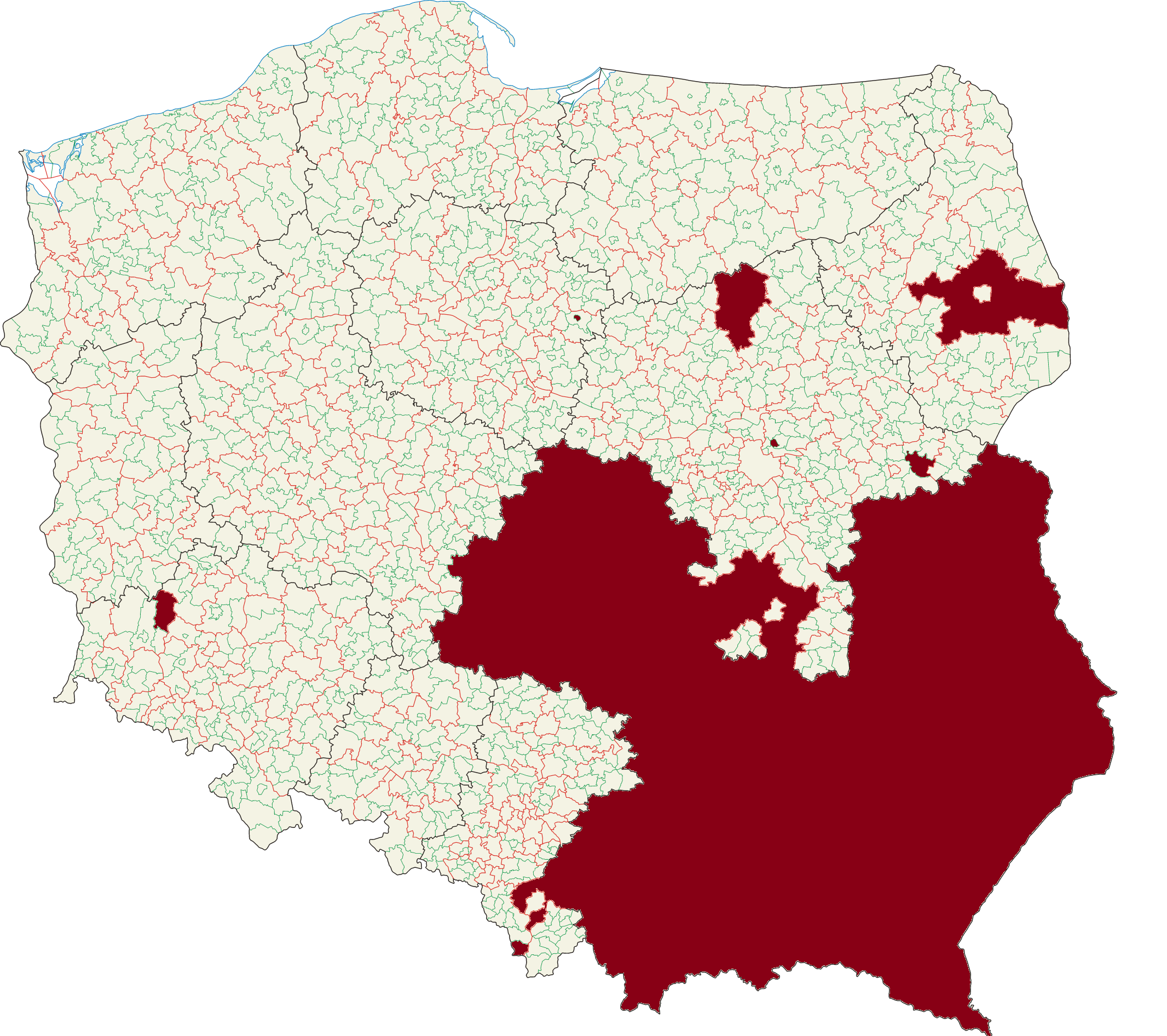
Voivodeships, powiats, and gminas marked in red had passed anti-LGBT resolutions by January 2020.

- 7 - Croatia's top court has ruled blocking gay couples from fostering children as unconstitutional, making fostering legal for gay couples in Croatia effective immediately, by overruling part of a law regarding the foster system introduced in 2018 that barred gay couples from fostering.
- 9 - Switzerland banned discrimination on the basis of sexuality through a referendum, putting into effect a law previously introduced in 2018, that was subsequently blocked by the government that requested a referendum to be held on the matter first.
- 11 - In Northern Ireland the first same-sex couple married, after legislation to allow this took effect in January to allow such to happen. Same-sex couples will be able to file for marriage from this day onwards in Northern Ireland.
- 25 - In Israel a change of gender on a passport no longer requires surgery to have occurred and the age for which this change is possible has been lowered from 18 to 16 year old.
- 27 - The Supreme Court of Israel rules that the country's current surrogacy law, which denies access to surrogacy for same-sex couples, is discriminatory and unconstitutional, and instructs the government to amend it within one year.
- In February 2020, local governments controlling a third of Poland officially declared themselves as "against "LGBT ideology" or passed "pro-family" Charters, pledging to refrain from encouraging tolerance or funding NGOs working for LGBT rights.

=== March ===
- 4
  - In Hong Kong the High Court has struck down discriminatory public housing policies quoting the authority "has not been able to point to any difference between [the applicant’s] marriage and other foreign opposite-sex marriages." and "There is no reason to believe that low-income families constituted by same-sex couples have any lesser need for housing than low-income families constituted by opposite-sex couples without children." This ruling effectively means public housing for families will now be available to same-sex couples in Hong Kong, and so long otherwise eligible foreigners who reside in Hong Kong with a valid marriage license above who are in a same-sex relationship.
  - In Virginia the governor has signed a bill into law that bans conversion therapy for minors after it passed in both the Senate and the House.
- 5 - In Washington the governor has signed a bill into law after both the house and senate passed it, to remove the "gay panic defence" as a defence for committing a crime (usually a homicide), making the discovery of someone's sex, gender or sexuality no longer a legally valid defence for committing a crime in the state. Before the passing of this bill, one could claim "reduced capacity" to judge the severity of their actions based on a discovery of sex, gender or sexuality.

=== April ===
- 2 - In the United States of America, the Food and Drug Administration, in urgent need of blood due to the COVID-19 pandemic, relaxed blood donation restrictions of men who have sex with men, reducing the deferral period from one year to three months.
- 23 - Same-sex marriage becomes legal in Sark.

=== May ===
- 4 - In Ireland (female) same sex couples who chose to have a child via a DAHR procedure (Artificial Insemination with a traceable donor) can now both be co-registered as parents of the child, as is also done with this procedure when it's for opposite sex couple.
- 7 - German parliament Bundestag banned nationwide conversion therapy for minors until 18 years and forbids advertising of conversion therapy. It also forbids conversion therapy for adults, if they decided by force, fraud or pressure.
- 9 - In Brazil the supreme court have struck down a law that banned LGBT people from donating blood for one year after having sex as unconstitutional.
- 16 - Albania becomes third European country to ban conversion therapy.
- 21 - Hungary ends recognition of changes of sex for legal purposes including on documents for those who are transgender and intersex
- 22 - The president of Zambia has pardoned nearly 3000 inmates that were convicted for Homosexuality in the past decade(s). Homosexuality does remain illegal in Zambia.
- 26 - In Costa Rica same-sex marriages became legal.
- 27 - In Malaysia which has a dual-track legal system, with Islamic criminal and family laws applicable to Muslims running alongside civil laws. Federal Court of Malaysia has given the go-ahead for a man to challenge an Islamic ban on sex "against the order of nature".

=== June ===
- 12 - In the United States of America, the Department of Health and Human Services has rolled back an Obama-era executive order which made it so transgender individuals were protected from discrimination in healthcare. This executive order made it so discrimination of the basis of sex also included discrimination of sex-stereotypes in relation to HHS guidelines, effectively making it illegal for healthcare providers and insurance to discriminate against transgender individuals for being transgender. The rolling back of this executive order means transgender people in the US can legally be discriminated against in access and price of healthcare and healthcare insurance on the basis of being transgender.
- 15 - In the United States of America, The Supreme Court extended federal job protections provided to the gay, lesbian, bisexual, transgender workers in 6–3 ruling. In the case R.G. & G.R. Harris Funeral Homes Inc. v. Equal Employment Opportunity Commission ruled that discrimination of employees due to gender identity is prohibited under Title VII of the Civil Rights Act of 1964. In the case Bostock v. Clayton County ruled that discrimination of employees due to sexual orientation is prohibited under Title VII of the Civil Rights Act of 1964.

=== July ===
- 1
  - Montenegro voted to legalise same-sex civil partnerships.
  - In Russia a referendum on more than 200 constitutional amendments resulted in a constitutional ban on same-sex marriages.
- 7 - The President of Gabon signed a law decriminalizing same-sex sexual activity in the country.
- 17 - Sudan has lifted the death penalty for homosexuality. Homosexuality does remain criminalised.
- 24 - In Mexico, Mexico City becomes the first state to ban conversion therapy.

=== August ===
- 1 - In South Africa state marriage officers and magistrates can no longer decline to wed same-sex couples. A consciousness clause had previously in place allowing individual magistrates and state marriage officers to decline.
- 5 - In Barbados discrimination on the basis of sexuality has become illegal after the House and Senate passed a bill that inserted various employment-discrimination protections into the law.

=== September ===
- 18 - In Hong Kong the high court ruled that the inheritance and intestacy laws of the city have to apply equally to same-sex couples as they do for opposite-sex couples.
- 22 - In the United States of America, President Donald Trump signed an executive order banning diversity training in government agencies and for government contractors, hampering the ability of both to deal with workplace discrimination against employees on various grounds, including LGBT related reasons.

=== October ===
- 20 - In Mexico, State of Mexico becomes the second state to ban conversion therapy.

=== November ===
- 3 - In Nevada, during the 2020 United States elections, ballot measure "Question 2" was passed with a majority support of voters, enshrining protection for same-sex marriage in the state constitution. While this has no immediate effect in the (continued) availability of marriage to same-sex couples because the Supreme Court ruled in Obergefell v. Hodges in 2015 that barring same-sex couples from marrying is unconstitutional, Nevada still had an unenforceable ban on same-sex marriage in its state constitution, which was repealed and replaced by this ballot measure.
- 4 - In Mexico, the state congress of Puebla has passed amendments to the law that result in the legalisation of same-sex marriage in the state.
- 9 - In Canada, Yukon becomes the first territory to ban conversion therapy.
- 26 - In Mexico, Puebla becomes the first state to create a specialized unit in charge of investigating crimes against LGBT people.

=== December ===
- 8 - In Mexico, Tlaxcala becomes the 22nd state in the country to legalise same-sex marriage.
- 13 - New Zealand relaxed blood donation restrictions of men who have sex with men, reducing the deferral period from one year to three months.
- 14 - The United Kingdom lifts the deferral period in blood donation for men who have sex with men, allowing them to donate under the same conditions as the rest of the population.
- 15 - In Hungary, a constitutional amendment was passed that introduced a ban on same-sex marriage and adoption by same-sex couples and LGBT individuals.
- 16 - In Uruguay, the previously existing ban on blood donations by men who have sex with men was lifted via presidential decree, allowing them to donate under the same conditions as the rest of the population.
