= 2023 in LGBTQ rights =

This is a list of notable events in the history of LGBTQ rights that took place in the year 2023.

== Events ==
=== February ===
- 1 -
  - A law legalizing same-sex marriage came into force in Slovenia.
  - Finland's parliament passed a law allowing trans people to change their legal gender without them needing to be infertile or to have been sterilized.
- 6 - The Hong Kong Court of Final Appeal ruled that government policy forcing transgender individuals to undergo sex reassignment surgery before changing their gender on their ID cards is unconstitutional.
- 7 - A court ruling legalizing recognition of same-sex couples and same-sex marriage came into force in Curaçao.
- 9 - The Senate of Spain passed, with 144 votes in favor, 108 votes against, and 2 abstentions the so-called ley trans bill. The latter allows all transgender people 16 or older to legally change their gender by simply signing a declaration (without the need for prior psychological counseling with a therapist); it also grants transgender people aged 12 to 16 the ability to legally change their gender under certain conditions.
- 16 - The ley trans passed the Spanish Parliament after the Congress of Deputies approved it in its second reading with 191 votes in favour, 60 against, and 91 abstentions.
- 17 -
  - A law legalizing same-sex marriage came into force in Andorra.
  - The Government of the United Kingdom used section 35 of the Scotland Act 1998 to block the Gender Recognition Reform (Scotland) Bill from receiving royal assent, effectively vetoing it. Had the bill become law, it would have made it easier for trans Scottish citizens to change their legal gender.
- 23 - A South Korean High Court recognized the legal status of same-sex couples while ruling on a case considering a same-sex partner's right to spousal coverage under the national health insurance service.
- 24 - Kenya's Supreme Court ruled that, even if homosexual intercourse is prohibited by the law, the constitutionally protected right to freedom of expression and of assembly extends to LGBT advocacy groups.

=== March ===
- 2 - The ley trans came into force in Spain.
- 20 - The Supreme Court of Nepal issues a non-binding ruling asking the government to recognize same-sex marriage in the country.
- 21 - The Parliament of Uganda passed by voice vote the Anti-Homosexuality Bill, which prescribes the death penalty for "aggravated homosexuals" (definition which includes those who are convicted of homosexuality more than once and those who engage in homosexual sex with a person older than 75 or with a disabled person) and imprisonment for up to 20 years for "promoters of homosexuality".

=== April ===
- 14 - The Parliament of the Cook Islands passed into law the Crimes (Sexual Offences) Amendment Bill 2023, decriminalizing homosexuality. The bill will come into effect on June 1.

=== May ===
- 16 - The Namibian Supreme Court ruled 4–1 that same-sex marriages concluded outside of Namibia should be recognised for residency purposes.
- 16 - Taiwan's Legislative Yuan passed a bill granting full adoption rights to same-sex couples.
- 25 - Cyprus' Parliament passed a bill criminalizing conversion therapy.
- 29 - Ugandan President Yoweri Museveni signed the Anti-Homosexuality Bill into law.

=== June ===
- 1 -
  - The Crimes (Sexual Offences) Amendment Act 2023 came into effect, decriminalizing homosexuality in the Cook Islands.
  - A law granting same-sex couples the right to adopt came into force in Liechtenstein.
- 10 - The Parliament of Iceland passed a bill criminalizing conversion therapy with 53 votes in favor and 3 abstentions.
- 13 - The City Council of Hamtramck, Michigan introduced a resolution prohibiting the display of all flags but the American flag and “nations’ flags that represent the international character of [the] City,” which many interpreted as an indirectly targeted ban of the rainbow flag on city property and sidewalks, which had previously been the source of controversy among some residents. Following three hours of public comment, the Council passed the resolution unanimously.
- 14 - The Dane County Board of Supervisors passes a resolution declaring the county to be the first sanctuary for transgender and non-binary individuals in the United States.
- 20 - The Parliament of Estonia (Riigikogu) passed a bill allowing same-sex marriages, which will come into effect on January 1, 2024.
- 28 - A single judge bench of the Nepal Supreme Court orders the government to establish a separate register for sexual minorities and non-traditional couples and to temporarily register them.

=== July ===
- 14 - The Russian State Duma approves a bill banning gender-affirming care and sex reassignment surgeries.
- 28 - In Bulgaria, a law on amendments and supplements to the criminal code is approved, which provides for heavier penalties for crimes committed on the basis of the victim's sexual orientation.

=== August ===
- 22 - Brazil’s Supreme Federal Court ruled that the current protections afforded by federal hate crime law extends to LGBTQ+ individuals. This decision implies that people who engage in hate speech targeted at LGBTQ+ people could potentially face imprisonment ranging from two to five years.

=== September ===
- 5 - The Hong Kong Court of Final Appeal issued its decision in the case of Sham Tsz Kit v Secretary for Justice, ruling that the government's lack of recognition of same-sex partnerships violates the right to privacy under the Basic Law. The ruling is suspended for two years in order to give the government time to comply with the decision.

=== October ===
- 4 - The Supreme Court of Mauritius ruled that Section 250 of the country's Criminal Code, which criminalized gay sex, is unconstitutional.
- 10 - The Legislative Assembly of Amazonas, in Brazil, approved by a vote of 14–4 a law that prohibits the teaching of gender-neutral language in state schools.
- 17 - The Supreme Court of India, in Supriyo v. Union of India, ruled that the legalization of same-sex marriage is a matter for the Parliament to decide, not the courts, but said that the country had a duty to acknowledge LGBTQ relationships and to protect them from discrimination.

=== November ===
- 9 - The Saeima, Latvia's parliament, voted to allow same-sex couples to establish civil unions, providing them with legal recognition but fewer rights than married couples. The new legislation allows same-sex couples to register their partnership with a notary.
- 29 - Authorities in the Lumjung district in Nepal formally registered the union of an LGBT couple, the first same-sex marriage to be registered in the country.
- 30 - Russia's Supreme Court, in a ruling prompted by a motion from the Ministry of Justice, declared what it calls "the international LGBT public movement" an extremist organization and banned its activities across the country. The ruling came after a closed-door hearing and no one from "the defendant's side" was present.

=== December ===
- 17 - The Church of England blessed same-sex couples for the first time, while maintaining its opposition to performing same-sex weddings in church.
- 18 - The Catholic Church approves non-liturgical blessing ceremonies for same-sex couples in document Fiducia supplicans, but clarifies that it still deems same-sex activity to be sinful.
