= 2021 in LGBTQ rights =

This is a list of notable events in the history of LGBTQ rights that took place in the year 2021.

== Events ==
=== January ===
- 7 - In the United States, the Labor Department suspended an executive order banning government agencies and contractors from providing diversity training, after LGBT advocacy groups from the Northern District of California filed suit and a federal judge granted a preliminary nationwide injunction against the executive order.
- 20 - In the United States, President Joe Biden has signed an executive order just hours after his inauguration making the government recognise more protections against discrimination on the basis of sex, to include sexuality, gender identity and sex stereotypes in line with the interpretation of sex discrimination in Bostock v. Clayton County, reversing the changes in interpretation of anti-discrimination laws made by the previous president in regard to discrimination in housing, education, access to shelters and various other areas. It also ordered all federal agencies to review existing regulations and policies that prohibit sex discrimination, and to revise them as necessary to clarify that "sex" includes sexual orientation and gender identity.
- 25 - In the United States, President Joe Biden signed an executive order ending the ban on service by transgender people in the military that had gone into effect on 22 January 2019.

=== February ===
- 9 - In Angola a new criminal code has gone into effect after the parliament passed it in January 2019 and president signed it into law in November 2020. The new penal code no longer criminalises Homosexuality and it contains full anti-discrimination protections on the basis of sexuality and gender identity.
- 14 - In New York, commercial surrogacy has become legal for both same-sex and opposite-sex couples after being previously banned.
- 17 - In Bhutan, a new penal code has been signed into the law. Homosexuality is no longer a crime in Bhutan.

=== March ===
- 11 - The EU parliament decides that the whole territory of all EU member states is a freedom zone for LGBTQIA+ people.

=== April ===
- 6 - Arkansas passes HB 1570 which bans the provision of gender-affirming healthcare to those under 18.

=== May ===
- 10 - In The United States of America, President Joe Biden reverses a policy enacted during the Trump administration which previously allowed healthcare companies to deny coverage to gay and transgender people.

=== June ===
- 7 - The Madras High Court of India moved to ban conversion therapy in the country. Delivering his verdict for the case S Sushma v. Commissioner of Police, Justice N Anand Venkatesh suggested comprehensive measures to sensitize society and various branches of the State including the Police and judiciary to remove prejudices against the LGBTQIA+ community. The court suggested that changes be made to curricula of schools and universities to educate students on understanding issues surrounding the LGBTQIA+ community.
- 15 - The Hungarian parliament passes a law that bans the 'promotion' of homosexuality and gender change to children in schools, films or books. It is similar to the Russian gay propaganda law passed in Russia in 2013.
- 16 - The Mexican State of Sinaloa legalizes same-sex marriage after past attempts to legalize it failed. The Mexican Supreme Court ordered the state to legalize same-sex marriage in 2019. The state will officially begin to recognize same-sex relationships by the end of 2021.

=== July ===
- 11 - The Israeli High Court ruled that the amendment to the Surrogacy Law enacted in 2018, which discriminates against same-sex couples, will be amended by a High Court order, and will enter into force within six months.

=== September ===
- 26 - Swiss Voters approve Same-Sex Marriage in a nationwide referendum. A 64.1% of voters accepted the reform, and none of the 26 Swiss cantons came out against it. The most hesitant canton was Appenzell Inner Rhoden, where 50.8% accepted the reform, while the referendum was most popular in Basel City with 74% voting yes.

=== October ===
- 19 - The Legislative Assembly of Rondônia approved Law No. 5,123, which prohibits the teaching of gender-neutral language in schools in the Brazilian state.

=== November ===
- 5 - In Spain, an executive order was signed to allow free IVF treatment for single women and women in same-sex relationships throughout country. A bill has been formally introduced to implement the decision permanently.
- 10 - In Italy, a new infrastracture law comes into force which, among other things, outlaws exposing advertisements with homophobic or transphobic messages on streets or on vehicles.
- 29 - In Botswana the Botswana Appeals Court upheld the High Court's ruling decriminalising gay sex.
- 30 - In Chile the Chamber of Deputies of Chile approved a bill to allow same-sex marriages on 23 November. The Senate of Chile supported the bill on 30 November.

=== December ===
- 7 - Canada makes providing, promoting or advertising conversion therapy, to children, consenting adults and non-consenting adults, a criminal offence. The bill defines conversion therapy as the “practice, treatment or service designed to change a person’s sexual orientation to heterosexual, or to change a person’s gender identity to cisgender.” The law will allow courts to authorize the seizure or removal of online content advertising the practice.
