= 2025 in LGBTQ rights =

This is a list of notable events in the history of LGBTQ rights taking place in the year 2025.

== Events ==
=== January ===
- 1 – A law allowing same-sex marriages comes into effect in Liechtenstein.
- 20 –
  - President of the United States Donald Trump signs an executive order entitled "Defending Women from Gender Ideology Extremism and Restoring Biological Truth to the Federal Government".
  - It would require federal departments to recognize sex as a male-female binary only (determined by biological sex assigned at conception), replace all instances of "gender" with "sex" in materials, cease all funding for gender-affirming care, cease allowing gender self-identification on federal documents such as passports, cease the funding or promotion of "gender ideology", cease the application of Bostock v. Clayton County as to provide Title VII protection based on gender identity in federal activities and prohibit transgender people from using single-sex federally funded facilities congruent with their gender.
- 23 – A law allowing same-sex marriages comes into effect in Thailand.
- 27 – The Idaho House of Representatives votes for a resolution that calls for the US Supreme Court to reconsider its 2015 Obergefell v. Hodges same sex marriage decision.
- 28 – President of the United States Donald Trump signs an executive order entitled "Protecting Children from Chemical and Surgical Mutilation". According to The New York Times, the executive order takes steps "to end gender-affirming medical treatments for children and teenagers under 19, directing agencies to take a variety of steps to curtail surgeries, hormone therapy and other regimens."
- 29 – President of the United States Donald Trump signs an executive order entitled "Ending Radical Indoctrination in K-12 Schooling". The order directs the federal government to rescind federal funding from schools that "directly or indirectly support or subsidize the social transition of a minor student," including allowing students to use bathrooms that align with their gender identity or permitting teachers to use names or pronouns different from those assigned at birth.

=== February ===
- 5 –
  - President of the United States Donald Trump signs an executive order entitled "Keeping Men Out of Women's Sports", which directs the government to interpret federal Title IX rules as the prohibition of transgender girls and women from participating in female sports.
  - Argentinian presidential spokesperson Manuel Adorni announces that the President Javier Milei has signed a decree modifying the 2012 Gender Identity Law, that allows transgender people to be treated according to their gender identity and have their documents be registered with the corresponding name and gender, to exclude people under the age of 18 to access gender-affirming care.
- 28 – Iowa Governor Kim Reynolds signs Senate File 418, which eliminated gender identity as a protected class from the Iowa Civil Rights Act. This made Iowa the first U.S. state to remove gender identity as a protected class from a civil rights law.

=== March ===
- 18 – The Hungarian parliament votes 136–27 to ban LGBTQ events in the country, including the annual Budapest Pride event.
- 28 – Utah becomes the first US state to ban LGBTQ pride flags in government buildings and schools.

=== April ===
- 4 – On 4 April 2025, Roman-Catholic bishop conference in Germany published after Fiducia supplicans by pope Francis a document, in which blessing ceremonies for same-sex unions are allowed. In the document are helping hints, which church songs or which biblicals texts can be used.
- 14 – Hungarian Parliament passes constitutional amendments outlawing public events by the LGBTQ+ community and mandating the existence of only two genders (male or female).
- 16 –
  - The Supreme Court of the United Kingdom rules that the legal definition of woman for the purposes of the Equality Act 2010 is based on biological sex, excluding transgender women from the definition.
  - Brazil's Federal Council of Medicine (CFM) passed a resolution banning gender-affirming care for minors and reducing the age for gender affirming surgical procedures from 25 to 21.
- 17 – The Constitutional Court of Lithuania granted same-sex couples the right to register their partnership with the courts until the Seimas adopts a comprehensive law on registered partnerships.
- 30 – The last LGBT-free zone in Poland is abolished.

=== May ===
- 22 – Automatic parenthood on birth certificates for children of lesbian partnerships is recognized by the Constitutional Court in Italy.

=== June ===
- 2 – The Supreme Court of Puerto Rico ruled that people can request their birth certificate gender marker be changed to X.
- 18 – The US Supreme Court votes 6–3 to uphold a Tennessee law to ban gender-affirming care for minors, allowing individual states to implement similar bans.
- 25 – The Federal Court of Acre blocked the Federal Council of Medicine's resolution, restoring gender-affirming care for minors nationwide in Brazil.

=== July ===
- 17 – Puerto Rico implements a ban on gender-affirming care for anyone under 21 years of age. It also bars public funding for gender-affirming care and threatens doctors who violate the ban with up to 15 years in prison, a $50,000 fine, and the permanent loss of their licenses. Puerto Rico's LGBTQ+ Federation immediately announced plans to challenge the ban in court.
- 18 – Cuba's National Assembly of People’s Power approved a law to allow transgender people to self-declare their gender on official documents without requiring surgery.
- 29 – Saint Lucia's High Court issued a ruling decriminalizing homosexual acts.

=== September ===
- 1 – Burkina Faso passes a law criminalizing homosexuality, providing sentences of between two and five years in prison as well as fines.
- 26 – The National Council of Slovakia passes the government's constitutional amendment. It will formally recognize only two genders (Male and female), restrict "gender transition" and prohibit the adoption of children by same-sex couples.

=== October ===
- 2 – Brazilian Federal Judge Flávio Dino overturned the Federal Court of Acre's decision and reinstated the CFM's resolution that banned gender-affirming care of minors in the country.

=== November ===
- 7 – The United States Supreme Court decides not to entertain a challenge against same-sex marriage.
- 17 – Brazilian President Luiz Inácio Lula da Silva has signed a law prohibiting the use of gender-neutral language in government institutions.
- 19 – New Zealand announces a ban on puberty blockers for minors with gender dysphoria set to take effect on December 19, 2025. Minors with gender dysphoria already on puberty blockers will be able to continue them and the drug will also remain available for other uses like early onset puberty. The Minster cited the Cass Review in his decision and said the ban will remain in place until the completion of the United Kingdom's clinical trial on puberty blockers.
- 25 – Top EU court rules same-sex marriages must be recognised across bloc (Poland, Bulgaria, Romania and Slovakia).

=== December ===
- 30 – Kazakhstan President Kassym-Jomart Tokayev signs into law Kazakh anti-LGBTQ law. The law is similar to the one adopted in Russia.
