= Nimrod Ping =

British architect and politician

- Born: 19 September 1947
- Died: 3 July 2006 (aged 58)
- Education: Royal Grammar School, High Wycombe; Cardiff University
- Occupations: Architect, politician, gay activist

Nimrod Ping (19 September 1947 - 3 July 2006) was a British architect, politician and gay activist in Brighton, East Sussex, England.

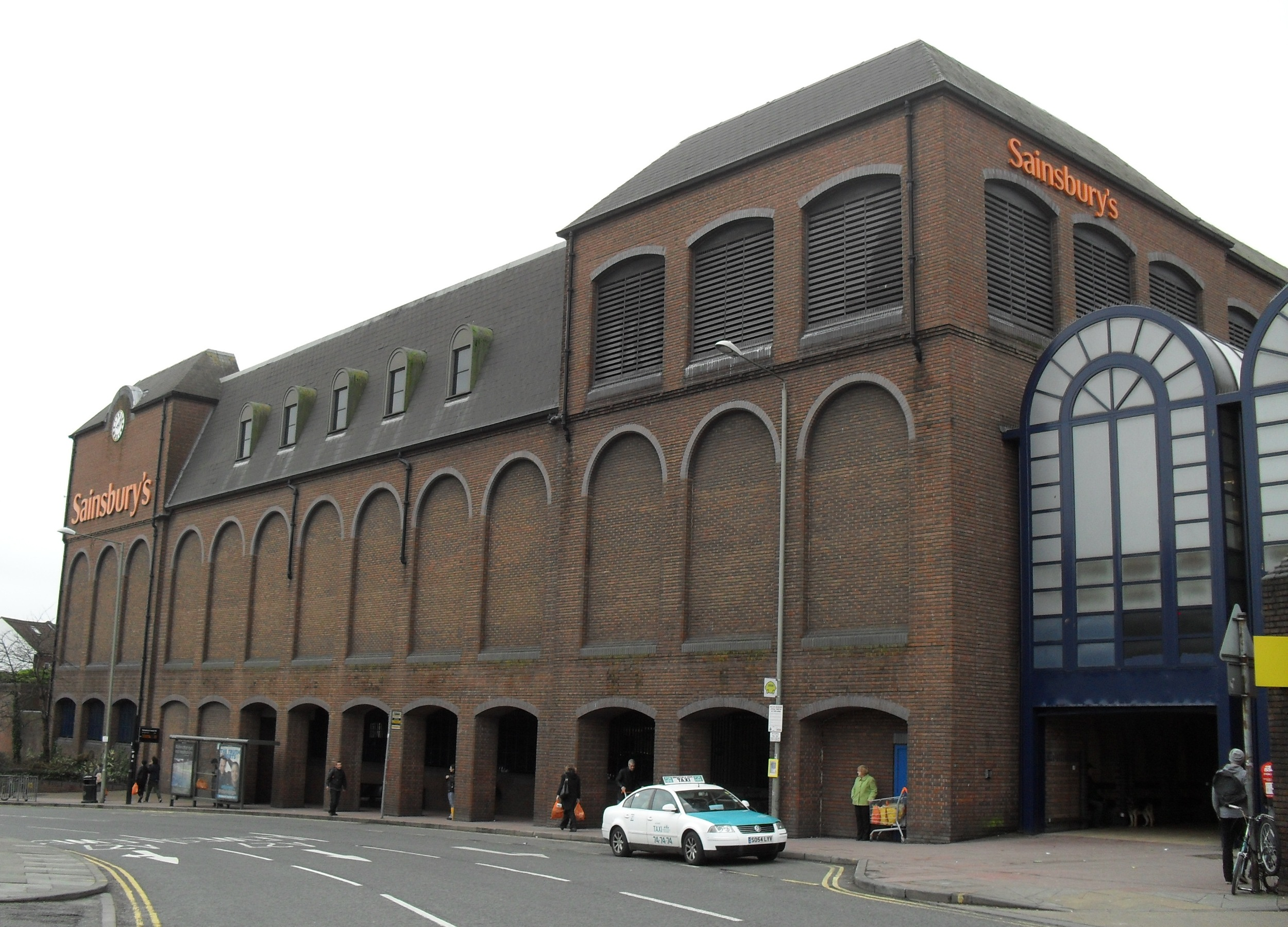
Sainsbury's store at Lewes Road, Brighton, designed by Nimrod Ping

== Biography ==
=== Early life ===
After attending the Royal Grammar School, High Wycombe from 1964 to 1966 he studied architecture at Cardiff University.

=== Career ===
As an architect, he designed a Sainsbury's supermarket in Lewes Road, Brighton.

=== Politics ===
Ping served as a councillor at Brighton Borough Council (now Brighton and Hove City Council) for eight years from 1991 to 1999. He became chairman of the council's planning committee and of its licensing committee. Thanks to his unusual name, he achieved national fame after the BBC Radio 2 presenter Terry Wogan used his name as scale against which to compare other interesting names.

He was one of the first openly gay councillors in Britain. He took part in Brighton's Pride events for a number of years. He convinced other councillors to allow gay clubs in Brighton to stay open after midnight.

He was diagnosed with hepatitis C in the late 1990s. He became known locally as the face of southern England's hepatitis C campaign.

Originally a Labour Party supporter, he joined the Green Party a few months before his death.

=== Death ===
Ping died of hepatitis-related liver failure in 2006. His funeral took place at St Margaret's Church in Rottingdean on 20 July 2006, where his gravestone reads "'Architect, Musician and Troublemaker' Arrived late, left too early, d. 3 July 2006".
