= 2024 in LGBTQ rights =

This is a list of notable events in the history of LGBTQ rights that took place in the year 2024.

== Events ==
=== January ===
- 1 – Same-sex marriage becomes legal in Estonia.
- 9 – Gabriel Attal is appointed Prime Minister of France, becoming the country's first openly gay head of government.

=== February ===
- 15 – Greece's Parliament passes a bill legalizing same-sex marriages by a vote of 175 to 77.
- 16 – Greece's same-sex marriage law comes into force.
- 22 – Westlock, Alberta (Canada) gets a majority vote to ban pride flags.
- 28 – The Parliament of Ghana passes a widespread anti-LGBT bill making the promotion or advocacy of LGBT rights punishable by five years in prison.
- 29 – Australia's Cumberland City Council votes to ban drag queen storytime from council events.

=== March ===
- 22 – The Government of New South Wales bans conversion therapy, including for citizens out of state.
- 27 – The House of Representatives of Thailand passes a preliminary bill legalizing same-sex marriages by a vote of 400 to 10.

=== April ===
- 12 – Germany's parliament passes a law easing legal procedures for changing names and gender identity by a vote of 374 to 251.
- 17 – Sweden's parliament passes a law lowering the minimum age to legally change gender from 18 to 16 by a vote of 234 to 94.
- 19 – Czech Republic, same-sex partnerships get more rights in income taxes, social security and stepchild adoptions. The reform comes into effect on 1 January 2025.
- 23 – Dominica's High Court issued a ruling decriminalizing homosexual acts.
- 27 – Iraq's parliament votes to criminalize same-sex relationships, to be punishable by a maximum of 15 years in prison.

=== May ===
- 1 –
  - The United Methodist Church (UMC) allows same-sex marriages in their churches and strikes down its 40-year ban on gay clergy.
  - Australia's Cumberland City Council votes in favour of removing books about same-sex parenting in council libraries.
- 15 – Australia's Cumberland City Council repeals the ban on books about same-sex parenting in council libraries, passed 14 days earlier.
- 16 – The Landtag of Liechtenstein repeals the ban on same-sex marriages. The bill comes into effect on January 1, 2025.

=== June ===
- 18 – The Senate of Thailand approves the same-sex marriage bill by a vote of 130 to 4.
- 21 – Namibia's High Court issued a ruling decriminalizing homosexual acts.

=== July ===
- 1 –
  - Denmark – Blood donations by MSMs becomes legal. On July 1, 2024, Denmark lifted its four-month deferral that was specifically aimed toward MSM blood donors.
  - Czech Republic – Blood donations by MSMs becomes legal. The Ministry of Health in the Czech Republic is revising its blood donation guidelines for hospitals.
- 12 – The Supreme Court of the Netherlands rules that same-sex marriage is legal in Aruba and Curaçao.

=== August ===
- 7 – The Bulgarian National Assembly votes in favor of a legislative amendment banning the teaching of LGBTQ related topics in schools.
- 28 – India's Ministry of Finance issued an advisory declaring that persons from the LGBTQ community face no restrictions in opening joint bank accounts or nominating their partners as beneficiaries.

=== September ===
- 17 – The Georgian Parliament votes in favor of passing laws introduced by Georgian Dream party curtailing LGBT rights.
- 18 – In Kentucky, conversion therapy becomes banned
- 24 – Thailand's king has signed a marriage equality bill into law, making Thailand the first country in South East Asia to recognize same-sex marriage.

=== October ===
- 3 – The Georgian Parliament speaker signs the anti-LGBT rights bill into law.

=== November ===
- 30 – In Honduras, blood donations by MSMs becomes legal. Executive Agreement 002-2024 struck down the ban on LGBTQ+ blood donations in Honduras.

=== December ===
- 3 – The Alberta legislature passes 3 bills regarding transgender individuals. One banning doctors from treating minors under 16 with puberty blockers or hormone therapy, one banning transgender athletes from competing in female sports, and another one requiring children under 16 to have parental consent if they want to change their names or pronouns at school.
