= Court of Justice of Maranhão =

- Established: 1813; 213 years ago
- Jurisdiction: Maranhão
- Location: São Luís, Maranhão
- Authorised by: Brazilian Constitution
- Website: www.tjma.jus.br

Court of Justice of Maranhão (in Portuguese: Tribunal de Justiça do Maranhão, or TJMA) is the highest court in the Brazilian state of Maranhão. The judicial court has federal judges to monitor and combat corruption. The current president is federal judge, Tyrone Silva.
