= Sarah White Norman and Mary Vincent Hammon =

Two English colonists prosecuted for lesbianism

Sarah White Norman (ca. 1623–1654) and Mary Vincent Hammon (1633–1705) were prosecuted in 1648 for "lewd behavior with each other upon a bed"; their trial documents are the only known record of sex between female English colonists in North America in the 17th century. Mary was admonished, while Sarah was convicted. This may be the only conviction for lesbianism in American history.

== Biographies ==
=== Sarah White Norman ===
Sarah White was born c. 1623. On October 8, 1639, she married Hugh Norman, the son of Hugh Norman (d. 1623) and Agnes Wolcott (b. c. 1579). Their daughter Elizabeth, born in 1642, drowned in a well on May 28, 1648, at the age of six. They had at least two other children, Phillis and Ann.

=== Mary Vincent Hammon ===
Mary Vincent married Benjamin Hammon on November 8, 1648, in Sandwich. Benjamin Hammon had emigrated from London in 1634.

== Prosecution and trial ==
Richard Berry (1626–1681), a neighbor, accused the two women, and one man, Teage Joanes, of "sodomy and other unclean practices". Later Berry said he had borne false witness against Joanes, but he did not withdraw what he said against Sarah White Norman. Three years later, the same Berry and other men, including Joanes, were prosecuted for homosexuality, and ordered to "part their uncivil living together".

The two women were prosecuted for "lewd behavior with each other upon a bed" in 1648. Hammon was only admonished, possibly because she was only 15 years old at the time of the charges. Sarah, who was probably 10 years older, stood trial. She was convicted in 1650 and required to acknowledge publicly her "unchaste behavior" with Mary, as well as warned against future offenses.

At the General Court of Our Sovereign Lord the King, Holden at Plymouth Aforesaid, the Sixth of March (1648)

We present the wife of Hugh Norman, and Mary Hammon, both of Yarmouth, for lewd behavior each with other upon a bed. Mary Hammon cleared with admonition.

At the General Court Holden at New Plymouth, the Sixth of March (1649)

Whereas, at the General Court, holden at Plymouth aforesaid, the 29th of October, 1649, Richard Berry accused Teage Joanes of sodomy and other unclean practises also with Sara, the wife of Hugh Norman, and for that cause the said parties were both bound over to answer at this Court, and accordingly appeared. The said Richard Berry acknowledged before the Court that he did wrong the aforesaid Teage Joanes in both the aforesaid particulars, and had borne false witness against him upon oath; and for the same the said Richard Berry was sentenced to be whipped at the post, which accordingly was performed.

At the General Court Holden at New Plymouth, the Second of October (1650)

Whereas the wife of Hugh Norman of Yarmouth hath stood presented divers Courts for misdemeanor and lewd behavior with Mary Hammon upon a bed, with divers lascivious speeches by her also spoken, but she could not appear by reason of some hindrances until this Court, the said Court have therefore sentenced her, the said wife of Hugh Norman, for her vild behavior in the aforesaid particulars, to make a public acknowledgment, so far as conveniently may be, of her unchaste behavior, and have also warned her to take heed of such carriages for the future, lest her former carriage come in remembrance against her to make her punishment the greater.

== Aftermath ==
Hugh Norman left Sarah and their children, moving back to England. He subsequently lived at Orchard Portman, near Taunton, wasting all his money and dying in poverty. There are no known records of Sarah and her children's fate after he left, though surviving documents related to Hugh suggest that the family was likely impoverished by his desertion.

Mary and her husband reconciled and had a number of children: Samuel (b. 1655), John (1663–1749), Nathan (b. 1670), Benjamin (1673–1747), Rose (d. 1676), Mary (d. young). In 1652, Benjamin Hammon Sr. was chosen constable of Yarmouth. By 1673 he is documented as a landowner in Sandwich, and in 1675 he became constable there. He moved to Rochester sometime between its founding (as Sippican) in 1679, and 1686, when his son Samuel was admitted freeman there.

Benjamin Hammon died in Rochester, Massachusetts, on August 27, 1703, and Mary Hammon died two years later in 1705.

== See also ==
- History of lesbianism
