= 1984 in LGBTQ rights =

This is a list of notable events in the history of LGBT rights that took place in the year 1984.

== Events ==
- Laguna Beach, California, prohibits employment discrimination based on sexual orientation in the private sector.
- Oakland, California, prohibits employment discrimination based on sexual orientation in the private sector.
- In Australia, homosexual acts between consenting adults are decriminalized in New South Wales and the Northern Territory.

=== March ===
- 14 — The United States Court of Appeals for the Tenth Circuit in National Gay Task Force v. Board of Education of the City of Oklahoma City rules that a statute allowing teachers to be fired for "advocating, soliciting, imposing, encouraging or promoting public or private homosexual activity in a manner that creates a substantial risk that such conduct will come to the attention of school children or school employees" is facially overbroad and infringes on First Amendment rights.

=== November ===
- 10 — In the United Kingdom, Chris Smith comes out as gay, becoming the first openly gay member of the House of Commons.
- 29 — West Hollywood, California, approves a gay rights ordinance.

=== December ===
- 5 — Berkeley, California, extends domestic partnership benefits to the same-sex partners of city employees.

== See also ==
- Timeline of LGBT history — timeline of events from 12,000 BCE to present
- LGBT rights by country or territory — current legal status around the world
- LGBT social movements
