= 1972 in LGBTQ rights =

This is a list of notable events in the history of LGBT rights that took place in the year 1972.

== Events ==
- San Francisco prohibits employment discrimination based on sexual orientation in the public sector. The city also prohibits companies that have contracts with the city from discriminating based on sexual orientation.
- The U.S. state of Ohio repeals its sodomy law.

=== January ===
- 1 — U.S. state of Hawaii repeals its sodomy law.

=== March ===
- 1 - Different parts of Norway legalize homosexual activity and age of consents becomes equal.
- 7 — East Lansing, Michigan, becomes the first United States city to ban discrimination against homosexuals in housing, public accommodation, and employment.

=== April ===
- 1 — U.S. state of Delaware decriminalizes consensual homosexual acts between adults.
- 5 - Lithuania, Georgia, Estonia, Turkmenistan, Latvia, Belarus, Ukraine, Kazakhstan, Uzbekistan, Kyrgyzstan, Tajikistan, Azerbaijan, and Armenia, all a part of the Soviet Union, recognizes the right to change legal gender with surgery.
- 21 - In Sweden, it becomes legal to change genders, but requires surgery.
- 21 - In Norway, homosexuality is decriminalized.

=== June ===
- 27 — Gay News, the first gay magazine in the United Kingdom, publishes its first issue.

=== July ===
- 1 — The U.K. Gay Liberation Front holds the first ever U.K. Gay Pride in London.
- 12 — Delegates Jim Foster and Madeline Davis become the first openly LGBT people to address a major U.S. political party's convention at the 1972 Democratic National Convention.
- 24 — Peter Maloney announces his candidacy for the Toronto Board of Education in the Toronto municipal election, 1972, becoming Canada's first known openly gay political candidate.

=== October ===
- 10 — The United States Supreme Court issues its ruling in Baker v. Nelson, in which the plaintiffs sought to have Minnesota's restriction of marriage to different-sex couples declared unconstitutional. The Court dismisses the case "for want of a substantial federal question".

== Deaths ==
- August 2 — Paul Goodman, U.S. poet, writer, and public intellectual. The freedom with which Goodman revealed, in print and in public, his homosexual life and loves proved to be one of the many important cultural springboards for the emerging gay liberation movement of the early 1970s.
- December 31 — Henry Gerber, German-born American LGBT rights activist. Founded the Society for Human Rights, the first LGBT organization in the United States.

== See also ==
- Timeline of LGBT history — timeline of events from 12,000 BCE to present
- LGBT rights by country or territory — current legal status around the world
- LGBT social movements
