= Baker v. Wade =

U.S. court case on sodomy

- Court: United States Court of Appeals for the Fifth Circuit
- Full case name: Donald F. Baker, Plaintiff-Appellee, v. Henry Wade, District Attorney of Dallas County, Texas, Etc., et al., Defendants, Danny E. Hill, 47th District Attorney, Defendant-Appellant
- Decided: August 26, 1985
- Citations: 563 F.Supp 1121 (N.D. Tex. 1982), rev'd 769 F.2nd 289 (5th Cir. 1985) (en banc) cert denied 478 US 1022 (1986)

Case opinions
- The right to privacy does not cover acts of homosexual sodomy. The Texas sodomy law does not violate due process.

Baker v. Wade 563 F.Supp 1121 (N.D. Tex. 1982), rev'd 769 F.2nd 289 (5th Cir. 1985) (en banc) cert denied 478 US 1022 (1986) is a federal lawsuit challenging the legality of the sodomy law of the state of Texas. Plaintiff Donald Baker contended that the law violated his rights to privacy and equal protection. After a victory at trial, an appellate court reversed the lower court's decision and in the wake of its decision in Bowers v. Hardwick the Supreme Court of the United States refused to review it.

== Background ==
In 1974, Texas adopted a revised Penal Code which included section 21.06: "A person commits an offense if he engages in deviate sexual intercourse with another individual of the same sex." The law carried a maximum penalty of $200 but the existence of the law served to stigmatize LGBT residents of Texas as criminals. In 1976 in Doe v. Commonwealth's Attorney of Richmond (425 US 901) the United States Supreme Court upheld the sodomy law of the Commonwealth of Virginia as constitutional. A number of gay rights organizations in Texas sought to repeal the state's sodomy law legislatively but were unsuccessful. The Texas Human Rights Foundation (THRF), composed largely of attorneys from across the state, believed that the Doe case failed because the plaintiff was anonymous, and so conducted a search to find someone to be the named (and visible) plaintiff in a test case to challenge the law on Constitutional grounds before the federal court in Dallas, Texas. Donald F. Baker, president of the Dallas Gay Alliance and a Dallas teacher who had lost his job with the Dallas Independent School District after coming out in a television interview, agreed to be the sole plaintiff, and the suit was filed on November 19, 1979, in the United States District Court for the Northern District of Texas. The suit named Dallas County District Attorney Henry Wade and Dallas city attorney Lee Holt as defendants and, because THRF wanted any affirmative ruling to apply statewide, included each of the 1,085 city, county and district attorneys in the state as part of the defendant class. The Texas Attorney General's office intervened on behalf of the state, but no one else in the defendant class intervened.

The case went to trial before US District Judge Jerry Buchmeyer in June 1981 and lasted two days. On August 17, 1982, Buchmeyer ruled in favor of Baker on constitutional grounds, finding that the law violated Baker's right to personal privacy and equal protection under the laws.

== Appeals ==
Wade decided not to appeal but Attorney General Mark White filed an appeal on November 1, 1982. Following an election later that month, the new Attorney General, Jim Mattox, withdrew the appeal. The Texas Constitution invests the power to represent the state in civil litigation solely with the Attorney General, so withdrawing the appeal ordinarily would have ended the case. However, district attorney Danny Hill, recently elected to represent Potter County, along with a group of physicians called "Dallas Doctors Against AIDS", petitioned the court to force the state to appeal. Judge Buchmeyer denied the petition, as did a panel of the Fifth Circuit Court of Appeals, but the full Fifth Circuit voted to hear Hill's appeal. On August 26, 1985, the Fifth Circuit voted 9−7 to reverse the district court and uphold the sodomy statute. On October 23 the Court denied Baker's request for a re-hearing.

On January 18, 1986, Laurence Tribe filed a writ of certiorari on Baker's behalf with the United States Supreme Court. The attorneys general of 26 states, including 10 states with sodomy laws, urged the Court to take the case, arguing that the Court should reject the intervention of the Fifth Circuit because the decision of a state attorney general to withdraw an appeal should have ended its consideration. By the time the writ was filed, the Supreme Court had accepted Bowers v. Hardwick, a challenge to Georgia sodomy law, which criminalized all sodomy regardless of the gender or marital status of the individuals involved in the conduct. The Court upheld Georgia's sodomy law on June 30, 1986, ruling that there was no privacy right to engage in sodomy. The Supreme Court denied certiorari on July 7.

The Texas sodomy law persisted until 2003, when the Supreme Court struck it and every remaining state anti-sodomy law down in Lawrence v. Texas.
