= Timeline of LGBTQ history =

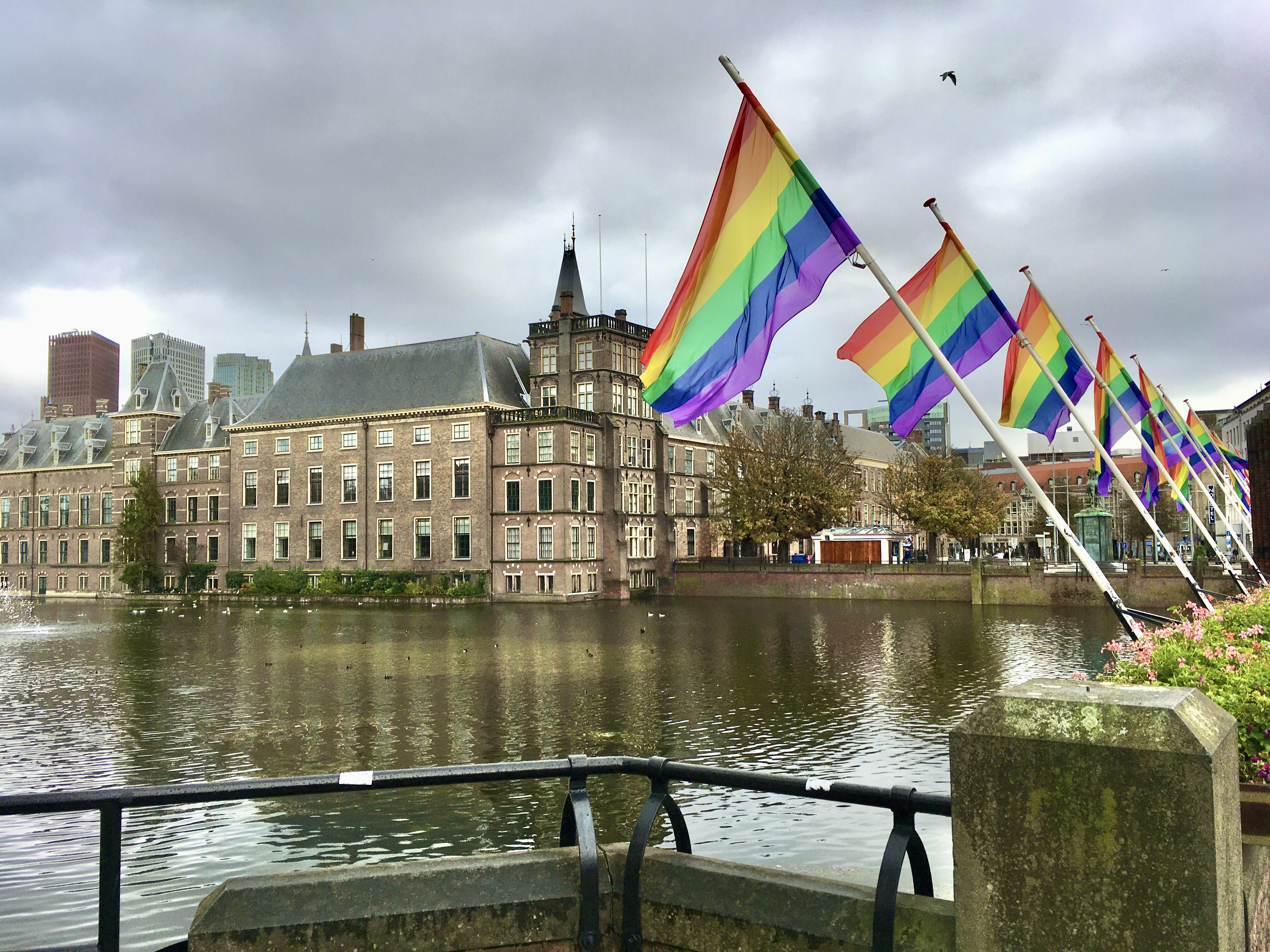
Rainbow flags in the Netherlands where Queen Beatrix signed a law to make it the first country to legalize same-sex marriage.

The following is the timeline of lesbian, gay, bisexual, transgender, and queer (LGBTQ) people's history.

== Before the Common Era ==
=== 9th millennium BC – 3rd millennium BC ===
==== 101st century BC – 50th century BC ====
- c. 9,600 BC – c, 5,000 BC – Mesolithic rock art in the Grotta dell'Addaura in Sicily depicts male figures in hives that have been interpreted variously, including as hunters, acrobats, religious initiates, and gay sex.

==== 70th century BC – 17th century BC ====
- c. 1980 – Among the sexual depictions in Neolithic and Bronze Age drawings and figurines from the Mediterranean area, as one author describes it, a "third sex" human figure having female breasts and male genitals or without distinguishing sex characteristics. In Neolithic Italy, female images are found in a domestic context, while images that combine sexual characteristics appear in burials or religious settings. In Neolithic Greece and Cyprus, figures are often dual-sexed or without identifying sexual characteristics.

=== 3rd millennium BC ===
==== 29th century BC – 25th century BC ====
- c. 2900 BC – c. 2500 BC – A burial of a suburb of Prague, Czech Republic, a male is buried in the outfit usually reserved for women. Archaeologists speculate that the burial corresponds to a transgender person or someone of the third sex.

==== 24th century BC ====
- c. 2400 BC – Khnumhotep and Niankhkhnum are believed by some observers to be the first same-sex couple in recorded history.

==== 23rd century BC or 23rd century BC – 22nd century BC ====
- 2284 BC – 2246 BC or 2184 BC – Pepi II Neferkare, who ruled the Kingdom of Egypt as an absolute monarch under the title of Pharaoh of Egypt, is believed to have had a homosexual interpretation around nocturnal visits to his General Sasenet, though others argue that it was more likely that the story was intended to tarnish the reputation of the Pharaoh by associating him with homosexuality.

=== 2nd millennium BC ===
==== 15th century BC – 12th century BC ====
- c. 1500 BC – c. 1101 BC – The Code of the Assura during the Middle Assyrian Empire prescribes on various topics, including male rape: "If a man has secretly started a rumour about his neighbor saying, "He has allowed men to have sex with him," or in a quarrel has told him in the presence of others, "Men have sex with you," and then, "I will bring charges against you myself," but is then unable to substantiate the charge, and cannot prove it, that man is to be caned, be sentenced to a month's hard labour for the king, be cut off, and pay one talent of lead." (§19) "If a man has had sex with his neighbor he has been charged and convicted, he is to be considered defiled and made into a eunuch." (§20) "If a man violates his own mother, it is a capital crime. If a man violates his daughter, it is a capital crime. If a man violates his son, it is capital crime." (§189)

=== 1st millennium BC ===
==== 10th century BC – 6th century BC ====
- c. 1000 BC – c. 500 BC – The Vendidad dates from this period and within the text it states the following:

"Ahura Mazda answered: 'The man that lies with mankind as man lies with womankind, or as woman lies with mankind, is the man that is a Daeva; this one is the man that is a worshipper of the Daevas, that is a male paramour of the Daevas, that is a female paramour of the Daevas, that is a wife to the Daeva; this is the man that is as bad as a Daeva, that is in his whole being a Daeva; this is the man that is a Daeva before he dies, and becomes one of the unseen Daevas after death: so is he, whether he has lain with mankind as mankind, or as womankind."

— Avesta, Vendidad, Fargard 8. Funerals and purification, unlawful sex, Section V (32) Unlawful lusts.

The guilty may be killed by any one, without an order from the Dastur, and by this execution an ordinary capital crime may be redeemed.

==== 7th century BC ====
- c. 700 BC – The custom of castrating homosexual (and straight) slaves and house servants is introduced into Anshan from conquered territories of the Neo-Assyrian Empire and the Median Empire.
- c. 630 BC – Dorian aristocrats in Crete adopt formal relations between adult aristocrats and adolescent boys; an inscription from Crete is the oldest record of the social institution of paiderastia among the Greeks. Marriage between men in Greece was not legally recognized, but men might form lifelong relationships originating in paiderastia ("pederasty," without the pejorative connotations of the English word). These partnerships were not dissimilar to heterosexual marriages except that the older person served as educator or mentor.
- Sappho, a Greek lyric poet born on the island of Lesbos, was born between 630 and 612 BC, and died around 570 BC. The Alexandrians included her in the list of nine lyric poets. She was famous for her lesbian themes, giving her name and that of her homeland to the very definition of lesbianism (and the lesser used term of "sapphism"). She was exiled c. 600 BC unrelated to lesbianism. She was later permitted to return.

==== 6th century BC ====
- 534 – 492 BC – Duke Ling of Wey and Mizi Xia had a loving same-sex relationship, where various plays and stories have commemorated their love story in the phrase, "the bitten peach".
- c. 540 – 530 BC – Wall paintings from the Etruscan Tomb of the Bulls (Italian: Tomba dei Tori), found in 1892 in the Monterozzi necropolis, Tarquinia, depict homosexual intercourse. The tomb is named for the pair of bulls who watch human sex scenes, one between a man and a woman, and the other between two men; these may be apotropaic, or embody aspects of the cycle of regeneration and the afterlife. The three-chamber tomb was inscribed with the name of the deceased for whom it was originally built, Aranth Spurianas or Arath Spuriana, and also depicts Achilles killing the Trojan prince Troilus, along with indications of Apollo cult.
- 521 BC – The Achaemenid Empire crucifies Polycrates and suppresses pederasty in Samos, which causes pederastic poets Ibycus and Anacreon to flee Samos.

==== 5th century BC ====
- c. 486 BC – King Darius I adopts the Holiness Code of Leviticus for Persian Jews of the Achaemenid Empire, enacting the first ever state sanctioned death penalty for male same-sex relationships.
- c. 440 BC – Herodotus publishes Histories, stating in the book that Persians welcomed foreign customs, including adopting pederasty from the Greeks.

==== 4th century BC ====
- 385 BC – Plato publishes Symposium in which Phaedrus, Eryximachus, Aristophanes and other Greek intellectuals argue that love between males is the highest form, while sex with women is lustful and utilitarian. Socrates, however, differs. He demonstrates extreme self-control when seduced by the beautiful Alcibiades.
- 350 BC – Plato publishes Laws in which the Athenian stranger and his companions criticize homosexuality as being lustful and wrong for society because it does not further the species and may lead to irresponsible citizenry.
- 346 BC - Aeschines' speech Against Timarchus, who was on trial for male prostitution, reveals Athenian attitudes to homosexuality.
- 338 BC – The Sacred Band of Thebes, a previously undefeated elite battalion made up of one hundred and fifty pederastic couples, is destroyed by the forces of Philip II of Macedon who bemoans their loss and praises their honour.

==== 3rd or 2nd century BC ====
- 227 BC, 226 BC, 216 BC, or 149 BC – During the Roman Republic, the Lex Scantinia imposed penalties on those who committed a sex crime (stuprum) against a freeborn youth; infrequently mentioned or enforced, it may also have been used to prosecute male citizens who willingly took the passive role in homosexual relations. It is unclear whether the penalty was death or a fine. For an adult male citizen to desire and engage in same-sex relations was considered natural and socially acceptable, as long as his partner was a male prostitute (amasius), slave (concubinus) or infamis, a person excluded from the legal protections accorded a citizen. In the Imperial period, the Lex Scantinia was revived by Domitian as part of his program of judicial and moral reform.

==== 1st century BC ====
- c. 90s – 80s BC – Quintus Lutatius Catulus was among a circle of poets who made short, light Hellenistic poems fashionable in the late Republic. Both his surviving epigrams address a male as an object of desire, signaling a new homoerotic aesthetic in Roman culture.
- 57 – 54 BC – Catullus writes the Carmina, including love poems to Juventius, boasting of sexual prowess with youth and violent invectives against "passive" homosexuals.
- c. 50 BC – The Lex Julia de vi publica, a Roman Republic law, was passed to define rape as forced sex against "boy, woman, or anyone" and the rapist was subject to execution. Men who had been raped were exempt from the loss of legal or social standing suffered by those who submitted their bodies to use for the pleasure of others; a male prostitute or entertainer was infamis and excluded from the legal protections extended to citizens in good standing. As a matter of law, a slave could not be raped; he was considered property and not legally a person. The slave's owner, however, could prosecute the rapist for property damage. • See also Digest 48.5.35 [34] on legal definitions of rape that included boys.</ref>
- 46 BC – Lucius Antonius, the brother of Mark Antony, accuses Gaius Octavius for having "given himself to Aulus Hirtius in Spain for three hundred thousand sesterces."
- 44 BC – After the assassination of Dictator and Consul Gaius Julius Caesar, Gaius Octavius is publicly named in Caesar's will as his adopted son and heir. According to Mark Antony, he charged that Octavius had earned his adoption by Caesar through sexual favors.
- 42 – 39 BC – Virgil writes the Eclogues, with Eclogue 2 a notable example of homoerotic Latin literature.
- 27 BC – The Roman Empire is established under the rule of Augustus. The first recorded same-sex marriage occurs during his reign, homosexual prostitution is taxed, and if someone is caught being sexually passive with another male, a Roman citizen could lose his citizenship.
- 26, 25 and 18 BC – Tibullus writes his elegies, with references to homosexuality.
- 7 – 1 BC – Emperor Ai of Han had a loving same-sex relationship with Dong Xian. In one historical record, Emperor Ai cut his own sleeves to not wake up his beloved Dong Xian.

== Common Era ==
=== 1st millennium ===
==== 1st century ====
- Philo of Alexandria and Marcus Manilius provided descriptions of transgender people during the early Roman Empire. Philo stated: "Expending every possible care on their outward adornment, they are not ashamed even to employ every device to change artificially their nature as men into women". He also attested that some members of this group, to that end, had their penises removed.
- 5 –15 CE – The Warren Cup is made – a Roman silver drinking cup decorated in relief with two images of male same-sex acts.
- 37 – 41 – Under the reign of Roman emperor Gaius Julius Caesar Augustus Germanicus, taxation on prostitution is enacted throughout the Roman Empire. Caligula also either exiled or contemplated exiling spintriae from Rome. Gaius Suetonius Tranquillus reports that Caligula could only be restrained with difficulty, after lengthy pleadings, from having the spintriae thrown into the sea.
- 54 – Nero becomes Emperor of Rome. Nero married two men, Pythagoras and Sporus, in legal ceremonies, with Sporus accorded the regalia worn by the wives of the Caesars. Juvenal and Martial note (with disapproval) that male couples are having traditional marriage ceremonies.

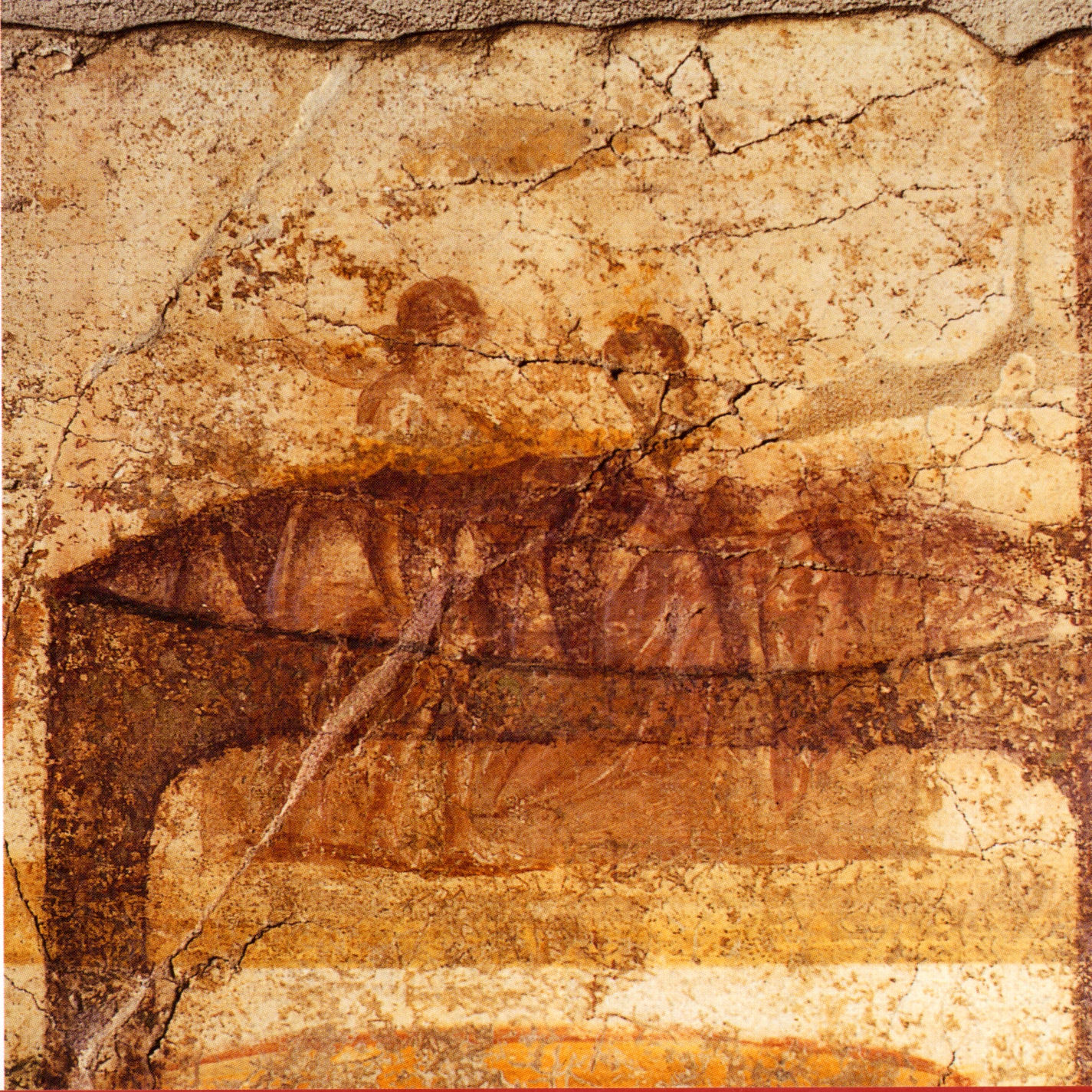
Wall painting of female couple from the Suburban Baths at Pompeii

- 79 – The eruption of Mount Vesuvius buries the coastal resorts of Pompeii and Herculaneum, preserving a rich collection of Roman erotic art, including representations of male-male and female-female.
- 98 – Trajan, one of the most beloved of Roman emperors, begins his reign. Trajan was well known for his homosexuality and fondness for young males. This was used to advantage by the king of Edessa, Abgar VII, who, after incurring the anger of Trajan for some misdeed, sent his handsome young son to make his apologies, thereby obtaining pardon.

Publius Cornelius Tacitus writes Germania. In Germania, Tacitus writes that the punishment for those who engage in "bodily infamy" among the Germanic peoples is to "smother in mud and bogs under an heap of hurdles." Tacitus also writes in Germania that the Germanic warrior-chieftains and their retinues were "in times of peace, beauty, and in times of war, a defense". Tacitus later wrote in Germania that priests of the Swabian sub-tribe, the Naharvali or Nahanarvali, who "dress as women" to perform their priestly duties.

==== 2nd century ====
- c. 200 – The Outlines of Pyrrhonism is published. In the book, Sextus Empiricus states that "amongst the Persians it is the habit to indulge in intercourse with males, but amongst the Romans it is forbidden by law to do so". He also stated in the book that "amongst us sodomy is regarded as shameful or rather illegal, but by the Germanic they say, it is not looked on as shameful but as a customary thing. It is said, too, that in Thebes long ago this practice was not held to be shameful, and they say that Meriones the Cretan was so called by way of indicating the Cretans' customed and some refer to this the burning love of Achilles for Patroclus. And what wonder, when both the adherents of the Cynic philosophy and the followers of Zeno of Citium, Cleanthes and Chrysippus, declare that this practice is indifferent?".

==== 2nd century – 3rd century ====
- 193 – 211 – Roman emperor Septimius Severus prescribed capital punishment for homosexual rape throughout the Roman Empire.

==== 3rd century ====
- 218 – 222 – Roman emperor Elagabalus's reign begins. At different times, Elagabalus marries five women and a man named Zoticus, an athlete from Smyrna, in a lavish public ceremony at Rome; but the Syrian's most stable relationship is with the chariot driver Hierocles, and Cassius Dio says Elagabalus delighted in being called Hierocles' mistress, wife, and queen. The emperor wears makeup and wigs, prefers to be called a lady and not a lord, and offers vast sums to any physician who can provide them with a vagina; for this reason, the emperor is seen by some writers as an early transgender figure and one of the first on record as seeking sex reassignment surgery.
- 222 – 235 – Roman emperor Severus Alexander deported homosexuals who were active in public life. According to Christius, Alexander increased the penalties for homosexuality throughout the Roman Empire. According to Augustan History, Alexander decreed that the taxes on pimps, prostitutes, and exoleti should not be deposited in the public purse; instead, he ordered that these taxes should be used for restoring the theatre of Marcellus, the Circus Maximus, the amphitheatre, and the stadium build by Domitian in the Campus Martius. According to Ælius Lampridus, Alexander even contemplated making male prostitution illegal.
- 244 – 249 – Roman emperor Marcus Julius Philippus either attempted to or did outlaw male prostitution throughout the Roman Empire.

==== 4th century ====
- 305 – 306 – Council of Elvira (now Granada, Spain). This council was representative of the Western European Church and among other things, it barred pederasts the right to Communion.
- 314 – Council of Ancyra (now Ankara, Turkey). This council was representative of the Eastern European Church and it excluded the Sacraments for 15 years to unmarried men under the age of 20 who were caught in homosexual acts, and excluded the man for life if he was married and over the age of 50.
- 306 – 337 – The Life of Constantine mentions a temple at Aphaca in Phoenicia, on a remote summit of Mount Libanus, being used by effeminate homosexual pagan priests, and says that this temple was destroyed by the command of Roman emperor Constantine I. It also states that Constantine passed a law ordering the extermination of effeminate homosexual pagan priests in Egypt.
- 337 – Constantius II and Constans I become the 62nd Emperor of the Roman Empire. During their reigns, they both engaged in same-sex relationships.
- 342 – The Roman emperors Constantius II and Constans I issue the following imperial decree for the Roman Empire:

"When a man marries in the manner of a woman, a woman about to renounce men, what does he wish, when sex has lost all its significance; when the crime is one which it is not profitable to know; when Venus is changed to another form; when love is sought and not found? We order the statutes to arise, the laws to be armed with an avenging sword, that those infamous persons who are now, or who hereafter may be, guilty may be subjected to exquisite punishment."

— Theodosian Code 9.7.3

- c. 380s – Ammianus Marcellinus publishes Res Gestae. In Res Gestae, Marcellinus writes that the Persians "are extravagantly given to venery, and are hardly contented with a multitude of concubines; they are far from immoral relations with boys." Also in Res Gestae, Marcellinus writes that "We have learned that these Taifali were a shameful folk, so sunken in a life of shame and obscenity, that in their country the boys are coupled with the men in a union of unmentionable lust, to consume the flower of their youth in the polluted intercourse of those paramours."
- 390 – The Roman emperors Valentinian II, Theodosius I and Arcadius issue the following imperial decrees for the Roman Empire:

"We cannot tolerate the city of Rome, mother of all virtues, being stained any longer by the contamination of male effeminacy, nor can we allow that agrarian strength, which comes down from the founders, to be softly broken by the people, thus heaping shame on the centuries of our founders and the princes, Orientius, dearly and beloved and favoured. Your laudable experience will therefore punish among revenging flames, in the presence of the people, as required by the grossness of the crime, all those who have given themselves up to the infamy of condemning their manly body, transformed into a feminine one, to bear practices reserved for the other sex, which have nothing different from women, carried forth – we are ashamed to say – from male brothels, so that all may know that the house of the manly soul must be sacrosanct to all, and that he who basely abandons his own sex cannot aspire to that of another without undergoing the supreme punishment."

— Collatio Mosaic and Roman Laws

"All persons who have the shameful custom of condemning a man's body, acting the part of a woman's to the sufferance of alien sex (for they appear not to be different from women), shall expiate a crime of this kind in avenging flames in the sight of the people."

— Theodosian Code 9.7.6

- 390 – 405 – Nonnus' Dionysiaca is the last known piece of Western literature for nearly 1,000 years to celebrate homosexual passion.

==== 6th century ====
- 506 – The Visigothic Code of Alaric II decreed burning at the stake for same-sex couples in the Visigothic Kingdom. Other punishments included public ostracism, shaving of the head, whipping, and castration.
- 533 – The Body of Civil Law goes into effect in the Byzantine Empire, enacting the following:

"In criminal cases public prosecutions take place under various statutes, including the Lex Julia de adulteris, "...which punishes with death, not only those who violate the marriages of others, but also those who dare to commit acts of vile lust with men."

— Institutes IV. xviii .4, Body of Civil Law

- 576 – Death of Anastasia the Patrician, who left life as a lady-in-waiting in the court of Justinian I in Constantinople to spend twenty-eight years (until death) dressed as a male monk in seclusion in Egypt, and has been adopted by today's LGBTQ community as an example of a transgender saint.
- 589 – The Visigothic kingdom in Spain, is converted from Arianism to Catholicism. This conversion leads to a revision of the law to conform to those of Catholic countries. These revisions include provisions for the persecution of homosexuals and Jewish people.

==== 7th century ====
- 654 – The Visigothic Kingdom criminalized sodomy and the punishment for it is castration. This is the first European secular law to criminalize sodomy.
- 693 – In Iberia, Visigothic ruler Egica of Hispania and Septimania, demanded that a Church council confront the occurrence of homosexuality in the Kingdom. The Sixteenth Council of Toledo issued a statement in response, which was adopted by Egica, stating that homosexual acts be punished by castration, exclusion from Communion, hair shearing, one hundred lashes, and banishment into exile.

==== 8th century ====
- c. 750 – With the creation of the Abbasid Caliphate, Muslim poets emerge describing homoeroticism and beautiful youths, such as Persian-Arab poet Abu Nuwas.

9th century

- 800 – 900 – During the Carolingian Renaissance, Alcuin of York, an abbot, wrote love poems to other monks in spite of numerous Church laws condemning homosexuality.
- 997 – King Mokjong of Goryeo, known for having male lovers, ascended to the throne in Korea.

=== 2nd millennium ===
==== 11th century ====
- 1007 – The Decretum of Burchard of Worms equates homosexual acts with sexual transgressions such as adultery and argues, therefore, that it should have the same penance (generally fasting).
- 1051 – Peter Damian writes the treatise Liber Gomorrhianus, in which he argues for stricter punishments for clerics failing their duty against "vices of nature."
- 1061 – Pedro Dias and Muño Vandilas are married by a priest at a chapel in the Kingdom of León.
- 1100 – Ivo of Chartres tries to convince Pope Urban II about homosexuality risks. Ivo accused Rodolfo, archbishop of Tours, of convincing the King of France to appoint a certain Giovanni as bishop of Orléans. Giovanni was well known as Rodolfo's lover and had relations with the king himself, a fact of which the king openly boasted. Pope Urban, however, didn't consider this as a decisive fact: Giovanni ruled as bishop for almost forty years, and Rodolfo continued to be well known and respected.

==== 12th century ====
- 1102 – The Council of London took measures to ensure that the English public knew that homosexuality was sinful.
- 1120 – Baldwin II of the Kingdom of Jerusalem, convenes the Council of Nablus to address the vices within the Kingdom. The Council calls for the burning of individuals who perpetually commit sodomy.
- 1140 – The Italian monk Gratian compiles his work Concordia discordantium canonum in which he argues that sodomy is the worst of all the sexual sins because it involves using the member in an unnatural way.
- 1164 – The English monk Aelred of Rievaulx writes his De spiritali amicitia, giving love between persons of the same gender a profound expression.
- 1179 – The Third Lateran Council of Rome issues a decree for the excommunication of sodomites.

==== 13th century ====
- 1232 – Pope Gregory IX starts the Inquisition in the Italian City-States. Some cities called for banishment and/or amputation as punishments for 1st- and 2nd-offending sodomites and burning for the 3rd or habitual offenders.
- 1260 – In the Kingdom of France, first-offending sodomites lost their testicles, second offenders lost their member, and third offenders were burned. Women caught in same-sex acts could be mutilated and executed as well.
- 1265 – Thomas Aquinas argues that sodomy is second only to bestiality in the ranking of sins of lust.
- 1283 – The Coutumes de Beauvaisis dictats that convicted sodomites should not only be burned but also that their property would be forfeited.

==== 14th century ====
- 1308–1314 – Philip IV of France orders the arrest of all Templars on charges of heresy, idolatry and sodomy, but these charges are only a pretext to seize the riches of the order. Order leaders are sentenced to death and burned at the stake on 18 March 1314 by Notre Dame.
- 1321 – Dante's Inferno places sodomites in the Seventh Circle.
- 1327 – The deposed King Edward II of England is killed, allegedly by forcing a red-hot poker through his rectum. Edward II had a history of conflict with the nobility, who repeatedly banished his former lover Piers Gaveston, 1st Earl of Cornwall.
- 1347 – Rolandino Roncaglia is tried for sodomy, an event that caused a sensation in Italy. He confessed he "had never had sexual intercourse, neither with his wife nor with any other woman, because he had never felt any carnal appetite, nor could he ever have an erection of his virile member". After his wife died of plague, Rolandino started to prostitute himself, wearing female dresses because "since he has female look, voice and movements – although he does not have a female orifice, but has a male member and testicles – many persons considered him to be a woman because of his appearance".
- 1351 – Buddhist temple murals depicting same-sex relationships were commissioned and painted in Thailand.
- 1357 – King Gongmin of Goryeo, known for having male lovers, ascended to the throne in Korea.
- 1370s – Jan van Aersdone and Willem Case were two men executed in Antwerp in the 1370s. The charge against them was same sex intercourse which was illegal and strenuously vilified in medieval Europe. Aersdone and Case stand out because records of their names have survived. One other couple still known by name from the 14th century were Giovanni Braganza and Nicoleto Marmagna of Venice.
- 1395 – John Rykener, known also as Johannes Richer and Eleanor, was a transvestite prostitute working mainly in London (near Cheapside), but also active in Oxford. He was arrested in 1395 for cross-dressing and interrogated.

==== 15th century ====
- 1424 – Bernardino of Siena preached for three days in Florence, Italy, against homosexuality and other forms of lust, culminating in a pyre in which burned cosmetics, wigs and all sorts of articles for the beautification. He calls for sodomites to be ostracized from society, and these sermons alongside measures by other clergy of the time strengthens opinion against homosexuals and encourages the authorities to increase the measures of persecution.
- 1431 – Nezahualcoyotl, Tlatoani of Texcoco, enacted laws making homosexuality a capital punishment by hanging in Texcoco.
- 1432 – In Florence the first organization specifically intended to prosecute sodomy is established, the "Night Officials", which over the next 70 years arrest about 10,000 men and boys, succeeding in getting about 2,000 convicted, with most then paying fines.
- 1436 – Royal Noble Consort Sun is banished from the Joseon court after it is discovered that she has been sleeping with her maid. The official decree blames her demotion on receiving visitors without her husband's permission and instructing her maids to sing men's songs.
- 1451 – Pope Nicholas V enables the papal Inquisition to persecute men who practice sodomy.
- 1471–1493 – According to Garcilaso de la Vega's Real Reviews of the Incas, during the reign of Sapa Inca Topa Inca Yupanqui or Túpac Inca Yupanqui, he persecuted homosexuals. Yupanqui's general, Auqui Tatu, burned alive in public square all those for whom there was even circumstantial evidence of sodomy in [H]acari valley, threatening to burn down whole towns if anyone engaged in sodomy. In Chincha, Yupanqui burned alive large numbers, pulling down their houses and any trees they had planted.
- 1475 – In Peru, a chronicle written under the Capac Yupanqui government describes the persecution of homosexuals with public burnings and destruction of homes (a practice usually reserved for conquered tribes).
- 1476 – Florentine court records of 1476 show that Leonardo da Vinci and three other young men were charged with sodomy twice, and acquitted.
- 1483 – The Spanish Inquisition begins. Sodomites were stoned, castrated, and burned. Between 1540 and 1700, more than 1,600 people were prosecuted for sodomy.
- 1492 – Desiderius Erasmus writes a series of love letters to a fellow monk while at a monastery in Steyn in the Netherlands.
- 1494 – Girolamo Savonarola criticizes the population of Florence for its "horrible sins" (mainly homosexuality and gambling) and exhorts them to give up their young and beardless lovers.
- 1497 – In Spain, the King of Aragon Ferdinand and Queen of Castile and León Isabella strengthen the sodomy laws hitherto applied only in the cities. An increase is made in the severity of the crime equating to treason or heresy, and the amount of evidence required for conviction is lowered, with torture permitted to extract confession. The property of the defendant is also confiscated.

==== 15th century – 16th century ====
- 1493–1525 – According to Garcilaso de la Vega's Real Reviews of the Incas, during his reign, Sapa Inca Huayna Capac merely "bade" the people of Tumbez to give up sodomy and did not take any measures against the Matna, who "practiced sodomy more openly and shamelessly than all the other tribes."

==== 16th century ====
- 1502 – A charge is brought against the Italian artist Sandro Botticelli on the grounds of sodomy.
- 1505–1521 – The Zhengde Emperor of the Ming dynasty had a same-sex relationship with the Muslim leader Sayyid Husain, although no evidence supporting this claim exists in Chinese sources
- 1512 – Revolt of the Compagnacci in Florence
- 1513 – Vasco Núñez de Balboa, a conquistador in modern-day Panama is described as throwing forty homosexual Indians to his dogs.
- 1519 – Ferdinand Magellan sentences the death penalty against his own crew when they arrived it Rio de Janeiro, after he deemed them as having a homosexual relationship
- 1523 – First of several charges of sodomy brought against the Florentine artist Benvenuto Cellini.
- 1526 – The founder and first emperor of the Mughal Empire, Emperor Babur, had a long-term loving relationship with his male lover Baburi Andijani, who was already an adult when Emperor Babur founded his dynasty.
- 1532 – The Holy Roman Empire makes sodomy punishable by death. The Florentine artist Michelangelo begins writing over 300 love poems dedicated to Tommaso dei Cavalieri.
- 1533 – King Henry VIII passes the Buggery Act 1533 making anal intercourse punishable by death throughout England.
- 1542 – Alvar Nuñez Cabeza de Vaca documents same sex marriages and men "who dress like women and perform the office of women, but use the bow and carry big loads" among a Native American tribe in his publication, The Journey of Alvar Nuñez Cabeza de Vaca and His Companions from Florida to the Pacific 1528–1536.
- 1543 – Henry VIII gives royal assent to the Laws in Wales Act 1542, extending the buggery law into Wales.
- 1553 – Mary I ascends the English throne and removes all of the laws that had been passed by Henry VIII during the English Reformation of the 1530s.
- 1558–1563 – Elizabeth I reinstates Henry VIII's old laws, including the Buggery Act 1533.
- 1561 – process of Wojciech z Poznania, who married Sebastian Słodownik, and lived with him for 2 years in Poznań. Both had female partners. On his return to Kraków, he married Wawrzyniec Włoszek. Wojciech, considered in public opinion as a woman, was burned for 'crimes against nature'.
- 1590 – The Boxer Codex records same-sex marriage as normalized in pre-colonial Philippines

==== 17th century ====
- 17th century – Hu Tianbao of Fujian was executed by the Chinese government. The people of Fujian later deified him as the god of homosexual love, building a temple in his honor and calling him Tu'er Shen.
- 1608 – Sweden's first secular law against male sodomy was introduced by Charles IX. The punishment was death.
- 1610 – The Colony of Virginia enacts a military order that criminalizes male sodomy, making it punishable by death. This order ends later the same year, when martial law is terminated upon the change in control of the Virginia Colony.
- 1620 – Brandenburg-Prussia criminalizes sodomy, making it punishable by death.
- 1624 – Richard Cornish of the Virginia Colony is tried and hanged for sodomy.
- 1648 – The first known prosecution for lesbian activity in North America occurs in March when Sarah White Norman is charged with "Lewd behaviour with each other upon a bed" with Mary Vincent Hammon in Plymouth, Massachusetts. Hammon was under 16 and not prosecuted.
- 1648 – In Canada's first-ever criminal trial for the crime of homosexuality, a gay military drummer stationed at the French garrison in Ville-Marie, New France is sentenced to death by the local Sulpician priests. After an intervention by the Jesuits in Quebec City, the drummer's life is spared on the condition that he accept the position of New France's first permanent executioner.
- 1655 – The Connecticut Colony passes a law against sodomy, which includes a punishment for lesbian intercourse as well.
- 1661 – The Colony of Virginia enacts English common law, thus criminalizing male-to-male sodomy again.
- 1672 – The Life and Struggles of Our Mother Wälättä P̣eṭros (1672) is the first reference of homosexuality between nuns in Ethiopian literature.
- 1683 – The Kingdom of Denmark criminalizes "relations against nature", making it punishable by death.
- 1688 – 1704 – Kagemachaya(ja), a Japanese gay bar, first opens in Japan.

==== 18th century ====
- 1721 – Catharina Margaretha Linck is executed for female sodomy in Germany.
- 1726 – Mother Clap's molly house in London is raided by police, resulting in the execution of three men.
- 1730 – In The Netherlands the Utrecht Sodomy Trials begin, resulting in the execution of over a hundred men and the banishment of hundreds more.
- 1781 – Jens Andersson of Norway, assigned female at birth but identifying as male, was imprisoned and put on trial after marrying Anne Kristine Mortensdotter in a Lutheran church. When asked about his gender, the response was "Hand troer at kunde henhøre til begge Deele" ("He believes he belongs to both").
- 1785 – Prince Kraison of Thailand became the first openly queer member of the Chakri dynasty since the dynasty's royal enthronment under its first ruler Rama I, who was Prince Kraison's father. He had a loving relationship with theatre actors Khun Thong and Yaem.
- 1785 – Jeremy Bentham is one of the first people to argue for the decriminalization of sodomy in England.
- 1786 – King Frederick the Great of Prussia dies. (See: Sexuality of Frederick the Great)
- 1791 – The Kingdom of France (Andorra and Haiti) adopts the French Penal Code of 1791, which no longer criminalizes sodomy. France thus becomes the first West European country to decriminalize homosexual acts between consenting adults.
- 1791 – The novel Dream of the Red Chamber by Cao Xueqin is published in China. It includes an openly bisexual character as well as an account of a gay bashing.
- 1793 – Monaco decriminalizes sodomy.
- 1794 – The Kingdom of Prussia abolishes the death penalty for sodomy.
- 1794 – Luxembourg decriminalizes sodomy.
- 1795 – Belgium decriminalizes sodomy.

== See also ==
- Gay and Lesbian Kingdom of the Coral Sea Islands
- Bisexuality in the United States
- Gay men in American history
- History of bisexuality
- History of human sexuality
- History of LGBTQ people in policing
- History of lesbianism
- History of lesbianism in the United States
- History of transgender people in the United States
- Intersex in history
- LGBTQ history
- LGBTQ history in Turkey
- List of LGBTQ actions in the United States prior to the Stonewall riots
- List of LGBTQ firsts by year
- Table of years in LGBTQ rights
- Timeline of African and diasporic LGBTQ history
- Timeline of asexual history
- Timeline of Asian and Pacific Islander diasporic LGBTQ history
- Timeline of intersex history
- Timeline of LGBTQ history in the British Isles
- Timeline of LGBTQ history in Canada
- Timeline of LGBTQ history in Ecuador
- Timeline of LGBTQ history in New York City
- Timeline of LGBTQ history in South Africa
- Timeline of LGBTQ history in the United States
- Timeline of LGBTQ Jewish history
- Timeline of LGBTQ Mormon history
- Timeline of same-sex marriage
- Timeline of same-sex marriage in the United States
- Timeline of sexual orientation and medicine
- Timeline of transgender history

== Sources ==
- Dynes, Wayne R (2016b). Encyclopedia of Homosexuality: volume 1. Routledge. ISBN 9781317368151.
- Pritchard, James B., ed. (1969). "The Middle Assyrian Laws". Ancient Near Eastern Texts relating to the Old Testament. Translated by Theophile J. Meek (3rd ed.). Princeton University Press. pp. 180–188. ISBN 0-691-03503-2.
- Richlin, Amy (April 1993). "Not Before Homosexuality: The Materiality of the Cinaedus and the Roman Law against love between men". Journal of the History of Sexuality. 3 (4). University of Texas Press: 523–573.
- Sabo, Adriana; Vuletić, Aleksandra; Stolić, Ana; Burmaz, Branko; Zec, Dejan; Duišin, Dragana; Stojanović, Dragana; Đurić, Dubravka; Maljković, Dušan; Erdei, Ildiko; Barišić, Jasmina; Petrović, Jelena; Višnjić, Jelena; Blagojević, Jelisaveta; Lončarević, Katarina; Radulović, Lidija; Kapetanović, Milorad; Jovanović, Nebojša; Savić, Nebojša; Knežević, Nenad; Dimitrijević, Olga; Dimitrov, Slavčo; Gočanin, Sonja; Bojanin, Stanoje; Kalinić, Tanja; Bjeličić, Vladimir; Jovanović, Vladimir; Ivanović, Zorica (2014). Blagojević, Jelisaveta; Dimitrijević, Olga; Stolić, Ana; Đurić, Dubravka; Lončarević, Katarina; Ivanović, Zorica; Radmanović, Mane; Popović, Tatjana; Savanović, Aleksandra; Knežević, Nenad (eds.). MEĐU NAMA: Neispričane priče gej i lezbejskih života - zbornik tekstova [BETWEEN US: Untold stories of gay and lesbian lives] (in Croatian). Belgrade: Hartefakt Fond. ISBN 978-86-914281-4-3.
