= 1970s in LGBTQ rights =

This is a list of notable events in the history of LGBT rights that took place in the 1970s.

== Background ==
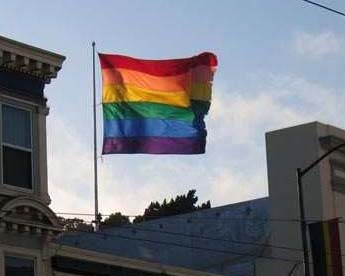
The Gay Pride Flag, symbol of the Rights Movement, was first flown in 1978 in San Francisco. This is the version flying over the Castro in June 2005

Private, consensual same-sex activity was decriminalized in England and Wales in 1967. Most same-sex activity was legalized in Canada in 1969. The Stonewall riots, which occurred in New York City in June 1969, are generally considered to have ignited the modern gay rights movement in the United States.

== Themes ==
Considering the profound stigma still attached to homosexuality at the dawn of the 1970s, the movement, although still nascent, saw tremendous gains over the course of the decade. The American Psychiatric Association removed homosexuality from its list of psychiatric disorders in 1973. Homosexual decriminalisation laws and ordinances were passed by several cities and states, including Ann Arbor, Michigan in 1972, South Australia in 1975, the Australian Capital Territory in 1976, and in 1977 Quebec became the first jurisdiction larger than a city or county in the world to prohibit discrimination based on sexual orientation in the public and private sectors.

Bisexuality also saw increased visibility. A Quaker group, the Committee of Friends on Bisexuality, issued the "Ithaca Statement on Bisexuality" supporting bisexuals.

The Statement, which may have been "the first public declaration of the bisexual movement" and "was certainly the first statement on bisexuality issued by an American religious assembly," appeared in the Quaker Friends Journal and The Advocate in 1972.

Today Quakers have varying opinions on LGBTQ people and rights, with some Quaker groups more accepting than others.

For the first time, a few openly gay people were elected to political office in the United States. In 1977 Harvey Milk, a politically active gay man in the emerging gay neighborhood The Castro, was elected to the Board of Supervisors in San Francisco. Milk and liberal San Francisco mayor George Moscone were assassinated the following year. In 1979 their assassin, Dan White, received a sentence of voluntary manslaughter. The anger the gay community felt about the murders and about White's light sentence further galvanized the movement (see White Night Riots).

The increasing visibility of gay people also generated a backlash during the 1970s. In perhaps the most discussed anti-gay rights campaign of the decade, singer Anita Bryant led a successful drive in 1977 to repeal a gay-rights ordinance in Dade County, Florida. The new openness about homosexuality proved disconcerting to some heterosexuals who had been accustomed to gay and lesbian people remaining closeted and politically silent. Canadian author Robertson Davies wrote during the decade that "the love that dare not speak its name" (referencing the famous Lord Alfred Douglas quotation, also quoted by Oscar Wilde during his court case in 1895) "has become the love that won't shut up." On October 14, 1979, approximately 100,000 people marched in Washington, D.C., in the largest pro-gay rights demonstration up to that time.

== By year ==
- 1970 – The first Gay Liberation Day March is held in New York City; The first LGBT Pride Parade is held in Los Angeles; The first "Gay-in" held in San Francisco; Carl Wittman writes A Gay Manifesto; CAMP (Campaign Against Moral Persecution) is formed in Australia.
- 1971 – Society Five (a homosexual rights organization) is formed in Melbourne, Australia; Homosexuality is decriminalized in Austria, Costa Rica and Finland; Colorado and Oregon repeal sodomy laws; Idaho repeals the sodomy law — Then re-instates the repealed sodomy law because of outrage among Mormons and Catholics. The Netherlands changes the homosexual age of consent to 16, the same as the straight age of consent; The U.S. Libertarian Party calls for the repeal of all victimless crime laws, including the sodomy laws; Dr. Frank Kameny becomes the first openly gay candidate for the United States Congress; The University of Michigan establishes the first collegiate LGBT programs office, then known as the "Gay Advocate's Office." The UK Gay Liberation Front (GLF) was recognized as a political movement in the national press and was holding weekly meetings of 200 to 300 people.
- 1972 – Sweden becomes first country in the world to allow transgender people (called transsexuals at the time) to legally change their sex, and provides free hormone therapy; Hawaii legalizes homosexuality; In Australia, the Dunstan Labor government introduces a consenting adults in private type defence in South Australia. This defence was initiated as a bill by Murray Hill, father of former Defence Minister Robert Hill, and later repealed the state's sodomy law in 1975; Norway decriminalizes homosexuality; East Lansing, Michigan and Ann Arbor, Michigan and San Francisco, California become the first cities in United States to pass a homosexual rights ordinance. Jim Foster, San Francisco and Madeline Davis, Buffalo, New York, first gay and lesbian delegates to the Democratic Convention, Miami, McGovern; give the first speeches advocating a gay rights plank in the Democratic Party Platform. "Stonewall Nation" first gay anthem is written and recorded by Madeline Davis and is produced on 45 rpm record by the Mattachine Society of the Niagara Frontier. Lesbianism 101, first lesbianism course in the U.S. taught at the University of Buffalo by Margaret Small and Madeline Davis. A Quaker group, the Committee of Friends on Bisexuality, issued the "Ithaca Statement on Bisexuality" supporting bisexuals.
- 1973 – On the 15 October the Australian and New Zealand College of Psychiatry Federal Council declares homosexuality not an illness – the first such body in the world to do so; in December the American Psychiatric Association removes homosexuality from its Diagnostic and Statistical Manual of Mental Disorders (DSM-II), based largely on the research and advocacy of Evelyn Hooker. Malta legalizes homosexuality; In West Germany, the age of consent is reduced for homosexuals to 18 (though it is 14 for heterosexuals).
- 1974 – Kathy Kozachenko becomes the first openly gay American elected to public office when she wins a seat on the Ann Arbor, Michigan city council; In New York City Dr. Fritz Klein founds the Bisexual Forum, the first support group for the Bisexual Community; Ohio repeals sodomy laws. Robert Grant founds American Christian Cause to oppose the "gay agenda", the beginning of modern Christian politics in the United States. In London, the first openly LGBT telephone help line opens, followed one year later by the Brighton Gay and Lesbian Switchboard; the Brunswick Four are arrested on January 5, 1974, in Toronto, Ontario. This incident of Lesbophobia galvanizes the Toronto Lesbian and Gay community; the National Socialist League (The Gay Nazi Party) is founded in Los Angeles, California.
- 1975 – Homosexuality is legalized in South Australia; homosexuality is legalized in California due to bill authored by and successfully lobbied for in the state legislature by State Assemblyman from San Francisco Willie Brown; Elaine Noble becomes the second openly gay American elected to public office when she wins a seat in the Massachusetts State House; the first National Homosexual Conference is held in Melbourne, Australia; Panama is the second country in the world to allow transsexuals who have gone through gender reassignment surgery to get their personal documents reflecting their new sex.

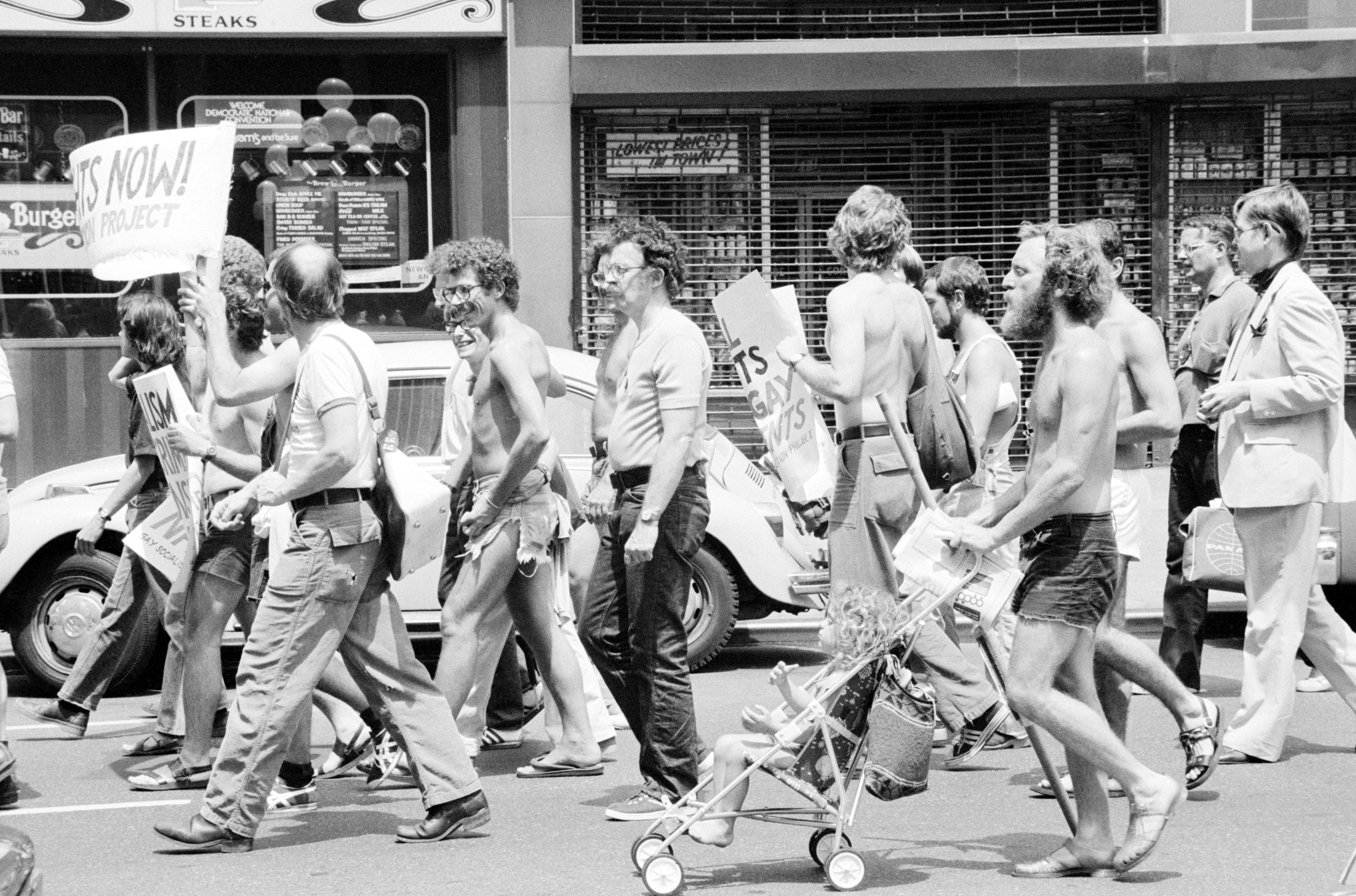
Gay rights protesters in New York City, protesting at the United States' 1976 Democratic National Convention

Original eight-color version of the LGBT pride flag

- 1976 – Robert Grant founds the Christian Voice to take his anti-homosexual-rights crusade national in the United States; the Homosexual Law Reform Coalition and the Gay Teachers Group are started in Australia; the Australian Capital Territory decriminalizes homosexuality between consenting adults in private and equalizes the age of consent; and Denmark equalizes the age of consent.
- 1977 – Harvey Milk is elected city-county supervisor in San Francisco, becoming the first American being elected to public office while already openly gay. Dade County, Florida enacts a Human Rights Ordinance; it is repealed the same year after a militant anti-homosexual-rights campaign led by Anita Bryant. Quebec becomes the first jurisdiction larger than a city or county in the world to prohibit discrimination based on sexual orientation in the public and private sectors; Croatia, Montenegro, and Slovenia legalise homosexuality. Publication of the first issue of Gaysweek, NYC's first mainstream gay weekly.
- 1978 – San Francisco Supervisor Harvey Milk and Mayor George Moscone are assassinated by former Supervisor Dan White; a protest commemorating the Stonewall Riots leads to many arrests, with commemorative protests the following year known as the Sydney Gay Mardi Gras, later Sydney Gay and Lesbian Mardi Gras; The rainbow flag is first used as a symbol of homosexual pride; Sweden establishes a uniform age of consent. Samois the earliest known lesbian-feminist BDSM organization is founded in San Francisco; well-known members of the group include Patrick Califia and Gayle Rubin; the group is among the very earliest advocates of what came to be known as sex-positive feminism; The International Lesbian and Gay Association (ILGA) is established. Theatrical release and television broadcast of the feature documentary Word Is Out: Stories of Some of Our Lives, and publication of the book transcribed from it.
- 1979 – The first national homosexual rights march on Washington, D.C. is held; The White Night riots occur; Harry Hay issues the first call for a Radical Faerie gathering in Arizona, and Spain decriminalize homosexuality. A number of people in Sweden called in sick with a case of being homosexual, in protest of homosexuality being classified as an illness. This was followed by an activist occupation of the main office of the National Board of Health and Welfare. Within a few months, Sweden became the first country in the world to remove homosexuality as an illness. The Village Station police raid occurs, nicknamed "Dallas's Stonewall".

== See also ==
- Table of years in LGBT rights
