= California Consenting Adult Sex Act =

California law decriminalizing gay sex

California State Legislature
- Full name: An act to amend Section 12912 of the Education Code, to amend Sections 972 and 985 of the Evidence Code, and to amend Sections 220, 286, 287, 288a and 290 of, to add Section 286.5 to, and to repeal Sections 269a, 269b, 286.1 and 288b of, the Penal Code, relating to sexual offenses.
- Introduced: January 15, 1975
- Assembly voted: 45-26
- Senate voted: 21-20
- Signed into law: Yes
- Governor: Jerry Brown
- Code: Education, Evidence, and Penal
- Section: Section 12912 of the Education Code; Sections 972 and 985 of the Evidence Code; and Sections 220, 286, 287, 288a, and 290, and to repeal Sections 269a, 269b, 286.1, and 288b of the Penal Code.

Status: Amended

The Consenting Adult Sex Law (Assembly Bill 489) is a Californian piece of legislation which decriminalized private and consensual gay sex. Its main promoters were George Moscone, an early proponent of gay rights, and his friend and ally Willie Brown, who was serving in the California Assembly at the time. The bill passed in the Senate by a vote of 21 to 20 and in the Assembly by a vote of 45 to 26. It was signed into law by Governor Jerry Brown on May 12, 1975, which came into effect in January 1976.

A previous bill to the same effect had been introduced in 1970 but had failed to garner enough support to pass.

== History ==
During the late 19th and early 20th centuries, sodomy was often considered a “crime against nature” due to the fact that engaging in this act disallows any possibility for procreation. Sodomy is defined as being "sexual contact that takes place between the penis of one person and the anus of another person." These laws were extended by state legislation to include oral sex performed on a man or a woman. Observations were then made on the people who committed the crime and the majority of offenders did such acts with minors. Despite improvements on laws protecting minors in cases of molestation, sodomy was still the primary charge.

== Assembly Bill 489 ==
The bill decriminalized sex that is non-procreational and protected minors who could not legally consent. Its text says "This bill removes criminal sanctions from adulterous cohabitation; and it removes specific criminal sanctions from sodomy and oral copulation except: (1) when the sodomy or oral copulation is committed with a minor or by force, violence, duress, menace or threat of great bodily harm."

== Modern-Day California: Penal Code 286 ==
The California Penal Code 286 still punishes for sodomy under the following circumstances:

1. Act is done with someone under the age of 18 (a minor)
2. Done through violent force, fear tactics, or manipulation
3. Done on someone who is:

- Intoxicated / under the influence of drugs and therefore unable to consent for a sexual act
- Diagnosed with a physical or mental disability, in which the perpetrator is aware of, that would cause him or her to be unable to consent
- Uninformed of the type of sexual act that was to be engaged in or was asleep

These guidelines are in place in order for anyone to be justifiably accused of unlawful sodomy and/or rape. They do not discriminate against people according to their sexual preferences or sexual orientation. The consequences for an illegal act of sodomy are defined in Assembly Bill 489: "This bill increases the punishment to not less than three years state imprisonment in cases of sodomy by force, violence, duress, menace or threat of great bodily harm, and in cases where the other person is 14 years of age and 10 years younger than the defendant. If the sodomy is with a person under 18, sodomy is punishable under the bill as a felony-misdemeanor by imprisonment in state prison for not more than 15 years or in the county jail for not more than one year."

== See also ==
- 1975 in LGBT rights
- 1976 in LGBT rights

== Bibliography ==
- Skelton, George; Gillam, Jerry (May 9, 1975). "Assembly Kills Softer 'Pot' Law, Passes Sex Bill". Los Angeles Times. pp. B1-2.
- (May 14, 1975). "Gov. Brown Signs Bill Legalizing All Sex Acts." Los Angeles Times.
- Woods, William and Diane Binson (2003). Bay Bathhouses and Public Health Policy. Binghamton: Haworth Press.
