= Salem Capital Pride =

Event and organization based in Oregon, U.S.

- Status: Active
- Genre: Pride festival
- Frequency: Annually
- Venue: Riverfront City Park (typically)
- Location: Salem, Oregon
- Country: United States
- Years active: 2004–present
- Established: 2004
- Organizer: Salem Capital Pride (Non-profit)
- Website: www.salemcapitalpride.org

Salem Capital Pride is an annual event and non-profit organization based in Salem, Oregon, United States. Founded in 2004, its mission is to "promote understanding and education regarding LGBTQ issues, and to foster a sense of community for these individuals and their supporters in Salem and the Mid-Willamette Valley of Oregon." The organization is an important hub for LGBTQ culture in Salem.

== See also ==
- Eugene Pride
- Pride Northwest
