= LGBTQ culture in Eugene, Oregon =

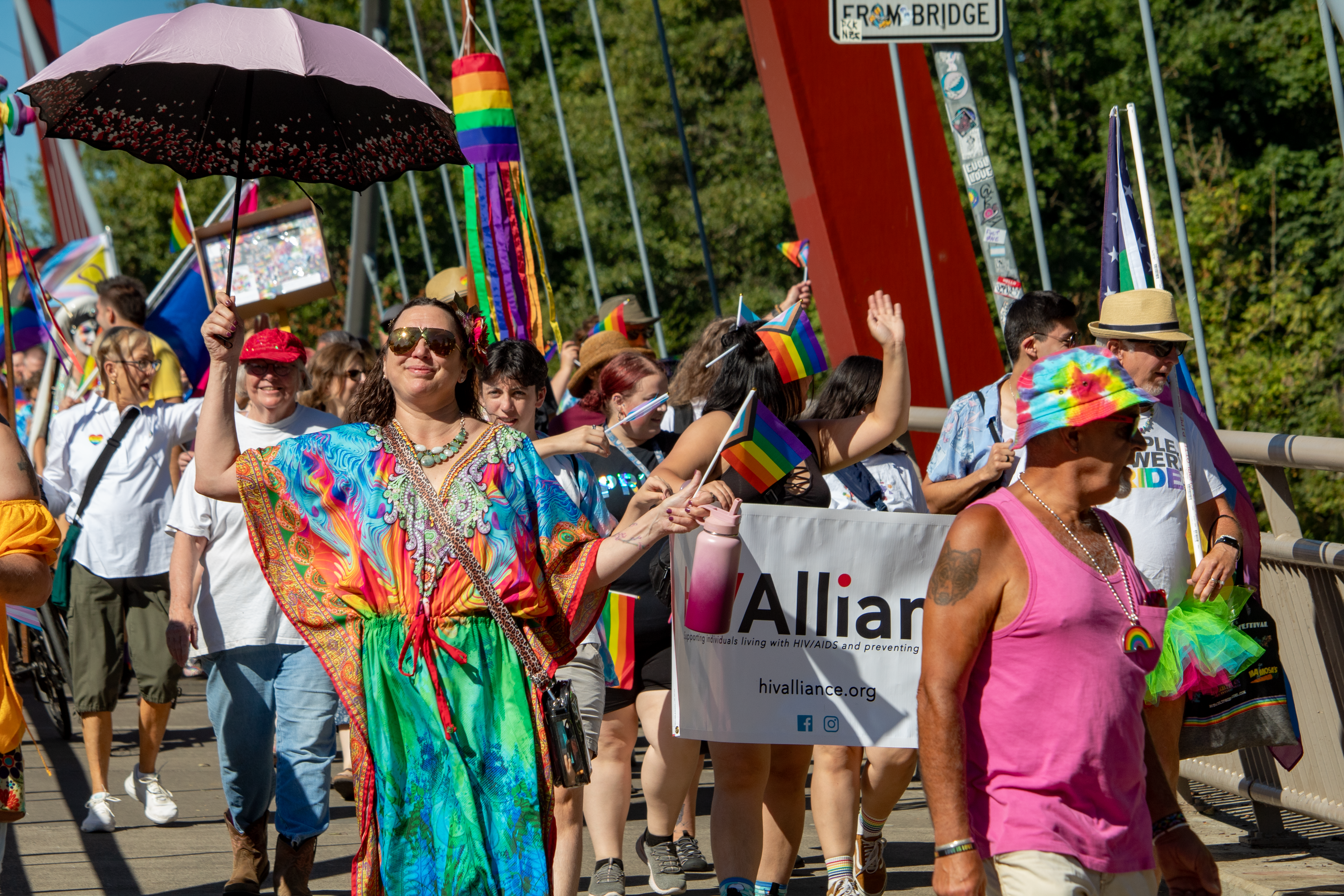
Eugene-Springfield Pride, 2023

LGBTQ culture in Eugene, Oregon predates the Stonewall riots in New York in 1969, but that event coincided with organized efforts in Lane County, Oregon, to support and celebrate LGBTQ people. The Human Rights Campaign's Municipal Equality Index, which evaluates the LGBTQ-friendliness of cities nationwide, gave Eugene a score of 100 out of 100 in 2025. In 2013, the Advocate ranked Eugene 7th on its list of "Gayest Cities in America".

The City of Eugene has a City Manager’s Office of Equity and Community, which supports the local LGBTQ community, as well as a Human Rights Commission which "is tasked with advising City Council and staff on human rights policy, including protections to LGBTQ+ community members." The Eugene Police Department also has an LGBTQ liaison.

Although it has been rated on lists of cities friendly to LGBTQ populations, there are few venues specifically for the LGBTQ community in the Eugene-Springfield metropolitan area.

== LGBTQ pride festival ==
Since 1993, committee volunteers have organized the Eugene Pride each year in August, rather than in June, "which is Pride Month, but you know that unique Eugene thing: We're different," according to the town's alternative newspaper. "Plus, we're too busy at the pride celebrations of the city to the north in June. So: We're later, we're smaller, but we're still proud." The festival is supported by sponsorships and volunteers.

== History ==
The Gay Peoples Alliance formed at the University of Oregon (UO) in 1969. Eugene Gay People's Alliance formed in 1970. In 1974, UO organized a Pride Week, and the Imperial Sovereign Court of the Emerald Empire was established the same year.

The Riviera Room, established in the 1970s, was the first known gay bar in Eugene. Perry's opened in 1981 and would later become Club Arena, and it and Mother Kali's were LGBTQ "hotspots" throughout the 1980s and 1990s. Neighbors was a queer bar established in the 1990s in a former McDonald's; it closed in 2006. Club Snafu was a "tiny LGBT club" that opened in 2006 and closed in 2010. Cowfish was not a gay bar, but was central to LGBTQ nightlife in Eugene in the mid-2010s due to their inclusive policies (such as trans-friendly restrooms) and the lack of explicitly queer alternatives.

Eugene City Council added protections for sexual orientation to the city's human rights provision in 1977, but it was repealed the following year with Eugene Local Measure 51. In 1992, Springfield anti-gay Ballot Measure 20-08 passed, but Statewide anti-gay Measure 9 failed.

In 1993, the Eugene/Springfield Pride Festival was held in Amazon Park. Citizens United Against Discrimination was formed in Lane County in 1994. That same year, statewide anti-gay Measure 13 failed, and HIV Alliance was formed to support people living with AIDS and prevent new infections. From 1994 to 2000, the Eugene/Springfield Pride Festival was held in Maurie Jacobs Park.

In 1997, Eugene city employees gained health insurance benefits for domestic partners. In 1999, Scott Meisner, who was the city's first gay city councilor, became president of Eugene city council. From 2001 though 2013, Eugene/Springfield Pride Festival location was held in Alton Baker Park.

In 2010, Gay in the Park was held at Washington Jefferson Park in Eugene.

The Wayward Lamb opened as a dedicated LGBTQ space in August 2015. Calling itself "Eugene's Official Queer Pub", the venue also offered a private event space and "unique dedicated queer programming". Citing the expectation that it was "a de facto LGBTQ (lesbian, gay, bisexual, transgender, queer) community center as well as a bar", the owner closed the bar in February 2018. The space re-opened as Spectrum in the summer of 2018 as a re-branded queer bar under new management, offering a quiet reading room and Southern-inspired dining in addition to the usual drag shows, lip-synch battles, and debauchery. The venue closed temporarily in 2020 and remained closed for the first two years of the COVID-19 pandemic before reopening in April 2022. Spectrum closed permanently in 2024, after which Eugene's queer nightlife continued through pop-up events at other venues.

The Haus of Blunt drag family was established in Eugene in 2022.

The Lavender Network opened Eugene's first permanent LGBTQ community center in 2026.

== Recreation and social activities ==
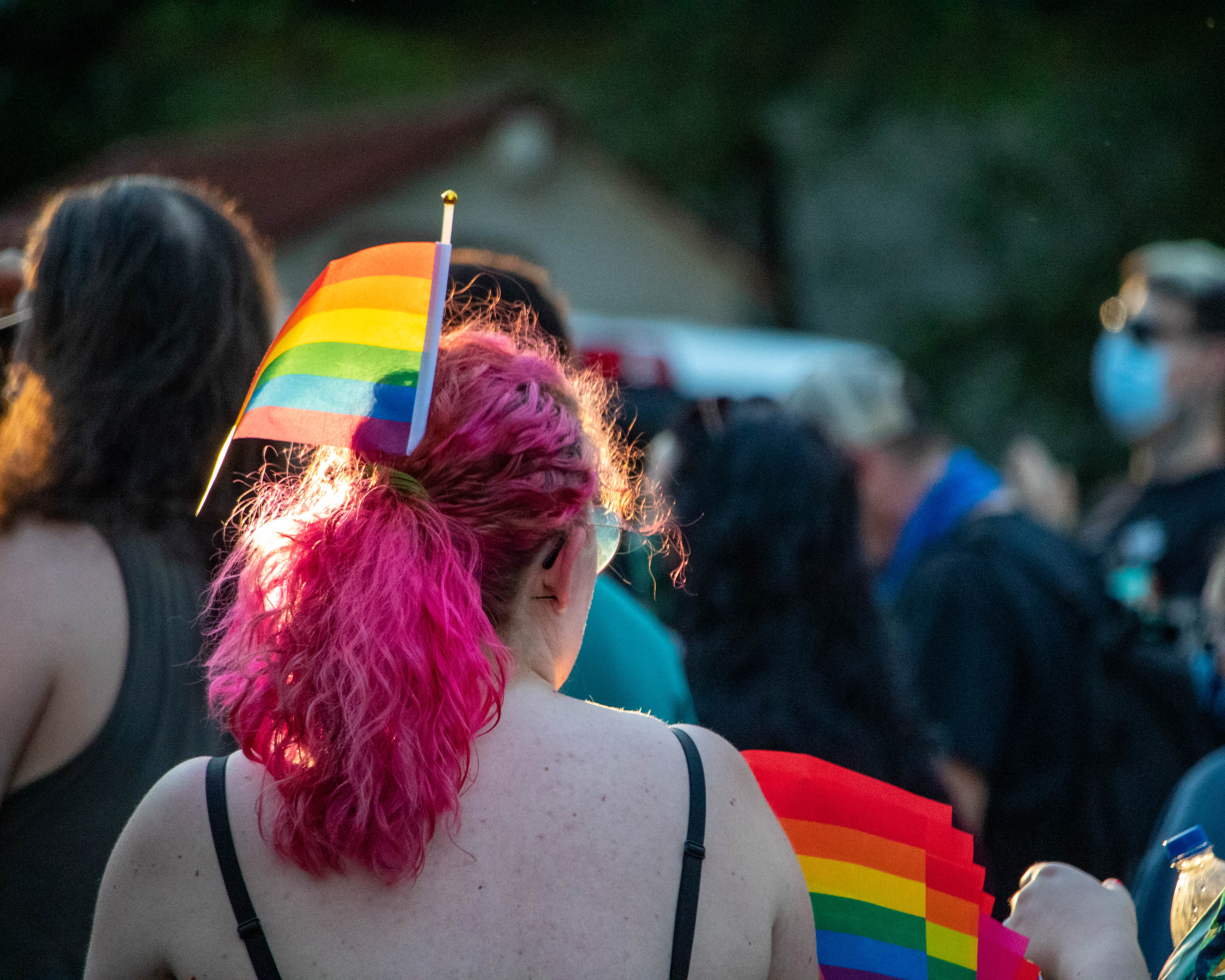
Person wearing a gay pride flag on Chambers Overpass, 7th Avenue, and the Whit in Eugene, Oregon

A variety of LGBTQ social, political, and support groups meet in Eugene.

The Lavender Network is "an LGBTQ+ collaborative resource hub and community space" located near downtown Eugene. HIV Alliance offers healthcare services such as HIV, Hepatitis C, and STI testing as well as syringe exchange.

The Eugene Gay Men's Chorus is a choral group that was formed in 2018 and collaborates with the Portland Gay Men's Chorus.

The nearest PFLAG chapters are in Salem and Florence.

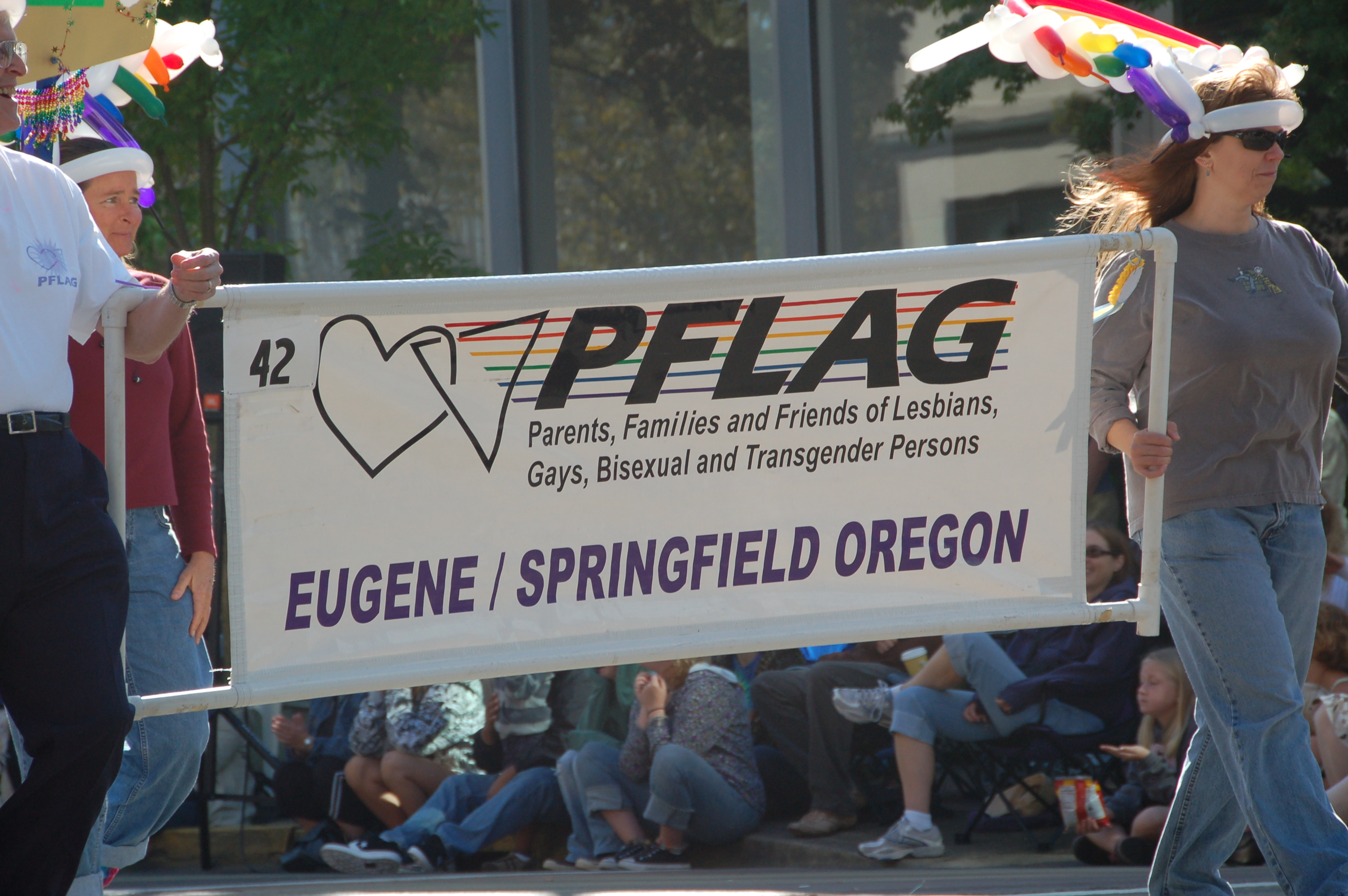
PFLAG banner at Eugene Pride, 2007

Eugene Interweave is a church-supported group "dedicated to the spiritual, political, and social well being of gay Unitarian Universalists, allies, friends, and community". The group sponsors a potluck and film on the second Friday each month.

Imperial Sovereign Court of the Emerald Empire is a non-profit social and community service organization hosting performances and activities to raise funds for local community charities and services.

The Broadway Revue Burlesque Show performs every Sunday evening at Luckeys Club Cigar Store, one of the oldest businesses in downtown Eugene.

The Haus of Blunt drag family is based in Eugene.

Rain BoWomen meet twice monthly for dinner at restaurants in the Eugene/Springfield area.

Soromundi Lesbian Chorus of Eugene ("sisters of the world") is a non-audition choir open to all women, celebrating themselves and community as "a visible expression of lesbian pride".

Local business that are owned by or friendly to LGBTQ people include Community Cup, Nelson's in the Whit, and Old Nick's Pub.

== See also ==
- Culture of Oregon
- LGBTQ culture in Portland, Oregon
- LGBTQ culture in Salem, Oregon
