= Gay Left =

British Marxist organisation for gay men

- Formation: 1975
- Dissolved: 1980
- Type: Marxist organisation for gay men based in the United Kingdom
- Purpose: Marxist analysis, gay activism
- Headquarters: London, England
- Region served: UK
- Members: 15

Gay Left was a collective of gay men and a journal of the same name which they published every six months in London between the years 1975 and 1980. It was formed after the dissolution of the Gay Liberation Front (GLF) and the Gay Marxist Group. Gay Left formed out of a reading group made up of members of the defunct Gay Marxist group.

Its goal was to contribute towards a Marxist analysis of homosexual oppression and to encourage in the gay movement an understanding of the links between the struggle against sexual oppression and the struggle for socialism.

The journal Gay Left initially described itself as "A Socialist Journal Produced by Gay Men", which evolved into "A Gay Socialist Journal" by the magazine's end, reflecting the internal debates that ran throughout Gay Left's life between the collective and lesbians who, though none ever joined the collective, frequently contributed articles.

== The Collective ==
In all a total of fifteen gay men became part of the collective at one point or another, with nine members at the start and nearly half of them forming part of the final eight. The group met on alternate Fridays and Sundays from 1974 until 1980. As well as editorial planning, the members also wrote a collective statement keynoting each issue. The collective espoused radical leftist politics, influenced by thinkers such as Antonio Gramsci, Sigmund Freud and Michel Foucault, and by the successes of the gay rights and feminist movements.

Issue/Name	Issue 1 Autumn 1975	Issue 2 Spring 1976	Issue 3 Autumn 1976	Issue 4 Summer 1977	Issue 5 Winter 1977/8	Issue 6 Summer 1978	Issue 7 Winter 1978/9	Issue 8 Summer 1979	Issue 9 Winter 1979/80	Issue 10 Summer 1980
Keith Birch	✓	✓	✓	✓	✓	✓	✓	✓	✓	✓
Gregg Blachford	✓	✓	✓	✓	✓					
Bob Cant	✓	✓	✓	✓						
Derek Cohen		✓	✓	✓	✓	✓	✓	✓	✓	✓
Emmanuel Cooper	✓	✓	✓	✓	✓	✓	✓	✓	✓	✓
Phil Derbyshire							✓	✓	✓	✓
Richard Dyer							✓			
Ross Irwin	✓									
Randall Kincaid	✓	✓	✓	✓						
Ron Peck		✓	✓							
Angus Suttie	✓	✓	✓							
Simon Watney						✓	✓	✓	✓	✓
Jeffrey Weeks	✓	✓	✓	✓	✓	✓	✓	✓	✓	✓
Tom Woodhouse									✓	✓
Nigel Young	✓	✓	✓	✓	✓	✓	✓	✓	✓	✓

== Journal ==
The journal published by the collective, Gay Left, combined theoretical articles with reviews and political reports. Alongside more historical articles like 'Where Engels Feared to Tread' (GL 1), which traced the evolution of Marxist attitudes towards sexuality and gender, were articles on struggles in the workplace like 'Gays and Trade Unions' (GL 1), 'The Gay Workers' Movement' (GL 2), 'All Worked UP' (GL 3), 'Gays at Work' (GL 6 and 7), and 'Work Place Politics: Gay Politics' (GL 10); and pieces on the attitudes of leftist organisations towards the gay issue, such as 'A Grim Tale', about the International Socialists' Gay Group (GL 3) or 'Communists' Comment' (GL 4).

Gay Left was also a leader in exploring gay culture in its broadest sense. Gays in film formed a continuous theme following a ground- breaking article by Richard Dyer in GL 2, with regular reviews (for example, of Rainer Werner Fassbinder (GL 2)), and coverage of Ron Peck's attempts to make his film, Nighthawks (Peck was then a member of the collective and other members were involved in the film making). Andrew Britton challenged 'Camp' (GL 6), and there were pioneering articles on 'Gay Art', the gay singer, Tom Robinson and the theatre group Gay Sweatshop (GL 7). Richard Dyer's article 'In Defence of Disco' (GL 8) was one of the first to take disco seriously as an expression of the new gay consciousness. Mandy Merck explored Gays on TV in GL 10 at the start of what proved to be a revolution in the ways in which lesbians and gays were represented.

== Contributors ==
Gay Left's contributors included many experienced activists, particularly in the field of feminism, education and workplace politics.

Issue/Name	Issue 1 Autumn 1975	Issue 2 Spring 1976	Issue 3 Autumn 1976	Issue 4 Summer 1977	Issue 5 Winter 1977/8	Issue 6 Summer 1978	Issue 7 Winter 1978/9	Issue 8 Summer 1979	Issue 9 Winter 1979/80	Issue 10 Summer 1980
Alison Hennegen									✓	
Andrew Britton			✓				✓			
Barry Davis									✓	
Bea Campbell				✓						
Caroline Airs										✓
Celia Holt				✓						
Chris Jones						✓				
David Fernbach							✓			✓
David Landau										✓
David Thompson								✓		
David Widgery	✓									
Dennis Altman						✓			✓	
Fred Bearman							✓			
Glenn McKee									✓	
Hans Klabbers							✓	✓		
Helen Bishop					✓					
Jacky Plaster								✓		
Jamie Gough								✓		
Jane Lewis						✓				
Jeff Dudgeon							✓			
John de Wit									✓	
John Lindsay		✓								
John Quinn						✓				
John Shiers						✓				
John Warburton								✓		
Kate Ingrey								✓		
Kay Young						✓				
Ken Plummer					✓					
Lindsay Taylor										✓
Lindsay Turner									✓	
Mandy Merck										✓
Margaret Coulson										
Margaret Jackson							✓	✓		
Marie Walsh								✓		
Patrick Hughes				✓						
Paul Hallam					✓					
Peter Bradley										✓
Ros Coward										✓
Sarah Benton				✓	✓					
Sarah Maguire								✓		
Shauna Brown							✓			
Stephen Gee							✓			
Sue Bruley		✓					✓			
Sue Cartledge					✓	✓	✓			
Teresa Savage				✓						
Tom O'Carroll							✓	✓		

== Other activities ==
Gay Left organised a conference in London in July 1977 titled "What is to Be Done?" (possibly after the famous pamphlet of the same name by Vladimir Lenin) and edited and wrote chapters for a book published by Allison and Busby in 1980 titled Homosexuality, Power and Politics. The book was re-published by Verso in October 2018.

== See also ==
- List of fictional gay characters
- LGBT social movements
- 1970s in LGBT rights
- LGBT rights by country or territory
- Socialism and LGBT rights
