= Robert Hodges =

American professor of English

Robert R. Hodges is a professor emeritus of English and Comparative Literature at California State University, Fullerton.

Hodges earned a master's degree from the University of Missouri in 1954, with a thesis on Narrative technique in the novels of Willa Cather. He became an authority on the life and oeuvre of Joseph Conrad, the subject of his 1960 doctoral dissertation at Stanford University, which he later published as a book. He observed for instance in "Deep Fellowship" (Journal of Homosexuality, 1979) the multifarious homoerotic elements in Conrad's work, and seeking thus to challenge the entrenched and enforced view of Conrad as a "heterosexual man's writer", an "established man's man of letters", "a literary heterosexual role model" and a "guardian of society's male mystique".

He was an activist in the gay rights movement of the 1970s and 1980s, and was editor-in-chief of the Newsletter of the Western Gay Academic Union.

"Hodges, who died in 2020 at the age 91, left an endowment of $400,000 to Cal State Fullerton's Department of English. The endowment was established in his name, Robert Hodges, professor emeritus of English, for the purpose to support fellowships for undergraduates and graduate students pursuing academic degrees in English or comparative literature."

== Additional sources ==
- Hodges, Robert R. "Deep Fellowship: Homosexuality and Male Bonding in the Life and Fiction of Joseph Conrad." Journal of Homosexuality, 1979: 379–393.
- —. The dual heritage of Joseph Conrad. The Hague: Mouton, 1967.
