= 1978 in LGBTQ rights =

This is a list of notable events in the history of LGBT rights that took place in the year 1978.

== Events ==
Original version of the gay pride flag, first flown in the 1978 Gay Freedom Day Parade in San Francisco

- The city of Berkeley, California, prohibits employment discrimination based on sexual orientation in the private sector.
- San Francisco adds Article 33 to the San Francisco Police Code, which prohibits discrimination in employment, housing and public accommodations based on sexual orientation in the private sector.

=== April ===
- 19 — 1,500 gays and supporters rally on the steps of the state capitol in St. Paul, Minnesota, in support of the gay rights provision in the city's human rights ordinance.
- 25 — St. Paul, Minnesota, voters repeal a provision in the city's human rights ordinance that protects gays and lesbians from discrimination. The ordinance is repealed by a 2-to-1 margin; 54,096 in favor of repeal, 31,694 against.

=== May ===
- 9 — Voters in the U.S. city of Wichita, Kansas, repeal a gay rights ordinance by a nearly 5-to-1 margin; 47,276 for repeal, 10,500 against.
- 23 — Voters in the U.S. city of Eugene, Oregon, repeal an ordinance banning discrimination against gays and lesbians by a 2-to-1 margin.

=== June ===
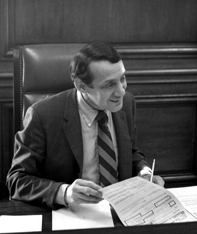
Harvey Milk (1930–1978)

- 24 — In Sydney, a gay and lesbian protest march is held on International Gay Solidarity Day to commemorate the Stonewall riots in the United States. Although the organizers of the march obtain permission, it is revoked on short notice and police break up the march. Fifty-three marchers are arrested, although charges are eventually dropped.
- 25 — The rainbow flag is first used as a symbol of gay pride. The original 8-striped version, designed by Gilbert Baker, first flies in the San Francisco Gay Freedom Day Parade.

=== July ===
- 1 — A gay protest rally is held in Moose Jaw, Saskatchewan, Canada, in response to a visit by Anita Bryant.
- 5 — The Quebec Commission des droits de la personne et des droits de la jeunesse (Human Rights and Youth Rights Commission) rules that a Montreal Catholic school board's refusal to rent facilities to a gay group is discriminatory. This represents the first application of Quebec's anti-sexual-orientation-discrimination law since it was passed in 1977.
- 27 — U.S. state of New Jersey repeals its anti-sodomy laws.

=== September ===
- 10 — A protest is held in London, Ontario, Canada, in response to a visit by Anita Bryant.

=== November ===
- 7
  - California Proposition 6, the Briggs Initiative, which would have forbidden gays to teach in schools, is defeated in California by a two-to-one margin. U.S. president Jimmy Carter announced his opposition to this measure at a rally in the state, the first such mention by a U.S. president.
  - The attempted repeal of a gay rights ordinance in Seattle, Washington, is also defeated by a two-to-one margin.
- 27 — Moscone–Milk assassinations occur in San Francisco. Mayor George Moscone and Supervisor Harvey Milk are assassinated at San Francisco City Hall by former city supervisor Dan White. That night a candlelight march 30,000 people marched from Castro Street to City Hall in memory of the slain men.

== Deaths ==
- November 27 — San Francisco mayor George Moscone and member of the Board of Supervisors Harvey Milk. Milk, a gay activist, was the first openly gay man to hold an office at this high of a level in a major U.S. city.

== See also ==
- Timeline of LGBT history — timeline of events from 12,000 BCE to present
- LGBT rights by country or territory — current legal status around the world
- LGBT social movements
