= Sara Radstone =

British ceramic artist and lecturer

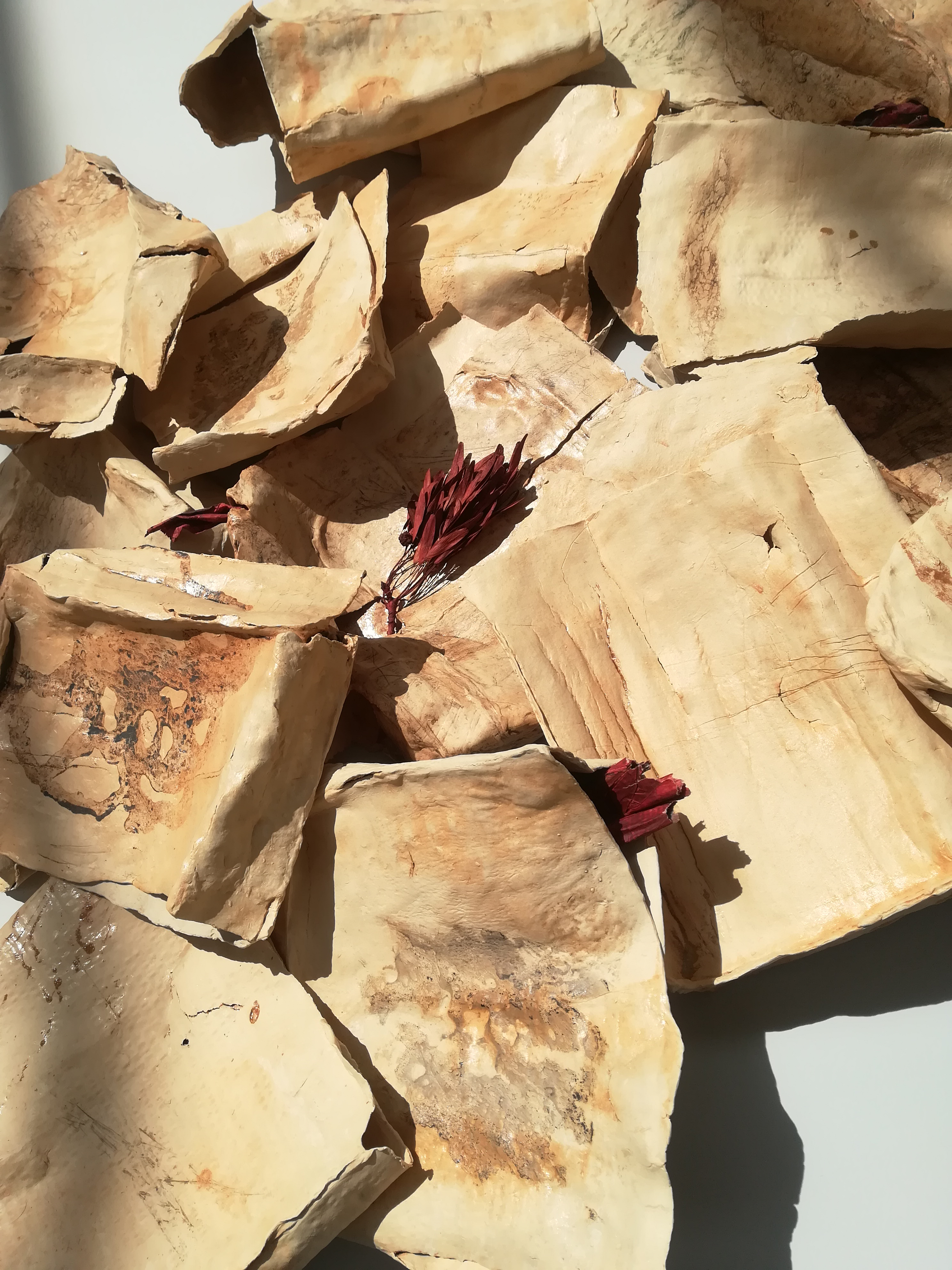
'Untold' 2017. An installation of 27 elements; paper clay and mixed media.

Sara Radstone (born 1955) is a British ceramic artist and lecturer. Her work ranges from intimate wall based sculpture to large scale installations of multiple elements.

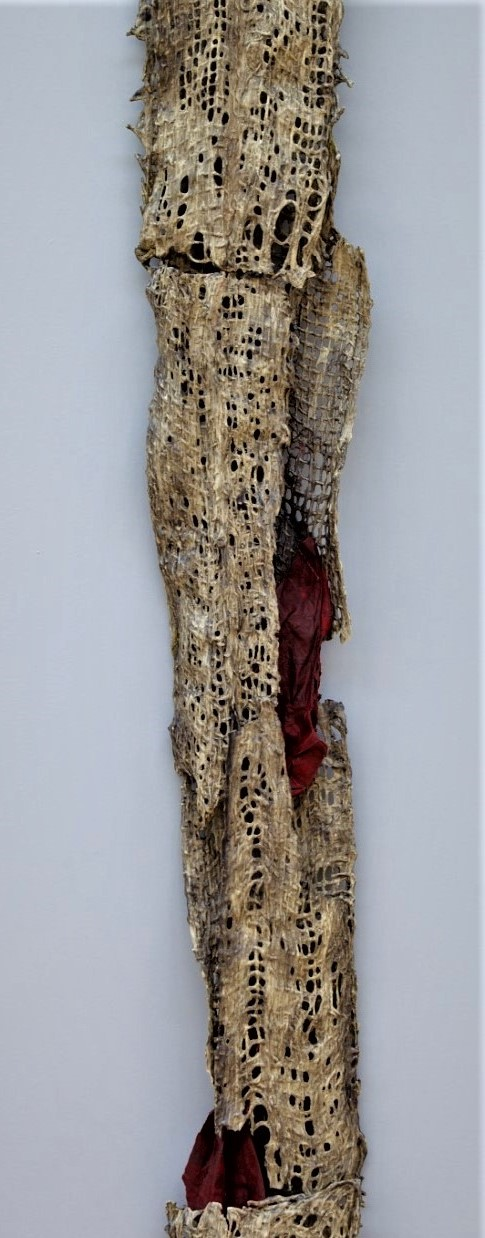
'Shroud III' 2017. Detail of wall based sculpture, slip-dipped hessian scrim, paint-stained newsprint

Radstone trained at Herefordshire College of Arts and later at the Camberwell College of Arts, from where she graduated in 1979 as part of a cohort that included Angus Suttie and Henry Pim. Her work is included in numerous public collections both in the UK and overseas, including four works in the Victoria and Albert Museum, the Fitzwilliam Museum, the British Council, the Shigaraki Ceramic Cultural Park, Japan and Los Angeles County Museum of Art.

She lives and works in South East London.

== Career ==
=== Work ===
In 1979 Radstone established her first studio at 401½ Workshops in South London, receiving a grant from the Crafts Council, followed by an award from the Robert and Lisa Sainsbury Trust, who also supported the establishment of Arlingford Studios in Brixton, South London in 1985. She also received awards from Greater London Arts, the Oppenheim-John Downes Memorial Trust and won the Unilever Prize in 1988. In 1993 she was a recipient of the inaugural Arts Foundation Fellowship. Radstone was a contributor to the conference, Culture and the Unconscious at SOAS, London, and she was a participant at the St. George's House, Windsor Castle, consultation, The Value of Culture and the Crisis of Judgement. In 2020 she delivered the annual Henry Hammond Memorial Lecture.

=== Exhibitions ===
Radstone has exhibited internationally for over 40 years. In addition to regular solo exhibitions at Marsden Woo Gallery in London, she has had solo exhibitions at a variety of galleries and museums, and participated in group shows in Europe, the US and Japan.

A major retrospective exhibition of her career, titled More than Words, was held in 2017–18 at the York Art Gallery's Centre of Ceramic Art. In 2019 she was a joint organiser of Unearthed, a three-person exhibition at the House Mill, Three Mills Island, London.

=== Teaching ===
Radstone has taught and lectured throughout her career, both in the UK and abroad. She has held positions at Camberwell College of Art, University of the Arts, London; University for the Creative Arts, Farnham; Wimbledon School of Art, London; Portsmouth Polytechnic and The University of Colorado, Boulder, USA. Since 1994 Radstone has taught on the Ceramics Diploma Course at the City Lit in London. Institutions where she has been a visiting lecturer include New York State College of Ceramics at Alfred University, as well as a number of other colleges in North America; also at universities in South Korea and Ireland.

== Writing ==
- Catalogue essay for 79/97, An Lanntair and tour;
- 'An Exemplary Artist', catalogue essay for Angus Suttie 1946-1993, published by Contemporary Applied Arts 1994;
- Obituary: Angus Suttie, Crafts, September/October 1993;
- 'Builders of Dreams', Crafts, March/April 1987;
- Review, Crafts, May/June 1986;
- 'The Whole Works', essay for Angus Suttie exhibition catalogue, Anatol Orient 1985.
