= Emmanuel Cooper =

British studio potter, LGBT rights activist, and writer (1938 – 2012)

Emmanuel Cooper OBE
- Born: 12 December 1938; Pilsley, Derbyshire, England
- Died: 21 January 2012 (aged 73); London, England
- Education: University for the Creative Arts; Middlesex University
- Known for: Ceramics
- Spouse: David Horbury (civil partnership 2006)
- Website: Official website

Emmanuel Cooper OBE (12 December 1938 – 21 January 2012) was a British studio potter, advocate for LGBT rights and writer on arts and crafts.

== Biography ==
Born in Pilsley, North East Derbyshire, Cooper studied at the University for the Creative Arts. He also achieved a PhD degree at Middlesex University. He was a member of the Crafts Council and the editor of Ceramic Review. Since 1999, he was visiting Professor of Ceramics and Glass at the Royal College of Art. He was the author of many books on ceramics, including his definitive biography of Bernard Leach that was published in 2003 (Yale University Press), and was also the editor of The Ceramics Book, published in 2006.

In the early 1970s, he was also a cofounder of the Gay Left collective, and remained a prominent LGBT rights campaigner throughout his life. He also published several studies of LGBT art, including The Sexual Perspective and Fully Exposed: The Male Nude in Photography.

As a potter, Cooper's work falls into one of two general forms. In the first his vessels are heavily glazed in a volcanic form. The vessels, as a result of this heavy glazing, derive a lot of their appeal from their varied and uneven textures. In their most simple form they are very reminiscent of work by Lucie Rie. In their more extravagant forms though the vessels can be banded or use incredibly vivid colors to great effect including pink, vibrant yellow and deep reds and blues. His other form of work is much simpler in style using plain glazes, often in egg yolk yellow, occasionally spotted with gold flecks. Cooper was a member of the Red Rose Guild.

His work can be found in the Victoria & Albert Museum, the National Museum of Scotland and the Philadelphia Museum of Art, as well as in many private collections. He was awarded an OBE for services to art in 2002.

'People's Art: working class art from 1750 to the present day' by Emmanuel Cooper, Mainstream Publishing, 1994. This book was preceded by a long research project in the basements of museums and galleries around the UK which Emmanuel hoped would result in a major touring exhibition, if not a new institution devoted to people's art. The British art establishment was not welcoming of his idea.

Cooper died in London on 21 January 2012.
