= Eugene Local Measure 51 =

1978 anti-gay petition in Eugene, Oregon

Eugene local measure 51
- May 23, 1978
- Referendum petition - measure repealing Ordinance No. 18080, prohibiting discrimination on the basis of sexual orientation.

Results
Choice	Votes	%
Yes	22,898	63.04%
No	13,427	36.96%
Valid votes	36,325	100.00%
Invalid or blank votes	0	0.00%
Total votes	36,325	100.00%

Eugene Local Measure 51 was a 1978 petition calling for a referendum in Eugene, Oregon, to repeal Ordinance no. 18080, which prohibited sexual orientation discrimination in the city. VOICE (Volunteer Organization in Community Enactments) created and campaigned for the petition, and gathered enough signatures to force a referendum vote. Measure 51 passed with 22,898 votes for and 13,427 against. This bill's passage garnered national attention, with Miami anti-gay activist Anita Bryant's telegram congratulating VOICE on the victory. It is the earliest example of 35 ballot measures to limit gay rights in Oregon.

== Ordinance no. 18080 ==
On October 24, 1977, the Eugene City Council heard the proposition of Ordinance no. 18080, an amendment to the Eugene Human Rights Ordinance. This ordinance would add sexual orientation to the list of classes protected against discrimination in the areas of housing, public accommodation, and employment. The Eugene Human Rights Council approved the ordinance.

The president of the Human Rights Council told the city council that the proposal wouldn’t endorse any non-majority sexual behavior. He also stated that it would not outlaw any prejudices but would only help protect citizens' constitutional rights. Other proponents of the bill shared personal experiences of discrimination as evidence for why the resolution was needed.

The opposition argued that allowing homosexual behavior would erode the morality of the Eugene community. People also feared that homosexuals were attempting to infiltrate the school system and that the passage of this ordinance would increase the number of child molestation cases.

During closed discussion between the council members, Council Member Williams suggested adding an amendment to the ordinance to allow sexual orientation to be considered when employing people who work with children, specifically between the ages of 12 and 15, due to a concerns that having homosexual role models during formative years would influence children to become gay. Other members disagreed stating that the concerns were based on unreasonable fears, rather than any evidence.

The vote for adding the amendment failed, but the main ordinance passed with a non-unanimous vote, requiring second hearing. Before the second hearing, VOICE started gathering signatures for petitions to trigger a referendum. In the primary election of November 28, 1977, Measure 18080 passed. The Register-Guard had an article the next day saying, "that wasn’t the last the community will hear of the issue."

== Measure 51 ==
A plan for repeal for Ordinance no.18080 began only 14 hours after it was passed at the November 28, 1977, City Council meeting. VOICE led a rigorous campaign against the ordinance. Enough signatures were gathered, and it was added to the Primary Election Ballot as Local Bill Measure 51. Repeal of Ordinance no. 18080 would legalize discrimination based on sexual orientation in housing, jobs, and public accommodations.

Eugene Citizens for Human Rights were the main opponents of the measure. They argued that the LGBT community needed protection against and a guarantee they won’t be discriminated against for their sexual orientation. However, VOICE argued that the ordinance gave the LGBT community unfair privileges and would encourage inappropriate public conduct. Organizers used door-to-door canvassing to educate likely opponents of Measure 51 on gay visibility.

A public debate was planned at Junction City High School, which was well known for hosting fair debates on controversial subjects. However, the debate was cancelled due to complaints from parents.

On May 19, 1978, Martin Rosenberg of the Capital Journal wrote, "Network television news crews, newspaper reporters and national news magazine writers have descended on the city in recent days."

The primary was held on May 23, 1978. Eugene Mayor Gus Keller read the results of the vote: 22,898 for the repeal, and 13,427 against, thus repealing Ordinance no. 18080.

After the win VOICE campaign organization leader Lynn Greene said, "The idea that this is a human rights issue is a facade and people recognized that." The Associated Press carried the story that Miami anti-gay activist Anita Bryant sent a telegram to Larry Dean, congratulating VOICE and "the Christian public and all the citizens of Eugene who worked and voted against legalized immorality".

The Dispatch of Lexington, North Carolina, explored reasons why voters in Eugene and elsewhere repealed such laws passed by legislators, quoting Arthur C. Warren, a board member of the Sexual Law Reporter: "I think in all cases legislators are more intelligent—less exposed to the myths."

St. Paul and Wichita also held referendums on LGBT rights in 1978. Though these were local measures, they sparked a national conversation. Gay rights activists created a Tri-Cities Defense Fund to fundraise jointly against all three referendums. After Measure 51 passed, activists in San Francisco held a protest against it. Terry Bean, one of the Eugene gay activists who advocated against Measure 51, later went on to co-found the Human Rights Campaign and the LGBTQ Victory Fund.

== See also ==
- 1970s in LGBT rights
- Discrimination against LGBT people in the United States
- LGBT culture in Eugene, Oregon
