= Lesbian and Gay Studies: An Introductory, Interdisciplinary Approach =

2000 book

- Author: Theo Sandfort, Judith Schuyf, Jan Willem Duyvendak and Jeffrey Weeks
- Language: English
- Publisher: Sage
- Publication date: 2000
- Pages: 256
- ISBN: 978-0761954187

Lesbian and Gay Studies: An Introductory, Interdisciplinary Approach is a book edited by Theo Sandfort, Judith Schuyf, Jan Willem Duyvendak and Jeffrey Weeks. It was published by Sage Publishing in 2000.
