= Jeffrey Weeks (sociologist) =

British historian and sociologist

Jeffrey Weeks OBE
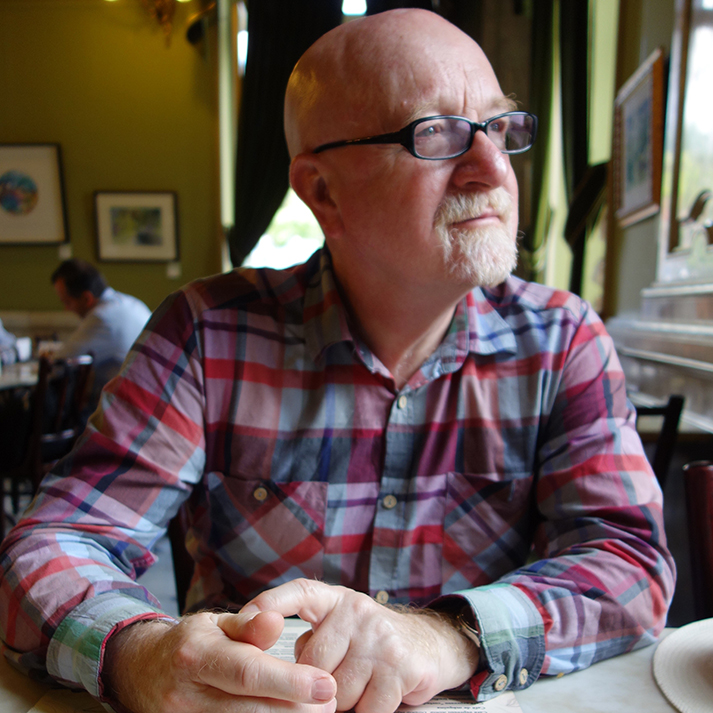
- Portrait of Jeffrey Weeks by Mark McNestry
- Born: 1945 (age 80–81); Porth, Rhondda, Wales
- Occupations: Historian, sociologist
- Movement: Gay Left; New Left
- Partner: Angus Suttie

Academic background
- Education: University College London; University of Kent (PhD, 1983)

Academic work
- Institutions: London School of Economics
- Main interests: Gender and sexuality
- Notable works: Sex, Politics and Society (1989); Sexuality (1986)

Jeffrey Weeks is a British historian and sociologist specialising in work on gender and sexuality. He is among the academics in the early period of gay men's studies in Britain that emerged from the Gay Liberation Front (GLF) which he joined in 1970 and the Gay Left of which he was a founding member. He has been described as "the most significant British intellectual working on sexuality to emerge from the radical sexual movements of the 1970s.”

== Early life ==
Weeks was born in 1945 in the small town of Porth in the Rhondda Valleys in South Wales, historically one of the most famous coal mining areas in the world. His parents were both from mining stock. He grew up in a loving family in an overwhelmingly working class area where a strong sense of community was the basis for everyday life, and was educated in local schools and at Porth County Grammar School, one of the leading boys’ schools in the area. But he increasingly felt a tension between the strongly conservative gender and sexual values of the mining valleys and his own developing sexuality. He left home to go to university in London in 1964, and studied at University College London (1964–1969), where he obtained a BA (Hons) in history in 1967, followed by an MPhil in the history of political theory. His years as a student in London gave him the opportunity to explore his sexuality fully, and to begin to live a queer life.

== Gay Liberation ==
The beginning of the Gay Liberation Front in London in October 1970, proved to be a transformative moment in his life. Through his involvement, he came out publicly as gay, encountered new radical ideologies and beliefs, got involved in social activism, and met new lifelong friends and his first long-term partner, Angus Suttie, later an innovative potter. With Angus, he was a founder member of the Gay Left journal which became a focus for debate about gay liberation and the left, and provided an opportunity for Weeks to begin writing about the history and sociology of gay politics and wider sexualities. Through early books, including Socialism and the New Life (with Sheila Rowbotham); Coming Out (1977), a study of the history of homosexual politics in Britain; Sex, Politics and Society (1981); Sexuality and Its Discontents (1985), and Sexuality (1986), he developed an influential critique of essentialist theories of sexuality and gender (that is approaches which relied on deterministic biological and psychological explanations for sexual behaviour). He emphasised instead the social and historical factors which shape sexual values and identities and gendered assumptions, an approach that became known as social constructionism - though Weeks rarely used that term himself, regarding it as too mechanistic and narrow.

== Academic career ==
Weeks’ research and writings on sexuality made it difficult at first for him to obtain a permanent academic post. He taught and researched at a number of universities, including London School of Economics, University of Essex, University of Southampton, and University of the West of England, Bristol, where he first became a full professor, finally moving to London South Bank University (LSBU) in 1994 as professor of sociology. He was the executive dean of arts and human sciences at LSBU (2003–2008). He was also the director of the Social Policy and Urban Regeneration Research Institute (SPUR) in 2005–2009, and university director of research. He subsequently became emeritus professor of sociology at LSBU. He has been on the editorial board of several journals, including History Workshop Journal, the Journal of the History of Sexuality, the Journal of Homosexuality, the Sociological Review and Victorian Studies; and has delivered lectures and seminars in a wide range of conferences and universities in Europe, Australia, Latin America and North America. His articles and books have been translated into a number of languages, including French, Spanish, Catalan, Serbian, German, Chinese and Japanese.

== Honours ==
Weeks was featured in the 2017 Pinc List of leading LGBTQ figures in Wales. He is a fellow of the Royal Society of Arts (FRSA), Fellow of the Academy of Social Sciences (FacSS), and was appointed Officer of the Order of the British Empire (OBE) in the 2012 Birthday Honours for services to social science.

== Personal life ==
He lives in London with Mark McNestry, his life-partner since 1990. They became civil partners in 2006.

== Authored publications (selected) ==
- Socialism and the New Life (with Sheila Rowbotham), Pluto Press, 1977. ISBN 0-904383-52-0 (pbk); ISBN 0-904383-53-9 (hbk); trans in Catalan, Sheila Rowbotham and Jeffrey Weeks, Dos Pioneros de la Liberacion Sexual: Edward Carpenter y Havelok Ellis. Homosexualidad, feminismo y socialismo, Barcelona: Editorial Anagrama 1978, ISBN 84-339-1308-5
- Coming Out: Homosexual Politics in Britain from the Nineteenth Century to the Present, Quartet Books 1977; ISBN 0-7043-2146-7 (hbk); ISBN 0-7043-3175-6 (pbk). 2nd revised edition, with new chapter and bibliography, 1990, ISBN 0-7043-0123-7
- Sex, Politics and Society. The Regulation of Sexuality since 1800, Longman 1981; 2nd edition, with additional chapter and new bibliography, 1989 ISBN 0-582-48333-6; 2nd edition, with additional chapter and new bibliography, 1989, ISBN 0-582-02383-1. Sex, Politics and Society: The Regulation of Sexuality since 1800, 3rd, fully revised edition, Routledge, xvi + 445 pp., 2012. ISBN 978-1-4082-4830-0 (limp)
- Sexuality and its Discontents: Meanings, Myths and Modern Sexualities, Routledge and Kegan Paul, 1985. ISBN 0-415-04503-7 (hbk); ISBN 0-7102-0565-1 (pbk) Published in Spanish edition as El Malestar de la Sexualidad: Significados, Mitos y Sexualidades Modernas, Madrid, Talasa Ediciones S.L, 1993, ISBN 84-88119-11-9
- Sexuality, Ellis Horwood/Tavistock, 1986. ISBN 0-85312-879-0 (hbk); ISBN 0-7458-0002-5 (bbk). Published in Spanish translation as Sexualidad, Mexico City, PUEG/ Editorial Paidos, 1998. Published in Japanese, 1999. Revised second English edition, Routledge 2003, ISBN 0-415-28285-3 (hbk); ISBN 978-0-415-49712-1 (pbk). Third revised edition, pp xii + 194, Routledge 2009, ISBN 0-415-49711-6 (hbk), ISBN 0-415-49712-4 (pbk), ISBN 0-203-87741-1 (ebk). ISBN 978-0-415-49711-4 (hbk), ISBN 978-0-415-49712-1 (pbk), ISBN 978-0-203-87741-8 (ebk). Fourth revised edition, xxii + 281pp, London, Routledge 2017, ISBN 978-1-138-02288-1 (hbk), 02289 8 (pbk), ISBN 978-1-315-77681-1 (ebk)
- Between the Acts. Lives of Homosexual Men 1885-1967 (with Kevin Porter), Routledge, 1990; 2nd edition, with new Preface, Rivers Oram Press, 1998. ISBN 0-415-00944-8; 2nd edition, with new Preface, Rivers Oram Press, 1998, ISBN 1-85489-093-X
- Against Nature: Essays on History, Sexuality and Identity, Rivers Oram Press, 1991 ISBN 1-85489-004-2
- Invented Moralities. Sexual Values in an Age of Uncertainty, UK: Polity Press 1995, ISBN 0-7456-1368-3. USA: Columbia University Press, 1995, ISBN 0-231-10410-3
- Making Sexual History, Polity Press, 2000, pp x + 256, ISBN 0-7456-2114-7 (HB), ISBN 0-7456-2115-5 (PB); Chinese language edition, Nanjing 2001
- Same Sex Intimacies: Families of Choice and other Life Experiments (with Brian Heaphy and Catherine Donovan), Routledge, 2001, pp ix + 245, ISBN 0-415-25476-0 (hbk), ISBN 0-415-25477-9 (pbk)
- The World We Have Won: The Remaking of Erotic and Intimate Life, xvi + 269, Routledge 2007, ISBN 978-0-415-42200-0 (hbk), 42201 7 (pbk)
- The Languages of Sexuality, pp. xvi + 247, Routledge, 2011, ISBN 978-0-415-37572-6 (hbk), ISBN 978-0-415-37573-3 (pbk), ISBN 978-0-203-93032-8 (ebk). Spanish translation as Lenguajes de la Sexualidad, trans Pablo I Betesh,, Ediciones Nueva Vision SAIC, Buenos Aires, 2012, ISBN 978-950-602-637-0
- Sexuelle Gleichberechtigung: Gender, Sexualität und Homosexuuelle Emanzipation in Europe, Bundesstiftung Magnus Hirschfeld, Hirschfeld Lectures 4, Gottingen, Wallstein Verlag, 2014, pp. 59, ISBN 978-3-8353-1324-8
- Sexualité, translation of 3rd edition by Samuel, Baudry, Colette Collomb-Boreau, Baudouin Millet, Françoise Orazi et Nathalie Zimpfer, with new Preface by author, and Introduction to the work of Jeffrey Weeks by Rommel Mendès-Leite, Lyon: Presses Universitaires de Lyon 2014, ISBN 978-2-7297-0864-1, ISSN 2257-2678
- Protive Prirode: Ogledi o Društvenom Konstruisanju Identiteta [Against Nature: The Social Construction of Identities], pp. 127, Belgrade: Karpos, 2015, ISBN 978-86-6435-011-2
- What is Sexual History?, Polity Press, 2016, ISBN 978-0-7456-8024-8, and 8025 (pb). Translated as Ecrire l’Histoire des Sexualités, Press Universitaires de Lyon, 2019, ISBN 978-2-7297-0943-3
- Coming Out: The Emergence of LGBT Identities in Britain from the 19th Century to the Present, 40th Anniversary edition, revised and updated, xxvi + 338 pp, Quartet Books 2016, ISBN 978-0-7043-7417-1
- Sex, Politics and Society: The Regulation of Sexuality since 1800, 4th, fully revised edition, Routledge, 2018. ISBN 978-1-138-96317-7; 3184 (pbk); 1525 (ebk)
- Between Worlds: A Queer Boy from the Valleys, Parthian, 2021, xviii + 272, ISBN 978-1-912681-88-4, ISBN 978-1-912681-92-1
- Sexuality 5, 5th edition, London: Routledge 2023, ISBN 978-1-032-10532-1 (hbk); 10534 5 (pbk); 21575 2 (ebk)
- Sandfort, Theo, ed. (2010). Lesbian and gay studies: an introductory, interdisciplinary approach. London Thousand Oaks, Calif: SAGE. ISBN 978-0-7619-5418-7.
