= Terry Bean =

American activist

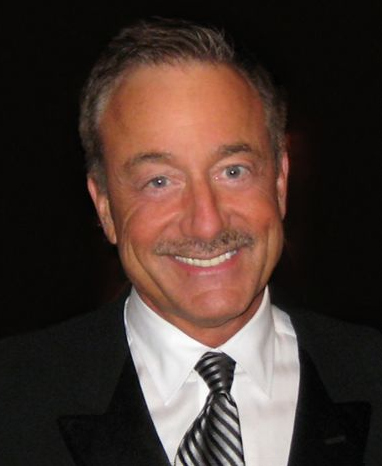
- Terry Bean at a Human Rights Campaign event, 2007
- Education: University of Oregon
- Occupations: Bean Investment Real Estate, President and CEO
- Website: www.terry-bean.com

Terrence Patrick Bean is an American political fundraiser, a civil rights activist, and LGBTQ rights movement activist. He is known for co-founding several national LGBTQ rights organizations, including the Human Rights Campaign and the Gay & Lesbian Victory Fund. As of 2012, he is the CEO and President of Bean Investment Real Estate and resides in Portland, Oregon. Since 2014, Bean had been the subject of sexual assault allegations; all charges were dismissed in January 2022.

== Early life ==
Terry Bean is a fifth-generation Oregonian and was born in Portland, Oregon. He is the son of Ormond and Jean Bean. He graduated from Lake Oswego High School, after which he attended the University of Oregon on the Chick Evans Golf Scholarship, graduating with a bachelor's degree in political science.

Bean first became active in politics during college as a member of the anti-Vietnam War movement. In 1971, he began lobbying the Oregon State Legislature and the city council of Eugene, Oregon, and helped work on a gay rights ordinance, which passed in 1977. City Ordinance No. 18080 produced an anti-gay backlash and was overturned by voters in Eugene in a referendum on May 23, 1978. Bean was a leader in the campaign to defeat the referendum and coordinated efforts with Harvey Milk. In 1979, Bean helped to organize the National March on Washington for Lesbian and Gay Rights.

== Human Rights Campaign ==
The late 1970s saw a rash of successful anti-gay ballot measures around the country. Realizing that their state-by-state efforts were failing, leaders of the LGBTQ rights movement decided to focus their efforts on the national level. This led to the founding by Bean and others of the Gay Rights National Lobby (GRNL) and the Human Rights Campaign Fund (HRCF), two groups which later merged to become the Human Rights Campaign (HRC).

Bean was the primary fundraiser for GRNL, when it was still a new organization, and created the "GRNL 48", a club of top donors who contributed $1,200 or more per year. In its early history, the group found it difficult to find politicians willing to accept campaign contributions from a gay PAC. The GRNL 48 eventually became the HRC's Federal Club.

Bean has been on the Human Rights Campaign's Board of Directors since 1980. He is also a member of its Foundation Board and its Public Policy Committee, and takes part in deciding the organization's political endorsements.

=== HRC headquarters building ===
In 2000, the HRC launched its Capitol Campaign to raise the funds to purchase a suitable headquarters in the nation's capital. Bean was a co-chair of this campaign. In 2002, the HRC acquired a medium-rise office building in Washington, DC, from B'nai B'rith International to use as its national headquarters. Joe Solmonese, the executive director of HRC, has said that Terry Bean was instrumental in acquiring the building. Elizabeth Birch, the executive director of the organization during the time when the building was purchased, believes that Bean's background in real estate was crucial in the purchase. "All of us had very healthy skepticism. Generally, nonprofits do not buy buildings... But there was only one guy in the crowd who said, 'We have to do this. This is historic...' And it was the guy who knew most about Real Estate and that was Terry."

=== Gay and Lesbian Victory Fund ===
In 1991, Terry Bean and Vic Basile, the first executive director of the Human Rights Campaign Fund, founded the Gay and Lesbian Victory Fund, a Political Action Committee (PAC) to raise money for gay and lesbian candidates.

== Other political and community involvement ==
In Oregon, Bean co-founded the Right to Privacy PAC with four others in the early 1980s. The Portland-based group was the first statewide gay rights PAC in Oregon.

In 1989, Bean co-founded the Equity Foundation, a Portland-based philanthropic organization that gives grants to LGBTQ community groups and programs as well as academic scholarships. Until it merged into the Pride Foundation in 2016, Bean was a member of the board of advisors, along with then Portland Mayor Sam Adams and former Oregon Governor Barbara Roberts.

Ted Kulongoski, then governor of Oregon, declared August 23, 2008 to be "Terry Bean Equality Day" to recognize Bean's gay rights efforts.

In 2018, Bean spearheaded a campaign to rename SW Stark, a prominent street in downtown Portland, Oregon, to SW Harvey Milk Street after LGBTQ activist Harvey Milk. On June 14, 2018, Portland City Council voted unanimously in support of the change.

=== Fundraising ===
Terry Bean's political involvement is often behind the scenes as a fundraiser, which has assisted in the initial success of several organizations, including the Gay Rights National Lobby and the Gay and Lesbian Victory Fund.

In 1992, Bean helped raise over $1,000,000 in the successful campaign to defeat the anti-gay Oregon Measure 9, which would have amended the state constitution with a provision declaring homosexuality "abnormal, wrong, unnatural, and perverse".

=== Role in the Democratic Party ===
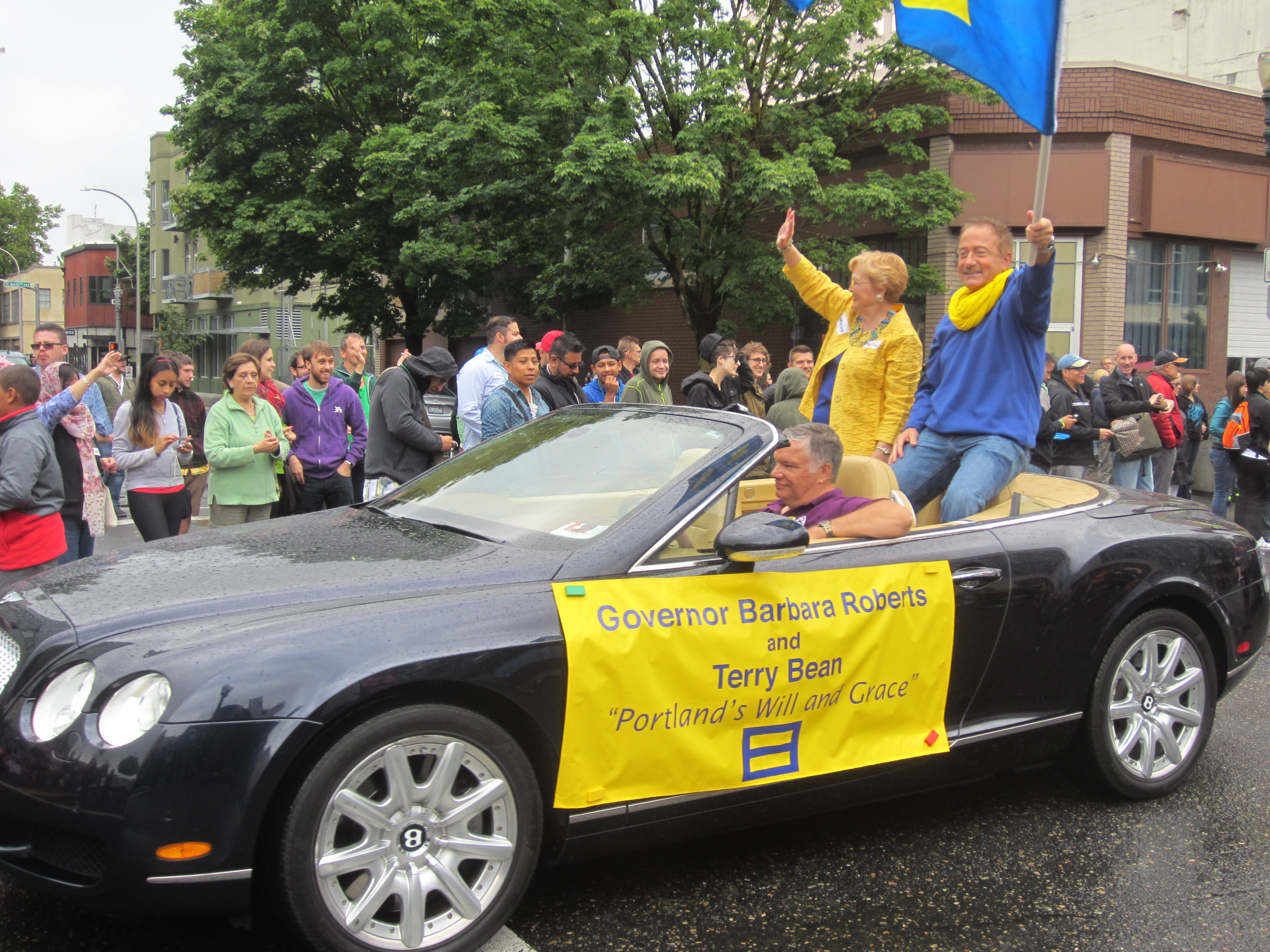
Bean and former Governor Barbara Roberts at the 2014 Portland Pride Parade

Terry Bean has been a lifelong Democrat and has considerable influence in the party as a member of the Democratic National Committee since at least 2009. Among his contributions are his fundraising for Bill Clinton, serving on the DNC's Convention Committee in 2000, serving as a co-chair of Howard Dean's 2004 National Finance Committee, and being the first LGBTQ member of Barack Obama's National Finance Committee. He was the main fundraiser for Oregon Governor Barbara Roberts' 1990 campaign.

In 2008, Bean launched the LGBT for Obama campaign website, which served as a fundraising tool and a means of outreach to the LGBTQ community. In 2012, Bean raised more than $500,000 for Obama's re-election campaign, and visited the White House at least six times between 2012 and 2014.

=== Friendship with Senator Gordon Smith ===
Former Oregon Senator Gordon H. Smith, a Republican, was elected in 1996 as a social conservative. After the election, Bean, who had campaigned against Smith, had a meeting with the new senator, in which they reached an unexpected understanding. Smith, a conservative Mormon, was able to relate to Bean's experience as a member of a marginalized demographic because of his own experiences. Referring to his Mormon heritage, Smith said of Bean, "When you grow up as part of a group that has suffered discrimination, it is easier to listen with feeling to the stories of others, like Terry, who have felt the jackboot on the back of their neck. For me, empathy is a call to action."

Smith cited his "unlikely and unexpected" friendship with Bean as a factor in his decision to break with his party and champion several LGBTQ causes, saying of Bean, "He really played a significant role in opening my heart and opening my mind to the perspective of a gay man in Oregon."

Smith co-sponsored the Employment Non-discrimination Act (ENDA), the Ryan White Care Act, and teamed up with Senator Ted Kennedy to introduce a hate crimes protection bill. Smith regularly read incidents of anti-LGBTQ hate crimes into the congressional record to raise awareness of this issue. In comments on the Senate floor to mark the successful passage of the Ryan White Care Act, Smith referred to Bean as "...a highly valued advisor on issues affecting the gay and lesbian community in Oregon". Smith's support of LGBTQ rights won him the endorsement of the Human Rights Campaign for his 2002 re-election bid, although Bean did not personally endorse him.

== Sex abuse accusation ==
On November 19, 2014, Terry Bean was arrested on charges of sodomy and sex abuse in a case involving a 15-year-old boy, in what Bean's lawyer Kristen Winemiller characterized as an extortion attempt by an ex-lover. Law enforcement sources said Bean was charged with "two counts of sodomy in the third degree, a felony, and sex abuse in the third degree, a misdemeanor." He was arraigned in Lane County, Oregon, where the crimes allegedly occurred in 2013.

After the case continued for over a year, lawyers for Bean and the youth reached a civil agreement, which the judge ultimately rejected. The alleged victim declined to testify, his attorney Lori Deveny stating that "he did not seek out this prosecution and made his unwillingness to testify known at every step of the process". The judge dismissed the case on September 1, 2015, without prejudice. In a statement, Bean wrote, "I take some measure of comfort that the world now knows what I have always known – that I was falsely accused and completely innocent of every accusation that was made." On January 4, 2019, Bean was re-indicted on the same charges. In March 2019, the alleged victim filed a civil lawsuit against Bean. In September 2019, Bean's former partner was found guilty of third-degree sodomy and third-degree sexual abuse, which The Oregonian reported as "a blow" to Bean's claims of innocence. Bean was originally to be put on trial for similar charges in November of that year, but the trial was postponed.

On January 14, 2022, all criminal charges against Bean were dismissed because the alleged victim declined to participate in prosecution.

== See also ==
- List of LGBTQ people from Portland, Oregon
