= Richard Dyer =

British academic, queer theorist and film critic

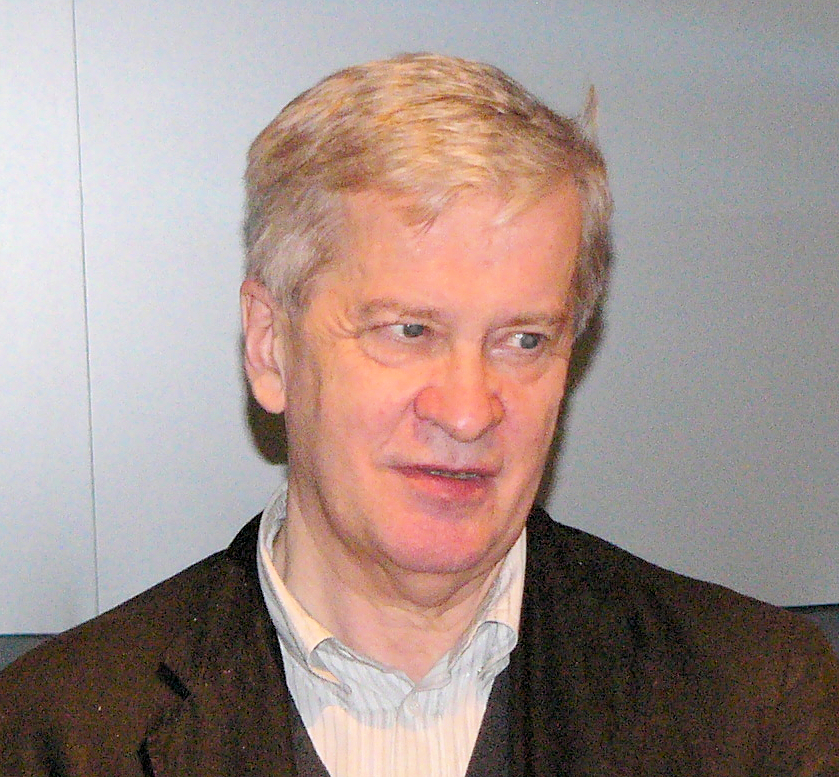
- Dyer in 2010
- Born: 1945 (age 80–81)

Academic background
- Education: University of St Andrews; University of Birmingham

Academic work
- Discipline: Film studies
- Sub-discipline: Gay cinema; Italian cinema; queer theory; experimental animation
- Institutions: University of Warwick; King's College London

Richard Dyer (born 1945) is an English academic who was a professor of film studies at King's College London. Specialising in Italian cinema, queer theory, and entertainment media's representations of race, he was a faculty member of the Film Studies Department at the University of Warwick for many years and has held visiting professorships in the United Kingdom, the United States, Italy, Sweden, Denmark, and Germany.

== Career ==
Born in Leeds in 1945 to a lower-middle class and raised in the suburbs of London, Dyer studied French (as well as English, German, and philosophy) at the University of St Andrews. He went on to earn his doctoral degree in English at the University of Birmingham's Centre for Contemporary Cultural Studies. During the 1970s, Dyer wrote cultural criticism pieces for Gay Left and then during the 1980s wrote for Marxism Today. In the early 1980s he contributed to the partwork The Movie with a piece on Barbra Streisand.

Before coming to King's College London in 2006, he was a professor of film studies at the University of Warwick. He was an adjunct professor at University College Dublin in 2009 and 2010. He was also a visiting professor at the Annenberg School for Communication at the University of Pennsylvania in 1985; the University of Naples "L'Orientale" in 1987; Stockholm University in 1996, 2006, and 2010; the University of Copenhagen in 2002; New York University in 2003; the University of Bergamo in 2004; Bauhaus University, Weimar, in 2009; the University of St Andrews from 2011 to 2017; and Indiana University Bloomington in 2015. Throughout his career, he has taught courses on race and ethnicity in film, stardom, Hollywood, Italian cinema, Federico Fellini, and representation. Dyer has published widely on whiteness, film music, and queer cultures.

== Works ==
=== White: Essays on Race and Culture ===
Published by Routledge in 1997, White examines the reproduction and preservation of whiteness in visual culture from roughly the 15th century to the late 20th century. Dyer illustrates how whiteness has been and continues to be both invisible and hypervisible. He argues that this occurs because whiteness is both registered on the individual body and exists beyond the corporeal. This is understood through the lens of Christianity, race, and imperialism. Central to these three political projects is what Dyer calls "the sexual reproductive economy of race," or the way whiteness is both preserved and threatened by heterosexuality.

A central element of his argument is intra-racial boundary work among white people. Gender and class create a hierarchy wherein women are read as whiter than men and those of a higher class status as whiter than the lower classes. The third chapter, "The Light of the World", examines the relationship between beauty and whiteness and how white women are visually presented as whiter than their male counterparts through the use of light. Dyer is in conversation with scholars such as David Roediger, Tamsin Wilton, and Susan Jeffords; the work is contributing to whiteness studies, film studies, and gender/sexuality studies.

=== Other notable works ===
Stars (1979) was Dyer's first full-length book. In it he develops the idea that viewers' experience of a film is heavily influenced by the perception of its stars. Dyer analyses critics' writing, magazines, advertising, and films to explore the significance of stardom, with references to Marlon Brando, Marlene Dietrich, Jane Fonda, Greta Garbo, Marilyn Monroe, Robert Redford, and John Wayne.

Heavenly Bodies: Film Stars and Society (1986) continues Dyer's contribution to star studies. Judy Garland, Paul Robeson, and Marilyn Monroe are the primary subjects. Dyer looks at the ways in which audiences simultaneously construct and consume a star's persona, in the process debunking common stereotypes about Garland, Monroe, and Robeson.

In his 2001 book The Culture of Queers, Dyer unpacks the oversimplified term "queer", arguing that it is a sexual identity not merely about specific sexual activities, defining both men who are attracted to other men and those who possess other non-sexual attributes like being effeminate or hyper-masculine. Analysing films genres like film noir and queer actors like Rock Hudson, Dyer frames the trajectory of queer identification and culture with two major historical moments: the first use of the term "homosexual" in 1869 and the Stonewall Riots. Although well-received within the academic community, some scholars have criticised the absence of lesbianism in Dyer's delineation of queer cultural history.

In his 2011 work In the Space of a Song: the Uses of Song in Film, Dyer analyses film musicals like Meet Me in St. Louis and A Star is Born to examine the role of song in film through the lens of race, gender, and sexuality.

Throughout his career he has been commissioned by the British Film Institute to write film analyses, including Seven (1999) and Brief Encounter (1993).

== Public intellectual life ==
Outside academia, Dyer was an active and influential figure in the English Gay Liberation Front and contributed to the journal Gay Left. His article "In Defence of Disco" in Gay Left (1979), was one of the first to take disco seriously as an expression of the new gay consciousness. In his article, Dyer defends disco from critics that say disco traded its values for profit in its crossover to the mainstream, arguing that something's affiliation with capitalism does not mean that it is itself capitalistic. He goes on to say that disco is more than music; it is a culture, dance style, and language, and that it would take more than a crossover into mainstream to negate its significance.

Dyer also organized the first gay cinema event at the National Film Theatre in 1977. The season was entitled "Images of Homosexuality" and featured over 30 films that explored the history of lesbian and gay representation on screen. It was the first season of lesbian and gay cinema to be held within an institutional context in Britain. The event was accompanied by the publication of Gays and Film, a collection of essays he edited.

In 1991, Dyer appeared in Alma Cogan: The Girl with the Giggle in Her Voice. In 1995 he contributed to the documentary film The Celluloid Closet, which explores the history of depictions of lesbians and gay men in American films.

== Awards ==
- Honorary lifetime membership, Society for Cinema and Media Studies, 2007
- Honorary doctorate, University of Turku, 2007
- Honorary doctorate, New England Conservatory of Music, 2007
- Fellowship, British Academy, 2012
- Brudner Prize, Yale University, 2014
- Honorary doctorate, Bordeaux Montaigne University, 2018
- Honorary doctorate, Stockholm University, 2023

== Selected bibliography ==
=== Books ===
- Gays & film. London: British Film Institute. 1977. ISBN 0-918432-58-8.
- Stars. With Paul McDonald. London: British Film Institute. 1979. ISBN 0851700853.
- Heavenly bodies: film stars and society. New York: St. Martin's Press. 1986. ISBN 9780333295410.
- Now you see it: studies on lesbian and gay film. London: Routledge. 1990. ISBN 9780415035569.
- Only entertainment. New York: Routledge. 1992. ISBN 9780415254977.
- Brief encounter. London: British Film Institute. 1993. ISBN 9780851703626.
- The matter of images: essays on representations. London: Routledge. 1993. ISBN 9780415057196.
- White. London New York: Routledge. 1997. ISBN 9780415095372.
- Seven. London: British Film Institute. 1999. ISBN 9780851707235.
- The culture of queers. London: Routledge. 2002. ISBN 9780203996393.
- Pastiche. New York: Routledge. 2007. ISBN 9780415340106.
- Nino Rota: music, film, and feeling. New York: Palgrave Macmillan. 2010. ISBN 9781844572090.
- In the space of a song: the uses of song in film. Abingdon: Routledge. 2012. ISBN 9780203804629.
- Lethal repetition: serial killing in European cinema. London: British Film Institute. 2015. ISBN 9781844573943.

=== Journal articles ===
- Dyer, Richard (Spring 1994). "Idol thoughts: orgasm and self-reflexivity in gay pornography". Critical Quarterly. 36 (1): 49–62. doi:10.1111/j.1467-8705.1994.tb01012.x.

== See also ==
- Gay icon
- Queer theory
- The Celluloid Closet (film)
