= Angus Suttie =

British potter (1946–1993)

- Born: 26 November 1946; Tealing, Scotland
- Died: 17 June 1993 (aged 46); London, England
- Education: Camberwell School of Art
- Known for: Pottery, teaching of art ceramics
- Movement: Gay Left
- Partner: Jeffrey Weeks

Angus Suttie (26 November 1946 – 17 June 1993) was a studio potter and teacher of art ceramics, most notably at Morley College, London. Suttie studied at Camberwell School of Art under Glennys Barton, Ewen Henderson and Colin Pearson. This education promoted experimentation, rejecting the Bernard Leach derived Anglo-oriental style which emphasised wheel-throwing. Having studied together at Camberwell, Angus was invited by Sara Radstone to share her studio space in South London; he and Radstone went on to exhibit together on several occasions, most notably in their two-person show at Contemporary Applied Arts in London's Covent Garden.

== Background ==
Suttie was born on 26 November 1946, in Tealing, Scotland. His initial interest was drama. After completing his education in Art Ceramics, he also completed teacher training at Whitelands College, in Putney, London (1979–80).

== Early works ==
Suttie shaped his articles principally with rolled slabs of leather-hard clay body to create geometric forms, which he cut and reassembled into larger forms. Suttie's preference was for hand-building and he was inspired by objects and forms from pre-industrial societies. These were often in pastiche of traditional domestic objects including anthropomorphic vessels such as jugs and teapots, which were part container and part figurative form. His functional, yet slightly baroque works, are vividly colored, and often stand on oddly positioned legs or are seemingly off-balanced.

== Later works ==
As part of a developing tradition of abstraction in contemporary ceramics, Angus' works became less rectilinear and more organic in appearance and as time went on, much larger than their domestic counterparts. In addition, they became more serious and the protrusions came to resemble rows of thorns or tank tracks.

His later works have been described as reflecting and celebrating his life, personal relationships and his deteriorating health. His work displays a diversity of influences, including contemporary abstract ceramics, modern North American ceramics, and Pre-Columbian American art.

The most recent show of Suttie's work was "Things of Beauty Growing': British Studio Pottery" the newest exhibit at the Yale Center of British Art. The show brings together almost 150 ceramic works of art from around the world, with the goal of exploring the evolution of the ceramic vessel over the past 100 years.

== Literary contributions ==
Suttie was also a contributor to The Ceramic Review, Revue de la Céramique et du Verre, Studio Pottery etc. and his works are held in some significant 20th century ceramics collections around the world, including the Victoria & Albert Museum, Crafts Council, The Fred Marer Collection at the Otis Art Institute in Los Angeles, and the Smart Museum of Art at the University of Chicago.

He was also a member of the Gay Left collective in the 1970s. A memoir of his early years, From Latent to Blatant, was published in issue number 2 of the Gay Left journal and can be accessed at https://web.archive.org/web/20160303170758/http://www.gayleft1970s.org/.

== Death ==
Angus Suttie died on 17 June 1993, of an AIDS-related illness.
