= Carl Wittman =

American activist

Carl Wittman (February 23, 1943 – January 22, 1986) was a member of the national council of Students for a Democratic Society (SDS) and later an activist for LGBT rights. He co-authored "An Interracial Movement of the Poor?" (1963) with Tom Hayden and wrote "A Gay Manifesto" (1970). Wittman declined hospital treatment for AIDS and died of suicide by drug overdose at home in North Carolina.

== Early activism ==
In 1960, Wittman entered Swarthmore College where he became a student activist. Wittman spent summers doing civil rights work in the South, and joined the national council of Students for a Democratic Society (SDS). In 1966, after becoming disillusioned with homophobia in the New Left, Wittman left SDS. Wittman married Mimi Feingold the same year.

In 1967, Wittman moved to San Francisco with Feingold where they lived with other activists in an anti-draft commune. Wittman turned in his draft card to the Oakland Induction Center in October 1967 during Stop the Draft Week.

== Gay activism ==
Wittman, while self-identified as gay since the age of 14, remained closeted until coming out in the late 1960s in an article, "Waves of Resistance," published in the November, 1968 issue of the antiwar magazine, Liberation.

In 1969, Wittman wrote Refugees from Amerika: A Gay Manifesto published by The Red Butterfly cell of the Gay Liberation Front January 1970. It is considered one of the most influential gay liberation writings of the 1970s.

Exclusive heterosexuality is fucked up. It reflects a fear of people of the same sex, it's anti-homosexual, and it is fraught with frustration. Heterosexual sex is fucked up too; ask women's liberation about what straight guys are like in bed. Sex is aggression for the male chauvinist; sex is obligation for the traditional woman.

— Amerika: A Gay Manifesto I.3

In 1971, Wittman moved to Wolf Creek, Oregon with his then-partner, Stevens McClave. Two years later, he began a long-term relationship with a fellow war resister, Allan Troxler, a conscientious objector.

In the early 1980s, Wittman created the North Carolina Lesbian and Gay Health Project (LGHP) with David Jolly, Timmer McBride, and Aida Wakil to address the health needs of sexual minorities in that state.

== Posthumous recognition ==
Carl Wittman was recognized as a Main Honoree by the Sesquicentennial Honors Commission at the Durham 150 Closing Ceremony in Durham, NC on November 2, 2019. The posthumous recognition was bestowed upon 29 individuals "whose dedication, accomplishments and passion have helped shape Durham in important ways."
