= LGBTQ culture in Salem, Oregon =

The American city of Salem, Oregon is considered generally LGBTQ-friendly. In 2017, Salem ranked highest among cities in Oregon for having "the most LGBTQ-friendly policies and inclusiveness", scoring 90 out of 100 on the Human Rights Campaign's Municipal Equality Index. According to the Statesman Journal, "Salem scored perfectly on its non-discrimination laws, law enforcement and municipal services. The city lost points for not having transgender-inclusive health benefits and city leadership's lack of pro-equality legislative and policy efforts." The score has since improved to 100 out of 100 as of 2025. The city of Salem has a LGBTQIA+ Rights Committee that was established in 2017.

In 2022, the Salem-Keizer School District established policies aimed at improving the "safety, wellbeing, education and success" of transgender and non-binary students. In 2021, amid a national wave of book challenges and bans, a committee decided not to remove the book Gender Queer: A Memoir from school libraries. In 2024, the Salem Reporter said, "In the past year, books about LGBTQ+ people and people of color were hidden on far away shelves and thrown in the trash at multiple Salem libraries."

Southside Speakeasy is a gay bar in Salem. The bar has hosted queer line dancing.

== History ==
The first Pride event in Salem was held in 1978, with nine people in attendance. Attendance remained low for the early years due to fear of backlash; at this time, it was legal to fire employees for being gay in the state of Oregon, and community backlash to LGBTQ visibility was on the rise from the 1970s to 1990s. The first full Pride parade was held in 1995, and another was held the following year with 200 people in attendance. Attendance grew over the years, and in 2023, an estimated 8,000 people attended the city's pride celebration.

Rainbow Youth was established in 2001 to support Salem's LGBTQ youth. Youth Era was a "youth mental health drop-in center" that was supportive of LGBTQ youth and an important gathering place; the Salem chapter opened in 2018 and closed in February 2026.

In 2024, Salem's St. Paul's Episcopal Church held its first Pride Mass.

== Events ==
Salem hosts an annual Pride event called Pride in the Park, which is organized by Salem Capital Pride. Pro-LGBTQ demonstrations have been held at the Oregon State Capitol in Salem.

Salem Capital Pride organizes and supports a variety of regular LGBTQ community events, including a silent book club, community sports, video game and board game nights, bouldering, and yoga.

== Organizations ==
Salem has a chapter of the LGBTQ organization PFLAG. Youth Era's Salem Drop is a community space for people ages 14 to 25, including many LGBTQ people. Rainbow Youth offers a resources for LGBTQ youth, including a support group for LGBTQ and allied youth.

Chemeketa Community College, located in the Hayesville area in northeast Salem, has a LGBTQ2SIA+ club, and Willamette University has a gender resource and advocacy center that is available to students of any gender. Northwest Human Services has offices at their clinic in West Salem focused on "creating a healthy community with respect, compassion, and acceptance for all", according to the Statesman Journal. The clinic offers services related to hormone replacement therapy and transgender health care.
