= Eugene Pride =

Annual LGBTQ event in Eugene, Oregon, U.S.

- Logo

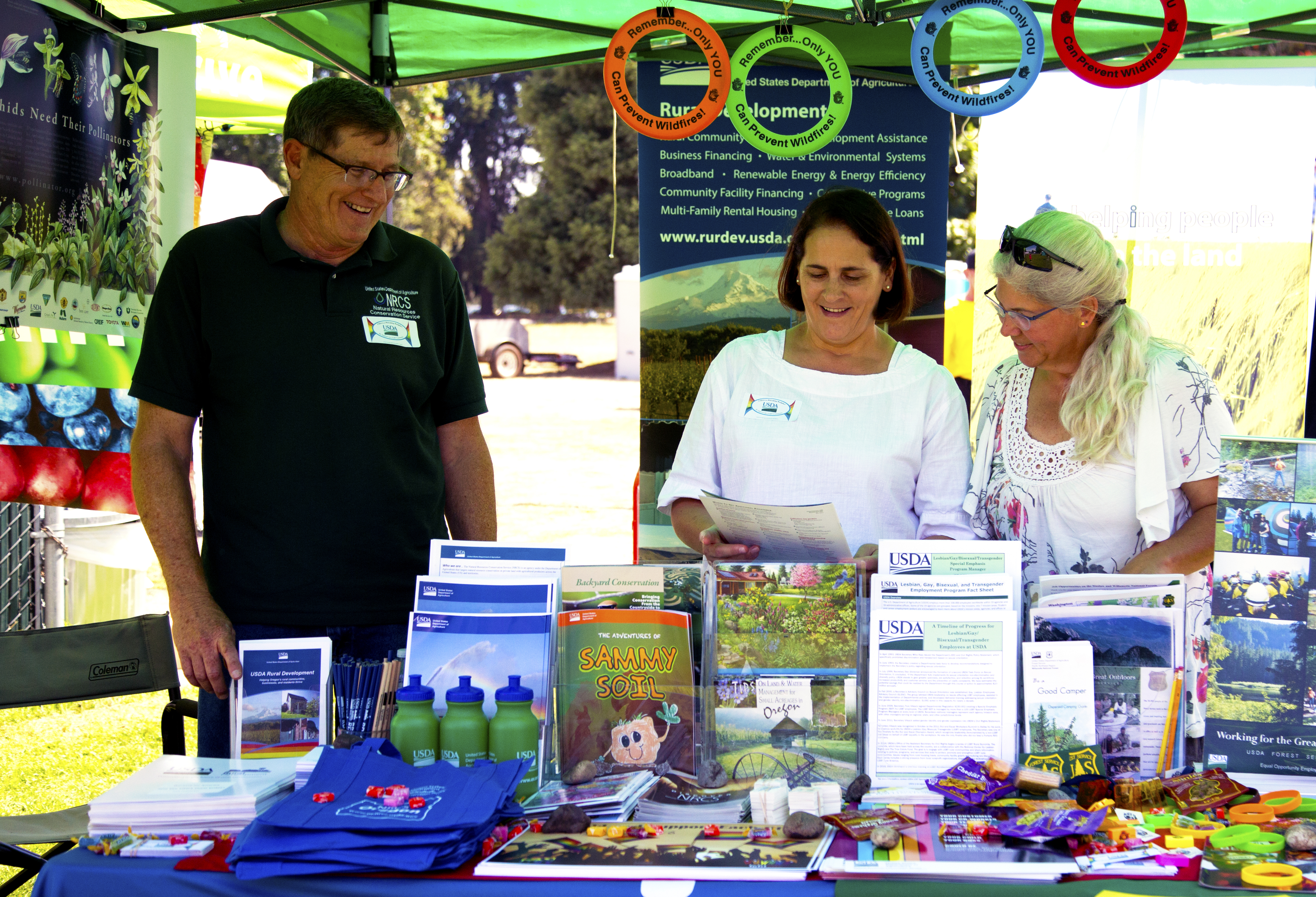
- U.S. Department of Agriculture (USDA) Rural Development (RD) Oregon State Director Vicki Walker staff the USDA booth at the Eugene/Springfield, OR Pride Festival along with representatives from the USDA Natural Resources Conservation Service (NRCS) and the U.S. Forest Service (USFS) on Aug. 13, 2016.
- Frequency: Annually
- Location: Eugene, Oregon
- Country: United States
- Website: eugenepride.org

Eugene Pride is an annual event held in June at the Lane Events Center in Eugene, Oregon, United States. It "Promotes Respect In Diverse Expression" (P.R.I.D.E.) for the LGBTQ community.

== History and activities ==
The festival began in 1991 and was organized several weeks after Pride Northwest, which takes place in Portland, Oregon.

Local queer groups take part in the event and welcome visitors, boosting the local economy. Numerous organizations and businesses are provided with the space to exhibit their work. Additionally, attendees have access to amenities such as a beer garden, a dedicated area for children, and a selection of various food choices. Free HIV testing is provided by HIV Alliance.

The festival was cancelled in 2020 due to COVID-19, but resumed in 2021. In 2026, the march and rally have been canceled, but the festival is still planned.

== See also ==
- LGBTQ culture in Eugene, Oregon
- List of LGBTQ events
