= 1977 in LGBTQ rights =

This is a list of notable events in the history of LGBT rights that took place in the year 1977.

== Events ==
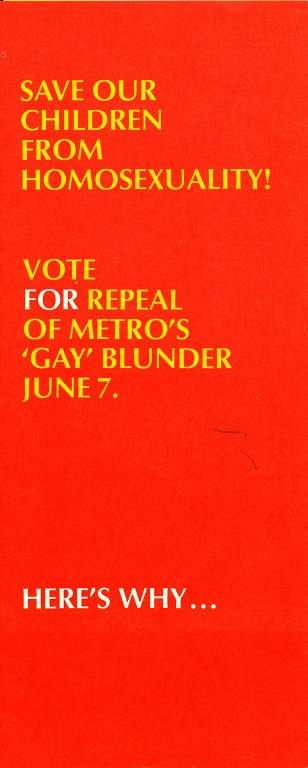
Save Our Children brochure

- The city of Washington, D.C., adopts a human rights code banning sexual orientation discrimination in private employment. This code replaces previous legislation such as Title 34, enacted in 1973 which also granted sexual orientation protection.
- Dade County, Florida, in the United States, enacts a Human Rights Ordinance providing that rights can not be abridged on the basis of sexuality.

=== February ===
- 7 — The city council of Tucson, Arizona, passes an ordinance prohibiting discrimination based on sexual orientation in employment, housing and public accommodation.

=== March ===
- 17 — Arkansas reinstates its sodomy law, two years after repealing it.

=== May ===
- 21 — 750 gays and lesbians and supporters in Minneapolis protest the appearance of Anita Bryant who had arrived to perform at the opening of a fruit warehouse.

=== June ===
- 7 — Save Our Children, a campaign founded by Anita Bryant, trading on fears of homosexual "recruitment" and child molestation, results in a repeal of Dade County, Florida's, Civil Rights Ordinance by a margin of 69% to 31%.
- 16 — In Houston, Texas, a protest demonstration of 6,000 gays, lesbians and supporters marches through downtown when Anita Bryant arrives to entertain at a banquet.

=== July ===
- 21 — In Ontario, a committee recommends that the Ontario Human Rights Code be amended to include sexual orientation.

=== August ===
- 16 — In a New York Supreme Court case, Richards vs. US Tennis ASSN, Renee Richards, a transgender woman, is allowed to play in the tennis tournament.

=== September ===
- 1 — The present-day Log Cabin Republicans organization is founded as the "Gay Republicans" club, a group of lesbians and gays within the United States' Republican Party.

=== October ===
- 7 — The Advocate, an LGBT themed magazine, celebrates its 10th anniversary in Washington, D.C.
- 14 — Minneapolis gay rights activist Thom Higgins throws a pie into the face of Anita Bryant during a news conference in Des Moines, Iowa.
- 15 — The school board of Santa Barbara, California, votes to ban discrimination against students based on sexual orientation.

=== November ===
- 2 — Senior Action in a Gay Environment, now known as Services & Advocacy for GLBT elders, is founded.
- 8 — Harvey Milk becomes the first openly gay man to be elected in a major U.S. city when he is elected to the San Francisco Board of Supervisors. The man who would assassinate Milk and city mayor George Moscone less than eleven months later—Dan White—is also elected to the Board of Supervisors on this day.
- 28 — Aspen, Colorado, passes a gay rights ordinance.

=== December ===
- 15 — Quebec becomes the first jurisdiction (larger than a city or county) in the world to prohibit discrimination based on sexual orientation. The Quebec Charter of Rights and Freedoms prohibits discrimination in employment, housing, certain services and other activities in the public and private sectors.

== See also ==
- Timeline of LGBT history — timeline of events from 12,000 BCE to present
- LGBT rights by country or territory — current legal status around the world
- LGBT social movements
