= 1973 in LGBTQ rights =

This is a list of notable events in the history of LGBT rights that took place in the year 1973.

== Events ==
=== January ===
- 1 – Maryland becomes the first state to ban same-sex civil marriages. It does so by passing a statue restricting marriage to heterosexual couples.
- 27 – The Metropolitan Community Church's headquarters in Los Angeles is burned to the ground by an unknown assailant. No persons are inside of the building at the time of the fire.

=== April ===
- 22 – The first gay protest in Santiago, Chile was organised at Plaza de Armas.

=== June ===
- 24 – The UpStairs Lounge arson attack in the French Quarter of New Orleans kills 32 members of a Metropolitan Community Church congregation meeting.

=== August ===
- Pride Week 1973, the first major LGBT pride event in Canada, is held simultaneously in several Canadian cities.

=== October ===
- 10 – Following a lobbying campaign by the Gay Alliance Toward Equality, Toronto City Council adopts a policy forbidding discrimination on the basis of sexual orientation in municipal hiring, making the city the first jurisdiction in Canada to do so.

=== November ===
- 5 – The Supreme Court of the United States in Wainwright v. Stone finds that the sodomy law of Florida is not unconstitutionally vague, reversing a Fifth Circuit ruling.
- 9 – The Kentucky Court of Appeals rules in Jones v. Callahan that two women were properly denied a marriage license despite the gender neutrality of the state's marriage statute.

=== December ===
- 13 – Washington, D.C.'s Title 34 makes discrimination on the basis of sexual orientation illegal.
- 15 – The board of the American Psychiatric Association votes 13–0 to remove homosexuality from its official list of psychiatric disorders, the DSM-II. The resolution also urges an end to private and public discrimination and the repeal of laws discriminating against homosexuals.
- 20 – The city council of New York City rejects a gay rights ordinance.
- 21 – A United States federal judge issues a bulletin stating that the federal civil service may not terminate an employee based on sexual orientation alone.

== See also ==
- Timeline of LGBT history – timeline of events from 12,000 BCE to present
- LGBT rights by country or territory – current legal status around the world
- LGBT social movements
