= 1976 in LGBTQ rights =

This is a list of notable events in the history of LGBT rights that took place in the year 1976.

== Events ==
=== January ===
- 1 — Iowa repeals its "sexual psychopath" law. Passed in the wake of a moral panic following the 1954 rape and murder of a young boy, the law had been used to detain dozens of gay men in mental institutions in the 1950s.

=== February ===
- 12 — The Pennsylvania Council for Sexual Minorities is formed by Governor Milton J. Shapp of Pennsylvania.
- 29 — New York City's public radio channel, WNET, airs a special titled "OUTREACH: LESBIANS AND GAY MEN".

=== May ===
- City council of Los Angeles prohibits employment discrimination by the city based on sexual orientation.

=== July ===
- 1 — U.S. state of Indiana decriminalizes private consensual adult homosexual acts.
- 19 — Homosexual activity becomes illegal, as does same-sex marriage, in Liberia.

=== September ===
- 4 — Start of the three-day "Fourth Annual Gay Conference for Canada and Quebec," held in Toronto, including a rally and march.

=== November ===
- 4 — A law on decriminalizing male homosexual acts goes into effect in Australian Capital Territory

== See also ==
- Timeline of LGBT history — timeline of events from 12,000 BCE to present
- LGBT rights by country or territory — current legal status around the world
- LGBT social movements
