= 1975 in LGBTQ rights =

This is a list of notable events in the history of LGBT rights that took place in the year 1975.

== Events ==
=== January ===
- 1 - California decriminalizes private consensual adult homosexual acts.
- 7 — A Maricopa County clerk issues a marriage license to a same-sex couple.

=== February ===
- The first gay-oriented television commercial airs on two Washington, D.C. stations. The Lambda Rising bookstore sponsored the ads on episodes of Phil Donahue and Marcus Welby, M.D.. Stations balked at airing the ads, but relented after getting approval from the Association of Broadcasters Standards office.
- 6 - John Damien, a racing steward at Woodbine Racetrack in Toronto, Ontario, Canada, is fired from his job for being gay, sparking a legal battle that eventually leads to the inclusion of sexual orientation in the Ontario Human Rights Code in 1986.

=== March ===
- 26 — Boulder County, Colorado clerk Clela Rorex begins issuing marriage licenses to same-sex couples. Colorado Attorney General J.D. MacFarlane later issues an opinion that the licenses are invalid and orders that no additional licenses be issued.

=== April ===
- Milton Shapp, governor of the U.S. state of Pennsylvania, issues the first state executive order banning sexual orientation employment discrimination by the government.

=== July ===
- 1 — The U.S. state of Washington decriminalizes private consensual adult homosexual acts.
- 3 — The United States Civil Service Commission ends its policy of automatically disqualifying gay and lesbian applicants.

== Deaths ==
- February 10 — Lige Clarke, LGBT rights activist and journalist. Murdered in Vera Cruz, Mexico.

== See also ==
- Timeline of LGBT history — timeline of events from 12,000 BCE to present
- LGBT rights by country or territory — current legal status around the world
- LGBT social movements
