= 2016 in LGBTQ rights =

This is a list of notable events in the history of LGBTQ rights that took place in the year 2016.

== Events ==
=== January ===
- 1 – Civil unions and step-child adoption by same-sex couples become legal in Estonia.
- 2 – Through her foundation, Jennifer Pritzker gives a $2 million donation to create the world’s first endowed academic chair of transgender studies, at the University of Victoria in British Columbia; Aaron Devor is chosen as the inaugural chair.
- 4 – Jackie Biskupski becomes the first openly gay Mayor of Salt Lake City, Utah.
- 18 – Montana Governor Steve Bullock issues an executive order prohibiting discrimination on the basis of gender identity in public employment.
- 20 – New York State Division of Human Rights §466.13 prohibiting harassment and discrimination on the basis of gender identity, transgender status, or gender dysphoria when it comes to public and private employment, loans, schools, and public accommodations go into effect in the state of New York.
- The Evangelical Church in the Rhineland votes to allow same-sex marriages in its churches.

=== February ===
- 2
  - The Lewisburg City Council unanimously passes Ordinance 254, an ordinance which banned sexual orientation and gender identity discrimination in public and private employment and public accommodations.
  - The Supreme Court of India decides to review criminalization of homosexuality under Section 377 of the IPC.
- 10 – Step-child and joint adoption by same-sex couples become legal in Portugal.
- 22 – The Charlotte City Council passes, by a 7–4 vote, an amendment with a non-discrimination ordinance prohibiting discrimination on the basis of sexual orientation or gender identity in public accommodations, passenger vehicle for hire, and city contractors. It took effect on 1 April.
- 25 – The Italian Senate approves a Civil Union bill in a 173–71 vote.

=== March ===
- 23 – North Carolina General Assembly passes the Public Facilities Privacy & Security Act. That same day, HB 2 is signed into law by Governor Pat McCrory.

=== April ===
- 1 – Same-sex marriage becomes legal in Greenland. The first same-sex couples were married on that day.
- 7 – The Constitutional Court of Colombia votes 6–3 in favor of legalizing same-sex marriage. The ruling had immediate effect and required civil notaries to marry any same-sex couples who sought to marry.
- - The Protestant Church in Baden votes to allow same-sex marriages in its churches.
- - The Evangelical Church in Berlin, Brandenburg and Silesian Upper Lusatia votes to allow blessing of same-sex marriages in its churches.

=== May ===
- 11 – The Chamber of Deputies of Italy approves the Civil Union bill in a 372–51 vote.
- 12
  - Same-sex sexual activity is decriminalized in Nauru.
  - Same-sex marriage becomes legal in the Mexican state of Jalisco following the Congress of Jalisco complying with the Mexican Supreme Court ruling by amending the state civil code.
- 17 – Same-sex sexual activity is officially decriminalized in Seychelles.
- 20 – Same-sex marriage becomes legal in the Mexican state of Campeche.
- 28 – The Conservative Party of Canada votes 1,036–462 to change the party's political platform from defining marriage as "a union between one man and one woman" to a neutral stance.

=== June ===
- 28 – Czech Constitutional Court struck down a ban which forbade people living in registered partnerships from adopting children as individuals. However, joint adoption and stepchild adoption still remain illegal.

=== July ===
- 1 – A bill banning the use of conversion therapy on the basis of sexual orientation and gender identity takes effect in the state of Vermont.
- 8 – A bill that prohibits discrimination based on gender identity in public accommodations in Massachusetts is signed into law by governor Charlie Baker.
- 16 – The General Synod of Anglican Church in Canada voted in favour of same-sex marriage.
- 22 – Same-sex marriage becomes legal in the United Kingdom Crown dependency of Isle of Man.

=== August ===
- 10 – Same-sex sexual activity is officially decriminalized by high court decision in Belize.
- 15 – Health Canada relaxed blood donation restrictions on men who have sex with men, reducing the deferral period from five years to one year.

=== September ===
- 1 – Northern Ireland lifts its lifetime ban on gay men donating blood, reducing the restriction to a one-year deferral period.

=== October ===
- 1 – A policy that lifts the ban on transgender troops from serving openly goes into effect in the United States.
- 13 – Same-sex marriage becomes legal in the British Overseas Territory of the British Antarctic Territory.

=== December ===
- 6 – A bill that bans sexual orientation and gender identity conversion therapy on minors is passed by the legislature of Malta.
- 14 – Pittsburgh becomes the first city in Pennsylvania to ban conversion therapy on minors after the city council passes a bill by a vote of 9-0.
- 15 – Same-sex marriage becomes legal in the British Overseas Territory of Gibraltar. The first same-sex marriage is performed the following day.
