= Kiara St. James =

African American transgender activist (1973/1973–2026)

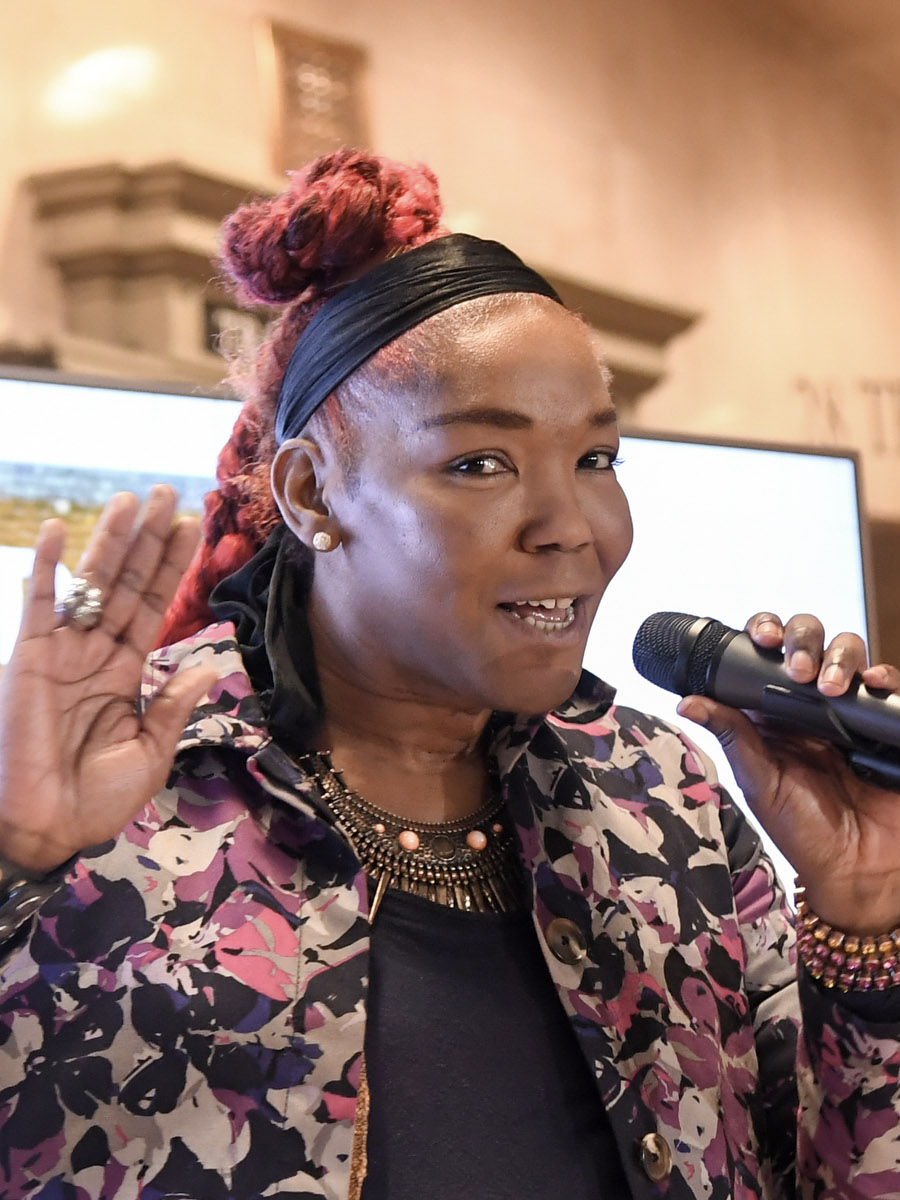
- St. James in 2020
- Born: 1973 or 1974; Beaumont, Texas, U.S.
- Died: May 8, 2026 (aged 51–52); Cleveland, Ohio, U.S.
- Organization: New York Transgender Advocacy Group
- Known for: Transgender and HIV advocacy

Kiara St. James (1973 or 1974 – May 8, 2026) was an African-American transgender activist. She was the co-founder and executive director of the New York Transgender Advocacy Group.

== Life and career ==
St. James was born in 1973 or 1974, and grew up in Beaumont, Texas. Her family was Christian fundamentalist, and she experienced condemnation and "a lot of gender policing" during her childhood when she wanted to play with girls instead of boys. After a schoolteacher noticed she frequently had bruises from being beaten, St. James was removed from her birth family and put into foster care in Heidelberg, Germany, where she lived from the age of 11 through high school graduation. Following graduation at the age of 17, St. James returned to the U.S. and made an attempt to reconnect with her birth family, but did not feel connected to them. She enrolled in business school and underwent job training as a security guard, then as a nurse assistant in San Marcos, Texas. During this time, she began to meet other queer and gender nonconforming folks.

In 1990, St. James moved to Atlanta with her then-partner, Kevin, and took on jobs in nursing and waiting tables. The pair moved to New York City in 1995, where she did odd jobs to help pay the bills. She began her gender transition after connecting with other trans women, who then referred to themselves as "femme queens". She also began to engage in sex work to make a living. In 1999, during a period of living at a homeless shelter on Ward's Island, St. James was invited to take a Housing Works bus to Washington, D.C., to join a rally for HIV funding. This trip inspired her to get further involved in activism, and she honed her skills in advocacy while working in the Housing Works donation warehouse in Queens.

She helped advocate for the successful passage of New York's Sexual Orientation Non-Discrimination Act (SONDA) in 2002 and co-founded the New York Transgender Advocacy Group (NYTAG) with "four other black and brown trans women" in 2014. The efforts of St. James and NYTAG, which became a nonprofit in 2015, were instrumental to the passage of New York's Gender Expression Non-Discrimination Act (GENDA). In 2020, City & State included St. James in the Pride Power 100 list of the most influential people in the New York City LGBTQ community. The following year, St. James succeeded in her work with other activists to end a New York City loitering law known as the "Walking While Trans" law, as trans women were disproportionately targeted.

Among her other roles, St. James served on the New York City Commission on Gender Equity, and the national advisory board for the Transgender Law Center's Positively Trans program. During Transgender Awareness Week in 2023, St. James was honored by the New York City Comptroller, Brad Lander.

St. James was open about having HIV. In 2022, she was diagnosed with anal cancer, and was hospitalized for months.

St. James died of cancer in Cleveland, Ohio, on May 8, 2026. New York governor Kathy Hochul was among those offering condolences, calling St. James "a champion for the LGBTQ+ community", and stating that she was "proud to know her and to fight alongside her".
