= 9 New York Code of Rules and Regulations Section 466.13 =

Anti-discrimination law in New York, US

9 New York Code of Rules and Regulations §466.13 is a regulation under the New York Human Rights Law (NYSHRL) that explicitly prohibits discrimination on the basis of gender identity or expression. This regulation was adopted to align with amendments to the Executive Law made by Chapter 8 of the Laws of New York in 2019, which added gender identity or expression as a protected class under state law. It applies to various areas, including employment, housing, public accommodations, and educational institutions. Governor Andrew Cuomo signed the legislation on January 25, 2019, at the Lesbian, Gay, Bisexual & Transgender Community Center in Manhattan's West Village. The law went into effect 30 days later on February 24, 2019.

== Background and purpose ==
The regulation was introduced to ensure compliance with the expanded protections under the NYSHRL following the enactment of the Gender Expression Non-Discrimination Act (GENDA) in 2019. GENDA formally recognized gender identity or expression as a protected characteristic, prohibiting discrimination against individuals based on their gender identity or how they express their gender. The Division of Human Rights (DHR) issued this regulation to clarify and enforce these protections across all covered areas.

== Key provisions ==
=== Employment ===
Employers are prohibited from discriminating against individuals in hiring, firing, compensation, or other terms and conditions of employment based on gender identity or expression. This includes respecting an individual's preferred name and pronouns and allowing access to facilities consistent with their gender identity.

=== Housing ===
Landlords and housing providers cannot deny individuals the right to rent, lease, or purchase property based on their gender identity or expression. They must also ensure equal terms and conditions in housing transactions.

=== Public accommodations ===
Businesses and public entities must provide equal access to services and facilities without discrimination. For example, individuals cannot be denied access to restrooms or programs that align with their gender identity.

=== Education ===
Schools are required to prevent harassment and discrimination against students based on their gender identity or expression. This includes ensuring access to facilities and programs consistent with their gender identity.

=== Reasonable accommodations ===
The regulation also emphasizes reasonable accommodations for individuals with disabilities related to gender dysphoria, as long as such accommodations meet legal standards and are supported by medical documentation.

== See also ==
- LGBT rights in New York
- New York State Division of Human Rights
