= Walking While Trans =

Repealed New York State law

Section 240.37 of the New York State Penal Law (also known by the sardonic nickname "Walking While Trans"), formally titled loitering for the purpose of engaging in a prostitution offense was a law, first introduced in 1976, intended to prevent loitering for the purpose of prostitution. The notoriously vague legislation was repealed in 2021 after years of criticism from politicians and LGBTQ advocates that it facilitated discrimination against law-abiding transgender people.

== Statute and effects ==
The text of the statute defined "public places", such as streets, alleys, and building entrances, as places where stopping or conversing with passers-by for the purpose of advertising, patronizing, or promoting prostitution, was punishable as a Class B misdemeanor. The language was so overly broad that it allowed the police to profile people based on their appearance to determine that a person was engaging in prostitution. One police officer testified that he was trained to look for "women with Adam's apples, big hands, and big feet" when identifying people in prostitution.

In 2016, The Legal Aid Society sued New York City on behalf of women of color who had fallen victim of the law, many of whom were transgender; both parties settled three years later. The city's police department revised its patrol guide in 2018 following a 120% increase in arrests; of the 152 people arrested that year, 80 percent were women, 49 percent were Black, and 42 percent were Latin Americans. A 2019 bill that was sponsored by Brad Hoylman-Sigal and Amy Paulin and would have repealed the law failed in the Senate Codes Committee. Around this time, many local district attorneys had stopped enforcing the law on the grounds that it was discriminatory, starting with Eric Gonzalez. In February 2020, the New York City Bar Association declared that it would welcome the repeal of the law. Activists had called for the law to be repealed for many years by mid-2020, when support gained mainstream recognition due to the Black Lives Matter protests in New York City.

== Repeal ==
On February 2, 2021, the law was repealed by a bill sponsored by Hoylman-Sigal that cited police reports claiming the law was used to stop people for "wearing a skirt", "waving at a car", and "standing somewhere other than a bus stop or taxi stand". The bill repealing the law was passed by the state senate 45–16 and the Assembly 105–44, then signed into law by New York Governor Andrew Cuomo. Previous efforts at getting the bill passed had been stymied as they lacked the support of Andrea Stewart-Cousins and Carl Heastie, the state legislators who had the power to move it to the floor for voting. Following its repeal, Gonzalez announced that his office would vacate his borough's warrants for the law and its underlying charges, starting with 262 warrants from 2012.

== See also ==
- Driving while black
- LGBTQ history in New York
- LGBTQ rights in New York
- Racial profiling
- Transphobia in the United States
- Transgender sex workers
- Vagueness doctrine
