= LGBTQ rights in New York =

LGBTQ rights in New York State
- New York (US)
- Legal status: Legal since 1980
- Gender identity: Sex reassignment surgery not a requirement for changing birth certificates
- Discrimination protections: Sexual orientation and gender identity or expression protections (see below)

Family rights
- Recognition of relationships: Same-sex marriage since 2011
- Adoption: Yes

The U.S. state of New York has generally been seen as socially liberal in regard to lesbian, gay, bisexual, transgender and queer (LGBTQ) rights. LGBTQ travel guide Queer in the World states, "The fabulosity of Gay New York is unrivaled on Earth, and queer culture seeps into every corner of its five boroughs". The advocacy movement for LGBTQ rights in the state has been dated as far back as 1969 during the Stonewall riots in New York City. Same-sex sexual activity between consenting adults has been legal since the New York v. Onofre case in 1980. Same-sex marriage has been legal statewide since 2011 and some cities have recognized domestic partnerships between same-sex couples since 1998. Discrimination protections in credit, housing, employment, education, and public accommodation have explicitly included sexual orientation since 2003 and gender identity or expression since 2019. Transgender people in the state legally do not have to undergo sex reassignment surgery to change their sex or gender on official documents since 2014. In addition, both conversion therapy on minors and the gay and trans panic defense have been banned since 2019. Since 2021, commercial surrogacy has been legally available within New York State. In 2024, the Constitution of New York was amended to explicitly ban discrimination on the basis of gender identity and sexual orientation following a successful ballot measure.

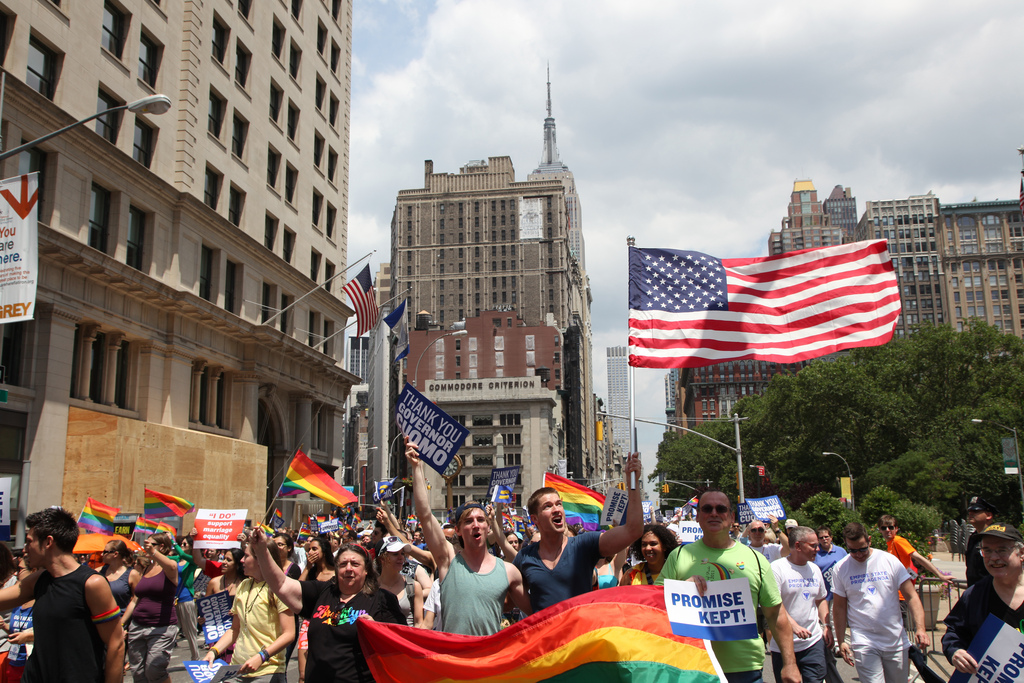
The 2011 edition of the NYC Pride March

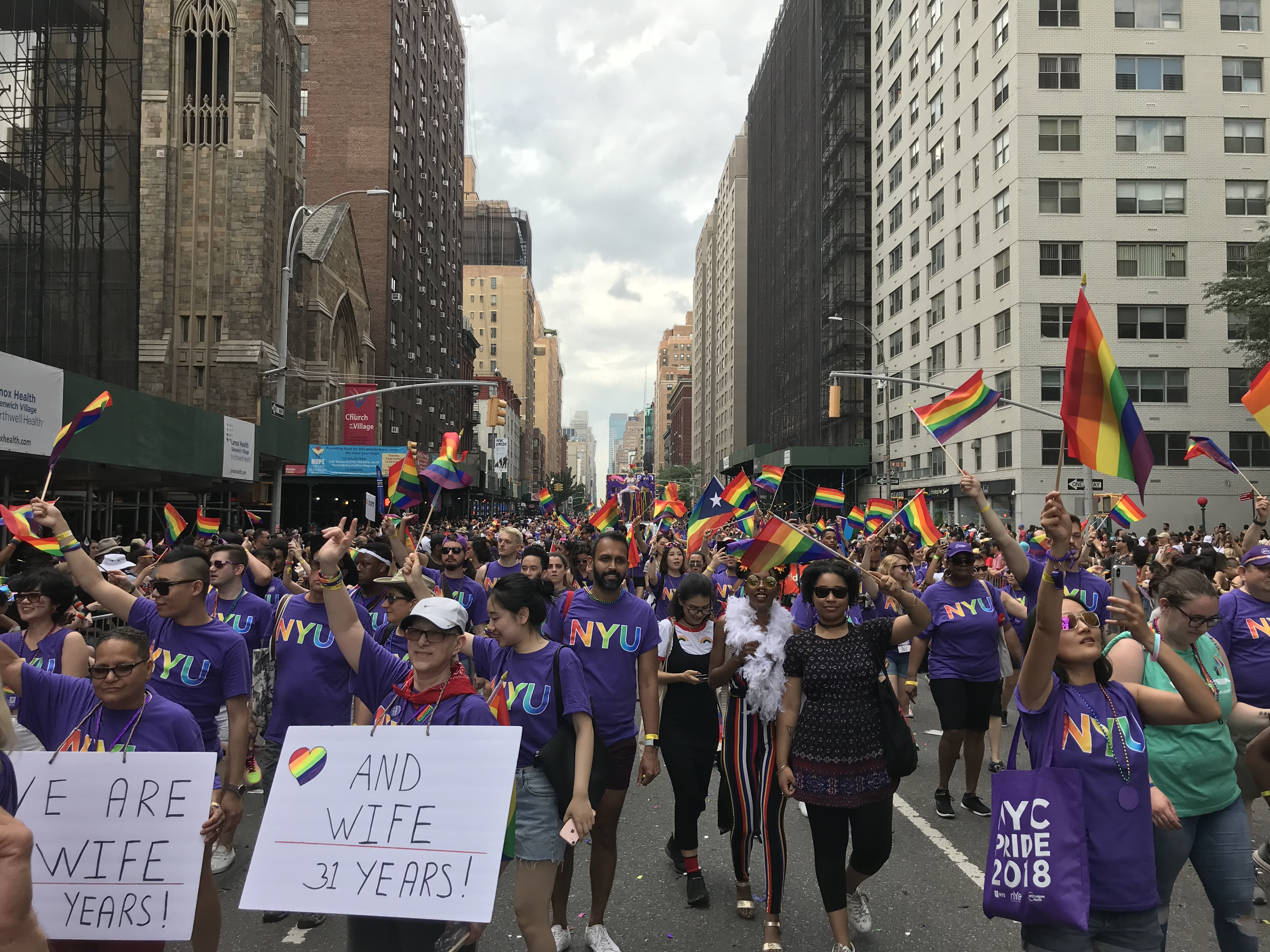
Participants at the 2018 NYC Pride March

On June 28, 1969, LGBTQ people rioted following a police raid on the Stonewall Inn. The Stonewall riots and further protests over the following nights were a watershed moment in the history of LGBTQ rights, and the beginning of the modern LGBTQ rights movement. New York City is now regarded as one of the most LGBTQ-friendly cities in the world. At Stonewall 50 – WorldPride NYC 2019, tens of thousands of people marched in the NYC Pride March, with about 5 million people in attendance, constituting the world's largest LGBTQ event in history. In April 2022 following the enactment of the Florida Parental Rights in Education Act, New York City Mayor Eric Adams announced a digital billboard campaign to attract Floridians to a significantly more supportive environment for LGBTQ residents in New York City.

== Recognition of same-sex relationships ==
=== Legality of same-sex sexual activity ===
All existing laws against private consenting homosexual sexual conduct between adults were abolished by the New York Court of Appeals in the 1980 case New York v. Onofre, with the exception of laws affecting employees of the New York National Guard. A law repealing the defunct sodomy provisions took effect in 2000. Adultery until November 2024 was a "criminal offense and felony" in New York, and applies equally to all married couples (including within a same-sex marriage). That law has since been repealed. In November 2019, Governor Andrew Cuomo signed a bill into law granting military service members who received dishonorable discharges, under the federal Don't ask, don't tell policy from 1993 to 2011, access to state veterans’ benefits.

=== Same-sex marriage ===
New York has provided benefits to same-sex partners of state employees since 1995. In 1998, Mayor Rudy Giuliani signed a law establishing and recognizing domestic partnerships in New York City. In 2006 the New York Court of Appeals determined that the state constitution did not guarantee same-sex marriage; attempts to pass marriage equality measures failed in 2007 and 2009. In May 2008, Governor David Paterson issued an executive directive for all state agencies to recognize same-sex marriages performed in other jurisdictions. On June 24, 2011, the New York State Legislature passed and the Governor signed the Marriage Equality Act allowing same-sex marriages to be performed in New York State. The law took effect on July 24, 2011.

=== Adoption and parenting ===
In 1982, New York became the first state to create a policy of non-discrimination in adoption for individual gay and lesbian applicants, which stated, “Applicants shall not be rejected solely on the basis of homosexuality.” However, social workers and agencies could still weigh sexual orientation as a factor. In 1995, the state court of appeals ruled in Matter of Jacob and Matter of Dana that second-parent adoptions within unmarried couples were protected regardless of sexual orientation; in 2004, a court in In re Adoption of Carolyn B. ruled in favor of joint adoption by same-sex couples. In October 2020, a New York State district court order ruled that adoption organizations could turn away gay, single, and unmarried heterosexual couples due to a "religious affiliation and beliefs" under the US First Amendment and Fourteenth Amendment in a lawsuit supported by the Alliance Defending Freedom.

==== In vitro fertilisation and surrogacy ====
Surrogacy was banned in New York from 1992 to 2020, when the state legislature and Governor legalized the practice; the new law went into effect February 2021. In February 2021, it was announced by Governor Andrew Cuomo that insurance policy coverage must cover same-sex couples for IVF, surrogacy and/or other fertility treatments. In April 2022, a male same-sex couple within New York City commenced a lawsuit against their health insurance - to explicitly include IVF treatment costs and coverage for all individuals and couples, regardless of sexual orientation and gender. Currently within New York City health insurance providers provides only heterosexual and female same-sex couples are costs covered and reimbursed - but not for male gay couples who have to pay the "full pocket cost amounts" with no coverage and reimbursement whatsoever, amounting to an indirect "gay tax".

== Discrimination protections ==
In 2003, New York's Sexual Orientation Non-Discrimination Act (SONDA) took effect. SONDA "prohibits discrimination on the basis of actual or perceived sexual orientation in employment, housing, public accommodations, education, credit, and the exercise of civil rights." The 2003 law also explicitly includes "asexuality", a first for the United States. The Gender Expression Non-Discrimination Act (GENDA), which would extend protections to gender identity and expression, was introduced the same year but failed. On December 16, 2009, Governor David Paterson issued an executive order banning discrimination based on gender identity in state employment. Courts had ruled that transgender individuals can pursue anti-discrimination claims under the category of "sex". Between 2008 and 2019, GENDA was introduced and passed the state assembly annually. In 2019, it passed the Senate for the first time, was signed into law by Governor Cuomo in January, and went into effect in February.

Previously, in the absence of a statewide law, the counties of Suffolk, Tompkins, and Westchester, along with the cities of New York, Albany, Binghamton, Buffalo, Ithaca, Syracuse and Rochester passed non-discrimination ordinances protecting gender identity. In addition, on October 22, 2015, Governor Andrew Cuomo announced that he would direct the New York State Division of Human Rights (DHR) to promulgate regulations banning harassment and discrimination against transgender individuals in employment, housing, education, access to credit, and public accommodations. The DHR issued the regulations on November 4, 2015, and they went into effect on January 20, 2016.

Moreover, the state's anti-bullying law prohibits bullying on the basis of race, color, weight, national origin, ethnic group, religion or religious practice, disability, sexual orientation, gender (includes gender identity and expression) or sex. The law also explicitly includes cyberbullying and harassment, and applies to all public elementary and secondary schools in the state. On July 31, 2019, a new law implemented removed a loophole that did not legally protect students on discrimination, human rights and bullying within New York State.

=== Gay and trans panic defense ===
In June 2019, the New York State Legislature passed a bill to repeal the common law gay and transgender panic defense. The bill was signed into law by Governor Andrew Cuomo, effective immediately. New York State became the 6th US state to abolish it.

=== Hate crime law ===
The Hate Crimes Act of 2000 has covered sexual orientation since July 1, 2001, and gender identity and expression since November 1, 2019. In November 2022, New York Governor Kathy Hochul signed a pair of anti-bias bills - to reform comprehensive hate crime legislation and repeal loopholes. This is believed to be the toughest hate crime legislation ever passed within the United States.

=== LGBT seniors benefits and recognition ===
In October 2022, a bill was signed into law that would legally recognize LGBT seniors within New York State, and provide benefits.

=== Plastic surgery hospital case ===
In August 2020, it was reported by Gay City News that a doctor was fined tens of thousands of dollars by a New York Manhattan court judge for denying plastic surgery to three men that he believed to be HIV-positive. This court case could potentially be appealed.

=== Drug treatment and addiction programs ===
In June 2023, a bill passed unanimously within both houses of the New York State Legislature to explicitly include sexual orientation and gender identity - within inclusive drug treatment and addiction programs. Several times over the years, gay men particularly have been denied drug treatment and addiction programs within New York State. Governor Kathy Hochul signed the bill into law.

== Gender identity and expression ==
=== Safe haven laws ===
On June 12, 2023, New York City Mayor Eric Adams signed an executive order to "protect access to transgender care for people by preventing the use of city resources to detain, prosecute or investigate any individual who is providing or receiving gender-affirming health care services". On June 25, Governor Kathy Hochul signed a bill into law that prohibits state courts from enforcing laws of other states that allow custody to be taken away for providing youth with gender-affirming care, prohibits considering gender-affirming care for minors child abuse, and prohibits law enforcement from cooperating with out-of-state agencies regarding the legal provision of such care in the state. This made New York the 12th state to implement such "shield"/"safe haven" laws. In September 2023, Ithaca became the first town within New York State to "protect, defend and shield" transgender rights zoning - by a local ordinance override in case the state shield law changes.

In April 2025, the New York City Council approved several bills to expanding protections for gender-affirming care and providers in the wake of Trump's executive order attempting to curb access to care.

=== Documentation ===
Since 2014, transgender adults have been able to change their gender on their birth certificate with a notarized affidavit from a medical expert verifying gender confirmation surgery or a diagnosis of gender dysphoria. In January 2020, a 14-year-old transgender boy sued the state for the right to change his birth certificate; two months later attorney general of New York, Letitia James, updated the birth certificate policy to allow individuals born within New York State to change their gender on their birth certificates by "self affirmation" if 17 or older and with parental consent if younger.

In September 2018, the New York City Council passed by a vote of 41–6 an ordinance to allow a third gender option, "X", on birth certificates. Mayor Bill De Blasio signed the ordinance into law on October 10, 2018, and it went into effect on January 1, 2019. From January 2, 2020, New York City has also included the "gender X" option on death certificates. In November 2019, it was reported that state court and jury documents will contain a "gender X" option. In August 2020, the state began to include a gender X option in healthcare data.

In June 2021, the state passed the Gender Recognition Act, which allowed the use of "X" as a gender marker on drivers licenses and made it easier to seal records of name and gender changes on official documents (previously, transgender people were required to announce their new and previous names, current address, and date and place of birth in a designated newspaper). In November, Governor Kathy Hochul, signed a bill into law requiring utility companies and municipalities use their customers' preferred name and pronouns; The law went into effect on January 1, 2022, and is believed to be the first of its kind in the United States.

In April 2022, changes were approved in the state budget to include "X" identity markers on all state forms in 2023, with some organizations given until 2024 to implement the change, and to allow people to update name and gender designations on marriage certificates.

=== Walking while trans law ===
In 1976, New York State implemented an anti-prostitution law (also colloquially known as the "walking while trans law" or penal law section 240.37). In February 2021, the New York State Legislature (New York Senate vote 45-16 and New York House of Representatives vote 105–44) passed a bill to repeal the "walking while trans" law. New York State Governor Andrew Cuomo signed it into law - effective immediately. This archaic loitering law, Section 240.37 of the New York State Penal Code, had been used by police officers to harass and arrest transgender individuals since its 1976 inception.

=== New York City intersex education ===
In April 2021, the New York City Council passed a bill 45–2, to implement education programs about intersex individuals. With the backing of NYC intersex advocates, the city plans to provide educational resources on the medical procedures imposed on intersex youth in an effort to fit their anatomy into the male and female binary.

=== Gender-neutral bathrooms ===
In November 2020, a bill – passed the New York State Legislature and then signed into law by New York Governor Andrew Cuomo a month later – implemented gender-neutral bathrooms within New York State. The bathroom law within New York State went into effect on March 23, 2021 (90 days after the New York governor's signature).

=== Sports ===
Nassau County is the only county in the State to ban transgender athletes from women’s sports on county-run facilities. The New York Civil Liberties Union filed a lawsuit in favour of inclusion. In 2025, a state judge ruled there was no clear violation of New York's anti-discrimination laws based on gender identity. However, in November 2026, this decision was overturned.

== Conversion therapy ==
Beginning in 2003, bills pertaining to conversion therapy had passed the state Assembly 11 times. State senator Brad Hoylman, the only gay member of the senate and Assemblywoman Deborah J. Glick, New York's first openly gay legislator, introduced a bill to ban the practice in 2013. The bill passed the Assembly but died in the Senate. Hoylman attempted to pass the bill again for years but was repeatedly turned down in the Senate.

On June 16, 2014, the New York State Assembly voted 86–28 to pass a bill that would have prohibited health care providers from attempting to change the sexual orientation and/or gender identity of minors. However, the bill subsequently got blocked in the New York State Senate. In April 2015, the Assembly voted 111–12 to pass a bipartisan bill banning the practice and in April 2018 passed it again 116–19. Both times it died without a vote in the senate.

On February 6, 2016, New York Governor Andrew Cuomo announced regulations that ban public and private healthcare insurers from covering the practice and prohibit mental health facilities across the state from performing it. The regulations went into effect on April 27. The Human Rights Campaign celebrated this as the first time a governor had banned the practice using an executive action.

On January 15, 2019, Bill A576, which banned the practice of conversion therapy on minors, passed the state Assembly by a vote of 141–7 and the state Senate 57–4. The bill was signed into law by Governor Andrew Cuomo and took effect on January 25, 2019.

=== Local bans ===
Prior to statewide prohibition, the following jurisdictions had enacted conversion therapy bans:

- Albany
- Albany County
- Erie County
- New York City (now repealed)
- Rochester
- Ulster County
- Westchester County

== Living conditions ==
New York has one of the largest LGBTQ populations in the United States, and the world. Brian Silverman, the author of Frommer's New York City from $90 a Day, wrote that New York City has "one of the world's largest, loudest, and most powerful LGBT communities", and "gay and lesbian culture is as much a part of New York's basic identity as yellow cabs, high-rises, and Broadway theater". As of 2005, New York City was home to an estimated 272,493 self-identifying gay and bisexual individuals. The New York City metropolitan area had an estimated 568,903 self-identifying LGB residents. Meanwhile, New York City is also home to the largest transgender population in the United States, estimated at 50,000 in 2018, concentrated in Manhattan and Queens. Albany, the state capital, is also home to a large LGBTQ population, as are the cities of Buffalo, Rochester, Yonkers and Syracuse. Each host a variety of LGBTQ events, bars, cafés, organizations and centers. Fire Island Pines and Cherry Grove are famous internationally as gay holiday resorts with a thriving LGBTQ scene.

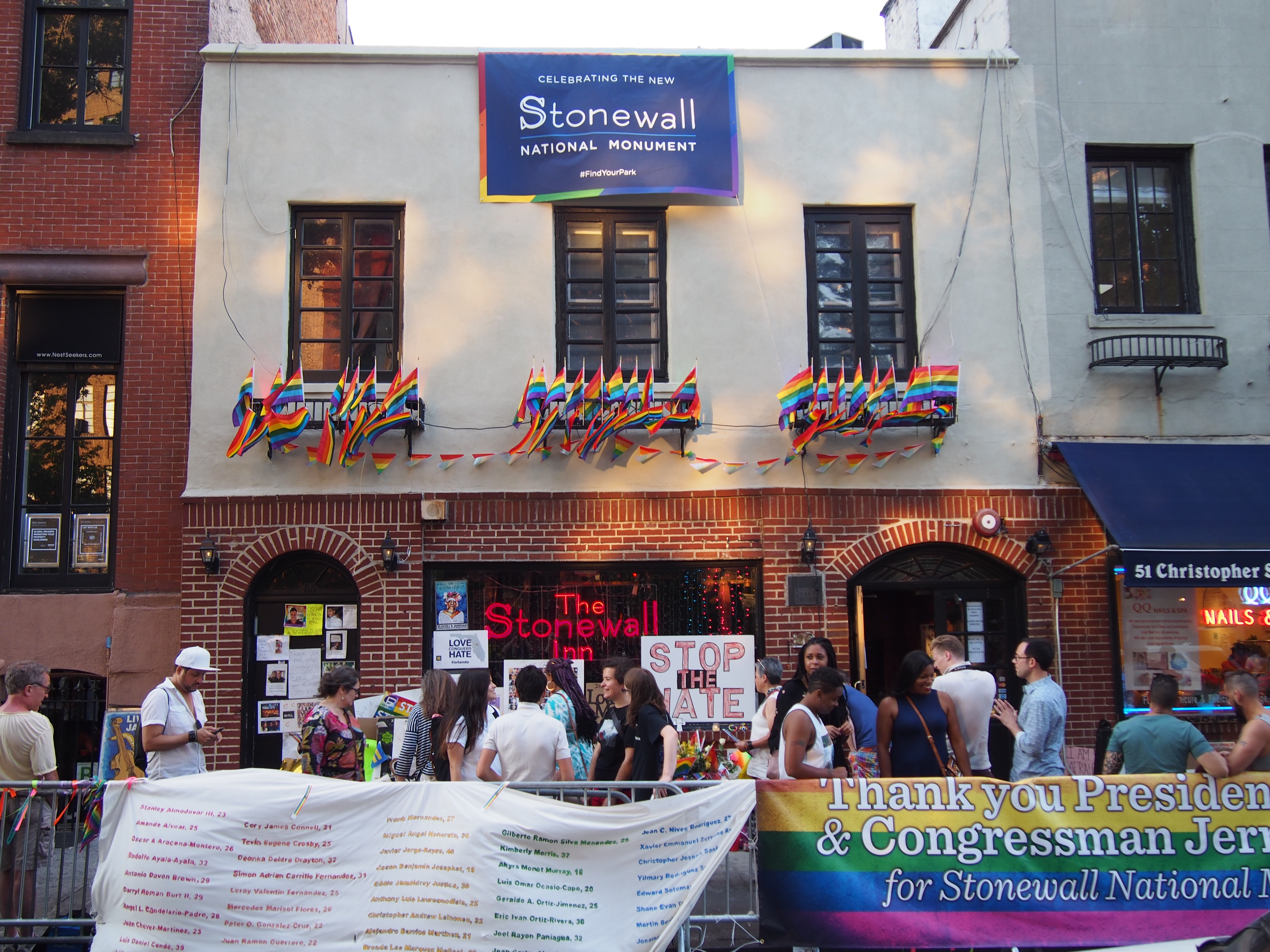
The Stonewall Inn in Greenwich Village, Manhattan, site of the June 1969 Stonewall riots, is adorned with flags depicting the colors of the rainbow.

New York State possesses a long history of presence of LGBTQ people, and has generally been seen as socially liberal in regard to LGBTQ rights. However, New York also has an older history of LGBTQ individuals often being convicted in the state. Sexual relations between persons of the same gender (variously described as "sodomy", "buggery" or "sins of carnal nature") were illegal for most of the history of New York from its establishment as a Dutch colony onwards, until such relations were legalized by judicial action in 1980. Activism for the rights of LGBTQ people in the state began with the rise of protest actions by the first "homophile" organizations in the 1950s and 1960s, although LGBTQ activism was propelled into a watershed moment in the 1969 Stonewall riots in Lower Manhattan and the later protests against the apathy of civil and political institutions to the HIV/AIDS crisis. Various organizations were established for LGBTQ people to advocate for rights and provide human services, the impact of which was increasingly felt at the state level. Over the following years, LGBTQ people gained more and more visibility, and discussions surrounding LGBTQ rights became increasingly more prominent and mainstream. In 1980, the New York Supreme Court legalized private consensual same-sex sexual activity, a historic and landmark decision. Simultaneously with legal reforms ongoing in the state, societal and public attitudes toward the LGBTQ community also evolved, going from general antipathy and hostility to tolerance and acceptance. In the early 21st century, anti-discrimination laws were modified to cover sexual orientation (in 2003) and gender identity (in 2019), a conversion therapy ban was enacted, gender transition laws were relaxed (removing the requirement for surgery amongst others), and hate crime legislation was passed. In 2011, the New York State Legislature passed the Marriage Equality Act, legalizing same-sex marriage in the state. New York became the sixth state in the US to legalize it, after Massachusetts, Connecticut, Iowa, Vermont, and New Hampshire.

In June 2019, in celebration of LGBTQ Pride Month, Governor Andrew Cuomo ordered that the LGBT pride flag be raised over the New York State Capitol for the first time in New York history. The New York Police Department also apologised for the 1969 Stonewall riots, exactly 50 years later.

== LGBTQ business city agreements ==
In January 2021, it was announced and reported that New York City recognizes LGBTQ-owned businesses access to city contract agreements - very similar arrangements in California and some cities within New Jersey exist by legislation or executive order.

== Defamation ==
On May 30, 2012, in the case of Yonaty v. Mincolla, a unanimous four-judge panel of the New York Appellate Division held that labeling someone "gay" or a "homosexual" can no longer be grounds for defamation. Justice Thomas Mercure wrote: "In light of the tremendous evolution in social attitudes regarding homosexuality...it cannot be said that current public opinion supports a rule that would equate statements imputing homosexuality with accusations of serious criminal conduct or insinuations that an individual has a loathsome disease."

== St Patrick's Day march bans ==
The ban on LGBTQ individuals participating in the New York City St. Patrick's Day parade was ended in September 2014.

The ban on LGBTQ individuals participating in the Staten Island St. Patrick's Day parade was ended in November 2024. This was the last St. Patrick's Day march in New York City to have such a ban in place.

== Gay bathhouse and sauna ban ==
In response to the AIDS crisis in New York, in 1985, the state government passed legislation that prohibited gay bathhouses and saunas. The legislation enabled municipalities to close gay bathhouses and other places where "high-risk sexual activities" take place. Mayor Ed Koch used the legislation to send the officials undercover into bathhouses.

As of August 2026, the ban remains in effect.

== Judges and justice systems annual statistics ==
In November 2020, a bill was signed into law by New York State Governor Andrew Cuomo that legally requires annual statistics on judges in courtrooms and New York State justice systems - based on gender, gender identity, sexual orientation, religion, race, color, disability, etc.

== Public opinion ==
A 2017 Public Religion Research Institute poll found that 69% of New York residents supported same-sex marriage, while 24% were opposed and 7% were unsure. Additionally, 75% supported discrimination protections covering sexual orientation and gender identity. 19% were opposed.

A 2022 Public Religion Research Institute poll found that 75% of New York residents supported same-sex marriage, while 21% were opposed and 3% were unsure. Additionally, 82% supported discrimination protections covering sexual orientation and gender identity. 14% were opposed.

== Summary table ==
Same-sex sexual activity legal with an equal age of consent (17)	Yes (Since 1980; codified in 2000)
Both anti-discrimination and hate crime laws implemented; sexual orientation and gender identity protections explicitly included in state constitution	Yes (Since 2024)
Prevention of attempted book bans implemented	Yes
Transgender persons in prisons, jails, juvenile detentions, etc. required to be housed according to their gender identity and coverage of transition healthcare	Yes
Gender confirmation surgery, puberty blockers, hormone replacement therapy and other transition-related healthcare for transgender people required to be covered under health insurance and state Medicaid policies	Yes
Transgender people allowed to participate in the sport of their gender identity	Yes (Since 2026)
Same-sex marriages implemented and codified - plus domestic partnership recognition option available	Yes (Since 2011)
Allowed to serve openly in the military, plus benefits and allowances	No (Federal ban for transgender people since 2025)
LGBT anti-bullying law in schools and colleges; LBGT education programs mandated by state law	Yes
Intersex minors protected from invasive surgical procedures	Yes (Since 2021)
IVF, foster parenting, adoption and surrogacy access without impediment and barriers	Yes
Automatic parenthood on birth certificates for children of same-sex couples, gender self-determination - plus a third X option for individuals without impediment and barriers	Yes (Since 2020)
Legal recognition of non-binary gender	Yes (Since 2021)
Gay and trans panic defense banned	Yes (Since 2019)
Conversion therapy banned on children and minors	Yes (Since 2019)
Conjugal visits for same-sex couples	Yes
Homosexuality declassified as a mental illness	Yes (Since 1973)
Transgender identity declassified as a mental illness	No (Reclassified as "gender dysphoria" under DSM-5 since 2013, and diagnosis of gender dysphoria is usually required in order to access transition care)
MSMs allowed to donate blood	Yes (Since 2023, with conditions under federal FDA policy - such as being monogamous)

== See also ==
- Empire State Pride Agenda
- Law of New York
- LGBT culture in New York City
- LGBT history in New York
- List of LGBT people from New York City
- New York Human Rights Law
- NYC Pride March
- Same-sex marriage in New York
- Stonewall riots
