= Transgender sex workers =

Transgender people who work in the sex industry

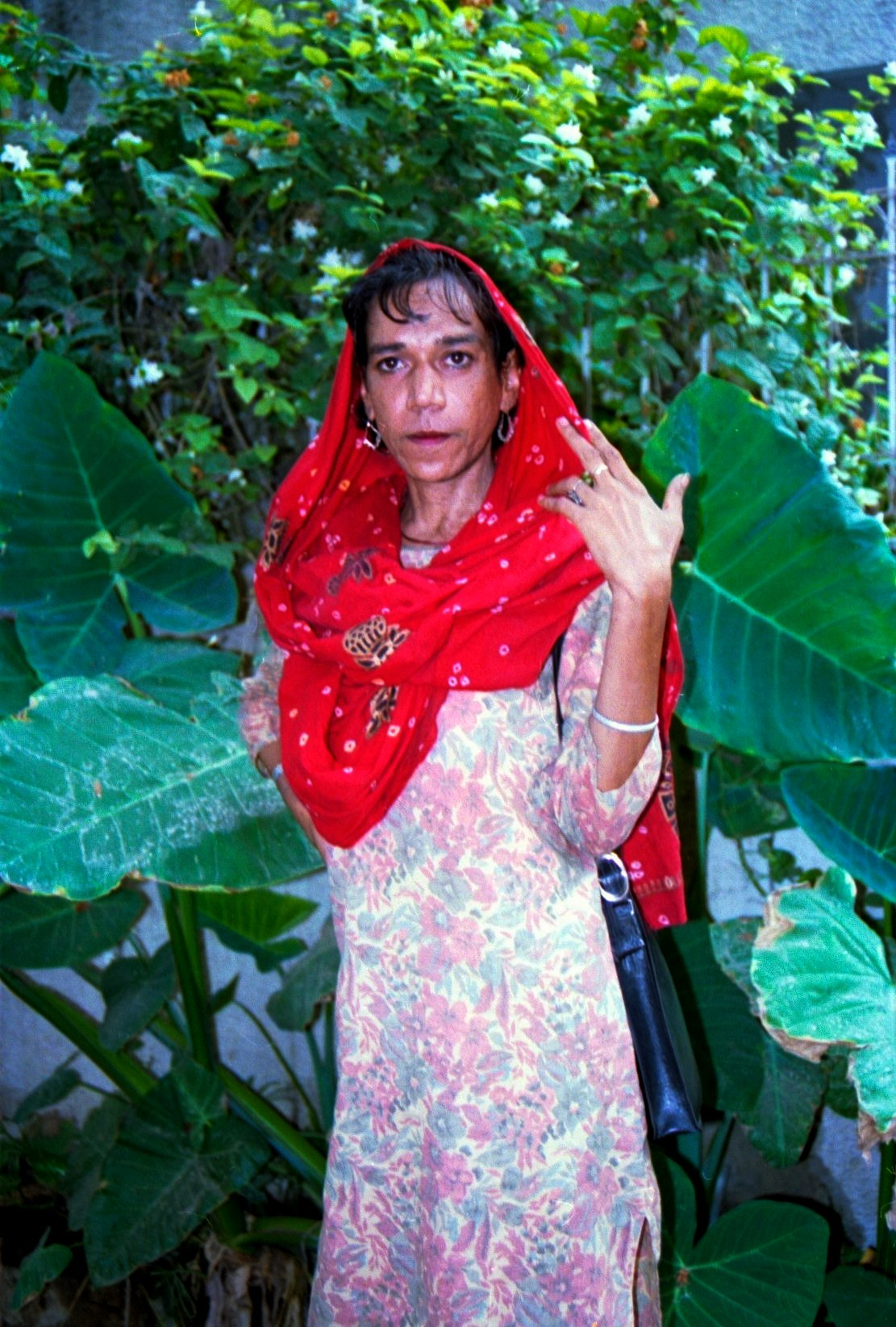
A hijra sex worker

Transgender sex workers are transgender people who work in the sex industry or perform sexual services in exchange for money or other forms of payment. In general, sex workers appear to be at great risk for serious health problems related to their profession, such as physical and sexual assault, robbery, murder, physical and mental health problems, and drug and alcohol addiction. Though all sex workers are at risk for the problems listed, some studies suggest that sex workers who engage in street-based work have a higher risk for experiencing these issues. Transgender sex workers experience high degrees of discrimination both in and outside of the sex industry and face higher rates of contracting HIV and experiencing violence as a result of their work.

== Overview ==
Roughly 13 percent of the transgender community in the USA reports having participated in the sex industry, according to data from the National Transgender Discrimination Survey. Transgender women and other transfeminine individuals are twice as likely to participate in the sex trade than transmasculine people, with lifetime participation of transgender women ranging from 24% to 75% across international studies. Other statistics such as lack of family support, job loss due to being transgender, and homelessness were higher among transgender people who had participated in the sex trade compared to those who had not.

HIV and other STI rates among transgender sex workers are much higher than those found in transgender non-sex workers. 15.3 percent of those who had done work in the sex industry reported being HIV-positive, whereas only 1.2 percent of non-sex workers reported being HIV-positive. Various groups have been created for the purpose of reducing HIV and STI rates among transgender sex workers. These groups focus on providing resources that transgender people are often unable to access like education, shower facilities, and job placement programs.

== Causes and effects ==
=== Poverty ===
Poverty works both as a cause and an effect of sex work. Sex workers as a whole are a vulnerable population due to obstacles like poverty, poor health, and legal and social barriers. A study that collected information on sex work from transgender women of color in San Francisco reported that for some transgender women sex work is a necessary means of survival. For these women, sex work is a way to get food, shelter, or income in a society that precludes them from many other lines of work.

Despite engaging in higher risk activity, transgender sex workers are more likely to receive lower pay than other sex workers. Transgender sex workers with history of homelessness, unemployment, incarceration, mental health issues, violence, emotional, physical, or sexual abuse, or drug use are further at risk of being trapped in a cycle of poverty. Lack of economic opportunities outside of the sex work industry and discrimination may lead to transgender people entering sex work in order to generate income for rent, drugs, medicines, hormones, or gender-related surgeries.

=== Unemployment ===
In the United States, there are no explicit legal protections on a federal level for transgender workers based on gender identity or expression. This lack of legal protection places transgender workers in a position to have higher rates of unemployment and greater risk of poverty.

Unemployment rates reported by transgender sex workers were twice those of transgender non-sex workers based on data from the National Transgender Discrimination Survey. A main cause of unemployment among the transgender sex worker population is the compounded stigma of being transgender and being involved in sex work, as both of these populations are unlikely to access health services or job opportunities due to social discrimination. Transgender sex workers of color experience higher rates of unemployment than white sex workers, in addition to being at higher risk for HIV and other STIs.

Transgender sex workers often request, and also have difficulty accessing, job training and placement services. Rates of accessing health care, temporary shelter, and financial assistance are all higher than rates of accessing job placement or job trainings. These rates are also affected by race; for example, African American transgender sex workers were less likely to have access to job programs than Latina transgender sex workers.

== Health issues ==
=== Sexually transmitted infection risk ===
Sex workers as a population experience higher risk for various health conditions, including HIV and other sexually transmitted infections (STIs). People engaging in sex exchange services are likely to receive or transmit HIV or other STIs because of the likelihood of engaging in risky sexual behaviors (e.g., sex without a condom, sex with multiple partners) and substance use. The Centers for Disease Control and Prevention (CDC) reports that because data for transgender people are not uniformly collected there is a major lack of information about HIV-positive transgender people in the United States. The dearth of information regarding transgender people does not exist solely in the United States, however. There is an urgent need for HIV data for transgender sex workers all around the world, especially in Africa, eastern Europe, and central Asia. This worldwide gap in available information is a result of structural barriers created by the legal structures of different countries and continued criminalization of sex work.

According to the CDC, data collected by local health departments and scientists studying transgender communities have shown high levels of HIV and disparities between racial groups. In a systematic review of HIV infection in the United States, African-American transgender women were most likely to test HIV-positive. 56% of African-American transgender women had positive HIV test results compared to 17% of white transgender women and 16% of Hispanic transgender women. Transgender sex workers, especially transgender women, have a higher risk of carrying or contracting HIV. From the data collected it has been estimated that as many as 1-in-4 transgender female sex workers are HIV-positive. HIV testing programs and HIV prevention programs for transgender individuals could potentially reduce the risk for infection while also helping HIV-positive transgender sex workers access health care.

Transgender sex workers worldwide are at higher risk of contracting HIV and other STIs as well. In a study on sex workers in Jakarta, Indonesia, waria, or third gender people, were found to have HIV rates over five times the rates of cisgender male sex workers and syphilis rates almost 10 times the rates present in the cisgender male sex worker community. The results of this study have implications for the wider population in Jakarta as well, as many of the sex workers interviewed reported bisexual activity. Sex workers in China are often detained in "re-education through labor" (RTL) centers that focus on moral and vocational training. The number of detained sex workers has been on the rise due to the recent uptick in HIV rates among heterosexual men. However, incarceration in an RTL center makes accessing information about HIV and STIs difficult, mostly due to social stigma of imprisonment and sex work in general, which only further increases rates of HIV and STIs in sex workers.

=== Health care services ===
Experiences of discrimination in a health care setting can delay a sex worker's willingness to seek medical care in the future. Refusing to seek medical treatment for seemingly minor medical issues may lead to initially innocuous issues becoming more serious and more difficult to treat. Insensitivity from health care professionals has been cited as a reason that sex education and medical services are not accessed. Reports of insensitive behavior among health care providers (e.g., misgendering, using the wrong name, etc.) suggest that some services are lacking in terms of provision of culturally sensitive interactions and possible provisions of trans health care. In addition to the health care problems experienced by transgender men and women, traditional health care plans do not always cover the costs relative to transitioning, which may lead to men and women resorting to alternative methods to pay for transitioning or force them to seek out unsafe methods of making these changes such as using hormones bought off the street or sharing needles while injecting hormones.

Various methods have been implemented to help transgender sex workers gain information about HIV and safe sex practices. The use of mobile outreach units in Lima, Peru was effective in reaching transgender women and identifying HIV-positive transgender women who did not previously know their status. The Sisters program in Thailand, which primarily serves kathoeys, emphasizes the use of peer support networks and outreach efforts and has increased condom usage in kathoey sex worker populations with clients. Despite this success, however, there was no increase in condom usage with casual or long-term partners. While there has been success with implementing HIV prevention programs in different countries around the world, a lack of information about HIV programs for lesbian, gay, bisexual, and especially transgender sex workers limits the extent to which effective, long-term solutions can be produced.

Pre-exposure prophylaxis, or PrEP, is an effective method of preventing HIV contraction when taken regularly and used in combination with condoms. However, barriers to accessing general health care prevent transgender sex workers from accessing PrEP and other HIV-preventing medications as well. Demand for PrEP exists within the transgender sex worker community but low awareness of the drug, cost of the medication, and confusion about where to get PrEP create an environment in which sex workers cannot effectively access it. A study on PrEP usage in the men who have sex with men and transgender women sex worker communities recommended increasing access to PrEP by spreading more accurate information about PrEP as well as providing ways to get PrEP for a cheaper price.

== Discrimination ==
An animation showing the 2012 status of legal protections based on sexual orientation and gender identity in the United States

Transgender and sex worker populations have difficulty accessing health care services due to social stigma. This difficulty is further compounded at the intersection of these two populations. A survey of sex workers, which included transgender responses, in four African countries, Kenya, Zimbabwe, Uganda, and South Africa, reported that denial of treatment for injuries associated with physical or sexual assault as well as general public services was common. Recent legal moves within the United States have been made to legalize this kind of discrimination within the health care sector with the First Amendment Defense Act (FADA). In the United States, transgender people do not always have job protections as anti-discrimination bills vary between states, which means that transgender people can lose their job on the basis of their gender identity. Due to this lack of protections, transgender people are at a higher risk of experiencing unemployment and finding employment in unofficial markets like the sex work industry.

In Mexico, transgender sex workers are not included in official HIV prevention materials despite being part of a population that is at a very high risk of contracting HIV. Many factors contribute to this higher risk, such as socioeconomic status, the context in which sex work takes place, and the stigma that is associated with sex work and transgender identity as a whole. However, programs in Mexico that aim for lower rates of HIV and other STIs do not address these root causes directly, instead taking an approach that focuses on quick action by providing condoms and other prevention measures.

== Physical and sexual violence ==
Transgender people are likely to experience high levels of violence and harassment from strangers, people in the home, or people they know. They are also at a higher risk of being victims of sexual or physical assault multiple times. There is also a high prevalence of sexual assault and rape starting at a young age. In the United States, the most common finding across self-surveys and needs assessments is that about 50% of transgender people report unwanted sexual activity. The majority of perpetrators of sexual violence are people who are known to the victim, including partners and family members.

Participating in the sex industry comes with a higher risk of experiencing violence. Sex workers work in a variety of settings and are often open to exploitation, harassment, and physical and sexual abuse from clients, managers, and police.

According to self-reported surveys from sex workers in the U.S. most unwanted sexual violence has come from clients. This violence may be motivated by perpetrators hatred or negative attitudes toward transgender people. Self reported surveys have become a major form of data collection on sex worker violence in part due to research by Departments of Health or social service organizations. Since these institutions have a large focus on data pertaining to sexual activity there are more reports relative to sexual violence in comparison to other forms of violence.

These experiences are not always reported to the police which can affect crime reporting rates, which may be due to mistrust of the police or fear of discrimination. Transgender sex workers around the world experience high levels of police violence in particular. Sex workers in Nepal, Mexico, and other countries often report verbal and physical harassment at the hands of police officers as well as sexual violence in some extreme cases. International human rights guidelines do not provide explicit protections for sex workers but also do not explicitly exclude sex workers, meaning that sex workers facing police brutality are victims of human rights violations. In some cases, police brutality works against the push for limiting the spread of STIs as they confiscate the condoms that sex workers have on them or refuse to use a condom when having sex with them.

== See also ==
- Sex workers' rights
- SistaazHood
- Transgender rights
- Transgender discrimination
- Transgender inequality
- Transgender health care
- Walking while trans
