= Ariston Bathhouse raid =

1903 New York City anti-gay police raid

Coordinates: 40°45′53″N 73°58′55″W

The Ariston Bathhouse raid in 1903 was the first anti-gay police raid on an establishment in New York City. It resulted in thirty-four arrests, sixteen charges of sodomy, and twelve trials, five of which have transcripts.

== Raid ==
On February 21, 1903, at 9 PM, two undercover officers, Thomas Phelan and Norman Fitzsimmons, entered the Ariston Bathhouse. Since the building had been under surveillance by the police, at least one officer, Fitzsimmons, had entered the establishment at least twice before the raid. Twenty minutes after arrival, according to his court testimony, Phelan was approached sexually by a man named Walter Bennett. After Bennett turned down Fitzsimmons's request to join, on the basis of Bennett preferring "fat boy[s]", they arranged to meet at 2:30 AM. Shortly afterward, two other undercover officers joined Phelan and Fitzsimmons. They spent some time observing the bathhouse to gather evidence to incriminate patrons, and witnessed multiple instances of anal and oral sex, which they later recounted at the trials.

At 1:45 AM, a group of police officers entered the establishment and blocked the exits so that none of the 78 men inside could escape. They arrested 34 men against whom they had complaints. The rest were let go with a warning. The owner of the bathhouse, John Begley, was accused of keeping a disorderly house and was held on $2,000 bail. Of the men arrested, some were charged with liquor law violations and disorderly conduct, and at least 16 were charged with sodomy. Twelve of those sixteen were sent to trial, and five trials have transcripts that are viewable today. Of these five trials, three returned verdicts of guilty, one verdict of guilty with a recommendation to mercy, and a mistrial. However, two of the guilty verdicts were later appealed.

The police had spent several weeks collecting evidence against men who entered the bathhouse, which they did in conjunction with the Society for the Prevention of Crime. They used this evidence to create two diagrams of the bathhouse that were used in the trials.

== Trials ==
In People v. Kregel, the defense relied on the physical impossibility of sodomy under the circumstances in which the defendant was charged with committing the act. Andrew Kregel was a tailor who was married with five children. At trial, Kregel was said to have entered the bathhouse around 1:00 AM, where he was approached by a man named Charles Chamberlin. The prosecution alleged that Chamberlin had performed anal sex with Kregel, while another man, John Rogers, performed oral sex on Kregel. All three were arrested by police about an hour later. However, Kregel denied the alleged sex acts, and maintained that he had never been to a Turkish bathhouse before and that he received the ticket to the bathhouse from a customer at his shop in exchange for fixing a coat.

At that point, Dr. Pierre A. Siegelstein was called by the defense. He said that he had testified in two prior sodomy trials, and that anal sex performed by two men standing up was physically impossible for physiological reasons. A medical expert specializing in sex crime cases, William Travers Gibb, refuted this claim, and said that upright anal sex was possible. Eventually, it was declared a mistrial and Kregel's bail was reduced from $2,000 to $750.

In People v. Galbert, the defense cited the "physical impossibility" and "mathematical impossibility" of the crime. A bathhouse employee was called and testified that the couches in the room where Galbert was found were a little more than 1 foot (0.30 m) high, and Charles LeBarbier, Galbert's attorney, suggested that the couches were too low to permit the crime to have taken place. Galbert was an architect for Carrère and Hastings. Carrere, also an architect, was called to attest to Galbert's mental health along with four other character witnesses. When Galbert was found guilty, LaBarbier used his resistance against the police during his arrest as a testament to his masculinity.

In People v. Schnittel, Arthur C. Butts, Schnittel's attorney, presented evidence of Schnittel's heterosexuality. He was accused of performing oral sex on another man by police, as well as walking about the bathhouse wearing a sheet the same way that a woman might. He was also accused of having a venereal disease because of large, blotchy patches of red on his face. The defense alleged that Schnittel had entered the bathhouse to clear up the skin condition. Schnittel himself claimed that he had never been in the room where the alleged sex acts took place, and the defense attempted to cement his masculinity by pointing out his engagement ring. The jury returned a verdict of guilty.

In People v. Bennett, Bennett's attorney also cited his client's heterosexuality and desire for women as proof that he was innocent. The police accused him of wearing a sheet as a woman might, as well as engaging in oral and anal sex with another man. Two women and a minister who knew Bennett were called. One of the women, Catherine Bolton, said that she had known Bennett since he was fourteen years old and implied that she had been romantically involved with him at some point. The prosecutor claimed that the feminine perspectives of the women and the minister were not a good indication of Bennett's character, and implied that Bennett was not unlike the women himself.

In People v. Casson, Casson denied the charge of sodomy, but admitted to being in the bathhouse. The officer who arrested him testified that he had arrested him shortly after the alleged act took place. The jury returned a verdict of guilty with a recommendation to mercy.

== See also ==
- LGBTQ history in New York
- Sodomy laws in the United States
