= LGBTQ history in New York =

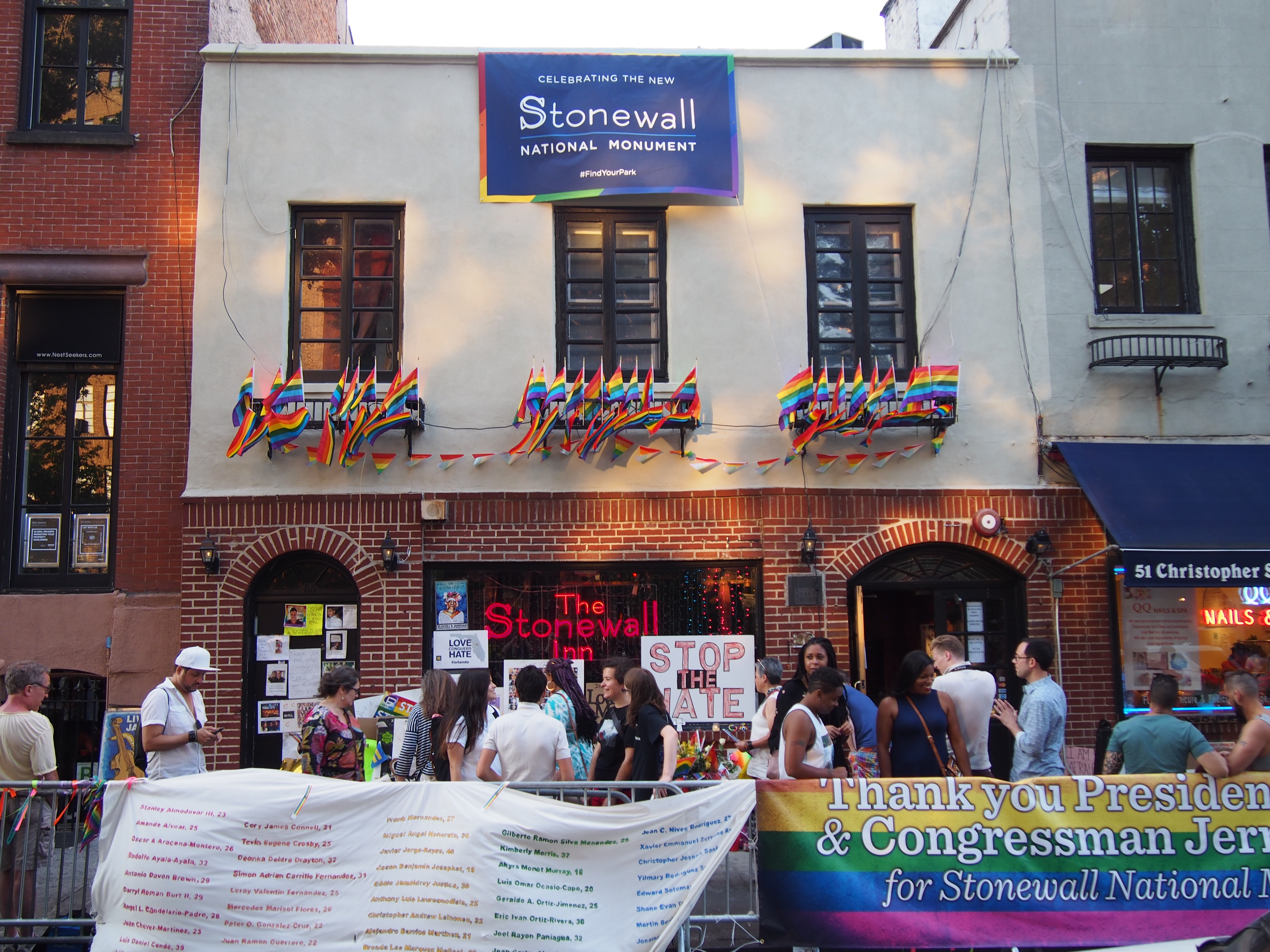
The Stonewall Inn in the gay enclave of Greenwich Village; site of the June 1969 Stonewall riots, the cradle of the modern LGBT rights movement and an icon of queer culture is adorned with rainbow pride flags.

New York state, a state in the northeastern United States, has one of the largest and the most prominent LGBTQ populations in the world. Brian Silverman, the author of Frommer's New York City from $90 a Day, wrote that New York City has "one of the world's largest, loudest, and most powerful" LGBT communities", and "Gay and lesbian culture is as much a part of New York's basic identity as yellow cabs, high-rises, and Broadway theatre". LGBT travel guide Queer in the World states, "The fabulosity of Gay New York is unrivaled on Earth, and queer culture seeps into every corner of its five boroughs". LGBT Americans in New York City constitute by significant margins the largest self-identifying lesbian, gay, bisexual, and transgender communities in the United States, and the 1969 Stonewall riots in Greenwich Village are widely considered to be the genesis of the modern gay rights movement.

As of 2005, New York City was home to an estimated 272,493 self-identifying gay and bisexual individuals. The New York City metropolitan area had an estimated 568,903 self-identifying GLB residents. Meanwhile, New York City is also home to the largest transgender population in the United States, estimated at 50,000 in 2018, concentrated in Manhattan and Queens. Albany, the state capital of New York, is also a progressive hub for the LGBTQ community.

New York State possesses a long history of presence of lesbian, gay, bisexual, and transgender people residing in, and often being convicted in, the state. Sexual relations between persons of the same sex (variously described as "sodomy", "buggery" or "sins of carnal nature") was illegal for most of the history of New York from its days as a Dutch colony through its colonization and independence from British rule as a state in the Union, until such relations were legalized by judicial action in 1981. Activism for the rights of LGBT people in the state began with the rise of protest actions by the first "homophile" organizations in the 1950s and 1960s, although LGBT activism was propelled into a watershed moment in the 1969 Stonewall riots and the later protests against the apathy of civil and political institutions to the AIDS/HIV crisis. Various organizations were established for LGBT people to advocate for rights and provide human services, the impact of which was increasingly felt at state level.

The most recent culminations of LGBT rights in New York include the passage of the Marriage Equality Act in June 2011, granting the legalization of same-sex marriage to New York residents, and the U.S. Supreme Court's decision in the New York-originated landmark case United States v. Windsor to strike down key federal prohibitions against the recognition of lawful same-sex marriages throughout the United States.

As of 2017, plans were advancing by the State of New York to host the largest international LGBT pride celebration in 2019, known as Stonewall 50 – WorldPride NYC 2019, to commemorate the 50th anniversary of the Stonewall riots. In New York City, the Stonewall 50 - WorldPride NYC 2019 events produced by Heritage of Pride will be enhanced through a partnership made with the I LOVE NY program's LGBT division and shall include a welcome center during the weeks surrounding the Stonewall 50 / WorldPride events that is open to all. Additional commemorative arts, cultural, and educational programing to mark the 50th anniversary of the rebellion at the Stonewall Inn will be taking place throughout the city and the world; it is believed that 2019 will be the largest international LGBT pride celebration held in history.

== 1600–1799 ==
From the time of the first European settlements in what is now New York, sodomy was considered a capital offense. The New Netherland colony did not retain Dutch criminal law, but the West India Company, which was given legislative powers, gave the rulers of the colony powers to punish capital offenses, which may have included sodomy due to recorded punishments for the crime.

In 1646, the first sodomy trial in the territory of New Netherland convicted Jan Creoli on a second offense of sodomy and sentenced him to death by strangulation; his body was then "burned to ashes". A second accused, Nicolas Hillebrant (or Hillebrantsen), was scheduled for a trial in 1658, but no further records indicate progress in the trial or an outcome; a third conviction in 1660, that of Jan Quisthout van der Linde (or Linden), who was accused of having had sex with his male servant, resulted in his being tied in a sack and dunked into a river to drown, while the servant was flogged.

This status quo of the death penalty for sodomy would remain unchanged after New Netherland was taken by the Duke of York in 1664, and "buggery" was retained as a capital offense. However, a portion of modern New York fell from 1674 to 1702 within the northern portion of Quaker-majority West Jersey, whose criminal code was silent on sodomy.

In 1796, the state's punishment for sodomy was reduced from death to a maximum of 14 years at either solitude or hard labor.

== 19th century ==
The area comprising present-day New York City, as America's most populous urban center, nearly doubled its population during the first half of the 19th century (from 1800 to 1820 and again by 1840, to 300 000). The city saw the beginnings of a homosexual subculture concomitantly growing with the population.

=== Sodomy laws ===
New York's sodomy laws remained in flux, when an 1801 law raised the punishment to compulsory life imprisonment, with hard labor or solitary confinement as additional attachments; the law was reduced in 1828 to a maximum of 10 years and an expunging of the hard labor and solitude options. The law was again changed in 1881, with sodomy now limited to a maximum of 5–20 years. A revision in 1892 eliminated the 5-year minimum.

The first reported sodomy case in the state's history, Lambertson v. People (1861), resulted in a conviction for buggery. An 1898 case was prosecuted by the New York Society for the Prevention of Cruelty to Children, involving a man to allegedly assist another teenage boy to engage in sodomy with another teenage minor.

=== Poetic descriptions ===
Continuing the theme of loving male friendship, the American poet Walt Whitman arrived in New York in 1841. He is widely believed to have been bisexual or gay, and was immediately drawn to young working-class men found in certain parks, public baths, the docks, and some bars and dance halls. He kept records of the men and boys, usually noting age, physical characteristics, job, and origins. Dispersed in his praise of the city are moments of male admiration, such as in Calamus—"frequent and swift flash of eyes offering me robust, athletic love" or in poem Crossing Brooklyn Ferry, where he writes:

Was call'd by my nighest name by clear loud voices of young men as they saw me / approaching or passing, / Felt their arms on my neck as I stood, or the negligent leaning of their flesh against me as / I sat, / Saw many I loved in the street or ferry-boat or public assembly, yet never told them a / word, / Lived the same life with the rest, the same old laughing, gnawing, sleeping, / Play'd the part that still looks back on the actor or actress, / The same old role, the role that is what we make it, as great as we like, / Or as small as we like, or both great and small.

Sometimes Whitman's writing verged on explicit, such as in his poem "Native Moments"—"I share the midnight orgies of young men / I pick out some low person for my dearest friend. He shall be lawless, rude, illiterate." Poems like these, Calamus (inspired by Whitman's treasured friends and possible lover, Fred Vaughan, who lived with the Whitman family in the 1850s) and the general theme of manly love functioned as a pseudonym for homosexuality.

The developing sub-community had a coded voice to draw more gay and bisexual men to New York and other growing American urban centers. Whitman did, however, in 1890 denounce any sexuality in the comradeship of his works and historians still debate whether he was a practicing homosexual, bisexual, etc. But this denouncement shows that homosexuality had become a public question by the end of the 19th century.

Twenty years after Whitman came to New York, Horatio Alger continued the theme of manly love in his stories of the young Victorian self-made man. He came to New York fleeing from a public scandal with a young man in Cape Cod that forced him to leave the ministry, in 1866.

=== Other developments ===
In 1888, the Everard Baths, a Victorian Turkish bath, was opened, and would gain a growth in reputation among homosexual men.

In 1895 a group of self-described androgynes in New York organized a club called the Cercle Hermaphroditos, based on their wish "to unite for defense against the world's bitter persecution". The group included Jennie June (born in 1874 as Earl Lind), who described herself as a "fairie" or "androgyne", which to her meant an individual, as she said, "with male genitals", but whose "psychical constitution" and sexual life "approach the female type".

== 20th century ==
=== 1900–1949 ===
Early 20th century

Beginning in the late 1800s into the 20th century, people, typically young gay men, known as 'fairies,' were feminine-presenting sex workers. It was believed that sexuality was tied to behavior, and this ideology allowed for straight-identified men to have sex with fairies, but maintain their masculinity and heterosexuality.

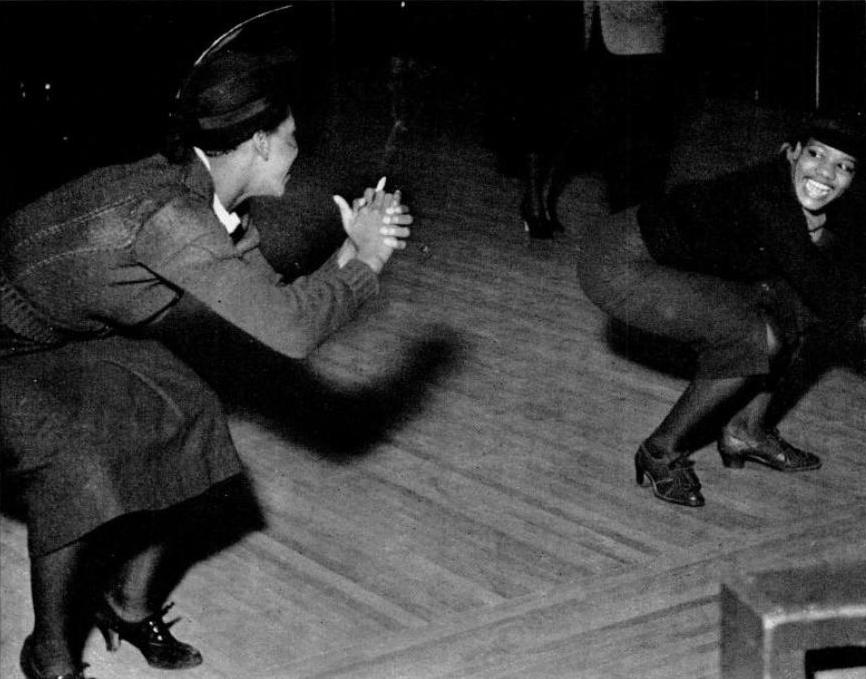
Dancing at the Savoy Ballroom, 1936

==== Bathhouses in the early 1900s ====
On February 21, 1903, New York police conducted the first recorded vice raid on a gay bathhouse, the Ariston Hotel Baths. 26 men were arrested, and 12 brought to trial on sodomy charges; seven men received sentences ranging from four to 20 years in prison.

The Everard Baths was patronized largely by homosexuals by the 1920s and became the community's preeminent social venue from the 1930s onward. It was patronized by gay men before the 1920s and by the 1930s had a reputation as "classiest, safest, and best known of the baths," eventually picking up the nickname, Everhard. On January 5, 1919, the New York Society for the Suppression of Vice encouraged a police raid on the Everard Baths in which the manager and nine customers were arrested for lewd behavior. It was raided again in 1920 with 15 arrests.

Also popular in the 1910s were the Produce Exchange Baths and the Lafayette Baths (403–405 Lafayette Street, which from 1916 was managed by Ira & George Gershwin). American precisionist painter Charles Demuth used the Lafayette Baths as his favourite haunt. His 1918 homoerotic self-portrait set in a Turkish Bathhouse is likely to have been inspired by it. The Penn Post Baths in a hotel basement (The Penn Post Hotel, 304 West 31st Street) was a popular gay location in the 1920s despite a lack of private rooms and seedy condition.

The American composer Charles Griffes (1884–1920) wrote in his diaries about visits to the New York bathhouses and the YMCA. His biography states: "So great was his need to be with boys, that though his home contained two pianos, he chose to practice at an instrument at the Y, and his favorite time was when the players were coming and going from their games."

==== Drag balls ====
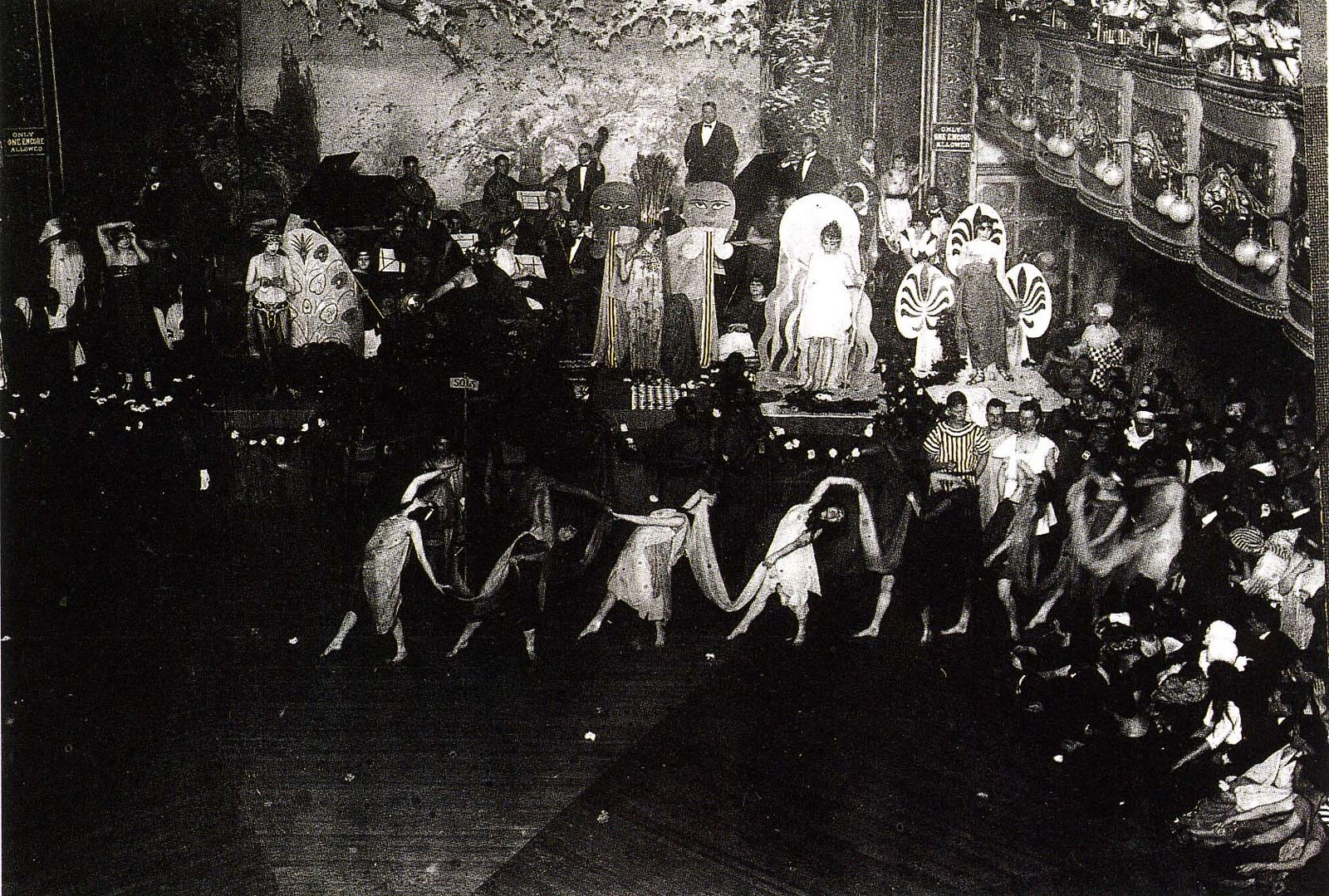
A drag ball in the 1920s, celebrated in the Webster Hall, in Greenwich Village, Lower Manhattan

==== Lobotomies and sterilization ====
A 1912 sterilization law was enacted in order to allow asylums for the criminally insane to sterilize mostly female detainees who were perceived as potentially mothering of undesirable children. Used 42 times between 1912 and 1918, the law was struck down with harsh language by the Supreme Court of Albany County, a ruling which was confirmed by the Appellate Division of the State Supreme Court and validated by a 1920 legislative repeal.

==== Other events ====
A 1923 municipal law prohibited loitering for sodomy within the city limits of New York City.

Eve's Hangout, also called Eve Addams' Tearoom, was an after-theater club run by Polish-Jewish lesbian émigré Eva Kotchever (Czlotcheber) from 1925 to 1926. It closed when she was convicted of obscenity and disorderly conduct, which resulted in her deportation.

=== 1940–1949 ===
A 1942 medical journal article by the Journal of Criminal Psychopathology described the lobotomization, using only local anaesthetics, of a homosexual man convicted for sodomy; a later study showed that he had mentally degenerated as a result of the lobotomy.

In 1948, New York native Gore Vidal's third novel, The City and the Pillar, was published by E. P. Dutton in New York. It was the first post-World War II novel whose openly gay and well-adjusted protagonist is not killed off at the end of the story for defying social norms. It is also recognized as one of the "definitive war-influenced gay novels", being one of the few books of its period dealing directly with male homosexuality. The book's publication caused a major literary scandal, with the New York Times refusing to publish it and Vidal's books being blacklisted from most major critical publications for the next six years, forcing Vidal to write and publish under pseudonyms until his reputation recovered.

=== 1950–1969 ===
In 1950, New York made legal history when it became the first state in the Union to reduce sodomy to a misdemeanor, with a maximum penalty of six months in prison. Nevertheless, anti-LGBT policies continued unabated, and residents in the gay villages of New York City began to increasingly become disenchanted with silent acceptance of police raids. The New York chapter of the Mattachine Society was established in 1955 (incorporated in 1961), and Barbara Gittings established the New York chapter of the Daughters of Bilitis September 20, 1958.

The election of Mayor John Lindsay in 1965 signaled a major shift in city politics, and a new attitude toward sexual mores began changing the social atmosphere of New York. On April 21, 1966, Dick Leitsch, president of the New York Mattachine Society and two other members staged the Sip-in at the Julius bar on West 10th Street in Greenwich Village. This resulted in the anti-gay accommodation rules of the NY State Liquor Authority being overturned in subsequent court actions. These SLA provisions declared that it was illegal for homosexuals to congregate and be served alcoholic beverages in bars.

An example of when these laws had been upheld is in 1940 when Gloria's, a bar that had been closed for such violations, fought the case in court and lost. Prior to this change in the law, the business of running a gay bar had to involve paying bribes to the police and Mafia. As soon as the law was altered, the SLA ceased closing legally licensed gay bars and such bars could no longer be prosecuted for serving gays and lesbians. Mattachine pressed this advantage very quickly and Mayor Lindsay was confronted with the issue of police entrapment in gay bars, resulting in this practice being stopped.

On the heels of this victory, the mayor cooperated in getting questions about homosexuality removed from NYC hiring practices. The police and fire departments resisted the new policy, however, and refused to cooperate. The result of these changes in the law, combined with the open social- and sexual-attitudes of the late Sixties, led to the increased visibility of gay life in New York. Several licensed gay bars were in operation in Greenwich Village and the Upper West Side, as well as illegal, unlicensed places serving alcohol, such as the Stonewall Inn and the Snakepit, both in Greenwich Village.

The Stonewall riots were a series of violent protests between gay men, drag queens, and lesbians against a police officer raid in New York City. The first night of rioting began on Friday, June 28, 1969, at about 1:20 am, when police raided the Stonewall Inn, a gay bar operating without a state license in Greenwich Village. Stonewall is considered a turning point for the modern gay rights movement worldwide. Newspaper coverage of the events was minor in the city, since, in the Sixties, huge marches and mass rioting had become commonplace and the Stonewall disturbances were relatively small.

It was also after 1959 that former male model John B. Whyte bought the Pines Hotel (renamed the Fire Island Pines Botel) on Fire Island, helping to build up a significant LGBT tourist presence both at the resort and in the adjacent hamlet Cherry Grove, New York, over the subsequent decades.

In 1966 bisexual activist Robert A. Martin (aka Donny the Punk) founded the Student Homophile League at Columbia University and New York University. In 1967 Columbia University officially recognized this group, thus making them the first college in the United States to officially recognize a gay student group.

Also in 1966, the first case to consider transsexualism in the US was heard, Mtr. of Anonymous v. Weiner, 50 Misc. 2d 380, 270 N.Y.S.2d 319 (1966). The case concerned a transsexual person from New York City who had undergone sex reassignment surgery and wanted a change of name and sex on their birth certificate. The New York City Health Department refused to grant the request, and the court ruled that the New York City and New Jersey Health Code only permitted a change of sex on the birth certificate if an error was made recording it at birth, so the Health Department acted correctly. The decision of the court in Weiner was affirmed in Mtr. of Hartin v. Dir. of Bur. of Recs., 75 Misc. 2d 229, 232, 347 N.Y.S.2d 515 (1973) and Anonymous v. Mellon, 91 Misc. 2d 375, 383, 398 N.Y.S.2d 99 (1977).

In the late 1960s in New York, Mario Martino founded the Labyrinth Foundation Counseling Service, which was the first transgender community-based organization that specifically addressed the needs of female-to-male transsexuals.

=== 1970–1979 ===
The commemorative march held one year after the riots, organized by the impetus of Craig Rodwell, owner of the Oscar Wilde Bookshop, drew 5,000 marchers up New York City's Sixth Avenue, which drew nationwide publicity and put the Stonewall events on the historical map and led to the modern-day pride marches. A new period of liberalism in the late 1960s began a new era of more social acceptance for homosexuality which lasted until the late 1970s.

In the 1970s, the popularity of disco music and its culture in many ways made society more accepting of gays and lesbians. In 1971, the first version of the Sexual Orientation Non-Discrimination Act was introduced into both houses of the state legislature. In 1974, the Village of Alfred (pop. 1,000) became the first municipality in the state to pass a gay rights ordinance which prohibited discrimination on the basis of sexual orientation.

In 1972 bisexual activist Don Fass founded the National Bisexual Liberation Group in New York City, which issued The Bisexual Expression, most likely the earliest bisexual newsletter.

The Lesbian Herstory Archives were created in 1974.

Conditions, a feminist magazine emphasizing writing by lesbians, was created in 1976, and continued until 1990, featuring writing by Audre Lorde, Jewelle Gomez, Paula Gunn Allen, and others.

Also in 1977, Renee Richards, a transgender woman, was granted entry to the U.S. Open (in tennis) after a ruling in her favor by the New York Supreme Court. This was considered a landmark decision in favor of transgender rights.

In circulation from 1977 to 1979, Gaysweek existed as the first openly LGBT weekly newspaper in New York. At the time, it was only one of three weekly LGBT publications in the world, and the first to be owned by an African-American.

Late in 1979, a new religious revival ushered in the conservatism that would reign in the United States during the 1980s and made life hard once again for LGBT people.

=== 1980–1989 ===
The New York Court of Appeals case New York v. Onofre abolished most remaining laws regarding sodomy in New York. In 1983, the Lesbian, Gay, Bisexual & Transgender Community Center was established in New York City.

In 1985, the Gay & Lesbian Alliance Against Defamation was formed by a group of gay and lesbian artisans in New York City.

In 1981, AIDS/HIV was discovered and announced, leading to several more cases of the disease from around the world in the decades ahead. Among other LGBT communities, the New York LGBT community was hit especially hard by the epidemic, with many dying due to transmission. It galvanized local playwright and novelist Larry Kramer into activism, first helping to establish the Gay Men's Health Crisis organization in 1982 before being kicked out of the organization for his militancy. Kramer then established the direct action-oriented organization ACT UP in 1987, a national organization which would target several prominent organizations, the government and businesses for their apathy to AIDS/HIV victims.

On December 10, 1989, ACT UP and WHAM led a protest of at least 4,500 protesters, known as "Stop the Church", which managed to infiltrate the St. Patrick's Cathedral before some 150 protesters were arrested. It was the largest demonstration against a religious organization in U.S. history.

An October 1989 Cosmopolitan magazine article that stereotyped bisexual men as dishonest spreaders of AIDS led to a letter-writing campaign by the New York Area Bisexual Network (NYABN). Cosmopolitan has printed no articles defaming bisexuals since the campaign.

In 1989, the trans man Johnny Science formed the first FTM social group in New York City, called F2M Fraternity.

Nelson Sullivan was a 1980s videographer who was ubiquitous on Lower Manhattan's art and club scenes during the 1980s. He filmed many 1980s New York LGBT identities as part of documenting his social life. New York University's 5 Ninth Avenue Project began digitizing and uploading his 1,900 hours of tape to YouTube from 2008 onwards.

=== 1990–1999 ===
In 1990, Deborah Glick, who is lesbian, became the first openly LGBT member of the State House of Representatives.

In 1990, Queer Nation was founded by sixty LGBT individuals in New York City as a response to violent acts of homophobia and transphobia in New York streets. The organization's introduction into the LGBT rights scene involved acts aiming to promote queer positivity, visibility, and breaking beyond heteronormative social barriers. Throughout 1990, Queer Nation organized multiple protests in response to acts of violence against LGBT individuals. In addition, some began as a result of social pressures and prejudices against accepting and representing LGBT individuals. Many of these protests were characterized by the use of different slogans aiming to highlight the permanence of queer identity, and its presence within the population of the city. Following its eventful founding year, Queer Nation expanded its reach throughout the rest of the early 1990s nationwide, including Atlanta, Portland, San Francisco, and Denver.

Beginning in 1992, a number of efforts began in New York City to preserve historically important LGBT sites. This initiative started with Andrew S. Dolkart, author of Guide to New York City Landmarks, who brought several historic LGBT locations into the guide for the very first time. The preservation committee working behind the scenes to make these inclusions possible began to bring the unique styles and characteristics of certain landmarks into the public eye. Some of these features can be traced back to queer social developments in the late 1800s. Significant LGBT landmarks were slow to be recognized in light of a lack of a structured and proper organization of efforts to do so. Despite this, the foundation created by these early efforts in the 1990s would allow for New York City to eventually become a leader in preserving and recognizing historic LGBT landmarks.

From 1993 to 1994, work took place on an old public school, known as Rivington House, that had initially been operated as a public school after its construction in 1898. In 1995, the work was complete and the Rivington House was re-opened with the purpose of serving as a care facility for New Yorkers infected with AIDS. As this was still during a time when treatments for AIDS were not advanced enough to provide long-term outcomes for patients, the facility was oriented towards providing end-of-life care for its patients.

Rivington House was granted an initial budget of $33 million to support its 219-bed capacity and its small outpatient center. It was the largest treatment center of its kind for AIDS patients in the entire United States. During the care facility's first year of operation, the mortality rate for its patients stood at 50% and the average stay was approximately two weeks. By 1997, new advancements in the treatment of AIDS reduced the mortality rate to 30% and increased the longevity of patients committed to the facility up to 120 days on average.

New York City Mayor Rudolph Giuliani signed recognition of a municipal domestic partnerships registry into law in 1997.

== 21st century ==
=== 2000–2010 ===
In 2002, the Sexual Orientation Non-Discrimination Act was passed by the Legislature. Governor George Pataki signed the bill into law, and it went into effect on January 16, 2003.

Also in 2002, the Sylvia Rivera Law Project was founded in New York. Still in existence today, SRLP was named after transgender activist Sylvia Rivera with the mission "to guarantee that all people are free to self-determine gender identity and expression, regardless of income or race, and without facing harassment, discrimination or violence".

In 2005, bisexual scholars and activists mobilized with The Task Force, GLAAD and BiNet USA to meet with New York Times science section editor and researcher Brian Dodge to respond to misinformation the paper had published on a study about bisexual men. The study, entitled Sexual Arousal Patterns of Bisexual Men, by the controversial researcher J. Michael Bailey, allegedly "proved" that bisexual men did not exist. With little critical examination, various media celebrities and outlets jumped on the band-wagon and claimed to have "solved" the "problem of bisexuality" by declaring it to be non-existent, at least in men. Further studies, including improved follow-up research led by Michael Bailey, proved this to be false.

Also in 2005, the Queens Chapter of PFLAG announced the creation of the "Brenda Howard Memorial Award". This was the first time a major American LGBT organization named an award after an openly bisexual person.

Also in 2005, Pauline Park became the first openly transgender person chosen to be grand marshal of the New York City Pride March.

In 2007, an article in the 'Health' section of The New York Times stated that "1.5 percent of American women and 1.7 percent of American men identify themselves [as] bisexual."

In 2008, Governor David Paterson issued a directive for all government agencies to recognize same-sex marriages performed in other states of the Union where such marriages are legally certified. On December 2, 2009, a bill to legalize the performance of same-sex marriage was passed by the assembly but was defeated in the Senate, 38–24.

=== 2010–2019 ===
A renewed push for the legalization of performances of same-sex marriages in New York began under governor Andrew Cuomo, who staked his 2010 campaign for governor on legalization. In June 2011, Cuomo introduced the Marriage Equality Act, which was passed on June 15 by the Assembly. On June 24, 2011, the Legislature passed the bill. Cuomo signed the bill into law at 11:55 on June 24, 2011, and it took effect on July 24, 2011. LGBT activists and others celebrated in various portions of the state, including the front of the Stonewall Inn, only two days to the 42nd anniversary of the riots.

In 2013, New York resident Edith Windsor, the widow of fellow resident Thea Spyer, won a landmark civil class action lawsuit against the United States government in United States v. Windsor, in which the U.S. Supreme Court ruled that Section 3 of the Defense of Marriage Act which, among other things, prohibited Windsor from qualifying for the federal estate tax exemption for surviving spouses, was unconstitutional. This resulted in all legally married same-sex couples in the United States qualifying for federal marriage benefits, and was decided on the same day as the Supreme Court's decision to deny standing for appeal in Hollingsworth v. Perry, allowing for same-sex marriage rights to be restored in California.

In 2019 Lillian Bonsignore became the first openly gay and the first female chief of EMS Operations for the New York City Fire Department.

=== 2020 to present ===
In 2020, the coronavirus pandemic in the United States led to cancellation of most pride parades across the United States during the traditional pride month of June. However, Brooklyn Liberation March, the largest transgender-rights demonstration in LGBTQ history, took place on June 14, 2020, stretching from Grand Army Plaza to Fort Greene, Brooklyn, focused on supporting Black transgender lives, drawing an estimated 15,000 to 20,000 participants. In April 2022, New York City Mayor Eric Adams announced a billboard campaign to woo Floridians to a significantly more supportive environment for LGBTQ+ residents in New York.

== See also ==
- Charles H. Cochrane
- Empire State Pride Agenda
- LGBTQ rights in New York
- List of people executed in New York
- LGBT culture in New York City
- List of LGBT people from New York City
- NYC LGBT Historic Sites Project
- Same-sex marriage in New York
- Stonewall riots
