= Gender Expression Non-Discrimination Act =

Anti-discrimination law in the United States

The Gender Expression Non-Discrimination Act (GENDA) is a 2019 New York law that added gender identity and gender expression to the state's human rights and hate crimes laws as protected classes; banned discrimination in employment, housing, and public accommodations based on gender identity and gender expression; and provided enhanced penalties for bias-motivated crimes. GENDA was first introduced in 2003.

The bill passed the New York State Assembly every year from 2008 to 2019, but did not receive a floor vote in the New York State Senate until January 2019. It was passed by each house of the New York State Legislature on January 15, 2019, and New York Governor Andrew Cuomo signed it into law on January 25, 2019.

== History ==
GENDA was first introduced in 2003. The New York State Assembly passed the bill every year from 2008 to 2019.

On June 8, 2010, GENDA was defeated in the Senate Judiciary Committee. On April 25, 2017, GENDA was defeated by a 3–6 vote in the Senate Committee on Investigations and Government Operations. On May 15, 2018, the Senate Committee on Investigations and Government Operations also defeated GENDA by a vote of 5–4. This would prove to be the final defeat of GENDA.

In 2019, the Committee on Investigations and Government Operations approved GENDA by a 6–0 vote. On January 15, 2019, the State Assembly and the State Senate passed the bill by votes of 100–40 and 42–19, respectively. Governor Andrew Cuomo signed GENDA into law on January 25, 2019.

== Notable cases ==
In 2020, a news editor then employed by Gannett filed a complaint with the New York State Division of Human Rights, alleging executive leadership at The Buffalo News violated state law by refusing to hire him after learning he is transgender. The Division found probable cause in the case, and The Buffalo News paid a settlement.

In 2022, Conor Dwyer Reynolds, then-director of the Police Accountability Board in Rochester, New York, filed a complaint with the New York State Division of Human Rights, claiming the City and its employees discriminated against him based on his sexual orientation. The state granted Reynolds probable cause in 2022. A lawsuit filed by Reynolds against the city alleging sexual harassment and retaliation is currently active.

== Support for GENDA ==
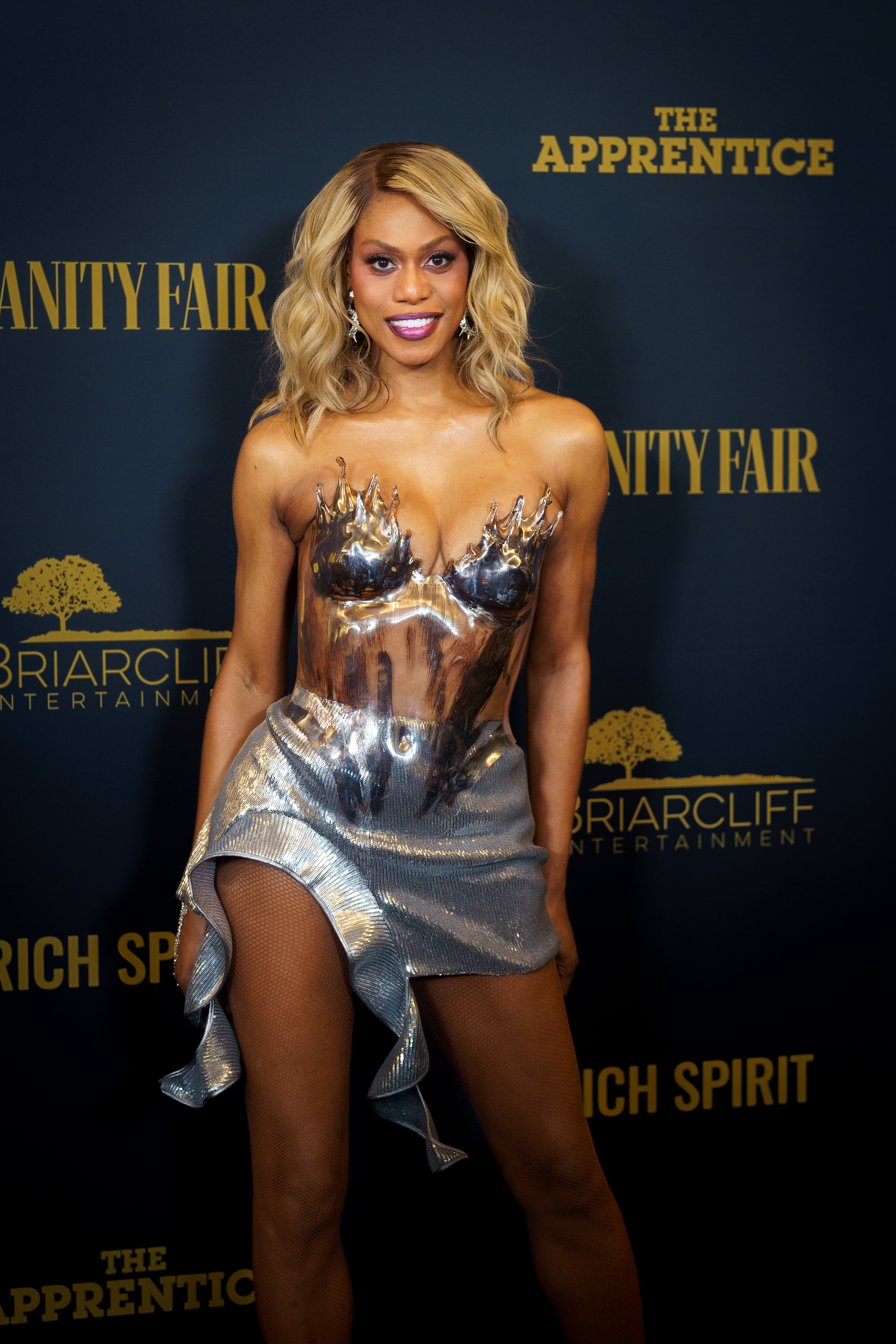
Laverne Cox in 2024

Actress, producer and transgender advocate Laverne Cox traveled to Albany, New York, in March 2013 to speak with New York State legislators to encourage them to pass GENDA. Concerns regarding discrimination in employment, housing, and bathroom rights – meaning whether or not transgender people should have access to sex-segregated spaces that are consistent with their gender identities – motivate Cox and other advocates.

The work of Kiara St. James, co-founder of the New York Transgender Advocacy Group, was considered instrumental to the passage of GENDA.

Despite fears often cited by opponents of this policy, when directly asked by the Senate in October 2012, the chiefs of police in Rochester and Albany noted they found no instances of a transgender person abusing the law and using a segregated bathroom or locker room to harass or perform illegal acts. The chief of police in Albany, Steven Chief Krokoff, stated, "We have had these protections in place in the City of Albany going on for almost a decade, and I am pleased to say it has helped in a number of areas, not only the protection of transgender individuals but our ability to effectively create a safe atmosphere for all citizens of the City of Albany."

== See also ==
- Sexual Orientation Non-Discrimination Act
- New York Human Rights Law
