= New York Human Rights Law =

The New York Human Rights Law (NYHRL) is article 15 of the Executive Law (which is itself chapter 18 of the Consolidated Laws of New York) which prohibits discrimination on the basis of "age, race, creed, color, national origin, sexual orientation, military status, sex, marital status or disability" in employment, housing, education, credit, and access to public accommodations The law was originally passed in 1945 as the Law Against Discrimination, and was the first of its kind in the United States. It is enforced by the New York State Division of Human Rights.

The Sexual Orientation Non-Discrimination Act passed in 2002 added "sexual orientation"; the Gender Expression Non-Discrimination Act is a bill that passed the New York state legislature in January 2019, to explicitly add "gender identity or expression".

== See also ==
- Law of New York
- LGBT rights in New York
- New York City Human Rights Law
- NYC Pride March
