= New York State Division of Human Rights =

The New York State Division of Human Rights is a New York State agency created to enforce the state's Human Rights Law. The Division is a unit of the New York State Executive Department under New York Executive Law section 293. The head of the Division is the Commissioner, who is appointed by the Governor of New York.

The Division was created in 1968, with responsibility to enforce the New York State Human Rights Law, which is codified at New York Executive Law sections 290-301. From 1945 to 1968, the Division was called the State Commission on Discrimination and the Human Rights Law was called the Law Against Discrimination.

The Human Rights Law prohibits discrimination in the provision of housing, employment, credit, and access to certain public places based on specified protected characteristics, which include age, race, gender, sexual orientation, and disability. The Division is responsible for investigating, prosecuting, and adjudicating complaints of discrimination brought under New York's Human Rights Law.

== See also ==
- List of civil rights agencies in the United States
- New York City Human Rights Law
