= Sexual Orientation Non-Discrimination Act =

New York state law

The Sexual Orientation Non-Discrimination Act (SONDA) is a New York law that prohibits discrimination on the basis of actual or perceived sexual orientation in employment, housing, public accommodations, education, credit, and the exercise of civil rights. Passed in 2002, SONDA added the term "sexual orientation" to the list of specifically protected characteristics in various state laws, including the Human Rights Law, the Civil Rights Law, and the Education Law.

== History ==
SONDA was first introduced in the New York State Assembly on February 16, 1971, by Assemblymember Al Blumenthal (D-Manhattan) and in the New York State Senate by Senator Manfred Ohrenstein (D-Manhattan), only to be defeated. The bill was reintroduced in the Assembly in 1983 but was again defeated by a narrow margin.

In 1990, Deborah Glick (D-Manhattan) became the first openly gay member of the Assembly. Glick made SONDA a top priority of her campaign. The legislation was first passed by the Assembly on February 1, 1993, by a vote of 90–50, with 81 Democrats and nine Republicans favoring the bill and 14 Democrats and 36 Republicans opposing it. It was stalled repeatedly in the Senate for the rest of the decade.

On January 28, 2002, the Assembly passed SONDA by a vote of 113–27. On December 17, 2002, the Senate passed the legislation by a vote of 34 to 26; it was signed into law by Governor George Pataki the same day. SONDA went into effect on January 16, 2003.

== Provisions of the law ==
SONDA prohibits discrimination on the basis of actual or perceived sexual orientation in employment; admission to and use of places of public accommodation, resort, or amusement; admission to and use of educational institutions; publicly assisted housing; private housing accommodations and commercial space; and credit. SONDA also prohibits discrimination and/or harassment on the basis of actual or perceived sexual orientation in the exercise of an individual's civil rights. Institutions that are "religious or denominational", together with organizations "operated for charitable or educational purposes", are exempted from the provisions of SONDA. SONDA indirectly applies when a transgender person is discriminated against based on that person's actual or perceived sexual orientation.

In 2019, New York enacted the Gender Expression Non-Discrimination Act (GENDA), which added "gender identity" and "gender expression" as protected categories under New York's Human Rights Law.

Since November 2024, sexual orientation and gender identity was explicitly added to the New York State Constitution by 62.5% approval of New York State voters at the election.

== See also ==
- New York City Gay Rights Bill of 1986
- Equality Act
- Employment Non-Discrimination Act
- Gender Expression Non-Discrimination Act
- New York Human Rights Law
