= 2022 United States House of Representatives elections in Arizona =

- November 8, 2022

All 9 Arizona seats to the United States House of Representatives
	Majority party	Minority party
Party	Republican	Democratic
Last election	4	5
Seats won	6	3
Seat change	▲2	▼2
Popular vote	1,324,961	1,004,462
Percentage	56.14%	42.56%
Swing	▲6.01%	▼7.29%

Republican hold Republican gain
Democratic hold
Republican
50–60%
60–70%
70–80%
90–100%
Democratic
50–60%
60–70%
70–80%

The 2022 United States House of Representatives elections in Arizona were held on November 8, 2022, to determine the nine representatives of the state of Arizona. The elections coincided with the 2022 Arizona gubernatorial election, as well as other elections to the U.S. House of Representatives, the U.S. Senate, and various other state and local elections. Despite losing the concurrent Senate and governor elections, the Republicans flipped both the 2nd and 6th congressional districts, making this the first time that the party controlled six seats in Arizona since 2004. Primaries in Arizona took place on August 2.

== Overview ==
=== Statewide ===
Party	Candidates	Votes		Seats		
Party	Candidates	No.	%	No.	+/–	%
Republican	9	1,324,961	56.14	6	Steady	66.67
Democratic	9	1,016,009	43.05	3	Steady	33.33
Independent	1	18,851	0.80	0	Steady	0.0
Write-in	6	257	0.01	0	Steady	0.0
Total	25	2,360,078	100.0	9	Steady	100.0

Popular vote
Republican	56.14%
Democratic	43.05%
Others	0.81%

House seats
Republican	66.67%
Democratic	33.33%

=== By district ===
Results of the 2022 United States House of Representatives elections in Arizona by district:

District	Republican		Democratic		Others		Total		Result
District	Votes	%	Votes	%	Votes	%	Votes	%	Result
District 1	182,336	50.44%	179,141	49.56%	0	0.00%	361,477	100.00%	Republican hold
District 2	174,169	53.86%	149,151	46.12%	76	0.02%	323,396	100.00%	Republican gain
District 3	32,475	23.02%	108,599	76.98%	0	0.00%	141,074	100.00%	Democratic hold
District 4	116,521	43.89%	148,941	56.10%	36	0.01%	265,498	100.00%	Democratic hold
District 5	182,464	56.74%	120,243	37.39%	18,883	5.87%	321,590	100.00%	Republican hold
District 6	177,201	50.73%	171,969	49.24%	113	0.03%	349,283	100.00%	Republican gain
District 7	69,444	35.46%	126,418	64.54%	0	0.00%	195,862	100.00%	Democratic hold
District 8	197,555	96.50%	7,158	3.50%	0	0.00%	204,713	100.00%	Republican hold
District 9	192,796	97.77%	4,389	2.23%	0	0.00%	197,185	100.00%	Republican hold
Total	1,324,961	56.14%	1,016,009	43.05%	19,108	0.81%	2,360,078	100.00%	

== District 1 ==
2022 Arizona's 1st congressional district election
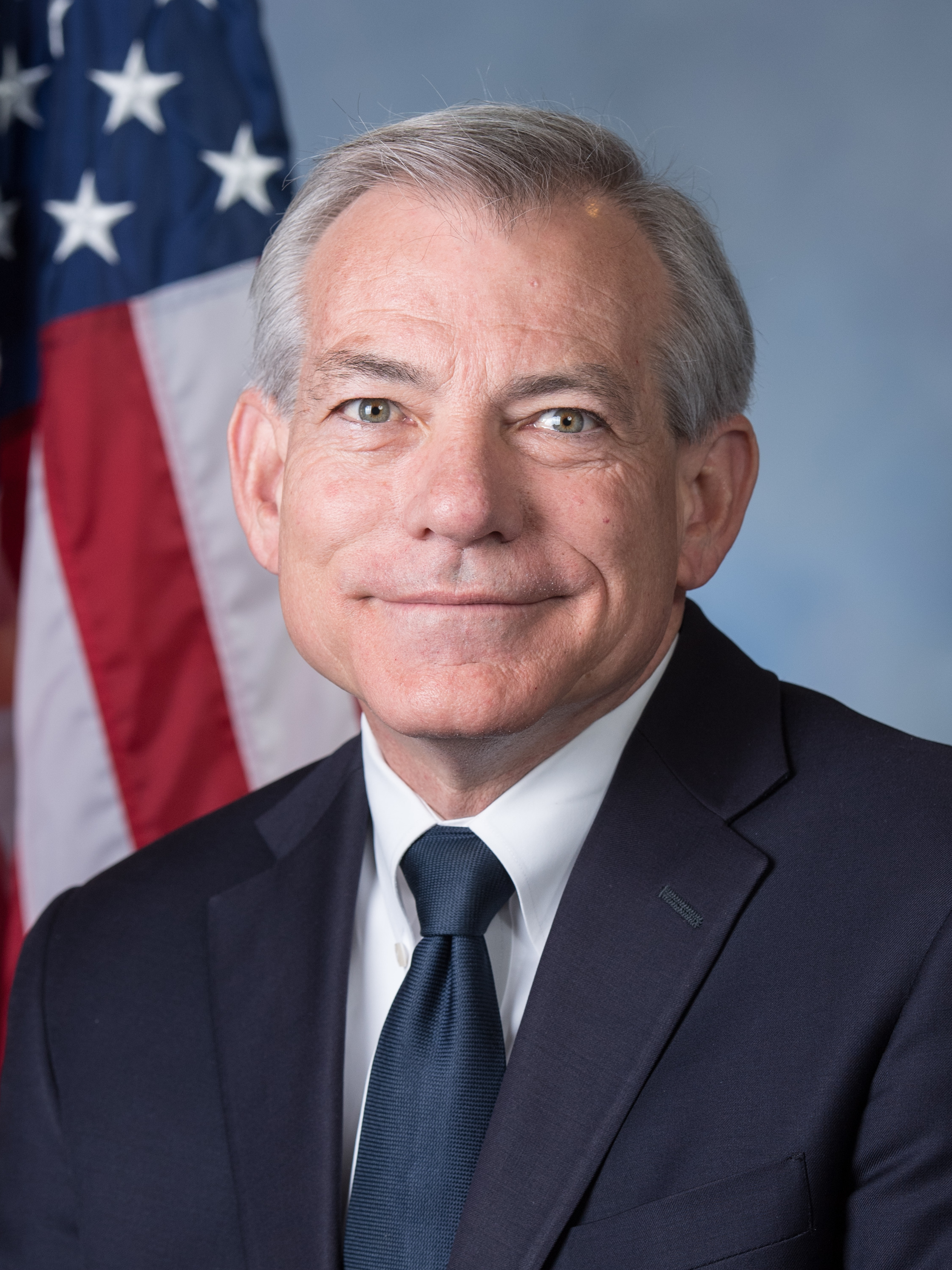

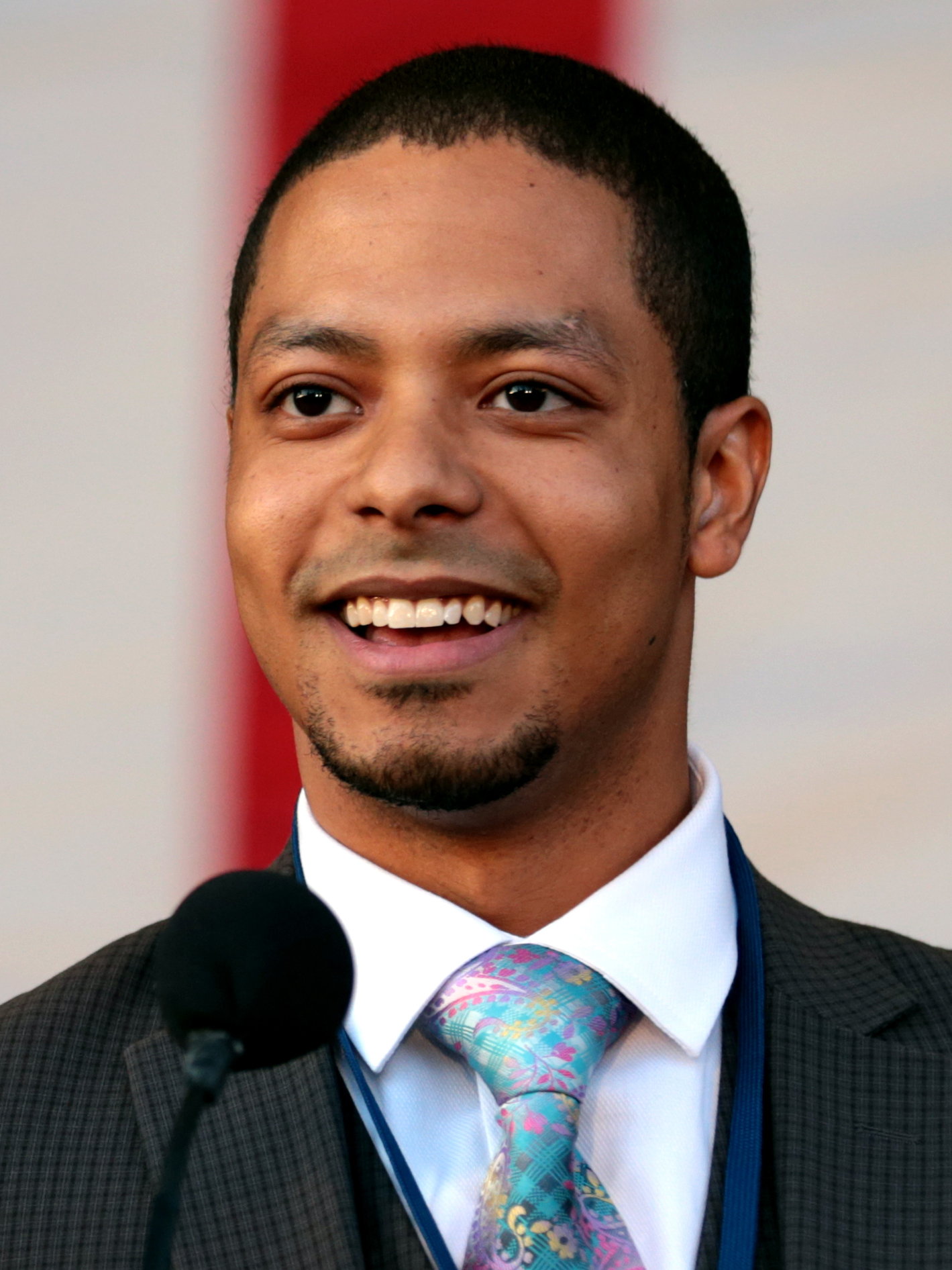
Nominee	David Schweikert	Jevin Hodge
Party	Republican	Democratic
Popular vote	182,336	179,141
Percentage	50.44%	49.56%
- Schweikert: 50–60% 60–70% 70–80% 80–90% >90% Hodge: 50–60% 60–70% 70–80%
U.S. Representative before election
David Schweikert
Republican
Elected U.S. Representative
David Schweikert
Republican

The incumbent was Republican David Schweikert, who was re-elected in Arizona's 6th congressional district with 52.2% of the vote in 2020. The district contains much of the northeast suburbs of Phoenix. It is similar in composition and structure to the old 6th district, though it is more competitive and slightly larger; in addition, the district now contains central Phoenix and most of the downtown area. Schweikert narrowly defeated Democrat Jevin Hodge in what proved to be the year's closest House race in the state.

=== Republican primary ===
==== Candidates ====
===== Nominee =====
- David Schweikert, incumbent U.S. representative for 6th district

===== Eliminated in primary =====
- Josh Barnett, nominee for the 7th district in 2020
- Elijah Norton, businessman

===== Failed to qualify =====
- Mavrick Moser, conservative activist

===== Declined =====
- Christina Smith

==== Endorsements ====
David Schweikert

Organizations

- Republican Jewish Coalition PAC

==== Results ====
Republican primary results by precinct: Schweikert: 30–40%; 40–50%; 50–60%; 60–70%; 90–100%; Norton: 30–40%; 40–50%; 50–60%; 90–100%; Barnett: 30–40%; 40–50%; Tie: 30–40%

Republican primary results
Party	Candidate	Votes	%
Republican	David Schweikert (incumbent)	52,067	43.6
Republican	Elijah Norton	39,435	33.0
Republican	Josh Barnett	27,999	23.4
Total votes		119,501	100.0

=== Democratic primary ===
==== Candidates ====
===== Nominee =====
- Jevin Hodge, Vice Chair of the Arizona Democratic Party and candidate for the Maricopa County Board of Supervisors in 2020

===== Eliminated in primary =====
- Adam Metzendorf, former director of membership experience for the Phoenix Suns, the Phoenix Mercury, and the Arizona Rattlers

===== Withdrew =====
- Ginger Sykes Torres, environmental consultant and community activist

===== Failed to qualify =====
- Delina DiSanto, registered nurse (write-in)
- Eric Ulis, crime historian
- John Williamson

==== Endorsements ====
Jevin Hodge

Organizations

- Democracy for America
- Equality Arizona
- League of Conservation Voters
- Sierra Club

=== Debate ===
2022 Arizona's 1st congressional district Democratic primary debate
No.	Date	Host	Moderator	Link	Democratic	Democratic
Key: P Participant A Absent N Not invited I Invited W Withdrawn						
Key: P Participant A Absent N Not invited I Invited W Withdrawn					Jevin Hodge	Adam Metzendorf
1	May 4, 2022	KAET; The Arizona Republic	Stacey Barchenger; Ted Simons		P	P

==== Results ====
Democratic primary results
Party	Candidate	Votes	%
Democratic	Jevin Hodge	46,144	61.9
Democratic	Adam Metzendorf	28,267	37.9
Democratic	Delina DiSanto (write-in)	175	0.2
Total votes		74,586	100.0

=== General election ===
==== Predictions ====
Source	Ranking	As of
The Cook Political Report	Tossup	October 25, 2022
Inside Elections	Lean R	October 21, 2022
Sabato's Crystal Ball	Lean R	October 26, 2022
Politico	Lean R	October 26, 2022
RCP	Lean R	October 26, 2022
Fox News	Lean R	October 25, 2022
DDHQ	Likely R	October 26, 2022
FiveThirtyEight	Solid R	November 2, 2022
The Economist	Lean R	October 16, 2022

==== Polling ====
Poll source	Date(s) administered	Sample size (Note: Key: A – all adults RV – registered voters LV – likely voters V – unclear)	Margin of error	David Schweikert (R)	Jevin Hodge (D)	Undecided
Normington Petts (D) (Note: This poll was sponsored by Hodge's campaign)	August 15–18, 2022	500 (LV)	± 4.4%	47%	47%	6%

==== Results ====
2022 Arizona's 1st congressional district election
Party	Candidate	Votes	%
Republican	David Schweikert (incumbent)	182,336	50.44%
Democratic	Jevin Hodge	179,141	49.56%
Total votes		361,477	100.00%
Republican hold			

== District 2 ==
2022 Arizona's 2nd congressional district election
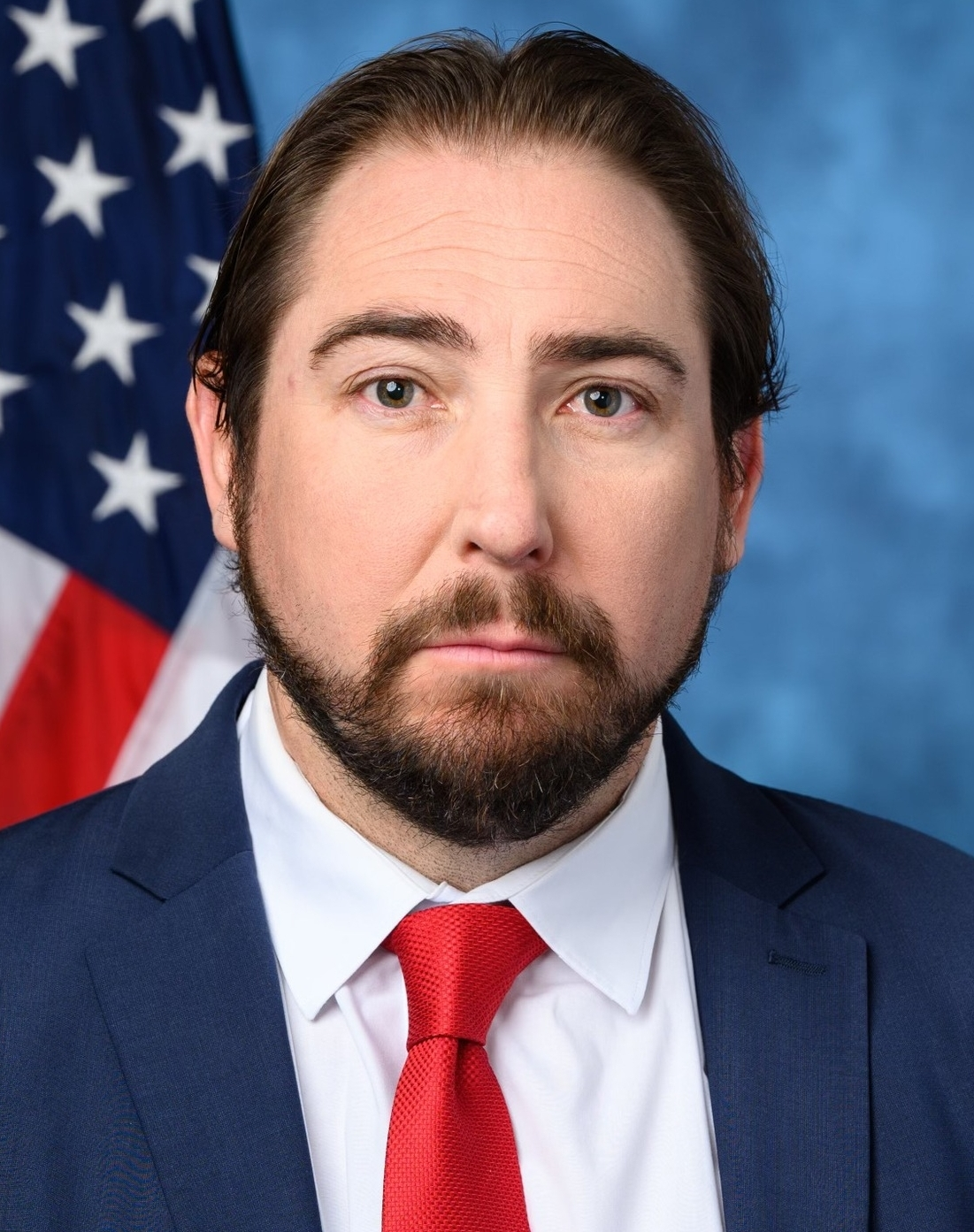

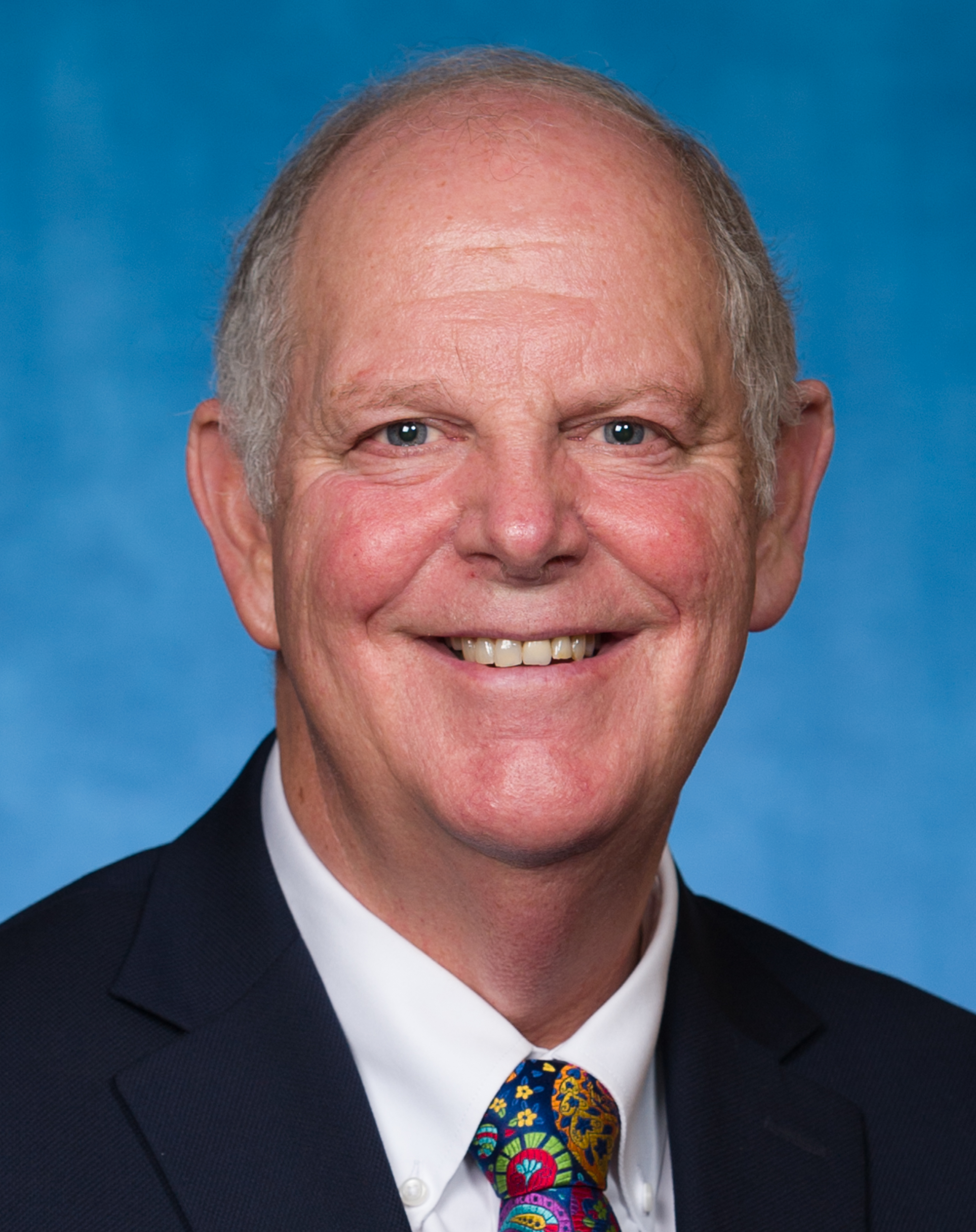
Nominee	Eli Crane	Tom O'Halleran
Party	Republican	Democratic
Popular vote	174,169	149,151
Percentage	53.86%	46.12%
- O'Halleran: 40–50% 50–60% 60–70% 70–80% 80–90% ≥90% Crane: 40–50% 50–60% 60–70% 70–80% 80–90% ≥90% Tie: 40–50% No votes
U.S. Representative before election
Tom O'Halleran
Democratic
Elected U.S. Representative
Eli Crane
Republican

The incumbent was Democrat Tom O'Halleran, who was re-elected in Arizona's 1st congressional district with 51.6% of the vote in 2020. Redistricting made the seat considerably more Republican. (Note: According to FiveThirtyEight, it now has a partisan lean of R+15, compared to its previous R+6.) O'Halleran ran for re-election and lost to Republican businessman Eli Crane.

=== Democratic primary ===
==== Candidates ====
===== Nominee =====
- Tom O'Halleran, incumbent U.S. representative and Co-Chair of the Blue Dog Coalition

===== Withdrawn =====
- Judy Stahl, candidate for Arizona's 1st legislative district in 2020 (endorsed O'Halleran)

==== Endorsements ====
Tom O'Halleran

Organizations

- American Israel Public Affairs Committee
- Equality Arizona
- Feminist Majority PAC
- Humane Society of the United States Legislative Fund
- League of Conservation Voters
- NARAL Pro-Choice America
- Natural Resources Defense Council
- Planned Parenthood Action Fund
- Renew America Movement
- Sierra Club

==== Results ====
Democratic primary results
Party	Candidate	Votes	%
Democratic	Tom O'Halleran (incumbent)	71,391	100.0
Total votes		71,391	100.0

=== Republican primary ===
==== Candidates ====
===== Nominee =====
- Eli Crane, businessman and former U.S. Navy SEAL

===== Eliminated in primary =====
- Walter Blackman, state representative from the 6th district
- Mark DeLuzio, business consultant
- Steven Krystofiak, farmer
- John Moore, mayor of Williams and candidate for 1st district in 2020
- Ron Watkins, far-right QAnon conspiracy theorist and former administrator of 8chan
- Andy Yates, small business owner

===== Did not file =====
- Myron Lizer, Vice President of the Navajo Nation

==== Endorsements ====
Eli Crane

U.S. executive branch officials

- Donald Trump, former president of the United States

==== Debates and forums ====
2022 AZ-02 Republican primary debates and forums
No.	Date	Host	Moderator	Link	Participants						
P Participant A Absent N Non-invitee I Invitee W Withdrawn											
P Participant A Absent N Non-invitee I Invitee W Withdrawn					Blackman	Crane	DeLuzio	Krystofiak	Moore	Watkins	Yates
1	April 27, 2022	Arizona PBS	Ted Simons		P	A	A	A	A	P	P

==== Polling ====
Poll source	Date(s) administered	Sample size	Margin of error	Walter Blackman	Eli Crane	Mark DeLuzio	Steven Krystofiak	John Moore	Ron Watkins	Andy Yates	Undecided
Moore Information Group (R) (Note: This poll was sponsored by Crane's campaign)	July 13, 2022	250 (LV)	± 6.2%	12%	19%	12%	1%	5%	<1%	3%	48%
co/efficient (R) (Note: This poll was sponsored by Blackman's campaign)	June 14–16, 2022	605 (LV)	± 4.0%	26%	5%	2%	1%	2%	1%	1%	62%

==== Results ====
Results by county: Crane: 30–40%; 40–50%; Blackman: 30–40%; 40–50%; Tie: 20-30%

Republican primary results
Party	Candidate	Votes	%
Republican	Eli Crane	38,681	35.8
Republican	Walter Blackman	26,399	24.4
Republican	Mark DeLuzio	18,515	17.1
Republican	Andy Yates	7,467	6.9
Republican	John Moore	7,327	6.8
Republican	Steven Krystofiak	5,905	5.5
Republican	Ron Watkins	3,810	3.5
Total votes		108,104	100.0

=== General election ===
==== Predictions ====
Source	Ranking	As of
The Cook Political Report	Lean R (flip)	October 25, 2022
Inside Elections	Lean R (flip)	October 21, 2022
Sabato's Crystal Ball	Lean R (flip)	October 26, 2022
Politico	Lean R (flip)	October 26, 2022
RCP	Likely R (flip)	October 26, 2022
Fox News	Lean R (flip)	October 25, 2022
DDHQ	Lean R (flip)	October 26, 2022
FiveThirtyEight	Lean R (flip)	October 26, 2022
The Economist	Likely R (flip)	November 1, 2022

==== Polling ====
Poll source	Date(s) administered	Sample size	Margin of error	Tom O'Halleran (D)	Eli Crane (R)	Undecided
Moore Information Group (R) (Note: Poll sponsored jointly by the National Republican Congressional Committee and Crane's campaign committee)	August 11–15, 2022	400 (LV)	± 5.0%	44%	45%	11%

Hypothetical polling

Generic Democrat vs. generic Republican

Poll source	Date(s) administered	Sample size	Margin of error	Generic Democrat	Generic Republican	Undecided
Moore Information Group (R)	August 11–15, 2022	400 (LV)	± 5.0%	36%	51%	13%

==== Results ====
2022 Arizona's 2nd congressional district election
Party	Candidate	Votes	%
Republican	Eli Crane	174,169	53.86%
Democratic	Tom O'Halleran (incumbent)	149,151	46.12%
Independent	Chris Sarappo (write-in)	76	0.02%
Total votes		323,396	100.00%
Republican gain from Democratic			

== District 3 ==
2022 Arizona's 3rd congressional district election
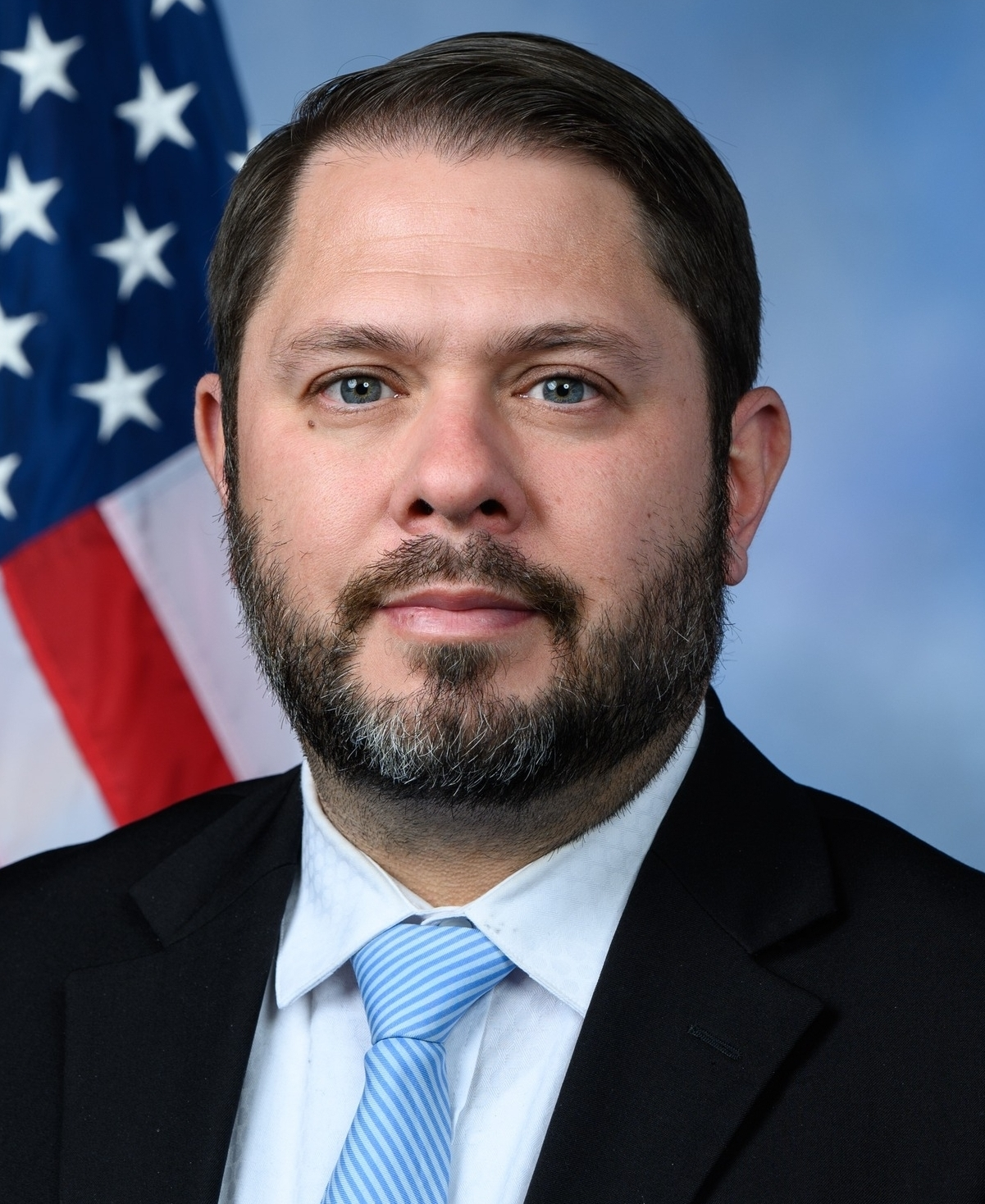

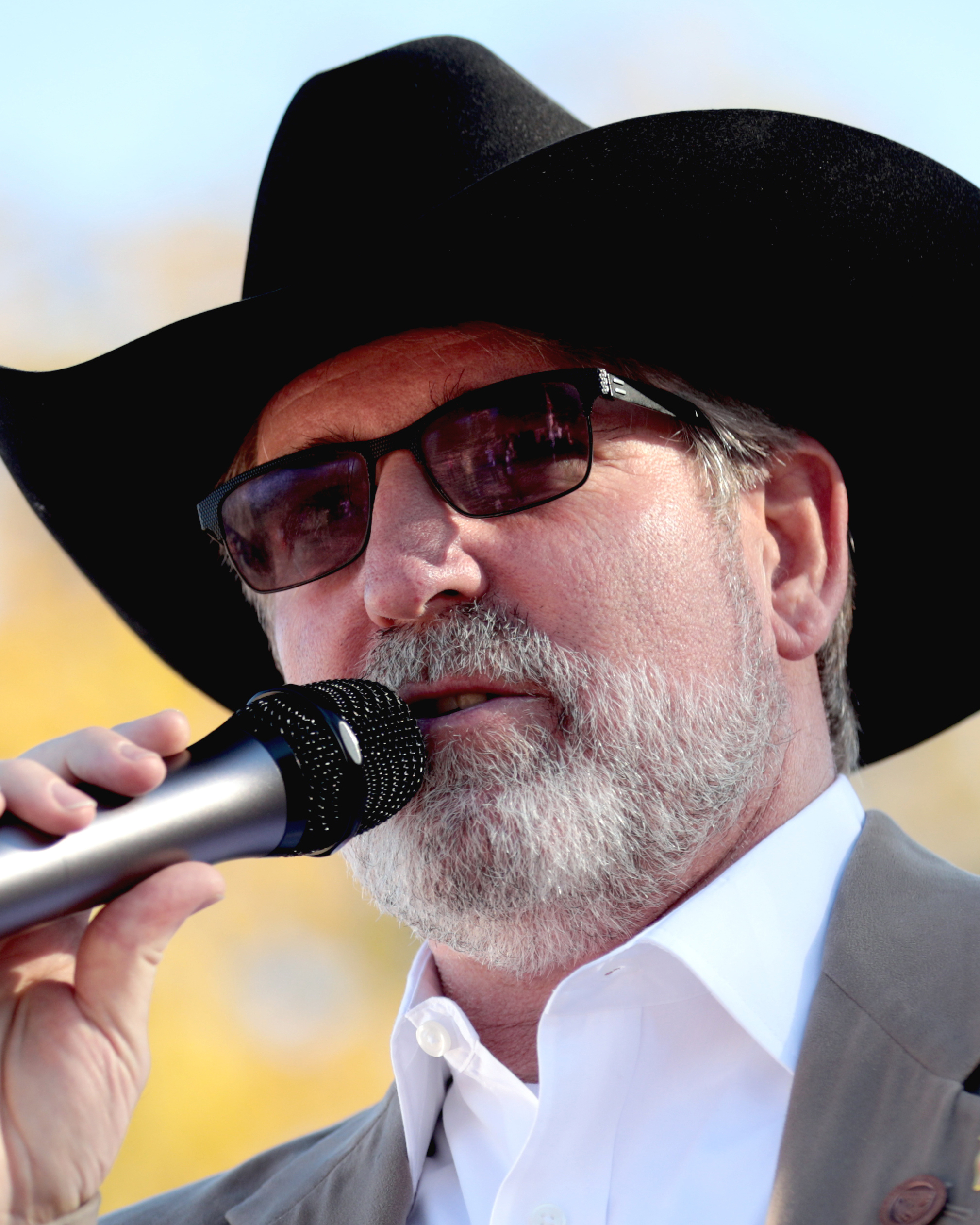
Nominee	Ruben Gallego	Jeff Zink
Party	Democratic	Republican
Popular vote	108,599	32,475
Percentage	77.0%	23.0%
- Gallego: 50–60% 60–70% 70–80% 80–90% ≥90% Tie: 50% No votes
U.S. Representative before election
Ruben Gallego
Democratic
Elected U.S. Representative
Ruben Gallego
Democratic

The incumbent was Democrat Ruben Gallego, who was re-elected in Arizona's 7th congressional district with 76.7% of the vote in 2020. The new 3rd district closely resembles the old 7th district. Gallego ran for and won re-election.

=== Democratic primary ===
==== Candidates ====
===== Nominee =====
- Ruben Gallego, incumbent U.S. representative

==== Endorsements ====
Ruben Gallego

Organizations

- Equality Arizona
- Humane Society of the United States Legislative Fund
- League of Conservation Voters
- NARAL Pro-Choice America
- Planned Parenthood Action Fund
- Sierra Club

==== Results ====
Democratic primary results
Party	Candidate	Votes	%
Democratic	Ruben Gallego (incumbent)	47,972	100.0
Total votes		47,972	100.0

=== Republican primary ===
==== Candidates ====
===== Nominee =====
- Jeff Zink, former adjunct professor at Grand Canyon University

===== Failed to qualify =====
- Nina Becker

==== Results ====
Republican primary results
Party	Candidate	Votes	%
Republican	Jeff Zink	13,894	100.0
Total votes		13,894	100.0

=== General election ===
==== Predictions ====
Source	Ranking	As of
The Cook Political Report	Solid D	October 25, 2022
Inside Elections	Solid D	October 21, 2022
Sabato's Crystal Ball	Safe D	October 26, 2022
Politico	Solid D	October 26, 2022
RCP	Safe D	October 26, 2022
Fox News	Solid D	October 25, 2022
DDHQ	Solid D	October 26, 2022
FiveThirtyEight	Solid D	October 26, 2022
The Economist	Safe D	October 16, 2022

==== Results ====
2022 Arizona's 3rd congressional district election
Party	Candidate	Votes	%
Democratic	Ruben Gallego (incumbent)	108,599	77.0
Republican	Jeff Zink	32,475	23.0
Total votes		141,074	100.0
Democratic hold			

== District 4 ==
2022 Arizona's 4th congressional district election
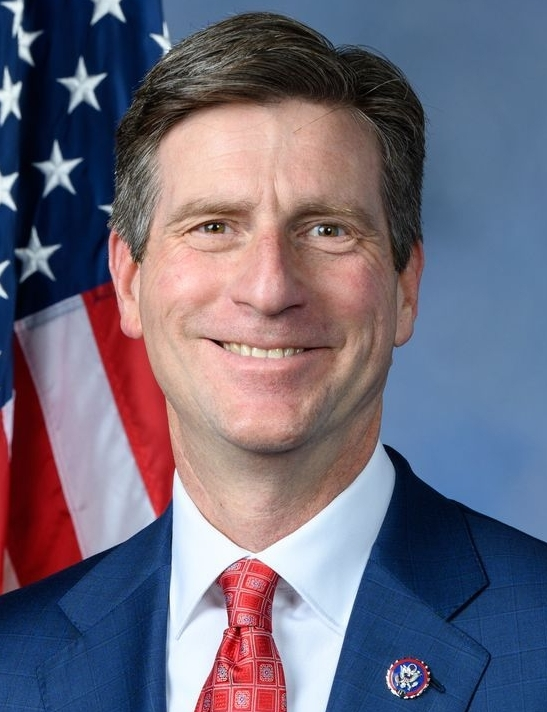

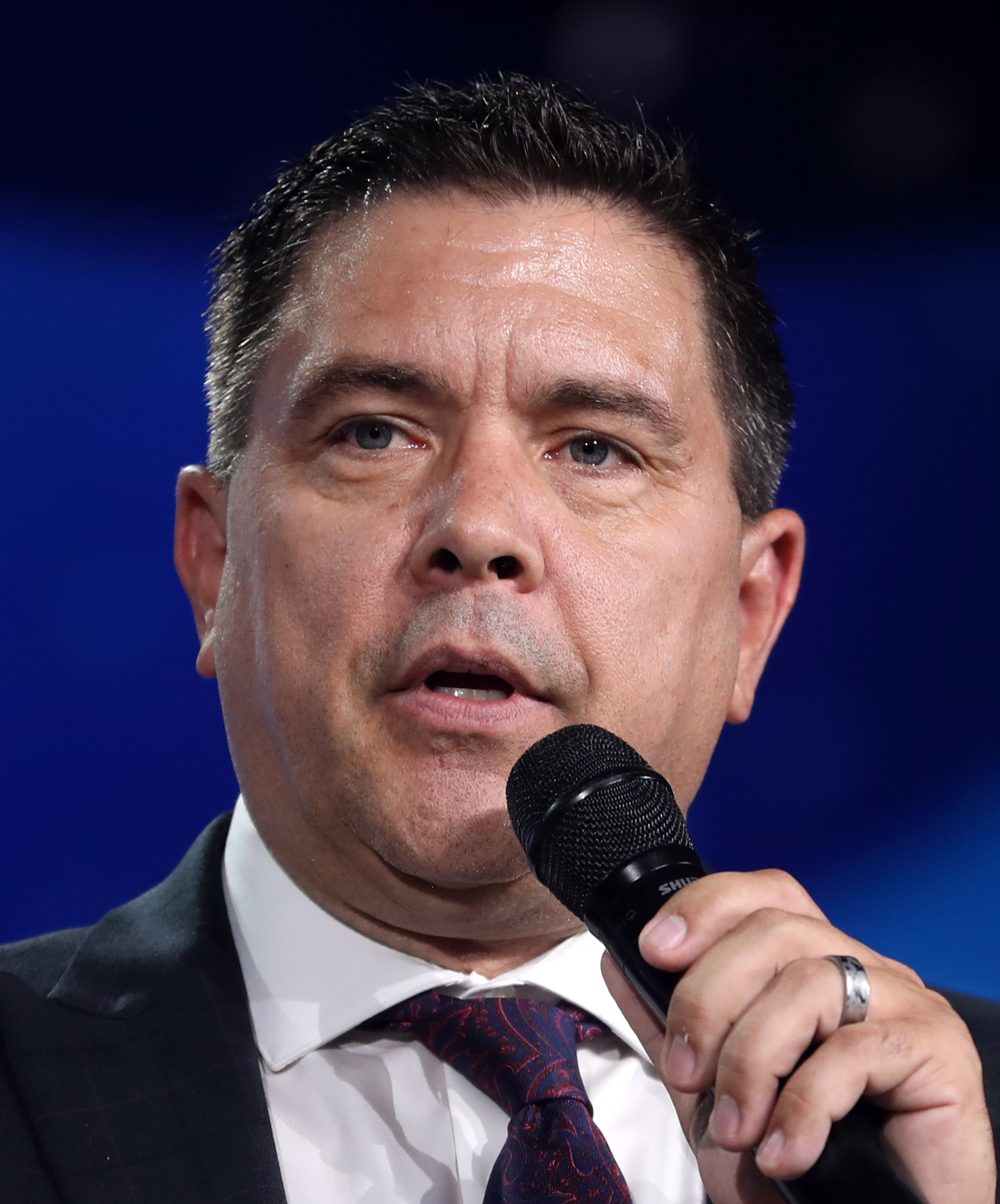
Nominee	Greg Stanton	Kelly Cooper
Party	Democratic	Republican
Popular vote	148,941	116,521
Percentage	56.1%	43.9%
- Stanton: 40–50% 50–60% 60–70% 70–80% 80–90% Cooper: 50–60% 60–70% 70–80%
U.S. Representative before election
Greg Stanton
Democratic
Elected U.S. Representative
Greg Stanton
Democratic

The incumbent was Democrat Greg Stanton, who was re-elected in Arizona's 9th congressional district with 61.6% of the vote in 2020. Whereas the 9th district contained downtown Phoenix, the new 4th district is more rural and is highly competitive. Stanton successfully ran for re-election.

=== Democratic primary ===
==== Candidates ====
===== Nominee =====
- Greg Stanton, incumbent U.S. representative

==== Endorsements ====
Greg Stanton

Local officials

- John Giles, mayor of Mesa (Republican)

Organizations

- American Israel Public Affairs Committee
- Equality Arizona
- Feminist Majority PAC
- Humane Society of the United States Legislative Fund
- League of Conservation Voters
- NARAL Pro-Choice America
- Natural Resources Defense Council
- Planned Parenthood Action Fund
- Sierra Club

==== Results ====
Democratic primary results
Party	Candidate	Votes	%
Democratic	Greg Stanton (incumbent)	61,319	100.0
Total votes		61,319	100.0

=== Republican primary ===
The Republican primary had six qualified candidates. David Giles, a perennial candidate, Tanya Contreras Wheelas, a former staffer of Arizona senator Martha McSally, and Alex Stovall, a U.S. Army veteran, were the first to announce. In December 2021, secretly recorded conversations with Stovall dismissing his constituents and "flip-flopping" on statements he had made throughout his campaign were released. Jerone Davison, a former Oakland Raiders running back and longtime pastor in Maricopa County, launched an exploratory campaign in November 2021. Also running were U.S. Navy veteran Rene Lopez, co-founder of Cece's Hope Center, which helps protect young women from sex trafficking, two-term Chandler City Councilman Rene Lopez, and largely self-funded businessman Kelly Cooper.

==== Candidates ====
===== Nominee =====
- Kelly Cooper, restaurant owner and U.S. Marine Corps veteran

===== Eliminated in primary =====
- Jerone Davison, former running back for the Las Vegas Raiders and pastor
- Dave Giles, businessman, candidate for 9th district in 2018, and nominee in 2016 and 2020
- Rene Lopez, Chandler city councilor, co-founder of Cece's Hope Center, and U.S. Navy veteran
- Tanya Contreras Wheeless, former staffer for U.S. Senator Martha McSally

===== Withdrew =====
- Jana Jackson, professor and aerospace education specialist
- Orlando Johnson
- Tony Montanarella, ex-police officer and U.S. Marine Corps veteran
- Justin Musgrove, loan officer
- Saul A. Rodriguez
- Alex Stovall, U.S. Army veteran

==== Endorsements ====
Tanya Wheeless

Organizations

- Maggie's List
Kelly Cooper

U.S. executive branch officials

- Donald Trump, former president of the United States

Organizations

- Tea Party Express

==== Debates and forums ====
2022 AZ-04 Republican primary debates and forums
No.	Date	Host	Moderator	Link	Participants				
P Participant A Absent N Non-invitee I Invitee W Withdrawn									
P Participant A Absent N Non-invitee I Invitee W Withdrawn					Lopez	Davison	Wheeless	Giles	Cooper
1	May 9, 2022	Arizona PBS	Ted Simons		P	P	A	P	A

==== Results ====
Republican primary results by precinct: Cooper: 20–30%; 30–40%; 40–50%; Wheeless: 20–30%; 30–40%; 40–50%; Giles: 20–30%; 30–40%; Davison: 20–30%; Tie: 20–30%

Republican primary results
Party	Candidate	Votes	%
Republican	Kelly Cooper	20,281	28.4
Republican	Tanya Contreras Wheeless	18,166	25.4
Republican	Dave Giles	13,348	18.7
Republican	Rene Lopez	10,149	14.2
Republican	Jerone Davison	9,502	13.3
Total votes		71,446	100.0

=== General election ===
==== Predictions ====
Source	Ranking	As of
The Cook Political Report	Likely D	October 25, 2022
Inside Elections	Likely D	October 21, 2022
Sabato's Crystal Ball	Lean D	October 26, 2022
Politico	Lean D	October 26, 2022
RCP	Tossup	October 26, 2022
Fox News	Lean D	November 1, 2022
DDHQ	Likely D	October 26, 2022
FiveThirtyEight	Likely D	October 26, 2022
The Economist	Likely D	October 16, 2022

==== Polling ====
Poll source	Date(s) administered	Sample size	Margin of error	Greg Stanton (D)	Kelly Cooper (R)	Other	Undecided
RMG Research	August 10–15, 2022	400 (LV)	± 4.9%	46%	39%	4%	11%

==== Results ====
2022 Arizona's 4th congressional district election
Party	Candidate	Votes	%
Democratic	Greg Stanton (incumbent)	148,941	56.1
Republican	Kelly Cooper	116,521	43.9
Independent	Stephan Jones (write-in)	36	0.0
Total votes		265,498	100.0
Democratic hold			

== District 5 ==
2022 Arizona's 5th congressional district election
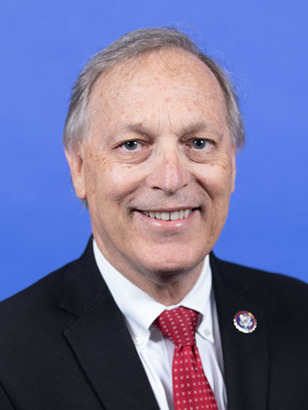

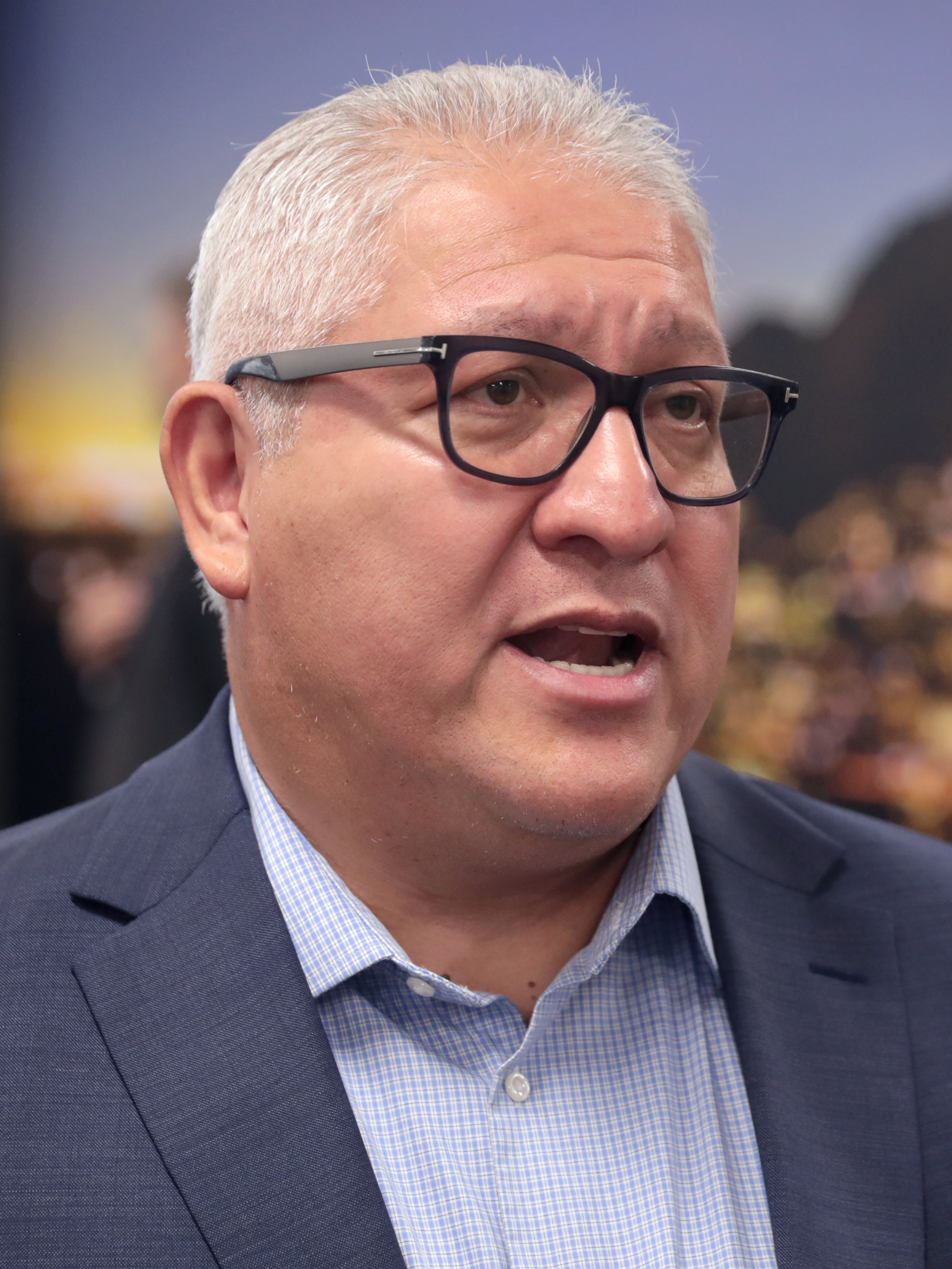

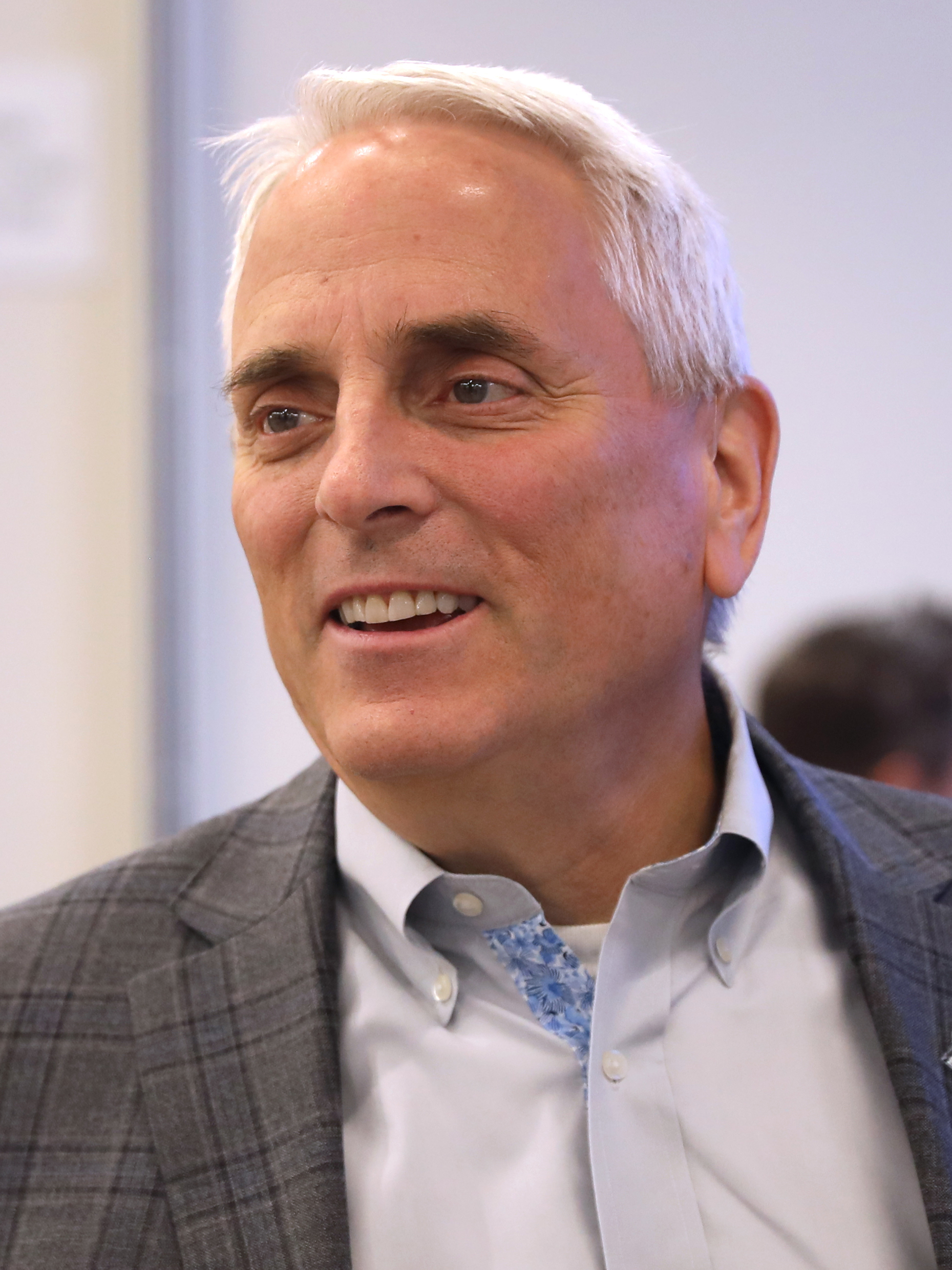
Nominee	Andy Biggs	Javier Ramos	Clint Smith
Party	Republican	Democratic	Independent
Popular vote	182,464	120,243	18,851
Percentage	56.7%	37.4%	5.9%
- Biggs: 40–50% 50–60% 60–70% 70–80% Ramos: 40–50% 50–60%
U.S. Representative before election
Andy Biggs
Republican
Elected U.S. Representative
Andy Biggs
Republican

The incumbent was Republican Andy Biggs, who was re-elected with 58.9% of the vote in 2020. The new 5th district is slightly smaller than its predecessor, but is still not competitive. Biggs ran for re-election.

=== Republican primary ===
==== Candidates ====
===== Nominee =====
- Andy Biggs, incumbent U.S. representative

==== Endorsements ====
Andy Biggs

Organizations

- Turning Point Action

==== Results ====
Republican primary results
Party	Candidate	Votes	%
Republican	Andy Biggs (incumbent)	98,114	99.5
Write-in		456	0.5
Total votes		98,570	100.0

=== Democratic primary ===
==== Candidates ====
===== Nominee =====
- Javier Ramos, attorney and candidate for this seat in 2020

===== Failed to qualify =====
- Ben Larivee, U.S. Marine Corps veteran

==== Results ====
Democratic primary results
Party	Candidate	Votes	%
Democratic	Javier Ramos	50,647	100.0
Total votes		50,647	100.0

=== Independents ===
==== Declared ====
- Clint Smith, attorney

==== Endorsements ====
Clint Smith

Organizations

- Forward Party
- Renew America Movement

=== General election ===
==== Debates and forums ====
2022 Arizona's 5th congressional district general election debates and forums
No.	Date	Host	Moderator	Link	Participants		
P Participant A Absent N Non-invitee I Invitee W Withdrawn							
P Participant A Absent N Non-invitee I Invitee W Withdrawn					Biggs	Ramos	Smith
1	September 21, 2022	Arizona PBS	Ted Simons		A	P	P

==== Predictions ====
Source	Ranking	As of
The Cook Political Report	Solid R	October 25, 2022
Inside Elections	Solid R	October 21, 2022
Sabato's Crystal Ball	Safe R	October 26, 2022
Politico	Solid R	October 26, 2022
RCP	Safe R	October 26, 2022
Fox News	Solid R	October 25, 2022
DDHQ	Solid R	October 26, 2022
FiveThirtyEight	Solid R	October 26, 2022
The Economist	Safe R	October 16, 2022

==== Results ====
2022 Arizona's 5th congressional district election
Party	Candidate	Votes	%
Republican	Andy Biggs (incumbent)	182,464	56.7
Democratic	Javier Ramos	120,243	37.4
Independent	Clint Smith	18,851	5.9
Democratic	Debra Jo Borden (write-in)	32	0.0
Total votes		321,590	100.0
Republican hold			

== District 6 ==
2022 Arizona's 6th congressional district election
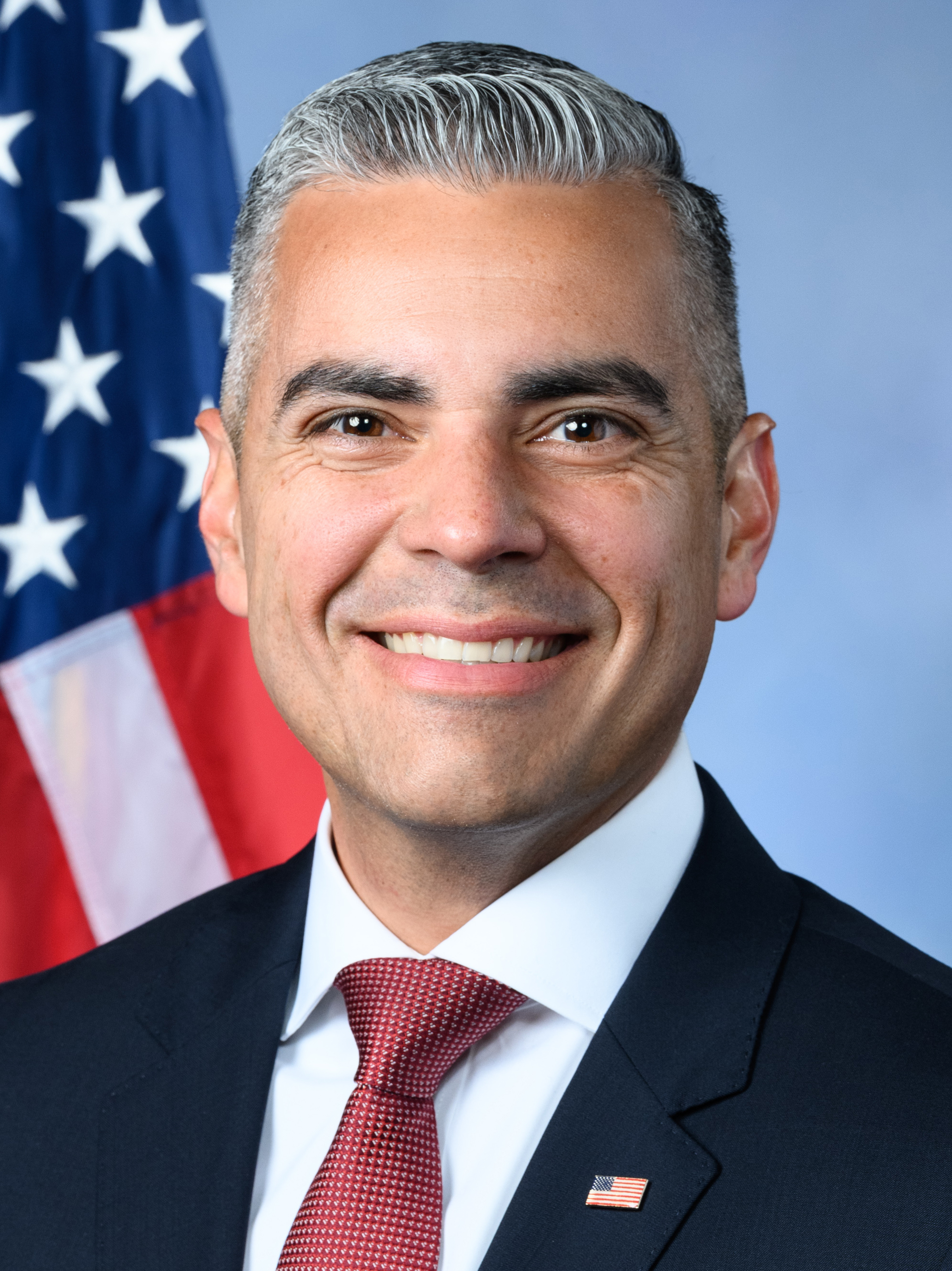

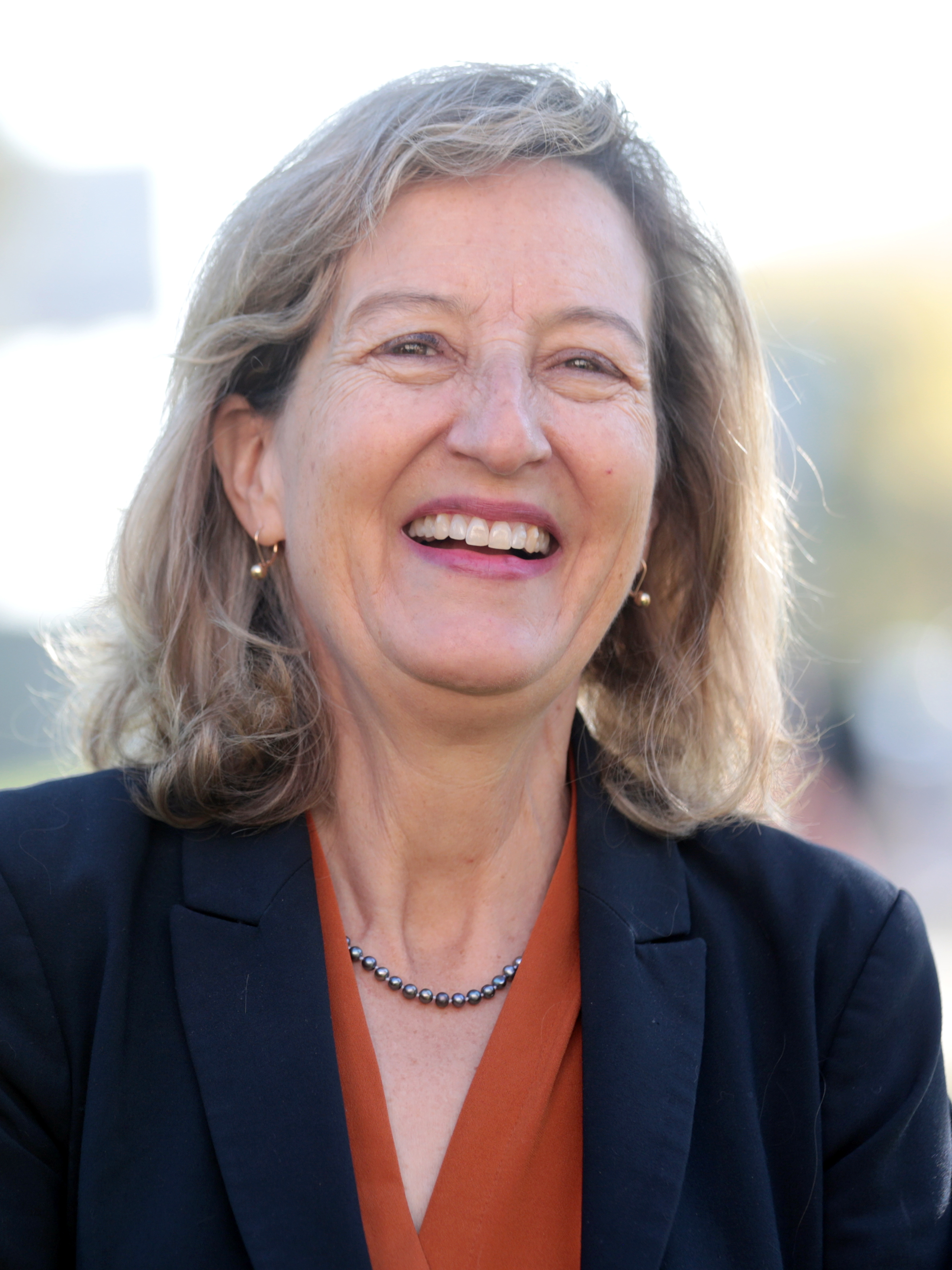
Nominee	Juan Ciscomani	Kirsten Engel
Party	Republican	Democratic
Popular vote	177,201	171,969
Percentage	50.73%	49.23%
- Ciscomani: 50–60% 60–70% 70–80% 80–90% >90% Engel: 50–60% 60–70% 70–80% 80–90% No votes
U.S. Representative before election
Ann Kirkpatrick
Democratic
Elected U.S. Representative
Juan Ciscomani
Republican

The incumbent was Democrat Ann Kirkpatrick, who was re-elected in Arizona's 2nd congressional district with 55.1% of the vote in 2020. She did not run for re-election. The new 6th district covers the Southeast corner of the state, with many heavily Democratic parts being absorbed into the 7th district.

=== Democratic primary ===
==== Candidates ====
===== Nominee =====
- Kirsten Engel, former state senator and former state representative from the 10th district

===== Eliminated in primary =====
- Avery Anderson, engineer
- Daniel Hernández Jr., state representative from the 2nd district

===== Failed to qualify =====
- Marcos Urrea, legal assistant to Immigration Equality

===== Withdrew =====
- Randy Friese, state representative from the 9th district

===== Declined =====
- Ann Kirkpatrick, incumbent U.S. representative

==== Fundraising ====
Friese led early fundraising, followed by Engel, followed by Hernández.

==== Endorsements ====
Kirsten Engel

U.S. representatives

- Ron Barber, former U.S. representative from Arizona's 2nd congressional district
- Raúl Grijalva, U.S. representative from Arizona's 3rd congressional district
- Ann Kirkpatrick, U.S. representative from Arizona's 2nd congressional district
- Annie Kuster, U.S. representative from New Hampshire's 2nd congressional district

Local officials

- Regina Romero, mayor of Tucson
- Jonathan Rothschild, former mayor of Tucson

Organizations

- Climate Hawks Vote
- EMILY's List
- Equality Arizona
- League of Conservation Voters
- Sierra Club
- NARAL Pro-Choice America (post-primary)
- National Women's Political Caucus
Randy Friese (withdrawn)

Organizations

- 314 Action
- VoteVets
Daniel Hernandez

U.S. representatives

- David Cicilline, U.S. representative from Rhode Island's 1st congressional district
- Adriano Espaillat, U.S. representative from New York's 13th congressional district
- Ruben Gallego, U.S. representative from Arizona's 7th congressional district
- Mark Takano, U.S. representative from California's 41st congressional district
- Norma Torres, U.S. representative from California's 35th congressional district
- Ritchie Torres, U.S. representative from New York's 15th congressional district

State legislators

- Alma Hernandez, state representative from the 3rd district (Hernandez's sister)

Individuals

- Luis A. Miranda Jr., political strategist, philanthropist, and advocacy consultant
- Chuck Rocha, Democratic Party strategist and former union organizer

Labor unions

- Arizona Teachers Federation
- Laborers' International Union of North America Local 1184

Organizations

- BOLD PAC
- Democratic Majority for Israel
- Equality PAC
- Everytown for Gun Safety Action Fund
- Human Rights Campaign PAC
- Latino Victory Fund
- LGBTQ Victory Fund
- Pro-Israel America

==== Debates and forums ====
2022 AZ-06 Democratic primary debates and forums
No.	Date	Host	Moderator	Link	Participants		
P Participant A Absent N Non-invitee I Invitee W Withdrawn							
P Participant A Absent N Non-invitee I Invitee W Withdrawn					Anderson	Engel	Hernández
1	May 18, 2022	Arizona PBS	Ted Simons & Mary Jo Pitzl		A	P	P

==== Polling ====
Poll source	Date(s) administered	Sample size	Margin of error	Avery Anderson	Kirsten Engel	Daniel Hernández Jr.	Undecided
Impact Research (D) (Note: This poll was sponsored by Hernández's campaign)	May 3–8, 2022	500 (LV)	± 4.4%	2%	20%	36%	42%

==== Results ====
Results by county: Engel: 50–60%; Hernández Jr.: 50–60%

Democratic primary results
Party	Candidate	Votes	%
Democratic	Kirsten Engel	54,060	59.1
Democratic	Daniel Hernandez Jr.	31,815	34.8
Democratic	Avery Anderson	5,639	6.2
Total votes		91,514	100.0

=== Republican primary ===
==== Candidates ====
===== Nominee =====
- Juan Ciscomani, senior advisor to Governor Doug Ducey and vice chair of the Arizona-Mexico Commission

===== Eliminated in primary =====
- Lucretia Free, founder and publisher of the Vail Voice
- Brandon Martin, U.S. Army veteran, candidate for Arizona's 2nd congressional district in 2018 and nominee in 2020
- Young Mayberry, teacher and farmer
- Kathleen Winn, former local television reporter

===== Withdrew =====
- Douglas Lowell, surgeon
- Marissa Mitchell
- Kelly Townsend, state senator from the 16th district

==== Endorsements ====
Juan Ciscomani

U.S. representatives

- Kevin McCarthy, U.S. representative for California's 23rd congressional district and House Minority Leader

Organizations

- Congressional Leadership Fund
- Tea Party Express

==== Debates and forums ====
2022 AZ-06 Republican primary debates and forums
No.	Date	Host	Moderator	Link	Participants				
P Participant A Absent N Non-invitee I Invitee W Withdrawn									
P Participant A Absent N Non-invitee I Invitee W Withdrawn					Winn	Free	Martin	Mayberry	Ciscomani
1	May 16, 2022	Arizona PBS	Ted Simons & Mary Jo Pitzl		P	P	P	P	A

==== Results ====
Results by county: Ciscomani: 30–40%; 40–50%

Republican primary results
Party	Candidate	Votes	%
Republican	Juan Ciscomani	49,559	47.1
Republican	Brandon Martin	21,987	20.9
Republican	Kathleen Winn	19,635	18.7
Republican	Young Mayberry	8,942	8.5
Republican	Lucretia Free	5,029	4.8
Republican	Jordan Flayer (write-in)	32	0.0
Total votes		105,184	100.0

=== General election ===
==== Predictions ====
Source	Ranking	As of
The Cook Political Report	Lean R (flip)	October 25, 2022
Inside Elections	Tilt R (flip)	October 21, 2022
Sabato's Crystal Ball	Lean R (flip)	October 26, 2022
Politico	Lean R (flip)	October 26, 2022
RCP	Lean R (flip)	October 26, 2022
Fox News	Lean R (flip)	October 25, 2022
DDHQ	Likely R (flip)	October 26, 2022
FiveThirtyEight	Likely R (flip)	October 26, 2022
The Economist	Lean R (flip)	October 16, 2022

==== Debates and forums ====
2022 Arizona's 6th congressional district general election debates and forums
No.	Date	Host	Moderator	Link	Participants	
P Participant A Absent N Non-invitee I Invitee W Withdrawn						
P Participant A Absent N Non-invitee I Invitee W Withdrawn					Ciscomani	Engel
1	September 22, 2022	Casa Grande Valley Newspapers Inc.	Donovan Kramer		P	A

==== Polling ====
Poll source	Date(s) administered	Sample size	Margin of error	Kirsten Engel (D)	Juan Ciscomani (R)	Undecided
GQR Research (D) (Note: This poll was sponsored by Engel's campaign)	August 16–21, 2022	500 (LV)	± 4.4%	49%	47%	4%

==== Results ====
2022 Arizona's 6th congressional district election
Party	Candidate	Votes	%
Republican	Juan Ciscomani	177,201	50.73%
Democratic	Kirsten Engel	171,969	49.23%
Democratic	Avery Alexander Thornton (write-in)	71	0.02%
Independent	Frank Bertone (write-in)	42	0.01%
Total votes		349,283	100.00%
Republican gain from Democratic			

== District 7 ==
2022 Arizona's 7th congressional district election
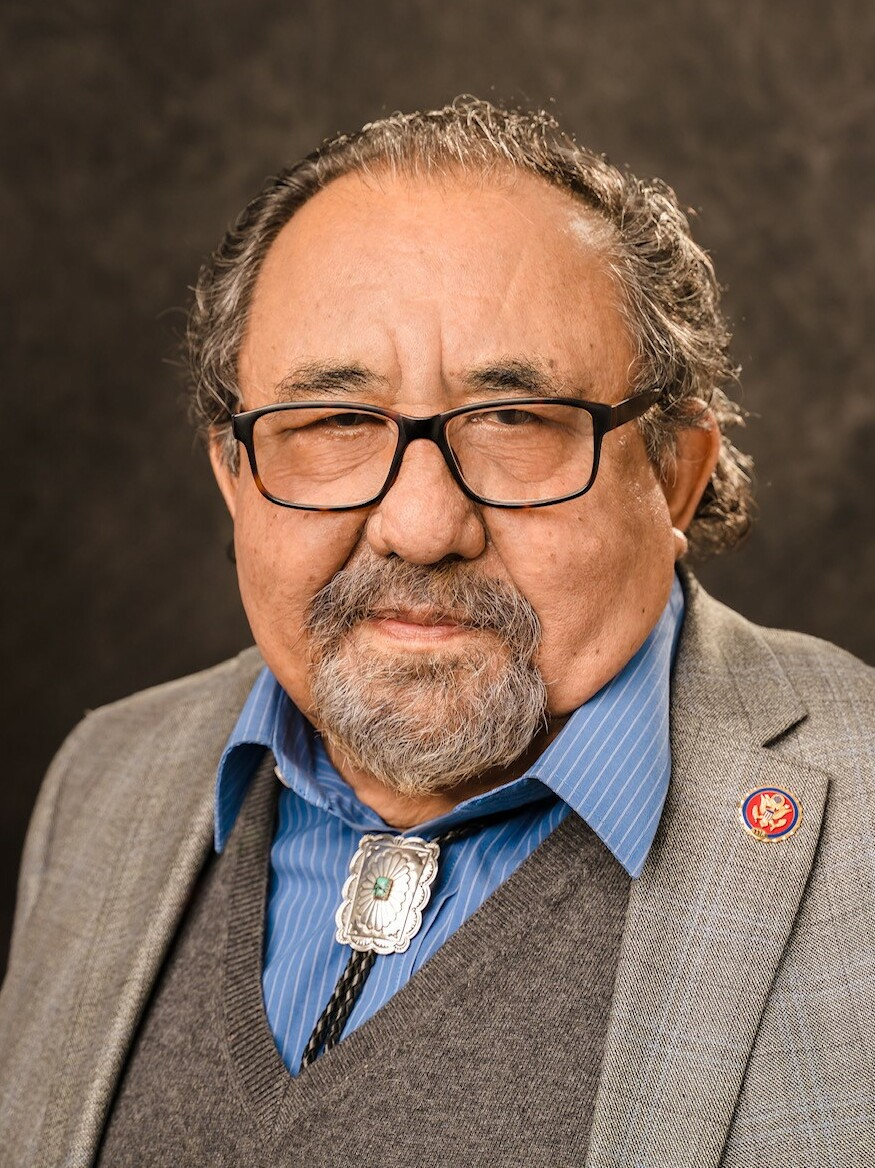

Nominee	Raúl Grijalva	Luis Pozzolo
Party	Democratic	Republican
Popular vote	126,418	69,444
Percentage	64.5%	35.5%
- Grijalva: 50–60% 60–70% 70–80% 80–90% >90% Pozzolo: 50–60% 60–70% 70–80% 80–90% No votes
U.S. Representative before election
Raúl Grijalva
Democratic
Elected U.S. Representative
Raúl Grijalva
Democratic

The incumbent was Democrat Raúl Grijalva, who was re-elected in Arizona's 3rd congressional district with 63.9% of the vote in 2020. The district is very similar to its predecessor, but it covers more of the Mexico–United States border. Redistricting made the district less competitive. Grijalva ran for re-election and the Republican nominee, naturalized citizen and Uruguayan immigrant Luis Pozzolo, competed against him.

=== Democratic primary ===
==== Candidates ====
===== Nominee =====
- Raúl Grijalva, incumbent U.S. representative

==== Endorsements ====
Raúl Grijalva

Organizations

- Feminist Majority PAC
- Humane Society of the United States Legislative Fund
- Justice Democrats
- League of Conservation Voters
- Natural Resources Defense Council
- Planned Parenthood Action Fund
- Progressive Democrats of America
- Sierra Club

==== Results ====
Democratic primary results
Party	Candidate	Votes	%
Democratic	Raúl Grijalva (incumbent)	62,547	100.0
Total votes		62,547	100.0

=== Republican primary ===
==== Candidates ====
===== Nominee =====
- Luis Pozzolo, Uruguayan immigrant and small business owner

===== Eliminated in primary =====
- Nina Becker, business consultant

==== Withdrew ====
- Joshua Pembleton, former Green Beret
- Daniel Wood, U.S. Marine Corps veteran and nominee for 3rd district in 2020

==== Results ====
Republican primary results
Party	Candidate	Votes	%
Republican	Luis Pozzolo	20,413	69.0
Republican	Nina Becker	9,064	30.6
Republican	David Reetz (write-in)	103	0.4
Total votes		29,580	100.0

=== General election ===
==== Predictions ====
Source	Ranking	As of
The Cook Political Report	Solid D	October 25, 2022
Inside Elections	Solid D	October 21, 2022
Sabato's Crystal Ball	Safe D	October 26, 2022
Politico	Solid D	October 26, 2022
RCP	Safe D	October 26, 2022
Fox News	Solid D	October 25, 2022
DDHQ	Solid D	October 26, 2022
FiveThirtyEight	Solid D	October 26, 2022
The Economist	Safe D	October 16, 2022

==== Debates and forums ====
2022 Arizona's 7th congressional district general election debates and forums
No.	Date	Host	Moderator	Link	Participants	
P Participant A Absent N Non-invitee I Invitee W Withdrawn						
P Participant A Absent N Non-invitee I Invitee W Withdrawn					Grijalva	Pozzolo
1	September 26, 2022	Arizona PBS	Ted Simons		P	P

==== Results ====
2022 Arizona's 7th congressional district election
Party	Candidate	Votes	%
Democratic	Raúl Grijalva (incumbent)	126,418	64.5
Republican	Luis Pozzolo	69,444	35.5
Total votes		195,862	100.0
Democratic hold			

== District 8 ==
2022 Arizona's 8th congressional district election
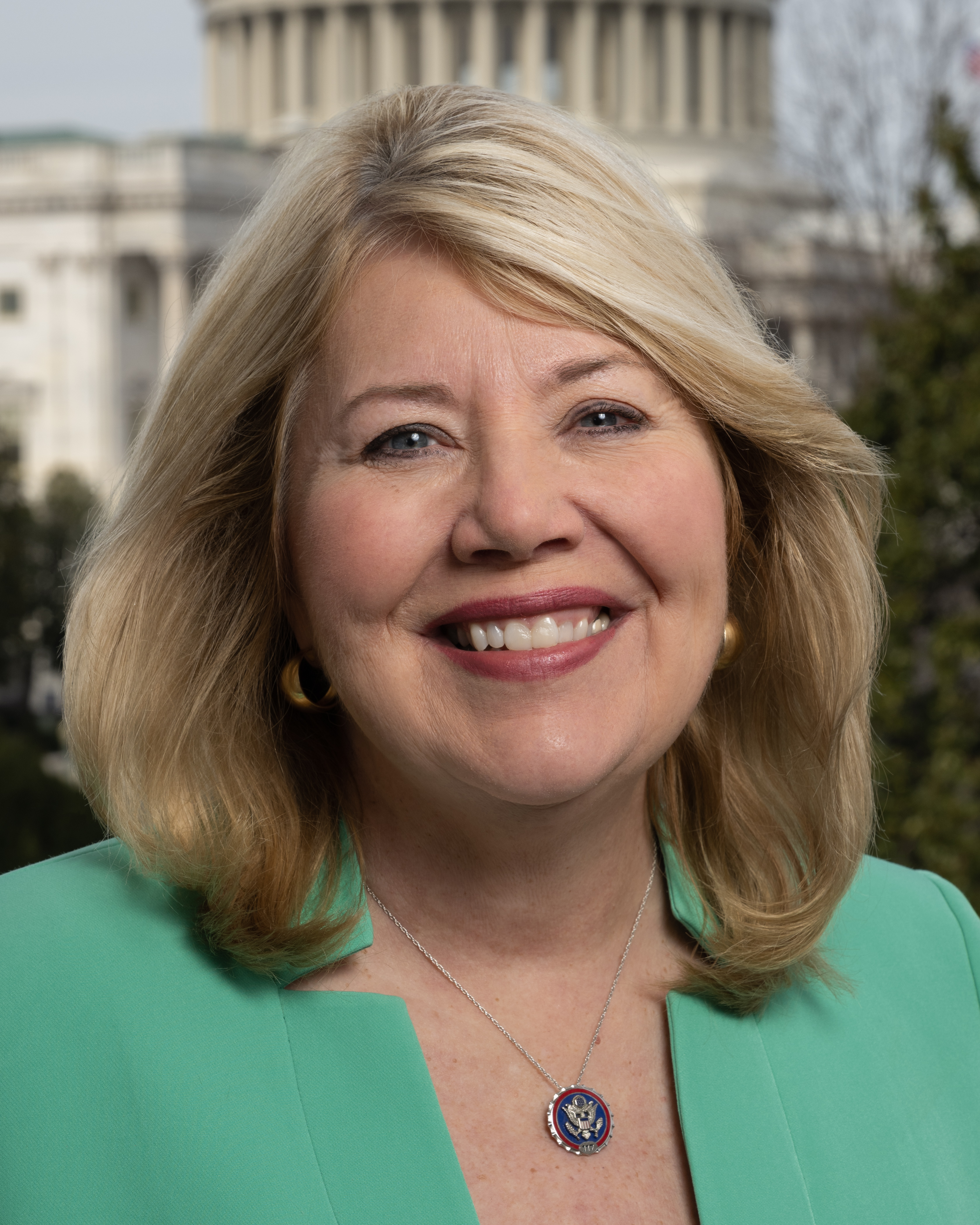

Nominee	Debbie Lesko	Jeremy Spreitzer (write-in)
Party	Republican	Democratic
Popular vote	197,555	5,145
Percentage	96.51%	0.98%
- Lesko: 70–80% 80–90% >90% No votes
U.S. Representative before election
Debbie Lesko
Republican
Elected U.S. Representative
Debbie Lesko
Republican

The incumbent was Republican Debbie Lesko, who was re-elected with 59.6% of the vote in 2020. The new 8th district is slightly northeast of its predecessor, covering the northwest Phoenix suburbs. Lesko ran for re-election unopposed.

=== Republican primary ===
==== Candidates ====
===== Nominee =====
- Debbie Lesko, incumbent U.S. representative

==== Endorsements ====
Debbie Lesko

Organizations

- Citizens for Responsible Energy Solutions
- Maggie's List

==== Results ====
Republican primary results
Party	Candidate	Votes	%
Republican	Debbie Lesko (incumbent)	100,629	100.0
Total votes		100,629	100.0

=== Democratic primary ===
==== Failed to qualify ====
- James Holmes

=== General election ===
==== Write-in candidates ====
- Alixandra Guzman
- Jeremy Spreitzer

==== Predictions ====
Source	Ranking	As of
The Cook Political Report	Solid R	October 25, 2022
Inside Elections	Solid R	October 21, 2022
Sabato's Crystal Ball	Safe R	October 26, 2022
Politico	Solid R	October 26, 2022
RCP	Safe R	October 26, 2022
Fox News	Solid R	October 25, 2022
DDHQ	Solid R	October 26, 2022
FiveThirtyEight	Solid R	October 26, 2022
The Economist	Safe R	October 16, 2022

==== Results ====
2022 Arizona's 8th congressional district election
Party	Candidate	Votes	%
Republican	Debbie Lesko (incumbent)	197,555	96.5
Democratic	Jeremy Spreitzer (write-in)	5,145	2.5
Democratic	Alixandria Guzman (write-in)	2,013	1.0
Total votes		204,713	100.0
Republican hold			

== District 9 ==
2022 Arizona's 9th congressional district election
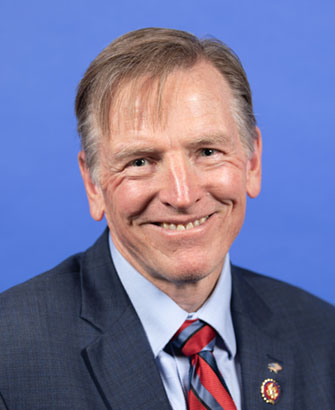

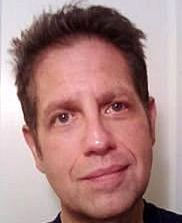
Nominee	Paul Gosar	Richard Grayson (write-in)
Party	Republican	Democratic
Popular vote	192,796	3,531
Percentage	97.77%	1.79%
- Gosar: 60–70% 70–80% 80–90% >90%
U.S. Representative before election
Paul Gosar
Republican
Elected U.S. Representative
Paul Gosar
Republican

The incumbent was Republican Paul Gosar, who was re-elected in Arizona's 4th congressional district with 69.7% of the vote in 2020. The new 9th district is still not competitive, but it is somewhat more so than the old 4th district; much of the old 4th district was drawn into the new 2nd district. Gosar won re-election unopposed.

=== Republican primary ===
==== Candidates ====
===== Nominee =====
- Paul Gosar, incumbent U.S. representative

===== Eliminated in primary =====
- Sandra Dowling, former Maricopa County School Superintendent and candidate for 8th district in 2018
- Randy Kutz, corporate trainer and realtor
- Adam Morgan, West Point graduate and former U.S. Army Ranger

===== Failed to qualify =====
- Brandon DeHart

==== Endorsements ====
Paul Gosar

U.S. executive branch officials

- Donald Trump, former president of the United States

==== Debate ====
2022 Arizona's 9th congressional district Republican primary debate
No.	Date	Host	Moderator	Link	Republican	Republican	Republican	Republican
Key: P Participant A Absent N Not invited I Invited W Withdrawn								
Key: P Participant A Absent N Not invited I Invited W Withdrawn					Sandra Dowling	Paul Gosar	Randy Kutz	Adam Morgan
1	Jun. 2, 2022	KAET; The Arizona Republic	Stacy Barchenger; Ted Simons		P	A	P	P

==== Results ====
Republican primary results
Party	Candidate	Votes	%
Republican	Paul Gosar (incumbent)	67,340	65.9
Republican	Randy Kutz	13,387	13.1
Republican	Adam Morgan	12,508	12.2
Republican	Sandra Dowling	8,851	8.7
Republican	Jack Harper (write-in)	76	0.1
Total votes		102,162	100.0

=== Democratic primary ===
==== Candidates ====
===== Eliminated in primary =====
- David Lucier (write-in)
- Gene Scharer (write-in)

===== Failed to qualify =====
- Matthew Daniel

==== Results ====
Democratic primary results
Party	Candidate	Votes	%
Democratic	David Lucier (write-in)	1,319	72.7
Democratic	Gene Scharer (write-in)	496	27.3
Total votes		1,815	100.0

=== General election ===
==== Write-in candidates ====
- Richard Grayson, writer, performance artist and perennial candidate
- Thomas Tzitzura

==== Predictions ====
Source	Ranking	As of
The Cook Political Report	Safe R	October 25, 2022
Inside Elections	Safe R	October 21, 2022
Sabato's Crystal Ball	Safe R	October 26, 2022
Politico	Safe R	October 26, 2022
RCP	Safe R	October 26, 2022
Fox News	Safe R	October 25, 2022
DDHQ	Safe R	October 26, 2022
FiveThirtyEight	Safe R	October 26, 2022
The Economist	Safe R	October 16, 2022

==== Results ====
2022 Arizona's 9th congressional district election
Party	Candidate	Votes	%
Republican	Paul Gosar (incumbent)	192,796	97.8
Democratic	Richard Grayson (write-in)	3,531	1.8
Democratic	Thomas Tzitzura (write-in)	858	0.4
Total votes		197,185	100.0
Republican hold			

== See also ==
- 2022 Arizona elections
- 2022 United States Senate election in Arizona

== Notes ==
Partisan clients
