= 1988 in LGBTQ rights =

This is a list of notable events in the history of LGBT rights that took place in the year 1988.

== Events ==
=== March ===
- 4 — In South Africa, the Immorality Amendment Act, 1988 imposes an age of consent of 19 for lesbian sex, which had previously been unregulated by the law. This was higher than the age of 16 applying to heterosexual sex.

=== April ===
- In Hungary, Lambda becomes the first LGBT organisation to be registered, also becoming the first such official recognition of an LGBT organization in Central and Eastern Europe.

=== May ===
- May 24 — In the United Kingdom, the Conservative government passes Section 28, a clause that bans the "promotion of homosexuality" by local government.

=== October ===
- 11 — In the United States, National Coming Out Day is founded.
- 15 — Alexandria, Virginia, bans discrimination in employment, housing and other practices based on sexual orientation.

=== November ===
- 8 — Voters in Oregon approve Measure 8, repealing Governor Neil Goldschmidt's 1987 executive order banning sexual orientation discrimination in state employment. The repeal does not go into effect as it is immediately challenged in court, and is ruled unconstitutional in 1992.

=== December ===
- 21 — The Chicago City Council votes 28–17 to ban discrimination based on sexual orientation.

== See also ==
- Timeline of LGBT history — timeline of events from 12,000 BCE to present
- LGBT rights by country or territory — current legal status around the world
- LGBT social movements
