= Equality Arizona =

Political advocacy organization

- The Equality Arizona logo

- U.S. State of Arizona
- Founded: 1992
- Location: Phoenix, Arizona
- Region served: Arizona
- Website: equalityarizona.org
- Formerly called: Arizona Human Rights Fund

Equality Arizona is a statewide political advocacy organization in Arizona that advocates for lesbian, gay, bisexual, and transgender (LGBTQ) rights, including same-sex marriage.

== History ==
Equality Arizona was formed in 1992 as the Arizona Human Rights Fund after the Phoenix City Council rejected a non-discrimination ordinance to extend protections to gays and lesbians.

== Structure ==
Equality Arizona is a 501(c)(3) nonprofit organization working on charitable, scientific, and educational efforts to promote LGBT issues.

Equality Arizona Advocacy Fund is a 501(c)(4) nonprofit organization that engages in lobbying on LGBT policy matters.

Equality Arizona Advocacy Fund PAC is a political action committee that endorses and support candidates for political office who support LGBT issues.

== Activities ==
Equality Arizona engages in political lobbying on LGBT issues, helping LGBT supportive candidates get elected into public office, educating the public on LGBT issues, and providing support to members of the LGBT community.

The organization is a member of the Equality Federation.

== See also ==
- LGBT rights in Arizona
- List of LGBT rights organizations
- Same-sex marriage in Arizona
