= Jerone Davison =

American football player (born 1970)

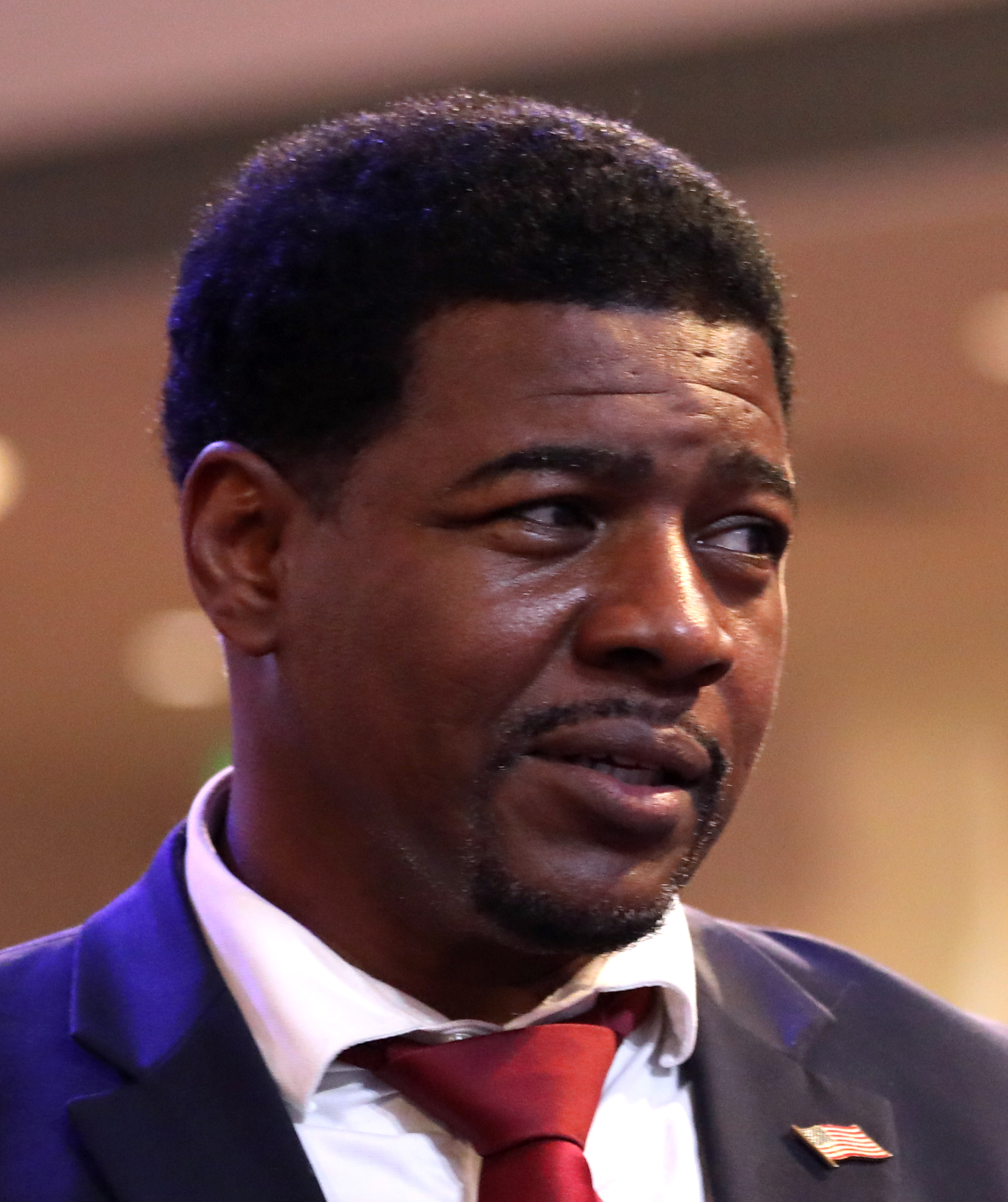
- Davison in 2024

No. 48
- Position: Running back

Personal information
- Born: September 16, 1970 (age 56); Picayune, Mississippi, U.S.
- Listed height: 6 ft 1 in (1.85 m)
- Listed weight: 235 lb (107 kg)

Career information
- High school: Memorial (Picayune)
- College: Solano CC (1989–1990); Arizona State (1991–1992)
- NFL draft: 1993: undrafted

Career history
- Los Angeles Rams (1993)*; San Francisco 49ers (1994)*; Sacramento Gold Miners (1994); San Francisco 49ers (1995)*; Rhein Fire (1996); Oakland Raiders (1996–1997)
- * Offseason or practice squad member only
- Stats at Pro Football Reference

Jerone Lamar Davison (born September 16, 1970) is an American former professional football player who was a running back for the Oakland Raiders of the National Football League (NFL) from 1996 to 1997. He played college football for the Arizona State Sun Devils. He played pro ball for the Sacramento Gold Miners of the Canadian Football League (CFL) in 1994. He ran in the Republican primary for the U.S. House in Arizona's 4th congressional district in 2022.

== Political career ==
Davison was a Republican candidate for U.S. Representative in the 2022 election, in Arizona's 4th congressional district. He lost the primary election on August 2, 2022 and came in last place in voting.

In July 2022, Davison released a 30-second advertisement in which he protects his home from "a dozen angry Democrats in Klan hoods" with an AR-15. The advertisement went viral, gathering more than 5 million views on Twitter.
