= 1992 in LGBTQ rights =

This is a list of notable events in the history of LGBT rights that took place in the year 1992.

== Events ==
- The World Health Organization declassifies homosexuality as a mental illness in the latest edition of its list of diseases and health problems, the ICD-10.
- U.S. state of California bans sexual orientation discrimination in the private sector.
- U.S. states of Vermont and New Jersey ban sexual orientation discrimination in the private sector.
- U.S. state of Oregon's Measure 8, approved in a referendum in 1988, is ruled unconstitutional by the Oregon Court of Appeals in the case known as Merrick v. Board of Higher Education, meaning that the 1987 executive order banning public-sector discrimination on the basis of sexual orientation stands.
- The City Council of Phoenix, Arizona, prohibits discrimination based on sexual orientation in the private sector.
- San Mateo County, California, bans employment discrimination based on sexual orientation in the private sector.

=== June ===
- The Lesbian Avengers, a direct action group, is founded in New York City by activists from the AIDS Coalition to Unleash Power (ACT UP).

=== September ===
- 24 — The Kentucky Supreme Court issues its holding in Kentucky v. Wasson, invalidating the state's sodomy law as unconstitutional.

=== October ===
- 27 — The Federal Court of Canada orders the Canadian military to stop discriminating against gays.

=== November ===
- 3
  - Denver, Aspen, and Boulder, Colorado pass ordinances to protect the rights of LGB people.
  - By a margin of 54 to 36%, voters in the U.S. state of Colorado approved Amendment 2, which prohibited bans on sexual orientation discrimination by cities in Colorado, such as the ones simultaneously enacted in Denver, Aspen, and Boulder. The amendment would never go into effect as it is soon challenged and struck down in Romer v. Evans, in which the Supreme Court of the United States ruled 6 to 3 that the Amendment did not satisfy the Equal Protection Clause of the United States Constitution.
  - Oregon Ballot Measure 9 is defeated in a referendum. The measure denounced homosexuality as "abnormal," "unnatural," and "perverse," would have prohibited sexual orientation discrimination bans in Oregon.
- Voters in Portland, Maine rejected a ballot measure to repeal a local gay rights ordinance by a vote of 57-43%.
- 5 — A clause prohibiting anti-gay verbal abuse in schools is repealed by the Fairfax County, Virginia board of education out of concerns that it promotes homosexuality.
- The Cincinnati City Council passed a city ordinance forbidding housing, employment, and public accommodations discrimination based on race, age, religion, "Appalachian origin," or sexual orientation.
