= Decision desk =

Experts projecting U.S. election winners

A decision desk is a team of experts that one or many US news organizations assemble to analyze incoming data about election results and project winners on election day. Decision desks use exit polling data as well as officially reported results as they come in, to project and then "call" the winners of elections on election night. "Projected winners" are only unofficial; depending on state or local laws, election officials may still have days or weeks after election day to complete counting votes and certifying winners.

== Organizations and methodology ==
In the United States, three major organizations aggregate election results across the country: the Associated Press, Decision Desk HQ, and the National Election Pool. Each organization uses different methodology - the Associated Press has a team of ground reporters that receive data from state county election boards, and also gets results from data feeds of election websites, while Decision Desk HQ uses a mix of traditional phone call and fax communication with election officials, as well as an application programming interface (API) that pulls election results as they come in from county and state election websites.

According to Vox, race calls from these organizations have an accuracy of over 99%. A handful of races have been called incorrectly, requiring corrections; these include a 2018 California's 21st congressional district election, which both the Associated Press and Decision Desk HQ called incorrectly. In that race, a larger-than-expected number of late-arriving mail-in ballots was responsible for the erroneous projections.

== History ==
=== United States ===
Exit polling data was gathered by Voter News Service which existed from 1990 to 2003, and which was disbanded due to disastrous mistakes in the 2000 presidential election and in the 2002 elections. Afterward they formed the National Election Pool, which produced skewed exit poll results in the 2004 US presidential election and in the 2016 presidential elections. Megyn Kelly was made famous when she walked backstage to Fox News's decision desk team during the broadcast of the 2012 US presidential election results, when Karl Rove contradicted the team's prediction that Obama would win.

Prior to 2011, most race calls were made by television networks or the Associated Press; the advent of social media enabled other organizations like Decision Desk HQ to begin to report election results as well. By 2026, the Associated Press, Decision Desk HQ, and the National Election Pool had established themselves as the major aggregators of election results.

=== Canada ===
In Canada, the CBC News decision desk declares the winner of Canadian federal elections.
